= Poilleux =

Poilleux is a French surname. Notable people with the surname include:

- Émile Poilleux (1866–1924), French violinist, violin teacher and writer
- Jacques Poilleux (1937 or 1938–2025), French doctor, surgeon, and academic
