= Albrecht Blumenstengel =

- Born: 7 January 1836; Helmstedt
- Died: 8 June 1895 (aged 59); Hamburg
- Citizenship: German
- Occupations: violinist, composer, editor, concertmaster
- Notable work: 24 Violin Etudes, Op.33

Albrecht Blumenstengel (1835–1895) was a German composer, violinist, arranger and editor.

== Biography ==
Albrecht Blumenstengel was born in Helmstedt on 7 January 1836.

Son of the German architect Johann Carl Heinrich Blumenstengel (1792–1867), he was the concertmaster of the ducal court.

He published several works and important violin books, today used in music conservatories, like Scale and Arpeggios Studies and the 24 Etudes op.33 (published for major publishing houses like Fischer, Schirmer, Litolff, Peters). The first edition of these Etudes was in 1855 and the style is romantic (some editor wrote improperly “Preparatory Studies to Kreutzer”).

He also wrote important pieces like 8 Transcritptionen, Op.13 for violin and piano (1872), Volkslieder-Album (2 books of 120 pieces for violin and piano – 1891).

He died in Hamburg on 8 June 1895.

== Compositions ==
- Scale and Arpeggio-Studies
- 24 Violin Etudes, Op.33
- 8 Transcriptionen, Op.13
- Volkslieder-Album
- Gavotte from Iphigénie en Aulide by C.W.Gluck

Albrecht Blumenstengel dealt mainly with pedagogical works and duets, including all of Spohr's violin duets and his Duo op. 13 for violin and viola.

== Discography ==
In 2023 the Italian violist Marco Misciagna recorded the world premiere of 24 Etudes Op.33 for violin, transcribed for viola by himself.
