= Dezso d'Antalffy =

Hungarian organist and composer

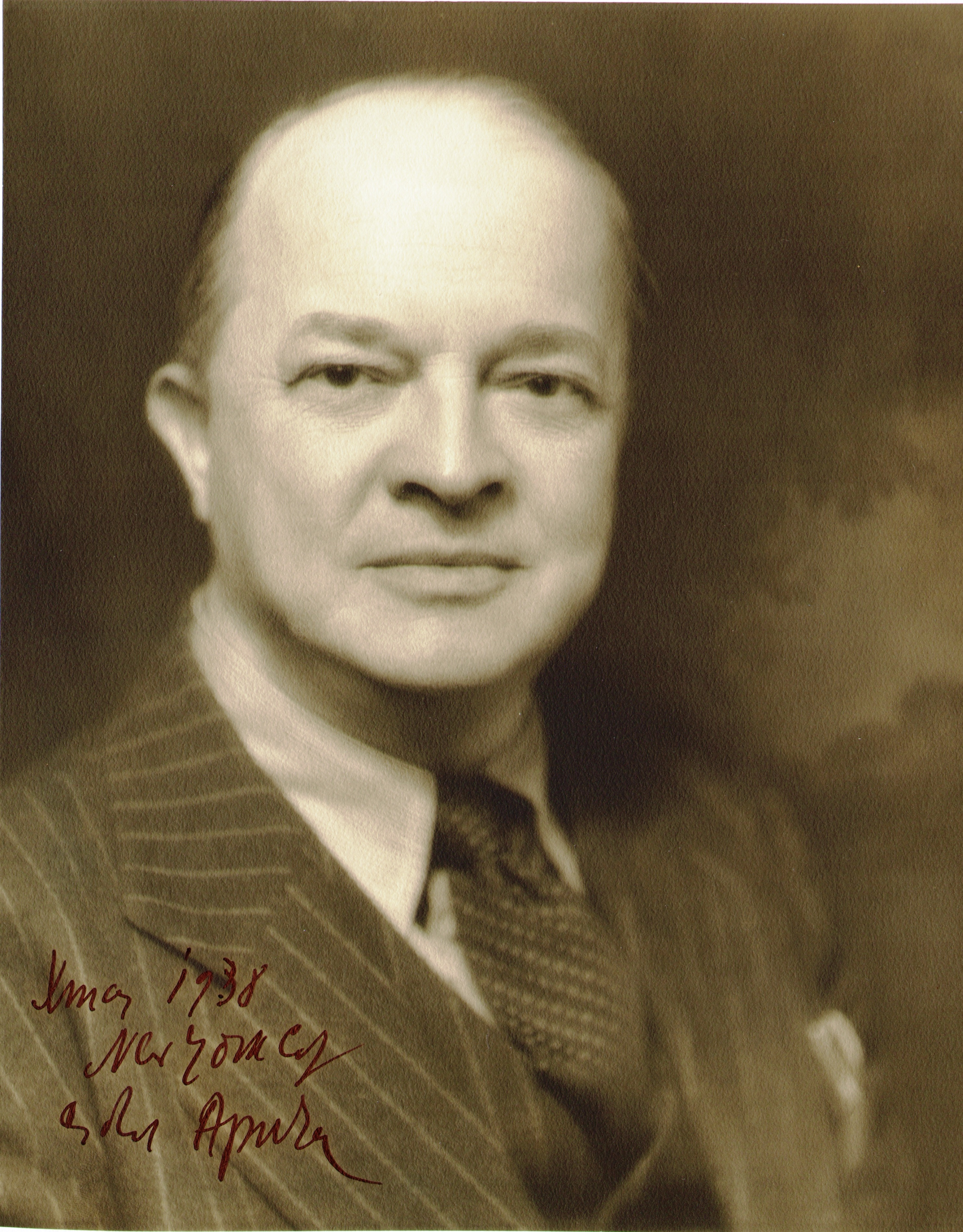

Background information
- Born: Dezső Antalffy-Zsiross; 25 July 1885; Nagybecskerek, Austria-Hungary
- Died: 29 April 1945 (aged 59) Denville, New Jersey, U.S.
- Occupations: Organist, composer
- Instrument: Organ

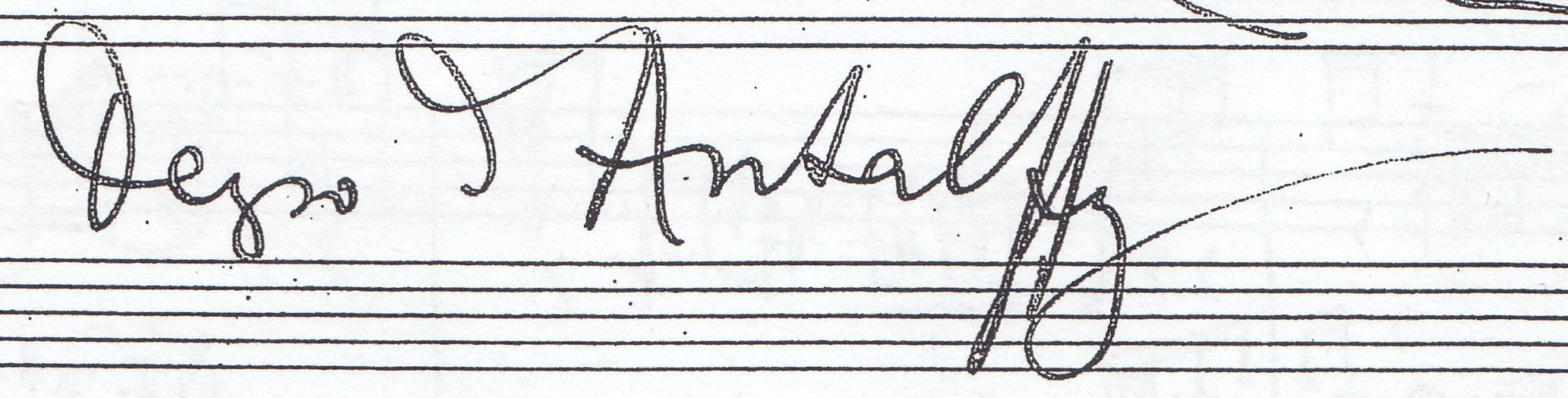
D'Antalffy's signature

Dezso d'Antalffy (born Dezső Antalffy-Zsiross; (Note: Names in Hungarian usually begin with the surname (Antalffy-Zsiross Dezső). To Germans, he was Desider von Antalffy, and Désiré d'Antalffy in France; in the United States he was known as Dezso d'Antalffy, as can be seen in the autograph of the cover of "Madrigal".) 24 July 1885 – 29 April 1945) was a Hungarian organist and composer. He was one of the most significant performing artists of his time. (Note: "This year's round of organ concerts was today enriched by the recital of Prof. D. D'Antalffy. This artist again confirmed his long recognised virtuosity by his performance of works by Bach, Schumann and others, in a well-rounded program, whose technical and interpretative excellence once more brought him the tumultuous plaudits of a crowded house." —Journal, March 20, 1920 "Prof. D'Antalffy, of the Royal Academy, today gave his third organ recital this season. The great artistry, technical finesse, and virtuosity of this young performer compelled the vigorous applause of his audience." —Pester Lloyd, March, 1919 "Before a packed hall, D'Antalffy gave his first organ concert of the season. The merit of his performance has long been recognized. He again proved his technical command and the sureness of his musical perception, expressed through the medium of romantic, neo-impressionistic style." —Journal, November, 1918 "At today's Philharmonic concert, the Hall of the Academy was so inadequate that the concert must be repeated on Sunday. It is easy to understand the large size of the audience who desired to attend when two such popular artists as Josef Lhevinne and D. D'Antalffy were the joint recitalists. Mr. D'Antalffy opened the program with consummate artistry giving admirable interpretation of Handel's Organ Concerto in A major." —Magyarország, March 27, 1917 Letters, Diary, Photo Album, Notes of Dezso d'Antalffy) He composed pieces for orchestra, chamber orchestra, choir, piano and organ which were published by Schirmer, Ricordi, Leduc, Salabert, Steingräber, Breitkopf and Universal.

== Early life ==
Dezso d'Antalffy was born into a musical family in Nagybecskerek, Banat, Kingdom of Hungary, Austria-Hungary, (present-day Zrenjanin, Serbia). His mother, a pianist, recognized his musical talent when he was four. At the age of seven, d'Antalffy's piano instruction was taken over by Ferenc Ripka. When he turned ten, Herr Ödön supervised his musical progress. As a secondary-school student he practiced eight hours a day, which gave him a firm basis for his technique.

== Academy of Music ==
=== Study ===
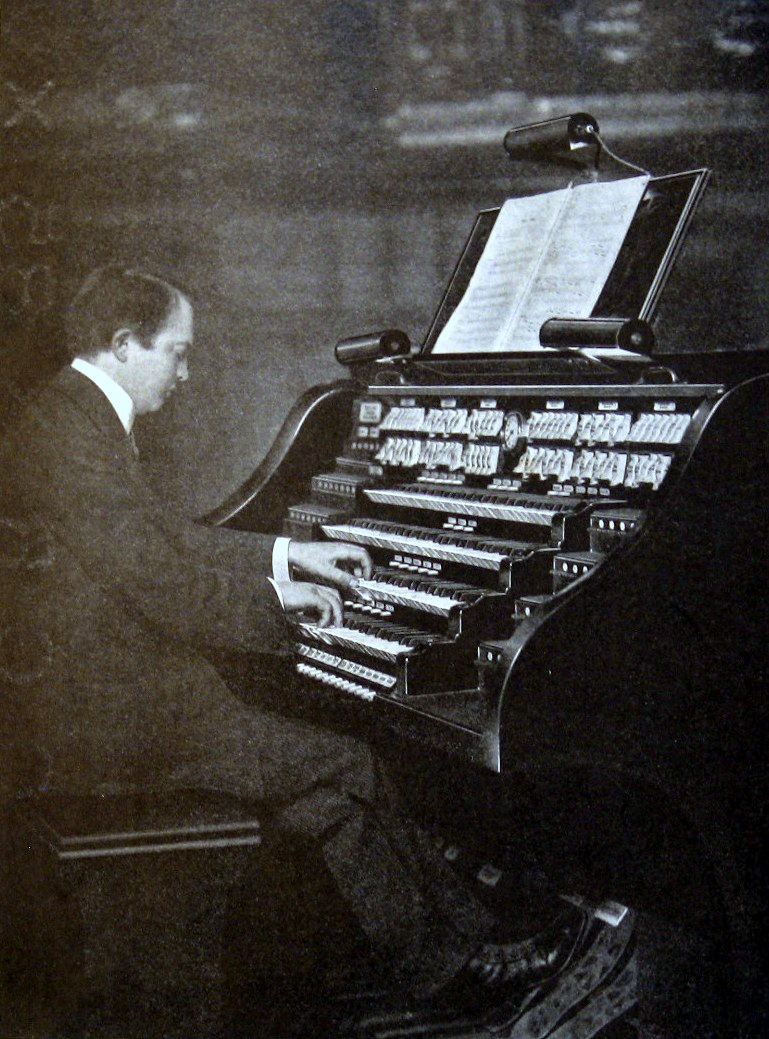
At the IV/74 Durlach organ at the Budapest Academy of Music in 1907

D'Antallfy moved to Budapest in 1902, where he attended the faculty of law at the Hungarian Royal University according to his father's wishes, and studied the organ and composed music at the Franz Liszt Academy of Music. For four years he was the student of Hans Koessler, who taught many Hungarian composers including Kodály, Bartók and Weiner. D'Antallfy graduated in 1906.

He studied composition at the Academy of Music in Berlin, a musical centre at the time, and had classes with Hungarian violinist and composer Joseph Joachim. D'Antallfy was a conductor at the Cologne Opera House in 1907 and 1908. In 1909, he continued his studies in Leipzig and Bologna.

=== Teaching ===
A decade in Budapest began with his return in 1909, when d’Antalffy composed most of his organ pieces. When his teacher retired in 1909, he became an organ teacher at the Academy of Music and received tenure in 1912. In 1919, d’Antalffy began teaching composition. His first solo concert in January 1911 was a success, and he received a wreath from his fellow musicians. The concert featured a wide range of music, from the early Baroque (Frescobaldi) to contemporary music (including his own pieces). He married Dalma Arkay in March 1911 and fathered his only daughter, Judith d'Antalffy, in 1912.

Until the outbreak of World War I in 1914, d’Antalffy continued composing. He began performing abroad, and his expertise in organ-building was recognized. He was recruited when war broke out, and remained in Großwardein (or Nagyvárad) for two years. In 1916 d’Antalffy began working again, giving charity performances in Budapest, Transylvania and elsewhere in the country. At the height of his career in 1917, he was the chief organist at St. Stephan's Basilica in Budapest (playing the largest organ in the country, built by József Angster (Note: He served as chief organist and choirmaster of the St. Stephen's Cathedral, playing their IV/64 Angster organ (1905).) in 1905.

== Study abroad ==
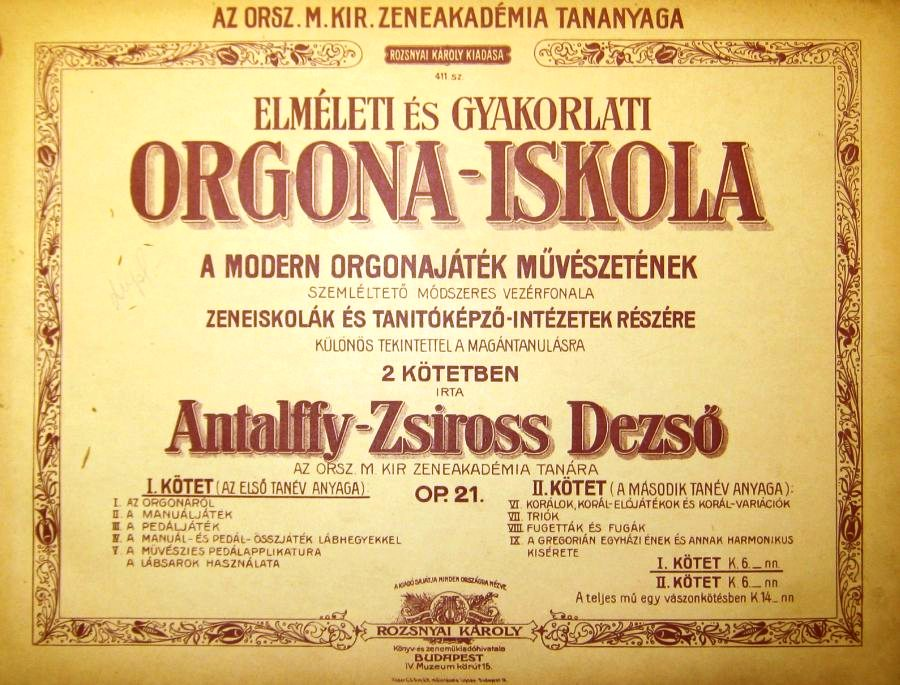
Page from d'Antalffy's 1911 Organ Tutor

In Leipzig, he studied composition with organist Max Reger. His organ teacher was Karl Straube, virtuoso organist of St. Thomas Church. Leipzig was an organ hotbed at the time, and its effects can be heard in d'Antalffy's works. Reger's combination of the tradition of Bach with Liszt and Brahms was part of his mindset when he seasoned traditional themes and melodies with impressionist, Debussy-like harmonies. Enrico Bossi, his teacher of interpretation and methodology in Bologna, had a similar influence since Bossi's works centred around the organ. Although Reger used liturgical genres such as the chorale and fugue, Bossi primarily composed concert pieces and D'Antalffy did the latter as well. Bossi's impact on d'Antalffy as a teacher became tangible in 1911, when he wrote his two-volume Organ Tutor (a detailed, versatile course book in Hungarian, focusing on the pupil's technical development with a variety of exercises).

== Success in the United States ==
D'Antalffy arrived in New York on January 4, 1921, and appeared onstage as an accompanist on January 21. After the success of a concert with Duci Kerékjártó (Note: "If Paganini and Sarasate could be rolled into one, the combination would probably be such a demon of the violin as Duci de Kerekjarto" - N. Y. Mail, January 3. 1921) on the violin, they set off on a several-month tour. D'Antalffy and Kerékjártó traveled across the country—"half the continent", as he described it in a letter. In April Schirmer was ready to produce six of his pieces, which were published the following spring. Invited by entrepreneur Samuel Roxy Rothafel, (Note: S. L. "Roxy" Rothafel hired d'Antalffy in 1927 as one of three organists (with Lew White and Casimir A. J. Parmentier) for the opening of the Roxy Theatre in New York. The Roxy had a V/34 Kimball with two other consoles, Op. 6889, and in the lobby, a III/14 Kimball, Op. 6888 (1927).) d'Antalffy became the organist of the two-year-old Capitol Theatre, (Note: He also worked as organist at the Capitol Theatre, New York City, playing a IV/45 Estey, Op. 1710 (1919)) (where he played a concert the following April establishing him as the "Dohnányi of the organ" in the press). The 4,000-seat Capitol Theatre, was a forerunner of the later cinema palaces.

In September 1922, d'Antalffy became an organ teacher (Note: d'Antalffy was invited by Georg Eastman to teach organ specifically "motion picture accompaniment" at the Eastman Music School in Rochester; he taught during 1922 and 1923. John Hammond (who recorded under the name of John Hassell) was hired during the same time for the same purpose. They both performed in nightly programs providing organ accompaniment at the Eastman Theatre playing the IV/135 Austin, Op.1010 (1923).) at the Eastman School of Music of the University of Rochester and, with John Hammond, an organist at the 3,000-seat Eastman Theatre.

In February 1924, d'Antalffy was asked to be the musical director of a series of performances. American producer Morris Gest brought The Miracle, a 1911 play by Kurt Vollmöller and directed by Max Reinhard in Germany, to the U.S. D'Antalffy was the organist, the choirmaster and the conductor of the three-act play. He met his daughter and returned to Budapest, where he accepted a teaching position at the Academy of Music after a three-and-a-half-year absence.

== Budapest and the U.S. ==
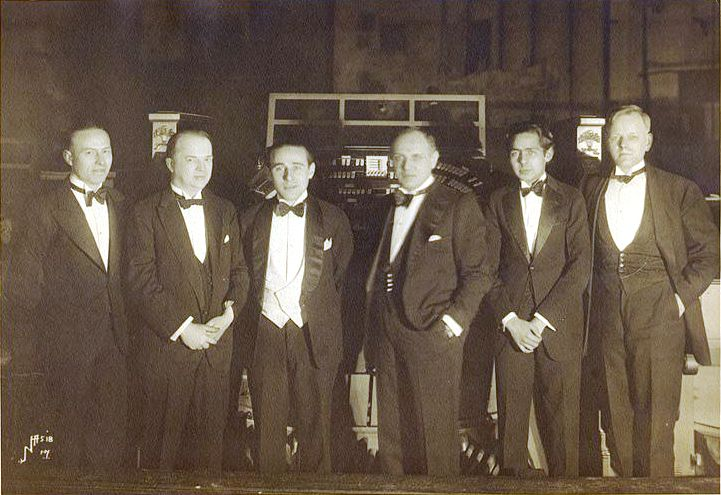
Samuel Roxy Rothafel with his organ staff in front of the Kimball console at the March 11, 1927 opening of the Roxy Theatre in New York (left to right: C. A. J. Parmentier, Dezso d'Antalffy, Lew White, "Roxy" Rothafel, Emil Velazco and Franck White)

Circumstances in Budapest were difficult. The organ of the Academy of Music was under reconstruction and temporarily unusable, making teaching and concerts impossible. D'Antalffy gave concerts in other towns, toured the United States in December 1924 to perform The Miracle and accepted lesser positions as a conductor and organist.

In 1925, d'Antalffy returned to teaching and giving concerts at the academy for a year. For the third time, he then joined The Miracle company for a series of 32 performances in Los Angeles in January and February 1927. Producer Morris Gest asked d'Antalffy to compose music for Hofmannstahl's play, Everyman. His stay in the U.S. was lengthened by an invitation to teach from Union Theological Seminary in New York, and shortly afterwards his Academy of Music contract expired. D'Antalffy taught freshmen composition, counterpoint, music-reading, transposition and orchestration from 1927 to 1929 at the seminary's new sacred-music school, which existed until 1973.

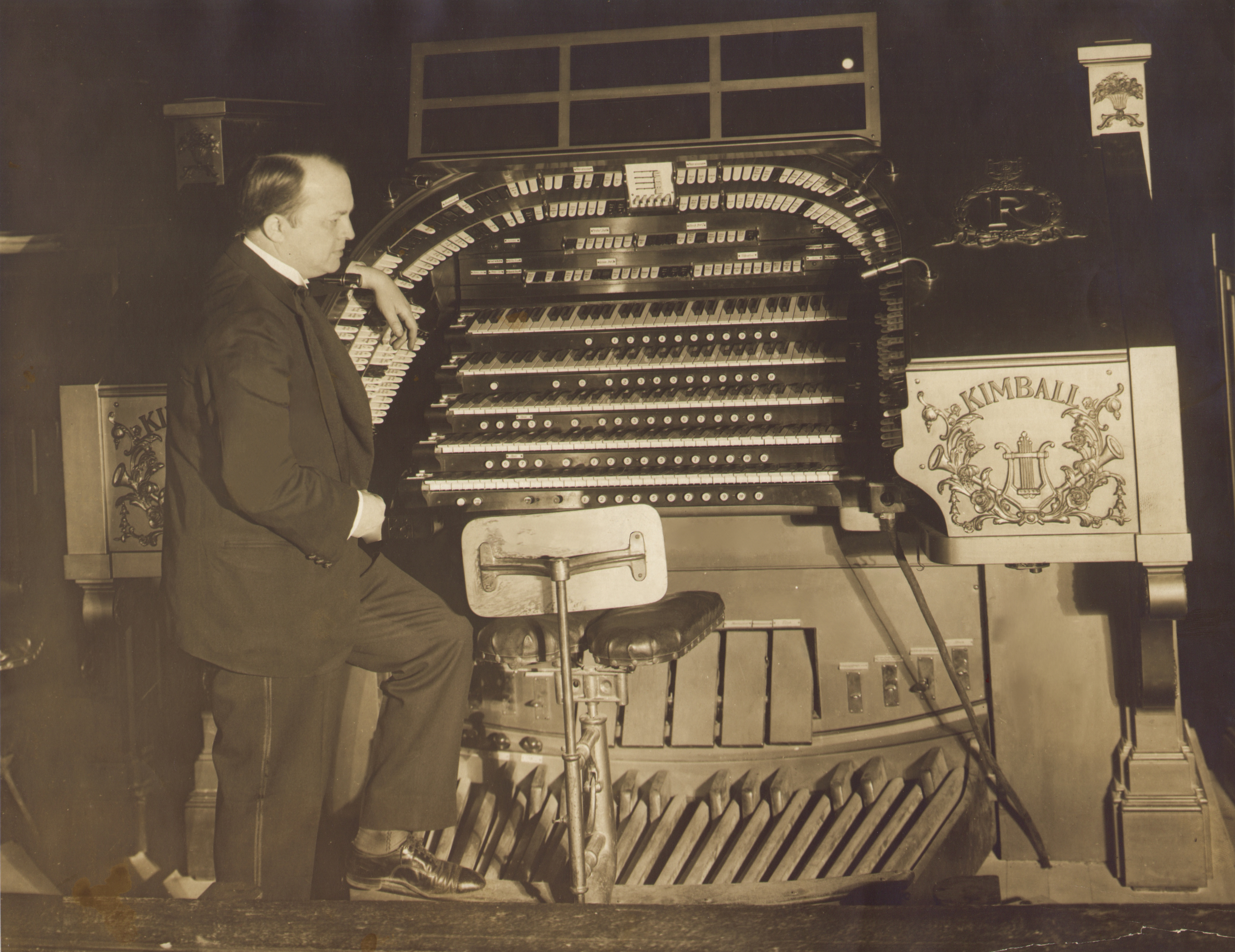
D'Antalffy at the Roxy Theatre organ in New York

The Miracle company offered him work again at the beginning of 1929; Morris Gest was looking for a composer and conductor for a new production, The Freiburg Passion Play, directed by David Belasco (Gest's father-in-law, who had staged John Luther Long's short story "Madame Butterfly"). The play's 1900 London production influenced Giacomo Puccini, who did not understand English, to compose an operatic version. From April to June 1929 The Freiburg Passion Play was presented in the largest theatre of the time, the 5,300-seat Hippodrome Theatre in New York.

In 1927, impresario Samuel Roxy Rothafel invited d'Antalffy to join the staff of organists at his new Roxy Theatre in New York City; at the time, the Roxy was the country's most prestigious movie palace. After the onset of the Great Depression, d'Antalffy toured in Europe during the spring of 1930. He became involved in the film industry, recording the soundtrack music for Gaumont's The Miracle of the Wolves. D'Antalffy returned to Hungary, giving concerts in and outside Budapest, and was one of the first to play the newly built Angster organ in Szeged's Votive Church. It was the second-largest organ in Europe at the time, with five manuals and 136 stops.

At the end of 1931, d'Antalffy returned to the U.S. and Rothafel commissioned him to compose an oratorio for the December 27, 1932 opening of Radio City Music Hall. Radio City was part of Rockefeller Center, at the time the world's largest privately owned enterprise which included fourteen Art Deco skyscraper office buildings, and was designed as the world's largest, most-luxurious theatre. The lyrics and orchestration of his oratorio, The Voice of Millions, (Note: "Voices of Millions premiered in Radio City Music Hall with a 100-piece orchestra and a choir of 300 voices presenting it over a world-wide radio hook-up. Mr. d'Antalffy has gone on composing for Music Hall productions ever since and as a member of their staff, pinch hits for Dick Leibert several times a week on the 'world's largest' organ installed there".) were imbued with the idea of equal rights; his choir consisted of black and white singers, and his lyrics contained sacred texts from four world religions. The first worldwide broadcast by Radio City was a success, and d'Antalffy worked for the theatre as a staff composer and organist (Note: In 1932, d'Antalffy became staff composer and organist for the Radio City Music Hall playing the IV/58 Wurlitzer, Op.2179 (1932). From 1932 to 1939, he was full time and from 1939 to 1942, part time.) for ten years.

== Native American opera and later life ==
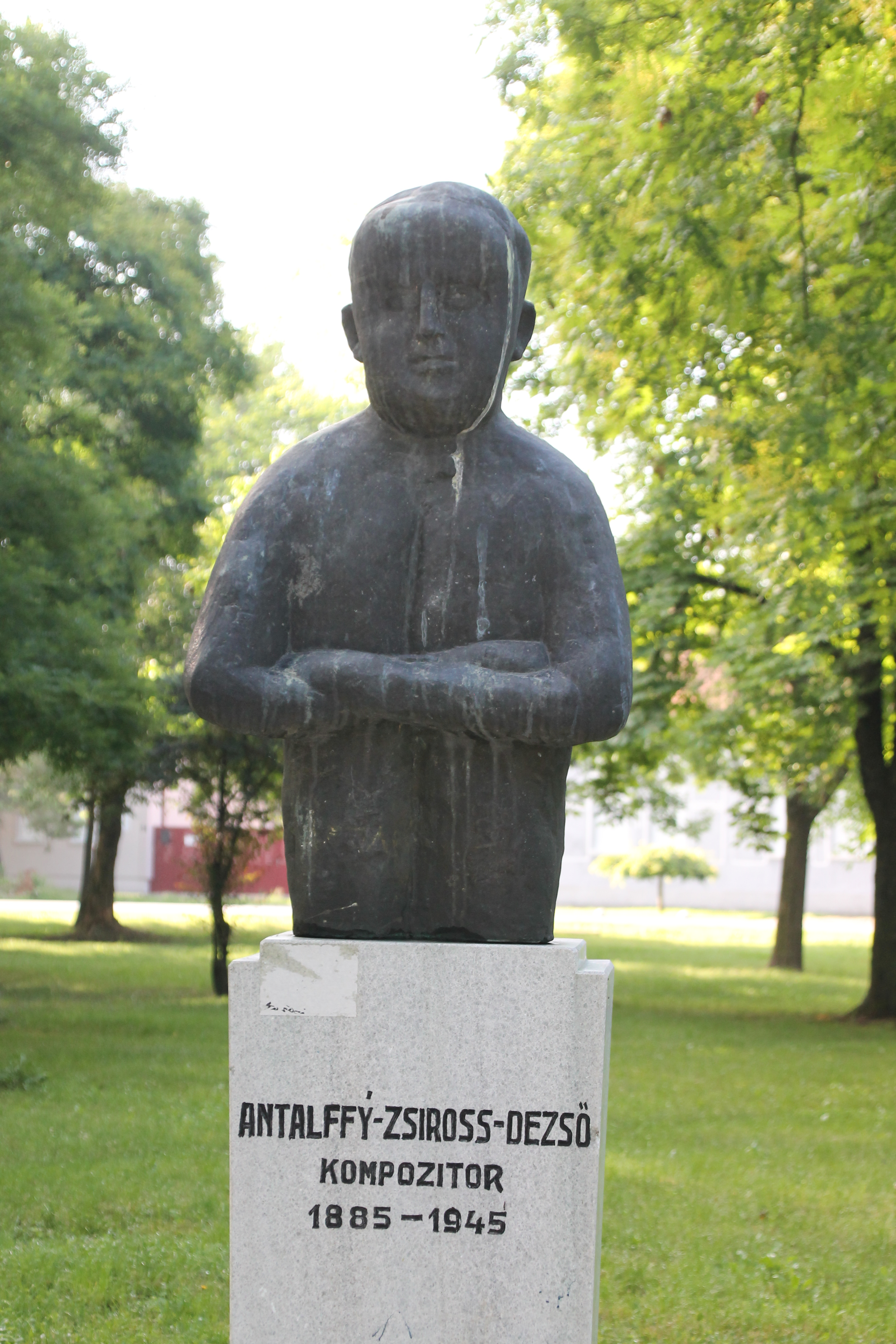
Bust in his hometown Zrenjanin

At the peak of his career (contemporaneous with Kodály, Bartók and Stravinsky, d’Antalffy composed a Native American opera. Onteora's Bride, a version of an Indian story, was presented at Radio City Music Hall in 1934. In its two-week run, it was played four or five times a day for a total of 58 performances. The Indian Association of America made d’Antalffy an honorary chieftain.

In 1936 he orchestrated Bach's Concerto for Two Violins for the New York Philharmonic, and the orchestra (directed by John Barbirolli) made d’Antalffy an honorary member in 1938. The piece, his final success as a composer, was performed in 1940.

Hospitalized with heart failure in 1942, d'Antalffy was unable to follow his wife back to Budapest. Although he considered returning to Hungary, he was prevented from doing so by health and financial problems. D’Antalffy died in a Denville, New Jersey nursing home on April 29, 1945, at age 59.

== Works ==
=== Organ works ===
- Three Easy Chorale Preludes, op. 22 (Jesus, my Joy; I shall not Leave my Jesus; Ah Holy Jesus)
- Three Chants, op. 10 No. 1-3 (Chant solennel, Chant de cygne, Serenade)
- Choral Fantasy and Fugue on "Herzlich tut mich verlangen"
- Legende in F
- Fugues in F and A minor
- Intermezzo in G minor
- Minnesang (Note: dedicated to Mr. Eugen Boross)
- Four Pieces: Madrigal, (Note: To Mr. Melchiorre Mauro-Cottone) Sportive Fauns, (Note: after Böcklin's painting. This piece was dedicated to his friend, Marcel Dupré.) Drifting Clouds, (Note: This relaxing piece was dedicated to d'Antalffy's friend, Pietro Yon, who had become a US citizen in the previous year.) Christmas Chimes (Note: This piece was dedicated to the Wanamaker organist for Philadelphia and New York, Alexander Russell.)
- Festa Bucolica (toccata; Rural Merrymaking)
- Madonna (Note: dedicated to Lady Duveen) – (a piece of stained glass)
- Sketches on Negro Spirituals
- Solitude
- Prayer for the Children
- Prayer for the Deceased
- O World, I Must Leave You (chorale variations)
- Scène pastorale
- Mourning Song
- Evening Song
- Night Song
- Island of the Dead
- Serenade from the Hungarian Suite
- Improvisations for the Miracle des Loups
- Reveille de Printemps (lost)

=== Piano works ===
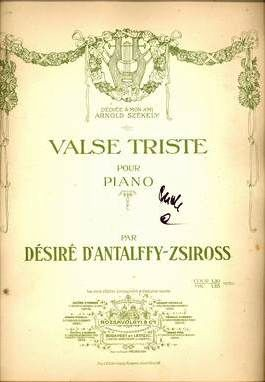
Cover of Valse triste score for piano

- Bagatellen
- Polonaise characteristique
- Tarantella
- Am Meer: Drei Stimmungsbilder für Pianoforte
- Carneval-Szenen: 4 Humoreske Rhapsodie
- Reading (Rococo, Marche Grotesque, Valse Sentimentale)
- Drei lyrische Stücke
- Valse triste
- Valse intime
- Valse (scéne de ballett)
- Trois Pièces
- Weinachtslied
- Serenade from the Hungarian Suite for Piano
- Biedermeier (Alt-Wien)
- Rococo
- Works for piano (Morning-shower for the fingers, Pour une dame hongroise, Deux gamins au soir)
- Fairy Dance
- Ballade
- Serenade
- Mors equitus (preludes sentiments)
- Prelude (Sír a kis galambom ...)
- D.A. to E.B. - Andante appassionato (E. Bossinak ajánlva)
- Hungarian Ouverture (for four hands)
- Hungarian Suite (for four hands)

=== Chamber music ===
- Hungarian Fantasia (for tárogató and piano or cimbalom)
- Czimbalom (for tárogató ensemble)
- Hungarian Lamentation and Rural Dances (for clarinet, trumpet, violin and cimbalom or piano)
- Piano Quintet (for strings and piano)
- Serenade from the Hungarian Suite (for string quartet)
- A Tough Nut to Crack (symphonic poem for two violins, viola and cello)
- Dixie Variations (for twelve pianos)

=== Chamber music for violin and piano ===
- Romance
- Love Song
- Melancholy Lullaby
- Mosquitoes Concert Caprice
- Duo, Fantasie Stück
- Pastorale (for violin and organ or piano)
- Caprice chinoise
- Caprice No. 2
- Mirror-canon (for two violins)

=== Voice and piano ===
- Songs After Poems by Petőfi
- Songs After Poems by Ady
- Five Hungarian Songs
- Two Hungarian Sketches (Snowflakes, The Little Bride)
- The Prayer of Szekler
- Songs by Liliencron and Carmen Sylva
- Songs After Poems by Rilke
- Get Off, Raven (from "Wild Roses" by Kriza)
- Come To Me For Dinner (from "Wild Roses")
- Child Prodigy (after a poem by Gyula Juhász)
- On the Waters of the Danube (Slavic ballad, after a poem by János Arany)
- Szekely Folk Ballads (Angoli Borbala)
- Burmese Love Song (lyrics by Arthur Guiterman)

=== Choir ===
- Lily of the Valley (madrigal for eight-part mixed choir, with solos for soprano and tenor)
- Hungarian Rhapsody (for eight-part mixed choir)
- Mass in E major
- Sanctus in A-flat major (for six-part mixed choir)
- Agnus Dei (for six-part mixed choir)
- Two Hungarian Songs for Christian Worship (for four-part mixed choir, with organ or piano accompaniment)

=== Instruction ===
- Organ Tutor (two volumes, op. 21)
- Method for Transposition
- Guide to Reading Choral Music (textbook)
- Art of Registration

=== Orchestra and choir ===
- Voice of Millions
- Variations for 12 Claviers and Orchestra
- Christmas Cantata
- Easter Oratorio (for mixed choir and orchestra)
- American Festival Prologue (for organ and orchestra)
- Ballad of Simon Judith (for alto voice and orchestra)
- Two Hungarian Folk Songs (for tenor voice and orchestra)
- Hungarian Suite
- Lyric Suite (for small orchestra)
- Hungarian Overture (for József Katona's play, Bánk bán)
- Divertimento
- Suite in B minor
- Lyric Cantata (after Jeno Farkas' poem "Orange Blossoms", for small orchestra, tenor voice and women's choir)
- Cantata After a Poem by Walt Whitman (for little orchestra, soprano and baritone)
- Serenade from the Hungarian Suite (for orchestra)
- Storm (for military band)
- From Depths of Wae (chorale after Johann Sebastian Bach, for mixed choir and orchestra)
- O Sacred Head (chorale after Bach, for orchestra)
- Christmas Vision (for solo voices, mixed choir, organ and orchestra)
- Dedication After a Poem by Martha Wilchinski (for solo voice and orchestra)
- Introduction and Lamentation (for choir and orchestra)
- Go down death ... (melodrama for solo voice and orchestra, after Negro melodies)

=== Plays ===
- Onteora's Bride
- Carnival (Opera-Comique in one act)
- Lady in White (ballet)
- Carnival Adventure
- The Little Match Girl (Christmas pantomime)
- Angkor Wat - A Night in the Hidden Cities (pantomime ballet in four acts)
- Fairy De Paris (operetta in three acts)

=== Accompanying music ===
- Piano accompaniment for Emod Tamas' one-act play, Lotharingia
- Everyman by Hugo von Hofmannsthal
- Accompanying music to Ashley Duke's play, The Patriot, produced by Gilbert Miller and based on Alfred Neumann's German novel, Der Patriot
- Freiburg Passion Players (New York)
- Le Miracle des Loups (soundtrack)

=== Orchestrations ===
- Bach's Concerto in D minor, BWV 596 (for full orchestra)
- Bach's Prelude and Fugue in E minor, BWV 548 (for full orchestra)
- Marche Héroique Overture by Camille Saint-Saëns (for organ and orchestra)

== Sources ==
- Magyar életrajzi lexikon I. (A–K). Főszerk. Kenyeres Ágnes. Budapest: Akadémiai. 1967. 41. p.
- Révai Új Lexikona. I. köt. Főszerk. Kollega Tarsoly István. Szekszárd, 1996. Babits K. 519–520. l. ISBN 9639015180
- Kotta.info - Antalffy - Zsiross : Apróságok
- Válogatott Orgonaművek, Editio Musica Budapest (Koloss István összeállítása)
- Selected Organ Works
- Antalffy - Zsiross Dezső - Művészetek Palotája
- Curriculum vitae of Dezso d'Antalffy
- Judith d'Antalffy's biography about her father
- Letters, Diary, Photo Album, Notes of Dezso d'Antalffy
- Rochester History - A History of the Eastman Theatre by Vincent Lenti
- Almanac of The Eastman School of Music évkönyv
- Angster József: Angster, die Geschichte der Pécser Orgelfabrik und der Familie, Pécsi Könyvek 1993
- Képes Családi Lapok June 11, 1905.
- Pesti Napló, "Az Újság" March 1907.
- Magyarország, May 16, 1907.
- Zeneközlöny, March 2, 1908.
- Budapesti Hírlap, March 5, 1908.
- Magyar Nemzet, "Magyarország", Pesti Napló, Zenelap January 18, 1909
- "A Hét" Budapest, February 6, 1906.
- "Világ", "Egyetértés", Pesti Napló January 9, 1911.
- "Érdekes Újság" 1914, Húsvéti szám
- "Magyarország", "Az Újság" February 20, 1916.
- Újvidéki Hírlap, January 16, 1917
- "Budapest",Pesti Hírlap, Pesti Napló,Az Újság March 27, 1917
- Arad és Vidéke, Aradi Közlöny June 5, 1917
- Magyarország,"Az Újság",Pesti Hírlap, November 17, 1917.
- Pesti Hírlap, Pesti Napló, Az Újság February 15, 1918
- Pesti Hírlap, Pesti Napló,Az Újság, "Világ", "Alkotmány", "Magyarország" 1918. December 19.
- Budapesti Hírlap, Pesti Napló March 18, 1919.
- Pesti Hírlap, "Világ" April 7, 1919.
- "Az Újság","Magyarország", "Világ", "Szózat","Új Nemzedék", "Nemzeti Újság" October 16, 1919.
- "Új Nemzedék", "Világ", Az Újság 1919. November 25.
- "Világ", "Szózat", "Az Újság", Budapesti Hírlap 1919. December 16.
- "Világ", "Szózat", "Új Nemzedék", Budapesti Hírlap February 16, 1920.
- "Világ", "Szózat","Új Nemzedék",Az Újság March 22, 1920
- Színházi Újság, September 15, 1920.
- Amerikai Magyar Népszava January 14, 1921.
- The Cleveland News February 2, 1921.
- Cleveland Topics February 26, 1921.
- Cleveland- "Szabadság" February 23, 1921.
- Detroit Journal April 15, 1921
- The Detroit News April 16, 1921
- Színházi Újság September 15, 1921.
- Amerikai Népszava September 20, 1921.
- "The Pittsburgh Dispatch" 20.9.1921.
- The Pittsburgh Gazette Times 21.9.1921.
- Cleveland- "Szabadság" September 1921
- The South Bend Tribune 9.1.1922.
- "Songstown" 16.1.1922.
- Amerikai Magyar Népszava April 13, 1922.
- Amerikai Magyar Népszava April 21, 1922.
- "Előre" April 23, 1922.
- The Brooklyn Standard Union: Sunday, April 1922
- The Morning Telegraph, Sunday, April 30, 1922.
- Amerikai Magyar Népszava May 1, 1922.
- The Sun 1.5.1922.
- Musical Courier 4.5.1922.
- Musical America 6.5.1922.
- Amerikai Magyar Újság May 2, 1922
- Bridgeport June 7, 1922.
- Cleveland- "Szabadság", Bridgeport June 10, 1922.
- The Lorain Evening Journal, June 14, 1922.
- Cleveland- "Szabadság", June 15, 1922
- Cleveland- "Szabadság", March 1, 1935
- The Lorain Evening Journal, June 16, 1922.
- Cleveland- "Szabadság", June 19, 1922.
- Amerikai Magyar Népszava, August 1922
- Rochester Democrat and Chronicle January 6, 1923.
- Amerikai Magyar Népszava, June 14, 1925.
- Musical Courier 24.11.1934.
- Cleveland- "Szabadság", New Yorki levél March 1, 1935.
- Promgram MagazineAeolian Hall, New York
- Zeneközlöny 1908 - Antalffy Magyar Suite
- Nemzeti Zenede 1910. januári műsorfüzet
- Új Ember October 20, 1985.
- ArticlesThe New York Times
- Promgram Magazine Radio City Music Hall
- Own research of Denes Kapitany
- A short biography of d'Antalffy by Denes Kapitany and Michael Johnston, 2011
- Gabor Kocsis: notes to Denes Kapitany's recording (Clouds and Chimes - The Wonderer of two Worlds - Dezso d'Antalffy's Organ Works)2012/ORG
