= Schirmer =

Schirmer is a German surname. Notable people with the surname include:

- Adolf Schirmer (1850–1930), Norwegian architect
- Alice G. Schirmer (1875–1935), American nurse and cookbook writer
- Astrid Schirmer (born 1941), German operatic soprano
- August Schirmer (1905–1948), German Nazi propagandist
- Cezar Schirmer (born 1952), Brazilian politician
- David Schirmer (1623–1686), German poet
- Johann Wilhelm Schirmer (1807–1863), German painter
- Friedrich Wilhelm Schirmer (1802–1866), German painter
- Gerhart Schirmer (1913–2004), German officer
- Heinrich Ernst Schirmer (1814–1887), Norwegian-German architect
- Herman Major Schirmer (1845–1913), Norwegian architect and art historian
- Marcel Schirmer (born 1966), German thrash metal musician
- Markus Schirmer (born 1963), Austrian pianist
- Maximilian Schirmer (born 1990), German politician
- Øistein Schirmer (1879–1947), Norwegian gymnast
- Otto Schirmer (1864–1918), German ophthalmologist
- Rudolf Schirmer (1831–1896), German ophthalmologist
- Ulf Schirmer (born 1959), German conductor
- Wilhelmine Schirmer-Pröscher (1889–1992), East German politician

== See also ==
- Schirmer's test, eye test assessing tear/moisture production
- Schirmer & Son, German piano brand
- G. Schirmer, American classical music publishing company
