= List of compositions by Marco Anzoletti =

The following is a list of compositions by Marco Anzoletti (1867–1929).

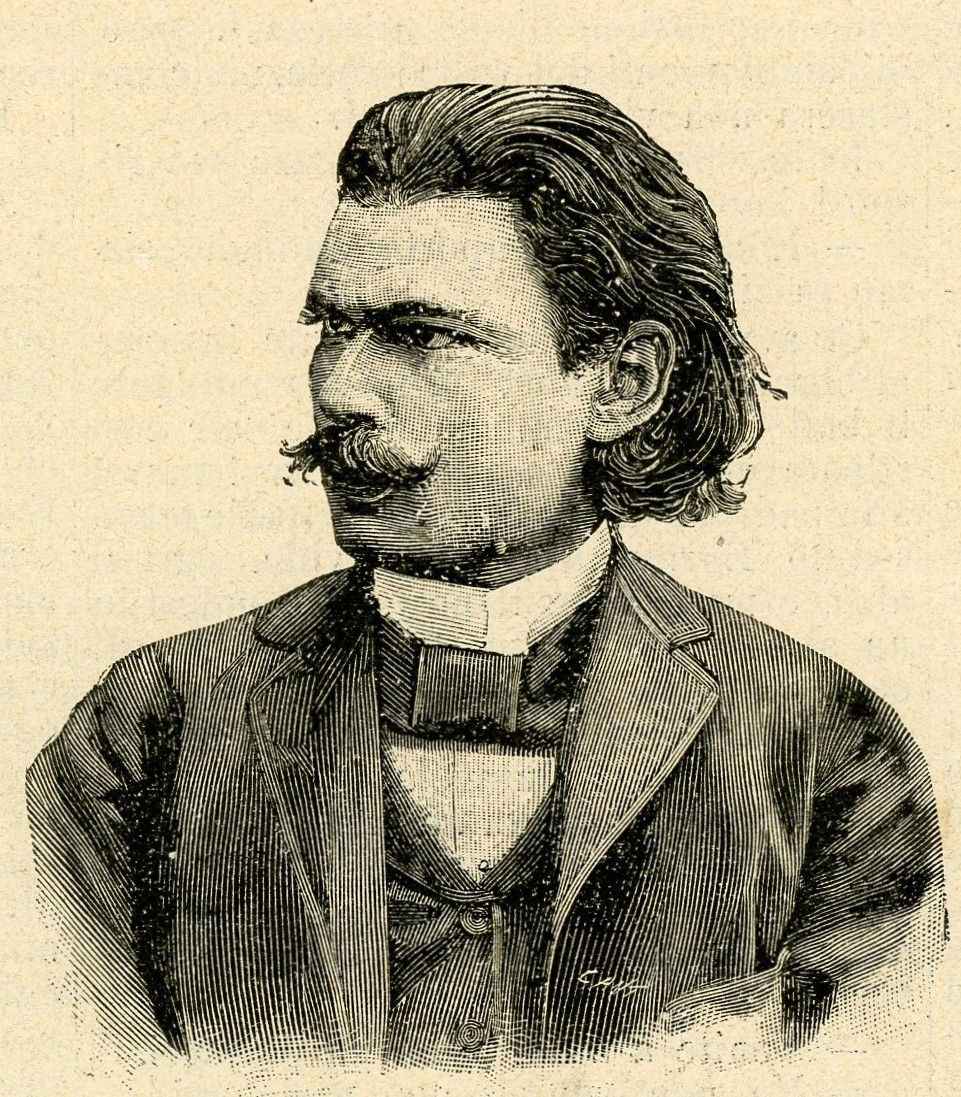
Photograph of Marco Anzoletti

== Orchestral works ==
#	Title	Scoring	Date	Notes
=== Symphonies ===
	Symphony in C minor	orchestra	1896	
	Symphony No. 1 in D minor	orchestra	1897	
	Symphony No. 2 in D minor	orchestra	1897	
	Symphony in A minor	orchestra	1897	
	Symphony in F minor	orchestra	1897	
	Symphony in G minor	orchestra	1898	
	Symphony in G major	orchestra	1898	
	Symphony in C major	orchestra	1898	incomplete
	Symphony in D major	orchestra	1898	incomplete
	Symphony in F major	orchestra	1898	incomplete
	Symphony in A major	orchestra	1898	
	Symphony in One Movement in A minor	orchestra	1899	
	Symphony - Overture in C major	orchestra	1899	
	I Album Sinfonico	orchestra	1899	
	II Album Sinfonico	orchestra	1899	
	Symphony - Overture in B♭ major	orchestra	1900	
=== Symphonic Poems ===
	Symphonic Poem "I Serpenti"	orchestra	1885	
	Symphonic Poem "Il Conte Ugolino"	orchestra	1885	
	Symphonic Poem "Caino e Abele"	orchestra	1885	
	Symphonic Poem "David"	orchestra	1885	
=== Overtures ===
	Overture in E♭ major	orchestra	1901	
	Overture in F major	orchestra	1901	
	Overture in D♭ major	orchestra	1901	
	Overture in C minor	orchestra	1901	
	Overture Eroicomica in C major	orchestra		
	Overture in G major	orchestra		
=== Suites ===
	Suite for orchestra	orchestra	1893	
	Suite (Aurora Urbis Aeternae)	orchestra		arr. for piano
=== Dances ===
	Gran Polonaise in E major	orchestra	1885	
	4 Dances	orchestra	1886	
	Festa Popolare Normanna - Dance	orchestra		
	Trionfo Barbaro	orchestra		
=== Other orchestral works ===
	Vittoria Normanna (Kenig[sic]-Marsch)	orchestra	1895	
	Egloga	orchestra	1895	
	Nathos e Dartula	orchestra	1895	
	Gran Marcia Slava in G minor	orchestra	1896	incomplete
	Militza or Serbia	orchestra	1896-1897	
	La fine di Mozart	orchestra	1898	
	Le Gare	orchestra	1902	
	Variations in C major	orchestra	1903	
	Faida	orchestra	1910-1915	
	Variations on 2 J.S.Bach's St.Matthew Passion Chorales, in B minor and in E major	orchestra	1911	
	L'ospite della Terra	orchestra	1914	
	Cammino Funebre in B♭ major	orchestra	1917	
	Belfagor	orchestra	1920	
	Nostalgie Autunnali	orchestra		
=== Violin and Orchestra ===
	Le Rêve, Berceuse in B♭ major	violin and orchestra	1888	
	Concerto No. 1 in G major	violin and orchestra	1896	
	Concerto No. 1 in A major	violin and orchestra	1899	
	Concerto in F major	violin and orchestra	1899	
	Concerto di studio in B minor	violin and orchestra	1901	
	Concerto in F♯ minor	violin and orchestra	1903	
	Allegro di Concerto in E minor	violin and orchestra	1903	
	Concerto in A minor	violin and orchestra	1912	
	Concerto in G minor	violin and orchestra	1912	
	Gran Tempesta – Fantasia Sinfonica sopra Temi di Niccolò Paganini	violin and orchestra	1912	
	Concerto in C major	violin and orchestra	1920	
	Concerto No. 2 in G major	violin and orchestra	1920	
	Concerto in F♯ major	violin and orchestra	1920	
	Concerto in E minor	violin and orchestra	1920	
	Concerto No. 2 in A major	violin and orchestra	1921	
	Concerto in B major	violin and orchestra	1921	
	Concerto in E major	violin and orchestra	1921	
	Concerto in B♭ major	violin and orchestra	1921	
	Concerto in D major	violin and orchestra		
=== Viola and Orchestra ===
	Concerto No. 1 in F minor	viola and orchestra	1900	
	Concerto No. 2 in B major	viola and orchestra	1915	
=== Violin/Viola and Orchestra ===
	Concerto in C major for violin and viola (one soloist, two instruments)	violin/viola and orchestra	1915	
=== 2 Violins and Orchestra ===
	Concerto in D minor	2 violins and orchestra	1902	
	Concerto in D major	2 violins and orchestra	1906	
=== 3 Violins and Orchestra ===
	Concerto in F major	3 violins and orchestra	1905	
	Concerto in A minor	3 violins and orchestra	1906	
=== 4 Violins and Orchestra ===
	Concerto in D minor	4 violins and orchestra	1905	
	Concerto in A major	4 violins and orchestra	1905	
=== Violin, Cello and Orchestra ===
	Concerto in C major	violin, cello and orchestra	1906	
== Chamber works ==
=== Music without Piano ===
	Sonata II in C minor	violin and cello		
	Sonata in C minor	violin and cello		
	Sonata in E♭ major	viola and cello	1901	
	Sonata in G minor	viola and cello	1901	
	Trio in G major	2 flutes and harp		
	Quartet No. 1 in C major	2 violins, viola, cello	1906	
	Quartet in A minor	2 violins, viola, cello	1907	
	Quartet in A major	2 violins, viola, cello	1907	
	Quartet in D minor	2 violins, viola, cello	1908	
	Quartet in C minor	2 violins, viola, cello	1908	
	Quartet No. 2 in C major	2 violins, viola, cello	1908	
	Quartet in G major	2 violins, viola, cello	1909	
	Quartet in D major	2 violins, viola, cello	1909	
	Quartet in E♭ minor	2 violins, viola, cello	1911	
	Quartet in F♯ major	2 violins, viola, cello	1911	
	Quartet in F♯ minor	2 violins, viola, cello	1911	
	Adagio in C minor	2 violins, viola, cello		
	Quintet in G major	2 violins, 2 violas, cello	1903	
	Quintet in C minor	2 violins, 2 violas, cello	1903	
	Quintet in F♯ minor	oboe, 2 violins, viola, cello	1904	
	Quintet in B major	clarinet, 2 violins, viola, cello	1903	
	Quintet in G major	flute, 2 violins, viola, cello	1905	
	Quintet in G major	2 violins, viola, 2 cellos	1906	
	Quintet in G major	flute, oboe, clarinet, bassoon, french horn	1906	
	Quintet in G major	2 violins, viola, 2 cellos	1909	
	Sextet I in G major	2 violins, 2 violas, 2 cellos	1903	
	Sextet II in E♭ major	2 violins, 2 violas, 2 cellos	1903	
	Octet in F major	4 violins, 2 violas, 2 cellos	1903	incomplete
	Nonet in C major	4 violins, 2 violas, 2 cellos and continuo	1903	incomplete
=== Violin and Piano ===
	Tarantella di Concerto in A♭ major	violin and piano	1885	
	2 Sonate No. 1 in D minor	violin and piano	1894	
	Allegretto in F major	violin and piano	1884	incomplete
	Aracne in G major	violin and piano	1887	
	Andante in F major	violin and piano	1887	
	Serenatina in G major	violin and piano	1887	
	Fuga No. 1 in B minor	violin and piano	1889	
	Fuga No. 2 in B minor	violin and piano	1889	
	Andante in B major	violin and piano	1889	
	Prelude, Les chauve-souris in B minor	violin and piano	1889	
	La distruction de Ninive in B major	violin and piano	1889	
	Allegretto in D minor	violin and piano	1889	
	Scherzo in F major	violin and piano	1889	
	Andante No. 1 in G major	violin and piano	1889	
	2 Composizioni: Minuetto Italiano in A major / Gavotta Italiana e Musetta in G major	violin and piano	1890-1902	
	2 Humoreske in B♭ major and D major	violin and piano	1889	
	Danza No. 10 in G minor	violin and piano	1889	
	Scena Lirica in E major	violin and piano	1890	
	Tarantella in G minor	violin and piano	1889	
	Danza in D minor	violin and piano	1889	
	Le Chant d'Archemoro in G minor	violin and piano	1889	
	Presto No. 1 in G minor	violin and piano	1891	
	Berceuse No. 1 in G major	violin and piano	1891	
	Berceuse No. 2 in G major	violin and piano		
	Fantasia alla Spagnuola in A minor	violin and piano	1891	
	Alla Spagnuola, Caprice in A minor	violin and piano	1891	
	Danza No. 11, No. 12, No. 13 in G minor	violin and piano	1891	
	Allegretto grazioso in B♭ major	violin and piano	1891	
	Allegretto in B♭ major	violin and piano	1891	
	Adagio espressivo in B♭ major	violin and piano	1891	
	Allegro in G minor	violin and piano	1891	
	Allegrino in B♭ major	violin and piano	1891	
	Moderato in G minor	violin and piano	1891	incomplete
	Preludio-Caprice in G minor	violin and piano	1891	
	Impromptu-Gavotte in G minor	violin and piano	1891	
	Variations on a Theme of J.Brahms in A minor	violin and piano	1891	
	3 Sonatas in D minor	violin and piano	1891	
	2 Sonatas No. 1 in C major	violin and piano	1891	
	2 Sonatas in F major	violin and piano	1891	
	2 Sonatas in F minor	violin and piano	1891	
	Suite in D minor	violin and piano	1891	
	Suite in G major	violin and piano	1891	
	Suite in G major	violin and piano	1891	
	Suite in E major	violin and piano	1891	
	3 Sonatas No. 1 in D major	violin and piano	1891	
	Berceuse in G minor	violin and piano	1891	
	Tema originale variato in B minor	violin and piano	1891	
	Variations on a Theme of J.Haydn in D major	violin and piano	1891	
	Reminescenze d'Italia (6 pezzi)	violin and piano	1891	
	Sonata Fantastica - Idillio del Diavolo in D minor	violin and piano	1891	
	Presto e Lentamente in D major	violin and piano	1891	
	Romance - Nocturne in D♭ major	violin and piano	1891	
	Sonata in A minor	violin and piano	1891	
	Polonaise in C minor	violin and piano	1904	
	Polonaise Brillante in A major	violin and piano	1904	
	Polonaise in D major	violin and piano	1904	
	Polonaise in G major	violin and piano	1904	
	Polonaise in E major	violin and piano	1904	
	Polonaise in E minor	violin and piano	1904	
	Polonaise in G minor	violin and piano	1904	
	Polonaise in A major	violin and piano	1904	
	Polonaise in F minor	violin and piano	1904	
	Polonaise in F♯ minor	violin and piano	1904	
	Sonata No. 1 in E major	violin and piano	1904	
	2 Concert Caprice in D major and in G major	violin and piano	1905	
	Rondò fantastico in C major	violin and piano	1904	
	Sonata in G minor	violin and piano	1904	
	Nocturne in D major	violin and piano	1904	
	Pensiero Dominante, Andante in A major	violin and piano	1904	
	Preghiera e Ninna Nanna in C major and in F major	violin and piano	1904	
	Legende in D minor	violin and piano	1904	
	Fantasia - Ballata senza parole in G minor	violin and piano	1904	
	La magica lanterna in A major	violin and piano	1904	
	Mazurka in G major	violin and piano	1907	
	Mazurka in B major	violin and piano	1907	
	Mazurka in F♯ minor	violin and piano	1908	
	Gran Studio in C major	violin and piano	1907	
	Studio Sinfonico No. 1 in C minor	violin and piano	1908	
	Studio Sinfonico No. 2 in F minor	violin and piano	1908	
	Scene de Valse in E major	violin and piano	1908	
	Contemplazione, Anime pellegrinanti in E major	violin and piano	1908	
	Fantasia e Tema variato in A minor	violin and piano	1908	
	Sonata No. 1 in F♯ minor	violin and piano	1908	
	Sonata in E♭ major	violin and piano	1908	
	Sarabanda Variata of J.S.Bach in E major	violin and piano	1908	
	Variazione e Fuga on a Theme of G.Tartini in F major	violin and piano	1908	
	Gran Studio di Concerto in G major	violin and piano	1908	
	Preludio, Variazioni e Fuga on a Theme by A.Corelli in G minor, B♭ major and A♭ major	violin and piano	1908	
	Fantasia di Concerto on La Fanciulla del West by G.Puccini in C major	violin and piano	1915	
	L'Odissea di un popolo, Poema in 16 Canti	violin and piano	1908	
	L'Albero di Natale - Variations on a Theme by A.Corelli in E♭ major	violin and piano	1908	
	Fuga on a Theme of Devil's Trill by G.Tartini in G minor	violin and piano	1908	
	Dai monti trentini - 6 impressioni pittoriche	violin and piano	1908	
	Il Picchiettato - Sixth Gran Studio di Concerto in F♯ minor	violin and piano	1908	
	Fantasia in B♭ major	violin and piano	1908	
	Sonata in G major	violin and piano	1918	
	Sonata in A major	violin and piano	1918	
	Sonata in B♭ major	violin and piano	1918	
	Studio di Concerto in D minor	violin and piano	1918	
	Sonata in A♭ major	violin and piano	1918	
	Sonata in B minor	violin and piano	1918	
	Fantasia in F♯ major	violin and piano	1918	
	Sonata in C♯ minor	violin and piano	1918	
	Sonata No. 2 in E major	violin and piano	1918	
	Soldati di Stagno e Bambole di Legno, 12 Piccoli Pezzi	violin and piano	1919	
	16 Variations on a Theme by P. Rovelli in B♭ major	violin and piano	1918	
	Nel mondo degli elfi, 7 Danze	violin and piano	1918	
	Poema in E minor	violin and piano	1918	
	Il Carnevale di Venezia, op.80 in A minor	violin and piano	1918	
	Carme I in E major	violin and piano	1922	
	Carme II in C major	violin and piano	1922	
	Pace d'Ignote Sponde, Carme in E major	violin and piano	1922	
	Le Cariti, 3 Melodie	violin and piano	1922	
	Il Cammino dei Penitenti (Fantasia di Giorni Lontani) in E major	violin and piano	1922	
	Alla Turca in A major	violin and piano	1922	
	Tamburino: Danza in F major	violin and piano	1922	
	Rigaudon in D major	violin and piano	1922	
	Dance-Caprice in D minor	violin and piano	1922	
	Ballata in G minor No. 1	violin and piano	1923	
	Ballata in B♭ minor No. 2	violin and piano	1923	
	Ballata in E♭ major No. 3	violin and piano	1923	
	Ballata in D minor No. 4	violin and piano	1923	
	Ballata in A major No. 5	violin and piano	1923	
	Ballata in B minor No. 6	violin and piano	1923	
	Fantasia - Allegro in G minor	violin and piano	1923	
	2 Romanze in G major	violin and piano	1923	
	Serenata delle stelle in D major	violin and piano	1923	
	Largo	violin and piano	1923	
	Proemium-Sarabanda-Allegro in E minor, in G major, in E minor	violin and piano	1923	
	Armonie di vita, Poema in E♭ major	violin and piano	1923	
	Cantilena in A minor	violin and piano	1923	
	La Falena, Scherzo in B♭ major	violin and piano	1923	
	Sospiro d'un Esule in B minor	violin and piano	1923	
	La Mosca, Scherzo	violin and piano	1923	
	Le contemplazioni	violin and piano	1923	
	"La Batracomiomachia” ossia Guerra dei topi e delle rane - Fantasia	violin and piano	1923	
	Fantasia in forma di Variazioni sopra in canto d'una pazza	violin and piano	1923	
	9 Rune	violin and piano	1923	
	7 Quadri Apocalittici in A major	violin and piano	1923	
	Il giovin signore, Minuetto in E major	violin and piano	1923	
	3 Corali (E♭ major, C major, B minor)	violin and piano	1923	
	Andante in G major No. 2	violin and piano	1923	
	Arietta in G major	violin and piano		
	Fantasia in G minor	violin and piano		
	Gavotta Fantastica, o delle Ombre, o degli Spettri in B♭ major	violin and piano		
	Giga in B minor	violin and piano		
	Grand Polonaise in E major	violin and piano		
	Il segreto d'un fiore, in G major	violin and piano		
	Intermezzo in A major	violin and piano		
	Introduzione, Adagio e Polonaise Variata in E♭ major	violin and piano		
	Introduzione e Variazioni on "Nel Cor più non mi Sento" by N.Paganini	violin and piano		
	L'apparition de St. Agnes in G minor	violin and piano		
	La Primavera in A major	violin and piano		
	La ridda delle ottave - Grande Studio di Concerto No. 3 in G minor	violin and piano		
	Legende in G major	violin and piano		
	Luci ed ombre in E minor	violin and piano		
	Melancolie: Morceau in G minor	violin and piano		
	Menuet in E major	violin and piano		
	Moto Perpetuo Doppio in C major	2 violins and piano		
	Moto Perpetuo - 2nd Grande Studio di Concerto in B♭ minor	violin and piano		
	2 Bolero in A minor	violin and piano		
	2 Caprices in D major	violin and piano		
	2 Gavotte in G minor	violin and piano		
	2 Suites in B minor	violin and piano		
	9 Danze in D minor	violin and piano		
	9 Danze in G minor	violin and piano		
	Notturno e Paesaggio a Caresolo in G♯ minor and E minor	violin and piano		
	Nocturne in A minor	violin and piano		
	"Oh, dolce rimembrar..." in F major	violin and piano		
	Preghiera della sera in C♭ minor	violin and piano		
	Preghiera del mattino in E minor	2 violins and piano		
	Presto No. 2 in G minor	violin and piano		
	Recitativo in D major	violin and piano		
	Romance in C major	violin and piano		
	Romance in D major	violin and piano		
	Siciliana in A minor and Giga in G major	violin and piano		
	Siciliano - Allegretto in D major	violin and piano		
	Sonata No. 2 in F♯ minor	violin and piano		
	Sonata No. 3 in F minor	violin and piano		
	Souvenir in E major	violin and piano		
	Studio Sinfonico No. 2 in C minor	violin and piano		
	Suite in A major	violin and piano		
	Suite Chantecler in D major	violin and piano		
	Veglie settecentesche	violin and piano		
	Vivace Scherzando in E major	violin and piano		
=== Viola and Piano ===
	Sonata in B♭ major	viola and piano	1900	
	Scherzo in D major	viola and piano		
	Composizioni - Due Tombe: Moderato assai in D minor	violin and piano		
=== Cello and Piano ===
	Suite in D minor	cello and piano	1896	
	Il mattino e Piccola Fantasia	cello and piano	after 1903	
	Sonata in F major	cello and piano	1903	
	Sonata in D major	cello and piano	1903	
	Sonata No. 1 in G major	cello and piano	1903	
	Sonata No. 2 in G major	cello and piano		
	Sonata in A major	cello and piano	1903	
	Sonata in D minor	cello and piano		
=== Other music with Piano ===
	8 Danze	violin, cello and piano	1892	
	Quartet No. 1 in E♭ major	violin, viola, cello and piano	1892	
	Quartet in C major	violin, viola, cello and piano	1892	
	Quintet No. 1 in E♭ major	2 violins, viola, cello and piano	1893	incomplete
	Sextet II in C minor	2 violins, 2 violas, cello and piano	1892	
	Trio No. 1 in G minor	violin, cello and piano	1893	
	Trio No. 2 in G major	violin, cello and piano	1893	
	Trio No. 1 in C minor	violin, cello and piano	1895	
	Kleine Gemälde	violin, cello and piano	1896	
	Trio in E minor	violin, cello and piano	1898	
	Trio No. 2 in G minor	violin, cello and piano	1899	
	Trio in D major	violin, cello and piano	1900	
	Trio in F minor	violin, cello and piano	1901	
	Trio in F major	violin, cello and piano	1901	
	Quartet in B minor	violin, viola, cello and piano	1902	
	Quintet No. 2 in E♭ major	2 violins, viola, cello and piano	1903	
	Trio No. 3 in G minor	violin, cello and piano	1903	
	Trio in A minor	violin, cello and piano	1904	
	Trio in E major	violin, cello and piano	1905	
	Trio No. 2 in E♭ major	violin, cello and piano	1905	
	Trio No. 3 in B♭ major	clarinet, cello and piano	1905	
	Trio No. 2 in F major	violin, horn (or cello) and piano	1905	
	Quintet in E♭ major	oboe, clarinet, bassoon, french horn and piano	1905	
	Quartet in B♭ major	violin, viola, cello and piano	1905	
	Trio in B minor	violin, cello and piano	1906	
	Quintet in B major	2 violins, viola, cello and piano	1907	
	Minuet in B minor	violin, cello and piano	1908 approx.	
	Trio in F♯ minor	violin, cello and piano	1908	
	10 Racconti in B minor	violin, cello and piano	28 May 1913	
	Serenata Lombarda in D major	2 violins and piano	1913	
	Quintet in D♭ major	2 violins, viola, cello and piano	1915	
	Fantasia Variata on a Theme by N.Paganini in E minor	2 violins, viola and piano	1915	
	L'Albero di Natale, Variations on a Theme by W.A.Mozart in A major	2 violins, cello and piano	1917	
	Parasceve, Tema composto per il giorno di Pasqua in E♭ major	2 violin, cello and piano	1918	
	6 Danze No. 1	violin, cello and piano		
	6 Danze No. 2	violin, cello and piano		
	8 Danze No. 1	violin, cello and piano		
	8 Danze No. 2	violin, cello and piano		
	Quartet in C minor	violin, viola, cello and piano		
	Quartet in F major	violin, viola, cello and piano		
	Quartet No. 2 in E♭ major	violin, viola, cello and piano		
	Sextet I in G major	2 violins, 2 violas, cello and piano		incomplete
	Trio in A major	violin, cello and piano		
	Trio in D major	violin, cello and piano		
	Trio in D minor	violin, cello and piano		
	Trio No. 1 in C major	violin, cello and piano		
	Trio No. 1 in E♭ major	violin, cello and piano		
	Trio No. 1 in B♭ major	violin, cello and piano		
	Trio No. 1 in G major	violin, cello and piano		
	Trio No. 2 in B♭ major	violin, cello and piano		
	Trio No. 2 in C major	violin, cello and piano		
	Trio No. 1 in C minor	violin, cello and piano		
	Ultimo pensiero in E major	violin, cello and piano		
=== Music with Organ ===
	Fuga in B minor	violin and organ (or piano)	1892	
	Sonata in G minor	violin and organ	1904	
	Sonata in F major	viola and organ	1904	
	Sonata in D major	cello and organ	1904	
	Fantasia Sacra in F minor	2 organs	1904	
== Keyboard works ==
=== Piano solo ===
	Sonata in C minor	piano solo	1888	
	5 Cammino funebre	piano solo	1917	
	Sinfonia - Overture in C major	piano solo	1899	orchestral reduction
	Alla Città di Ferrara	piano solo	1918	
	25 Variations on J.S.Bach' s Chorale "Herr Gott, nun schleuss’ den Himmel auf!”	piano solo	1924	
	Inno Imperiale	piano solo	1926	
	25 Variations on J.S.Bach' s Chorale "Herr Gott, nun schleuss’ den Himmel auf!”	piano solo	1924	
	Allegro Risoluto in E♭ major	piano solo		
	Aurora Urbis Aeternae	piano solo		orchestral reduction
	Sonata in A major	piano solo		
=== Organ solo ===
	Intermezzo in C major	organ solo	1908	
	Toccata in E minor	organ solo	1908	
	Fantasia - Fuga - Postludio	organ solo		
	Fantasia sacra in E minor	organ solo		
	Postludio in C major	organ solo		
	Preludio alla fantasia - Fuga in E minor	organ solo		
	Preludio in A minor	organ solo		
	Preludio Pastorale in G major	organ solo		
	Preludio - Toccata - Fuga - Intermezzo in F minor	organ solo		
=== Violin solo ===
	5 Gran Caprices in C major	violin solo	1884	
	Sonata in stile antico	violin solo	1908	
	32 Preludes in all keys	violin solo	1909	
	Serenata in G major	violin solo	1909	
	Fantasia Caprice in A major	violin solo	1913	
	Aria e Fuga on the name of Bach in B♭ major	violin solo	1913	
	"Labyrinthos" 104 Variations	violin solo	1916	
	Aria e Fuga Sopra un Tema del Trillo del Diavolo	violin solo	1916	
	3 Preludes	violin solo		
	36 Preludes	violin solo		
	Esercizi	violin solo		
	Moto perpetuo sopra movimenti di scale	violin solo		
	Sarabanda variata	violin solo		
	Una frase di Bach variata	violin solo		
=== Viola solo ===
	12 Etudes	viola solo	1919	Milan, Ricordi
	12 Etudes op.125	viola solo	1929	Milan, Ricordi
