= Marco Misciagna =

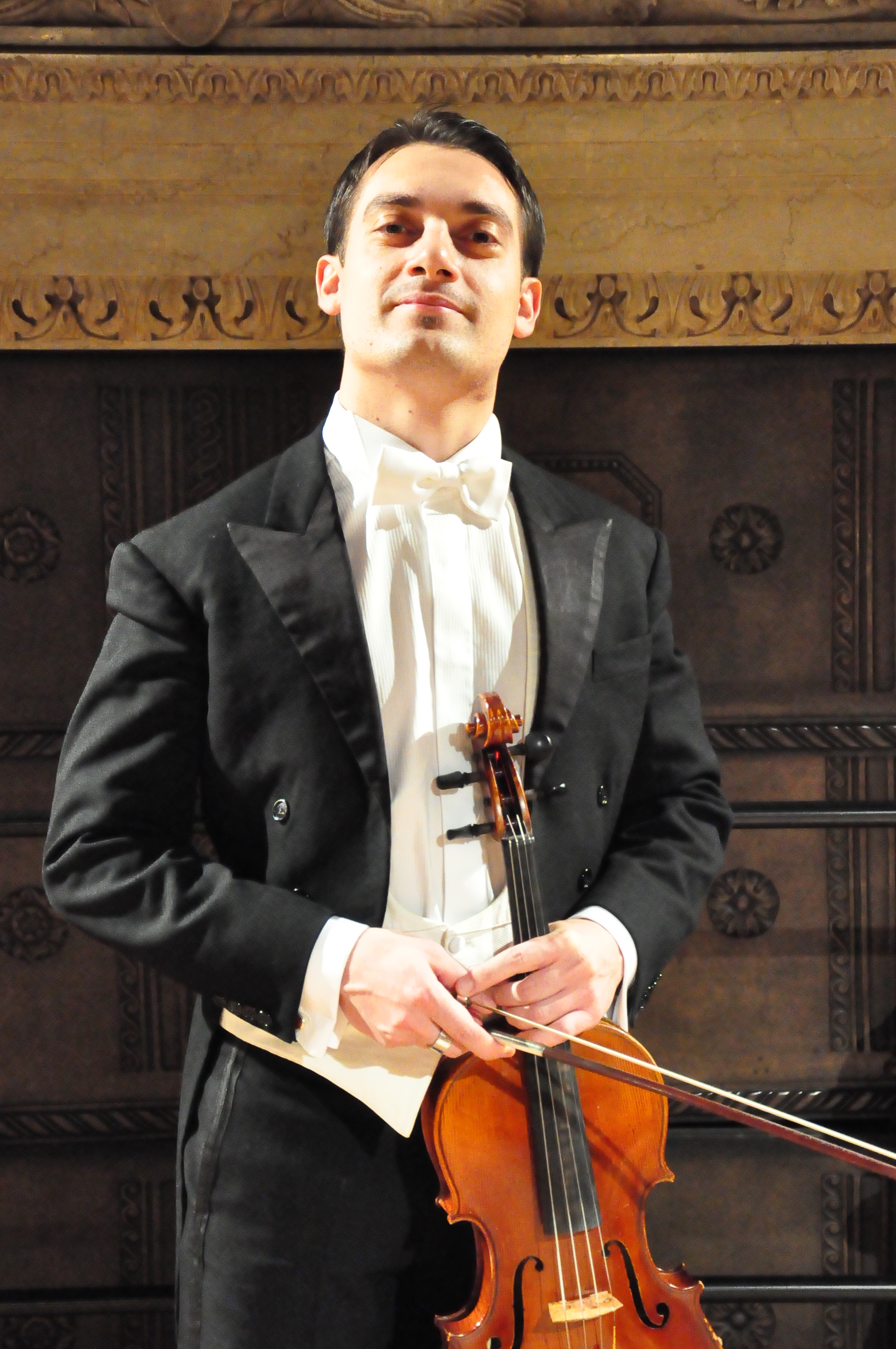

Background information
- Born: 5 February 1984 (age 42); Bari, Italy
- Genre: Classical
- Occupations: Violist, violinist
- Instruments: Viola, violin
- Label: Brilliant Classics
- Website: https://www.marcomisciagna.com/

Marco Misciagna (Italian pronunciation: [ˈmarko miʃˈʃaɲɲa]; born 5 February 1984) is an Italian violinist and violist acclaimed for his international solo and chamber music career, his contributions to expanding the viola repertoire, and his role as an educator.

== Biography ==
=== Musical education ===
Marco Misciagna was born in Bari, Italy. He graduated at the age of 15 in violin and viola from the Niccolò Piccinni Conservatory of Bari and later obtained the diploma at the National Academy of Santa Cecilia in Rome. He was invited by the then-President of the Italian Republic Carlo Azeglio Ciampi to the Quirinal Palace in Rome, as the best student of the conservatory. He studied with Corrado Romano, Eduard Grach and with Đorđe Trkulja (former first violin of Zagreb Quartet). Further studies included Salvatore Accardo at the Accademia Stauffer in Cremona, Boris Belkin and Jury Bashmet at the Accademia Chigiana in Siena, where he was awarded two Honour Diplomas and won the Prize Monte dei Paschi di Siena twice, as best violinist and best violist in the school (first time in the history of the Academy).

=== Career ===
In 1999 he won the First Prize for young talented musicians "M. Benvenuti" of Vittorio Veneto.

For years, he served as a soloist of the Spanish String Orchestra of Màlaga and has performed in major halls and international institutions worldwide, including the Berliner Philarmonie, Essen Philarmonie, Hamburg Laieszahalle, Mannheim Rosengarten, the Meistersingerhalle Nuremberg, the Prinzeregententheater of Monaco, Arriaga Theater in Bilbao, Musikverein in Vienna, Victoria Eugenia Theater in San Sebastian, Komitas Chamber Music Hall, Kiev Opera House, Dar Sebastian in Tunisia, Sala Sinopoli Auditorium Parco della Musica in Rome, Teatro di San Carlo in Naples, Teatro Colón in Buenos Aires, Balboa Theatre in San Diego in California, Fox Tucson Theatre, St. Francis Auditorium of Santa Fe in New Mexico, C.W. Eisemann Center, Rudder Theater, Empire Theater in Texas, American Theater in Hampton in Virginia, Lehman Center and Carnegie Hall in New York.

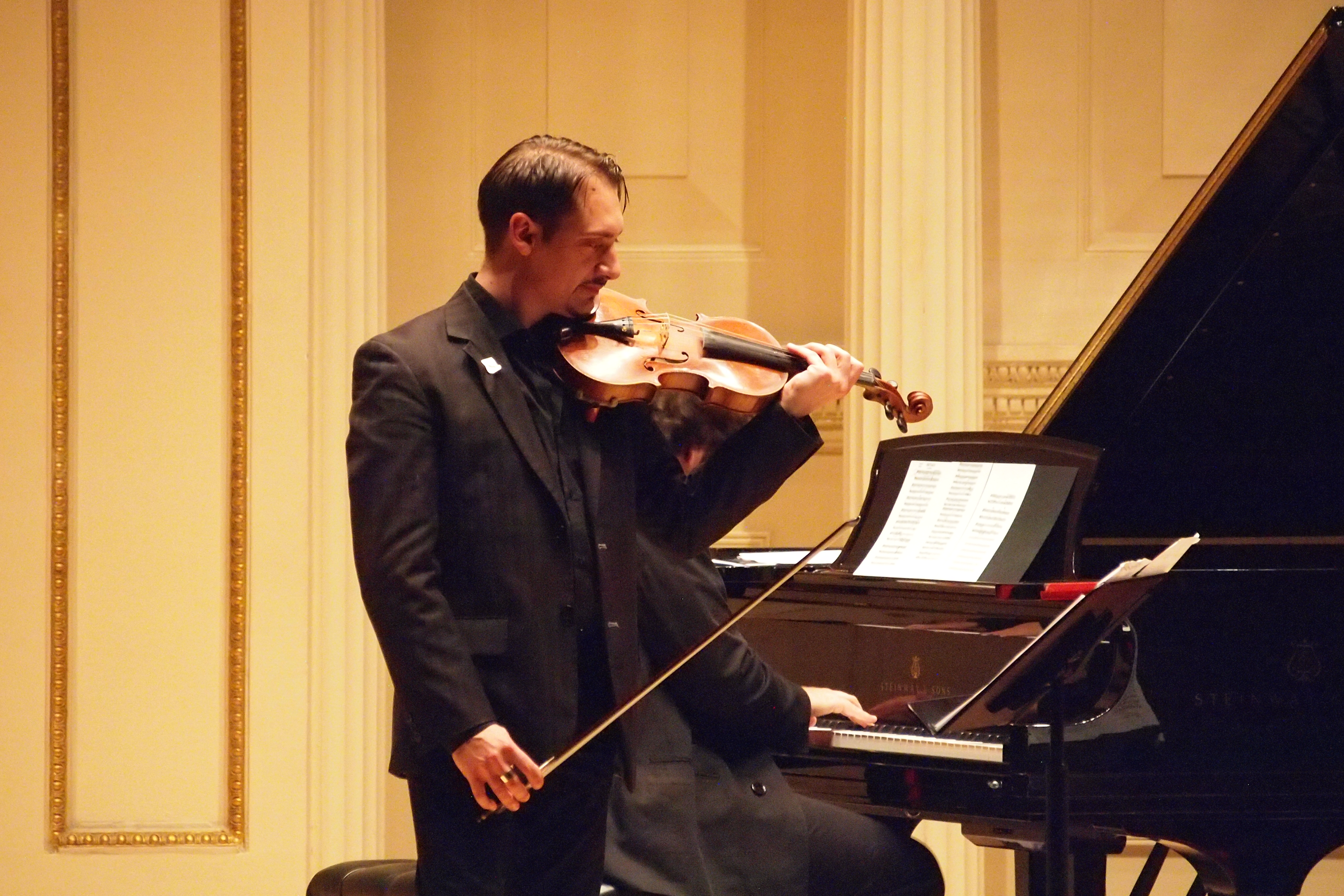
Misciagna during concert at Carnegie Hall in New York on 23 May 2015

He has collaborated with Uto Ughi, Alexander Rudin, Sergey Stadler, Alexander Markov, Mariana Sirbu, Gianluigi Gelmetti, Mario Benzecry, Ramin Bahrami, Rocco Filippini, Stephen Burns, Antony Pay, Franco Petracchi, Muhai Tang, José Serebrier, and Vladimir Zubitsky.

He is an honorary principal soloist of the Arkhangelsk State Chamber Orchestra, Camerata Esteban Salas and the Orchestra Sinfonica de Oriente (Cuba).

In 2018, he received the Gold Medal from the Deputy Prime Minister of Ukraine for the commemoration of the 150th Anniversary of the Kiev Opera House.

He is an Officer of the Volunteer Military Corps of the Italian Red Cross, auxiliary of the Armed Forces, with Decree of the President of the Republic.

=== Teaching and Academic Positions ===
He is a viola professor at Nino Rota Music Conservatory in Monopoli and an Adjunct professor of violin and viola at the Music and Performing Arts Department of Bilkent University in Ankara.

He is also an Honorary Professor at S.Rachmaninov State Conservatory in Tambov; Far Eastern State Academy of Art in Vladivostok (Russia); Institut Supérieur de Musique de Sousse (University of Sousse, Tunisia); Estaban Salas Conservatory in Santiago de Cuba; Pettman National Junior Academy of Music (Auckland, New Zealand); Komitas State Conservatory of Yerevan (Armenia).

=== Special Recording Projects and Cultural Initiatives ===
Marco Misciagna has been involved in various recording projects with philanthropic and cultural purposes. He released a CD, produced by Dynamic and sponsored by the Lions Club, with proceeds donated to a charitable initiative aimed at constructing a multifunctional center for children. He also recorded, as a world premiere with DAD-Records, the Quintet Op. 128 and Rhapsody Op. 88 by Raffaele Gervasio, contributing to the revival of lesser-known Italian repertoire.

His CD Album dedicated to Bartolomeo Campagnoli's 41 Caprices for viola op.22, arranged for viola and piano by Carl Albert Tottmann, produced by Brilliant Classics, was awarded of two Global Music Awards Gold Medals.

He participated in the radio program Vite in Musica (13 episodes), broadcast on RaiPlay Sound, which was dedicated to the Italian composer Marco Anzoletti. The program, focusing on the life and works of Anzoletti, featured Misciagna's performances and interpretations of the composer's music. Misciagna's involvement in the broadcast helped bring renewed attention to Anzoletti's works, offering listeners insight into the composer's contributions to Italian music. Misciagna was also the first and only to perform Anzoletti's Concerto for Violin/Viola (1 Soloist) and Orchestra, a rare work in which the soloist alternates between the violin and the viola, showcasing both instruments in a single performance. His interpretation contributed significantly to the revival of interest in Anzoletti's repertoire.

== Discography ==
=== Albums ===
- Note di Solidarietà per Casalnuovo Monterotaro: Works by Henri Wieniawski, Heinrich Wilhelm Ernst and Niccolò Paganini. Dynamic (CDT5065). Marco Misciagna (violin). Released 2003
- Christmas In Classic: Classical Christmas arrangements for violin/viola & guitar. Includes: Joy To The World, Silent Night, We Wish You A Merry Christmas, Jingle Bells. Marco Misciagna (violin), Vito Vilardi (guitar). Terramiamusic. Released 2010
- Carulli, Giuliani, Paganini - Includes: Fantasia con variazioni sulle arie de La Gazza Ladra by Ferdinando Carulli; Grand Duo Concertant Op. 85 by Mauro Giuliani; Sonatas Nos. 1, 2 & 6 Op. 2 by Niccolò Paganini. Marco Misciagna (violin), Vito Vilardi (guitar). Digressione Music (DCTT113). Released 2018
- The Curve Of A Day: L'ultima strada di Janusz Korczak (violin) - Canto Per Groznyj (viola). Marco Misciagna (violin, viola). Idyllium. Released 2016
- Sette - Marco Misciagna (violin). Digressione Music (DIGR77). Released 2017
- Chamber and Piano Solo Works, Vol. 3 - Marco Misciagna (viola). IMD. Released 2020
- Beautiful Melodies for Viola and Piano: Works by Johann Sebastian Bach, Johann Georg Benda, Joseph Haydn, Camille Saint-Saëns, Claude Debussy. Marco Misciagna (viola). IMD100. Released 2021
- The Greatest Movie Soundtracks for Viola and Piano - Includes: Gabriel's Oboe, Over The Rainbow, Summertime, Last Tango In Paris, Merry Christmas Mr. Lawrence. Marco Misciagna (viola). IMD200. Released 2022
- Maurice Vieux - Complete Music for Unaccompanied Viola (World Premiere Recording): Includes 20 Études (1927); 10 Études sur des traits d'orchestre (1928); 10 Études sur les intervalles (1931); 10 Études nouvelles (1956). Marco Misciagna (viola). Digressione Music (DCTT129). Released 2022
- Bartolomeo Campagnoli: 41 Caprices for Viola, Op. 22, arranged for Viola and Piano by Carl Albert Tottmann. Marco Misciagna (viola). Brilliant Classics (96551). Released 2022
- Federigo Fiorillo: 36 Caprices Op.3 for Violin, Transcribed for Viola by Marco Misciagna. Marco Misciagna (viola). Brilliant Classics (97018). Released 2023
- Albrecht Blumenstengel: 24 Etudes Op.33 for Violin, Transcribed for Viola by Marco Misciagna. Marco Misciagna (viola). MM. Released 2023
- Richard Hofmann: 15 Studies Op.87 for Viola, Marco Misciagna (viola). MM. Released 2024
- Francesco Paolo Supriani: 12 Toccatas for Cello, Transcribed for Viola by Marco Misciagna. Marco Misciagna (viola). MM. Released 2024
- Émile Poilleux: 20 Études chantantes et caractéristiques for Violin, Transcribed for Viola by Marco Misciagna. Marco Misciagna (viola). MM. Released 2024
- Antonio Bartolomeo Bruni: 25 Etudes for Viola (World Premiere Recording). Marco Misciagna (viola). MM. Released 2024
- Franz Anton Hoffmeister: 12 Etudes for Viola. Marco Misciagna (viola). MM. Released 2025
- Agustín Barrios Mangoré: Compositions Arranged for Viola Solo by Marco Misciagna - Julia Florida; Las Abejas; Canción de Cuna; Leyenda de España; La Catedral (I. Preludio Saudade, II. Andante Religioso, III. Allegro Solemne); Una Limosna por el Amor de Dios; Preludio; Capricho Español; Gavota al Estilo Antiguo; Villancico de Navidad. Marco Misciagna (viola). MM. Released 2025
- Georg Abraham Schneider: 6 Solos for Viola, Op. 19 & Variations, Op. 44 (arranged for viola by Marco Misciagna). Marco Misciagna (viola). MM. Released 2025
- Alessandro Rolla: Complete Works for Solo Viola, BI. 310–322 – Intonazione No. 1 in C Major, BI 310; Esercizio (Caprice) No. 2 in E-flat Major, BI 311; Intonazione No. 2 in F Major, BI 312; Esercizio (Caprice) No. 1 in F Major, BI 313; Esercizio e Arpeggio (Caprice) No. 3 in G Major, BI 314; Giro Armonico, BI 315; Andante patetico (Vaccaj: Giulietta e Romeo, Act III), BI 316; Andante (Rossini: Demetrio e Polibio, Quartet), BI 317; Romanza e Preghiera (Rossini: Otello), BI 318; Cavatina: Nel furor delle tempeste (Bellini: Il Pirata), BI 319; Meco tu vieni (Bellini: La Straniera), BI 320; Tu vedrai la sventurata (Bellini: Il Pirata), BI 321; Duetto: Pietosa al padre (Bellini: Il Pirata), BI 322. Marco Misciagna (viola). MM. Released 2025
- Viola Solos – Live Recordings: Works by Johann Sebastian Bach, Heinrich Ignaz Franz Biber, Antonio Rolla, Giovanni Battista Polledro, Casimir Ney, Marco Anzoletti. MM. Released 2025
- Johann Paul von Westhoff: Six Partitas (Suites) for Solo Violin, Arranged for Viola by Marco Misciagna. Marco Misciagna (viola). MM. Released 2026
- Giovanni Bassano & Diego Ortiz: Ricercate and Recercadas (Arranged for Viola by Marco Misciagna). Marco Misciagna (viola). MM. Released 2026
- Giovanni Battista Vitali: Partite sopra diverse Sonate, Arranged for Solo Viola by Marco Misciagna. Marco Misciagna (viola). MM. Released 2026

=== EPs & Singles ===
- Bohemian Rhapsody, Arranged for Viola Solo by Marco Misciagna (Live). MM. Released 2024
- Tico-Tico no Fubá, Arranged for Viola Solo by Marco Misciagna (Live). MM. Released 2024
- Samba for Viola Solo (Live), music by Marco Misciagna. MM. Released 2024
- Heinrich Ignaz Franz Biber: Passacaglia for Solo Viola, Arranged by Marco Misciagna (Live). MM. Released 2024
- Johann Sebastian Bach: Sonata No.1, BWV 1001, Transcribed for Viola by Marco Misciagna (Live). MM. Released 2024
- Johann Sebastian Bach: Toccata & Fugue BWV 565, Arranged for Viola by Marco Misciagna (Live). MM. Released 2024
- Marco Anzoletti: Four Etudes for Viola Solo - Etudes No. 2 & 5 (1919) / Etudes No. 2 & 11 Op.125 (1929). Marco Misciagna (viola). MM. Released 2024
- Jiří Herold: Etudes for Viola (World Premiere Recording). Marco Misciagna (viola). MM. Released 2025
- Nicola Matteis: Alia Fantasia, Arranged for Solo Viola by Marco Misciagna. MM. Released 2026
- Monsieur de Sainte-Colombe: Les Pleurs, Arranged for Solo Viola by Marco Misciagna. MM. Released 2026
- Marin Marais: Les Voix Humaines, Arranged for Viola by Marco Misciagna. MM. Released 2026

== Original compositions and arrangements ==
=== Original compositions ===
- Three Flamenco Caprices for solo viola: El vito - Capricho Andaluz - Malagueña (also a version for solo violin)
- Introduction and Variations on the Theme Mer Hayrenik (Armenian National Anthem) for unaccompanied viola
- Morricone Film Suite for solo viola (Suite in 8 movements, homage to Ennio Morricone)
- Viola Blues for unaccompanied viola
- 6 Jazz Viola Preludes for solo viola (1-Ragtime, 2-Cafè Concerto, 3-Ragtime Boogie, 4-Ballade, 5-A Johann Sebastian Bach Joke, 6-Just After Midnight)
- Mosaic Fantasy for unaccompanied viola
- Samba for unaccompanied viola
- Star Wars Suite for unaccompanied viola (homage to John Williams)
- Jazz Caprices for unaccompanied viola
- 3 Pieces, Homage to Charlie Byrd for unaccompanied viola (1-Swing'59, 2-Blues for Felix, 3-Spanish Viola Blues)
- Fantasia on the Irish folk song "The last rose of summer" : for violin and piano / Romolo Pio Misciagna; (revision and violin cadence by Marco Misciagna)

=== Arrangements ===
- Isaac Albéniz: Asturias for viola solo (from: Suite española No. 1, for piano, op. 47) / Rumores de la Caleta for viola solo (from Recuerdos de viaje, for piano, op. 71)
- Francisco Tárrega: Tango, Recuerdos de la Alhambra, Capricho árabe for viola (original for guitar)
- Fernando Sor: Andante - Duo for One viola (from: 24 leçons progressives, for guitar, op. 31)
- Manuel De Falla: Danza del molinero from El sombrero de tres picos for viola
- Julio Salvador Sagreras: El colibrí (The Hummingbird) for viola
- Jacques Bittner: Suite for Viola
- Carl Philipp Emmanuel Bach: Pedal Excercition, for viola; Sonata in a minor, for viola
- Agustín Barrios Mangoré: La Catedral / Julia Florida (original for guitar) for viola solo; for cello solo
- Agustín Barrios Mangoré: Compositions Arranged for Viola Solo (Las Abejas, Canción de Cuna, Leyenda de España, Una Limosna por el Amor de Dios, Preludio, Capricho Español, Gavota al Estilo Antiguo, Villancico de Navidad)
- Georg Abraham Schneider: Variations Op. 44 (original for flute) for viola solo
- Francesco Paolo Supriani: 12 Toccatas (original for cello) for viola solo
- Tomaso Albinoni: Adagio, Arranged for Solo viola
- Johann Pachelbel: Canon, Arranged for Solo viola
- Niccolò Paganini: Sinfonia della Lodovisca (MS 98), Arranged for Solo viola

== Awards ==
His awards include:

- 2017 - Award “Arte, Sport e territorio” – Excellence from Puglia.
- 2019 - Messenger of Peace of Assisi Pax International
- 2019 - International Award "Fontane di Roma" (37th edition)
- 2019 - Elmo Prize "Stories of Ordinary Culture"
- 2019 - International Prize - Gold Medal "Maison des Artistes" (Sapienza University of Rome);
- 2019 - Constantinus Magnus International Award (Constantinian Nemagnic Order of St.Stephen);
- 2019 - “Vigna d’Argento” Award (Palazzo Montecitorio, Chamber of Deputies, Rome);
- 2019 - International Award "Duchess Lucrezia Borgia"
- 2019 - City of Naples International Award for Art, Culture and Fashion, 9th Edition Academy Oscar.
- 2019 - “Cicero Award” (Fondazione “Marco Tullio Cicerone”)
- 2019 - Vincenzo Crocitti Award (“VINCE International”, Rome)
- 2019 - Gold Histonium Award
- 2019 - Mona Lisa Award
- 2020 - Ubaldo Lay Award
- 2020 - The "Silver Chimera" 2020 award
- 2021 - National Award "Silver Eagle"
- 2024 - Gold Medal in the artistic sector of Norman Academy
- 2024 - Gold Medal (Best Classical) awarded to CD Album "Campagnoli: 41 Caprices for Viola Op.22, arranged for Viola & Piano by Carl Albert Tottman", Global Music Awards (La Jolla, California)
- 2024 - Gold Medal (Best Duo) awarded to CD Album "Campagnoli: 41 Caprices for Viola Op.22, arranged for Viola & Piano by Carl Albert Tottman", Global Music Awards (La Jolla, California)
- 2026 - International Award Nikolin Xhoja (25th edition)
- 2026 - Saint Bartolo Longo Award - 1st Edition (Sanctuary of Maria SS. di Cotrino in Latiano)

== Honors ==
- Silver Jubilee Merit Medal of the Sacred Military Constantinian Order of Saint George conferred on 16/04/2016;
- Silver Medal of Merit for the 300th anniversary of the Bolla Militantis Ecclesiae promulgated by Pope Clement XI” of the Sacred Military Constantinian Order of Saint George conferred on 27/05/2018;
- Gold Medal "In Commemoration of the 150th Anniversary of the National Opera of Ukraine" (May 2018)
- Honorary Citizenship of the City of Ayvalık – Turkey (February 2018)
- Honorary Citizenship of Guardia Piemontese – Italy (December 2019)
- Medal for Cooperation in Ukraine. No. 988 - 2 November 2020
- Medal of the Order of St. George Ukraine. No.1725 – 2 November 2020
- Medal of Merit for Peacekeepers - Porto Alegre/RS-Brazil, September 22, 2020
- Honorable Visitor of the City of Santiago de Cuba
- Order of Malta Refugee Aid Medal (Sovereign Military Order of Malta, 2021)
- Medal for the Ukraine Campaign of the Sovereign Military Order of Malta – Rome, 2023
- Bronze Medal of Merit "Il Tempo della Gentilezza" of the Italian Red Cross, Rome 2023
- Silver Cross Medal of Merit (2nd Class) of the Sammarinese Red Cross - Republic of San Marino, 2025
- Bronze Medal of Merit of the Albanian Red Cross – Republic of Albania, 2025
- "Humanitarian" Commemorative Medal of the Albanian Red Cross - Republic of Albania, Tirana 2025
- Honorary Soldier (Soldato ad Honorem) of the Mechanized Brigade "Pinerolo" – Bari, 2026
- Libertador General San Martín Recognition – Highest Honor awarded by the Senate of the Province of Corrientes, Argentina 2026
