= Bartolomeo Campagnoli =

Italian violinist and composer

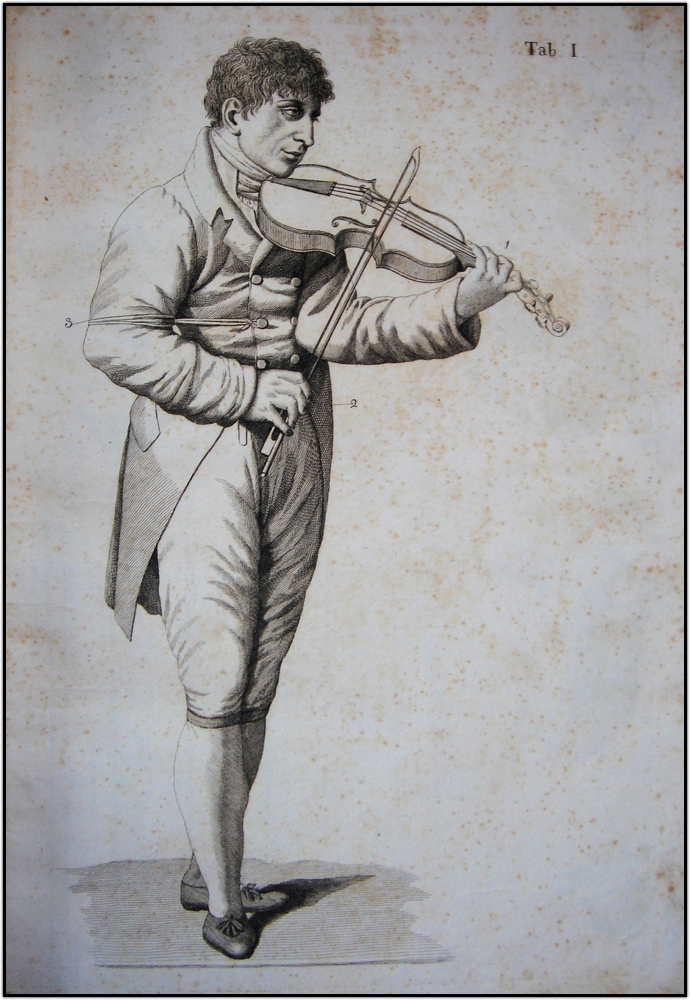
Nouvelle Méthode, illustration.

Bartolomeo Campagnoli (September 10, 1751 – November 6, 1827) was an Italian violinist and composer.

Campagnoli was a virtuoso violinist who toured Europe propagating the 18th Century Italian violin style. He also has a number of compositions to his name, notably:

- Divertissements for solo violin, which are highly regarded in music schools
- 41 Caprices for solo viola, frequently used by violists
- Nouvelle Méthode for the violin (1827).
- A number of Duos for flute and violin
- 30 Preludes for violin in all 24 keys

== Life ==
Bartolomeo was born in Cento, where his father was a trader. He studied the violin locally, firstly in Bologna, and then from 1763 in Modena with Paul Guastarobba, who had studied with the noted violinist Giuseppe Tartini. He returned home in 1766 and played in a local orchestra. In 1768 he studied further in Venice and Padua, where Tartini still lived.

He lived for a few years in Florence, where he studied with the violinist Pietro Nardini; this period was influential to his career. In Florence he also played in the orchestra of the Teatro della Pergola. In 1775 he went to Rome and played in the orchestra of the Teatro Argentina.

In 1776 he was appointed kapellmeister to the bishop of Freising in Bavaria. He toured northern Europe giving concerts in 1778 when he spent 3 months in Grodno and 3 months in Warsaw (Gerber 1812, 617). He obtained a post at the court of the Duke of Courland in Dresden in 1779. While retaining this post he undertook tours; he toured Sweden in 1783 where in Stockholm he was elected a member of the Royal Swedish Academy of Music; in 1784 toured European cities, mainly in Germany and Austria.

In 1797 he published Metodo per Violino, a treatise on violin playing; it can be regarded as demonstrating the style of a transitional period between the Baroque and Classical era.

He left the court of the Duke of Courland, and in 1797 he was appointed concertmaster of the Leipzig Gewandhaus Orchestra, a post he retained until 1818. He visited Paris in 1801, where he was impressed by the playing of the violinist Rodolphe Kreutzer.

During Campagnoli's time in Leipzig, the violinist and composer Louis Spohr, visiting the city where he was to give a concert, heard Campagnoli play a violin concerto by Rodolphe Kreutzer. He wrote in his diary, "His method, it is true, is of the old school; but his play is pure and finished."

His two daughters Albertina and Giannetta were singers, and in 1816 he toured Italy with them. He resigned from the Gewandhaus Orchestra to look after his daughters' careers; the family eventually settled in 1826 in Neustrelitz, where he died in 1827.

== Discography ==
In 2022 the Italian violist Marco Misciagna recorded the world premiere of Campagnoli's 41 Caprices op.22 in the version by Karl Albert Tottman. The Cd Album won two gold medals at the Global Music Awards (La Jolla, California).
