= 41 Caprices for Viola =

Set of caprices for viola by Bartolomeo Campagnoli

- by Bartolomeo Campagnoli
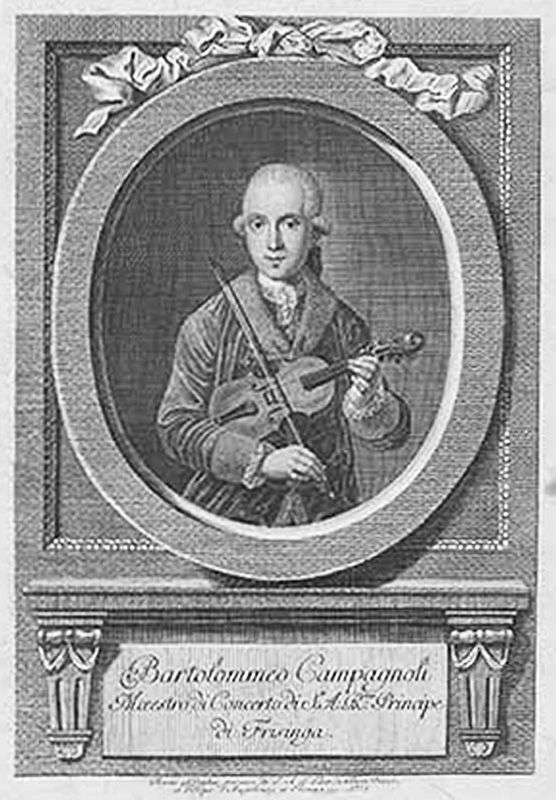
- Bartolomeo Campagnoli (1778)
- Opus: 22
- Genre: Caprices/Etudes
- Published: c. 1815
- Movements: 41
- Scoring: Solo viola

The 41 Caprices for Viola, Op. 22, is a collection of caprices for solo viola composed by Italian violinist and composer Bartolomeo Campagnoli. Published around 1815 by Breitkopf & Härtel, the work is considered a cornerstone of viola pedagogy and technique.

The caprices cover various technical aspects for both hands, including scales, arpeggios, double stops, and complex bowings.

Carl Albert Tottmann, a German musicologist, composed a piano accompaniment for all 41 caprices to facilitate concert performances. It was published in 1900 by Henry Litolff. This version was recorded by violist Marco Misciagna in 2022.

== See also ==
- Viola repertoire
