= Marco Anzoletti =

Italian violinist and composer (1867–1929)

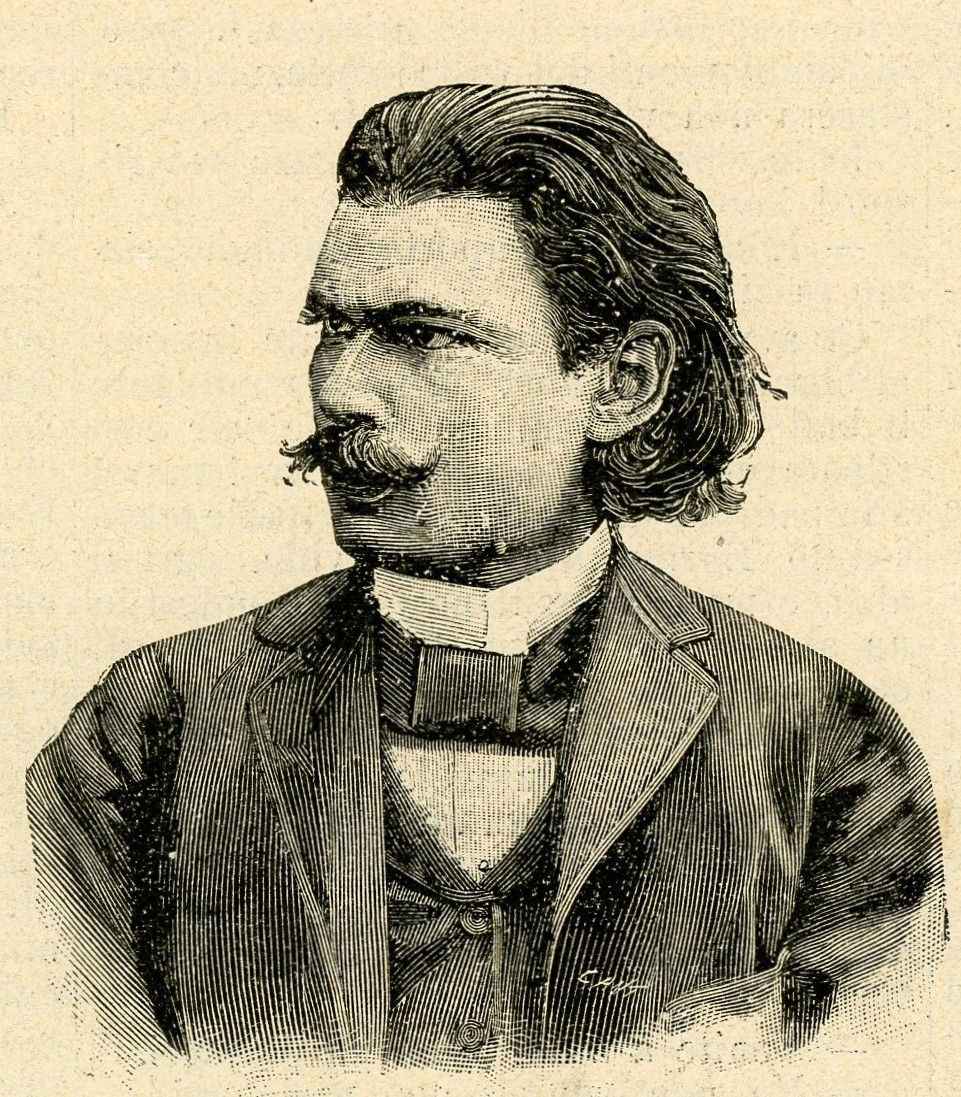
- Born: 4 June 1867; Trento, Italy
- Died: 23 January 1929 (aged 61); Mesiano, Italy
- Occupations: Composer; Violinist
- Works: List of compositions

Marco Anzoletti (Trento, 4 June 1867 – Mesiano, 23 January 1929) was an Italian violinist and composer. He wrote a vast amount of music and made significant contributions to musicological research.

== Biography ==
Marco Anzoletti was born in Trento on 4 June 1867, into a musical family. His father Luigi, a cellist, laid the foundation for their musical pursuits. Other family members were also musicians: Francesco, a pianist, organist, and composer; Giovanni, a violinist; Giuseppe, a violinist and composer; and Luisa, a poet and writer who collaborated with him on piano.

After receiving initial musical education at home, Anzoletti enrolled at the Milan Conservatory in 1879 to deepen his violin skills under Gerolamo de Angelis and study composition with Gaetano Coronaro. He graduated in 1885 and pursued further specialization in Vienna under Jakob Grün the following year. Anzoletti subsequently embarked on successful tours across Austria and Italy, culminating in his appointment to the violin faculty at the Milan Conservatory in 1889.

His career was dedicated to promoting chamber and symphonic music in Italy. Anzoletti's compositions include the acclaimed "24 Variations for violin and piano on a theme by Brahms" (1894), which garnered praise from the German master. Two years later Anzoletti won first prize with a Sonata in C minor for violin and piano in Milan. Anzoletti composed numerous works for the violin, with piano or organ accompaniment: sonatas, string trios and quartets, concertos, etc. He also composed important works for the organ, including the Fantasia Sacra for two organs, awarded in the competition for testing the two organs of the Milan Cathedral in 1909. Previously, in 1902, he had success in Vienna with his Cantata for choir and large orchestra, as well as for the Symphonic Poem: The Guest of the Earth, for large orchestra, later reduced for violin and piano and performed in Milan in 1913.

Anzoletti also composed 12 Studies for viola (Milan, 1919), The repertoire of the little violinist (Milan, 1920), Moto perpetuo sopra movements of scales (Milan, 1920) and 12 Studies for viola op. 125 (Milan, 1929).

Anzoletti wrote five operas for theatre, all with his own libretto, Militza o Serbia, a drama centered on the war between Montenegro and Turkey (1896–1897); The Races (1902); Faida, taken from Giosuè Carducci 's Faida di Comune (1910–1915); Belfagor, from the novella Belfagor arcidiavolo by Niccolò Machiavelli (1920); The end of Mozart, performed at the Teatro Lirico in Milan on 25 October 1898.

In addition to composition, Anzoletti dedicated himself to writing musical themes, including critical studies and biographies: Giuseppe Tartini, critical and biographical study (1891); On the events of the art and life of Wolfgang Amadeus Mozart, in La Rassegna Nazionale, XXI (1899); On the occasion of the centenary of D.Cimarosa, in La Rassegna Nazionale, XXIII (1901); Violin teaching in Italy, in La Rassegna Nazionale, XXXI (1901); also 43 musical sonnets (Milan, 1902); Mozart, scenes from intimate life in five paintings (Milan, 1906); Music – Seasons and metamorphoses, in La Rassegna Nazionale (1911).

He remained active until his death in his villa in Mesiano, Trento, on 23 January 1929.

In 2023 Italian violist Marco Misciagna performed the world premiere of Marco Anzoletti Concerto No.1 (1900) for Viola and Orchestra at Mahidol University (Salaya, Thailand) for the 48th International Viola Congress and in 2024 performed the world premiere of Concerto for Violin and Viola (1 soloist) in C major (1915).

== Bibliography ==
=== Publications ===
- Giuseppe Tartini: critical and biographical study (1891)
- On the Events of Art and the Life of Wolfgang Mozart, in La Rassegna nazionale, XXI (1899)
- On the occasion of the centenary of D. Cimarosa, in La Rassegna nazionale, XXIII (1901)
- The Teaching of the Violin in Italy, in La Rassegna nazionale, XXXI, (1901)
- Musical Sonnets (Milan, 1902)
- Mozart, Scenes from Intimate Life in Five Pictures (Milan, 1906)
- Music – Seasons and Metamorphoses, in La Rassegna nazionale, (1911)

== Compositions (partial) ==
=== Operas ===
- Militza or Serbia (1896–1897)
- La fine di Mozart (1898)
- Le Gare (1902)
- Faida (1910–1915)
- Belfagor (1920)

=== Music for solo viola ===
- 12 Studies for Viola (Milan, Ricordi, 1919)
- 12 Studies Op.125 for Viola (Milan, Ricordi, 1929)

→ These two volumes combine to create very difficult studies in all 24 major and minor keys.

=== Music for solo violin ===
- 5 Gran Capricci (1884)
- Sonata in stile antico (1908)
- 32 Preludi in tutte le tonalità (1909)
- Serenata in G major (1909)
- Fantasia – Caprice in A major (1913)
- Aria e Fuga Sopra il Nome di Bach (1913)
- "Labyrinthos" 104 Variations (1916)
- Aria e Fuga Sopra un Tema del Trillo del Diavolo (1916)
- 36 Preludes

=== Music for orchestra ===
==== Symphonies ====
- Symphony in C minor (1896)
- Symphony in D minor No. 1 (1897)
- Symphony in D minor No. 2
- Symphony in A minor (1897)
- Symphony in F minor (1897)
- Symphony in G minor (1898)
- Symphony in G major (1898)
- Symphony in C major (incomplete) (1898)
- Symphony in D major (incomplete) (1898)
- Symphony in F major (incomplete) (1898)
- Symphony in A major (1898)
- Symphony in One Movement in A minor (1899)
- Symphony – Overture in C major (1899)
- Symphony – Overture in B♭ major (1900)

==== Overture ====
- Overture in E♭ major (1901)
- Overture in F major (1901)
- Overture in D♭ major (1901)
- Overture in C minor (1901)
- Overture Eroicomica in C major
- Overture in G major

==== Concertos ====
- Concerto No. 1 in F minor for viola and orchestra (1900)
- Concerto No. 2 in B major for viola and orchestra (1915)
- Concerto in C major for violin/viola and orchestra (one soloist, two instruments – 1915)
- Concerto No. 1 in G major for violin and orchestra (1896)
- Concerto No. 1 in A major for violin and orchestra (1899)
- Concerto in F major for violin and orchestra (1899)
- Concerto in F♯ minor for violin and orchestra (1903)
- Concerto in A minor for violin and orchestra (1912)
- Concerto in G minor for violin and orchestra (1912)
- Concerto in C major for violin and orchestra (1920)
- Concerto No. 2 in G major for violin and orchestra (1920)
- Concerto in F♯ major for violin and orchestra (1920)
- Concerto in E minor for violin and orchestra (1920)
- Concerto No. 2 in A major for violin and orchestra (1921)
- Concerto in B major for violin and orchestra (1921)
- Concerto in E major for violin and orchestra (1921)
- Concerto in B bemolle major for violin and orchestra (1921)
- Concerto in D major for violin and orchestra

=== Chamber music ===
- Quartet No. 1 in C major (1906)
- Quartet in A minor (1907)
- Quartet in A major (1907)
- Quartet in D minor (1908)
- Quartet in C minor (1908)
- Quartet No. 2 in C major (1908)
- Quartet in G major (1909)
- Quartet in D major (1909)
- Quartet in E♭ minor (1911)
- Quartet in F♯ major (1911)
- Quartet in F♯ minor (1911)
- Sextet in G major for 2 violins, 2 violas and 2 cellos (1903)
- Sextet II in E bemolle major for 2 violins, 2 violas and 2 cellos (1903)
- Quintet in G major for 2 violins, 2 violas and cello (1903)
- Quintet in C minor for 2 violins, 2 violas and cello (1903)
- Quartet No. 1 in E♭ major for violin, viola, cello and pianoforte (1892)
- Quartet in C major for violin, viola, cello and piano (1892)
- Quintet No. 1 in E♭ major for 2 violins, viola, cello and piano (incomplete) (1893)
- Sextet II in Do minore per due violini, due viole, violoncello e pianoforte (1893)
- Trio No. 2 in G major for violin, cello and piano (1893)
- Trio No. 1 in G minor for violin, cello and piano (1893)
- Trio No. 1 in C minor for violin, cello and piano (1895)

=== Didactic music ===
- The Repertoire of the Little Violinist (Milan, 1920)
- Moto Perpetuo on Scale Movements (Milan, 1920)

== Discography ==
- Marco Anzoletti: Four Etudes for Viola Solo – Etudes No. 2 & 5 (1919) / Etudes No. 2 & 11 Op.125 (1929) – Marco Misciagna, viola – MM11, 2024
- Marco Anzoletti: Vite in Musica (RaiPlay Sound)
- Marco Anzoletti: Golden Nothingness, Complete Unpublished Art Songs for Soprano and Piano (Da Vinci Classics, 2024)
