= Francesco Paolo Supriani =

- Born: 11 July 1678; Conversano, Kingdom of Naples
- Died: 28 August 1753 (aged 75); Naples, Kingdom of Naples
- Citizenship: Italian
- Occupations: cellist, composer
- Notable work: 12 Toccatas for Cello

Francesco Paolo Tomaso Supriani (Conversano, 11 July 1678 – Naples, 28 August 1753) was an Italian cellist and composer of the Neapolitan school.

== Biography ==
He was a student of Conservatorio della Pietà dei Turchini from 1693, where he became a cello virtuoso.

He was the author of a manuscript didactic collection of toccatas for the instrument, with an explanatory introduction, entitled: Principij da imparare à suonare il violoncello e con 12 Toccate à solo, found and published by the musicologist and cellist Luigi Silva (1903–1961). A copy of the manuscript is kept in the Biblioteca Conservatorio San Pietro a Majella, Naples. In this work Supriani already uses the fifth position, as well as the bass and tenor clefs. As a virtuoso cellist, he helped the cello to emerge from its traditional rank of continuo and reach the elevated status of a solo instrument.

Supriani is considered one of the teachers of Francesco Alborea, commonly known as "Franciscello".

== Compositions ==
Principij da imparare à suonare il violoncello e con 12 Toccate à solo (1720)

12 Toccatas for cello solo:

- Toccata prima in G major
- Toccata seconda in A minor
- Toccata terza in B flat major
- Toccata quarta in C major
- Toccata quinta
- Toccata sesta
- Toccata settima
- Toccata ottava in G minor
- Toccata nona in A major
- Toccata decima in D minor
- Toccata undicesima in A minor
- Toccata dodicesima in F minor

== Discography ==
- La voce del violoncello opere per violoncello dei principali compositori violoncellisti italiani - (2012, Passacaille Records) OCLC 848901855
- Boccherini's Dreams : Toccate I, IV, X e XI – Mime Yamahiro Brinkmann, violoncello (gennaio/febbraio 2021, Arcantus) — con due sonate di Boccherini e brani di Pasquini, Cabezon e Storace.
- Supriani: 12 Toccatas for Cello, Transcribed for Viola by Marco Misciagna - Marco Misciagna, viola (2024, MM - MM03)
