= Roxy Theatre (New York City) =

Former movie theater in Manhattan, New York

The Roxy Theatre
- The Roxy Theatre, 1927 postcard (the Taft Hotel is on the left)
- Interactive map of The Roxy Theatre
- Address: 153 West 50th Street; New York City; United States
- Coordinates: 40.760844°N 73.981783°W
- Owner: Fox Theatres; National Theaters; Rockefeller Center
- Operator: Roxy Theatre Corp.
- Capacity: 5,920 (in 1927)
- Type: Movie palace

Construction
- Opened: March 11, 1927
- Closed: March 29, 1960
- Demolished: 1960
- Years active: 1927–1960
- Architect: Walter W. Ahlschlager

The Roxy Theatre was a 5,920 (Note: The original advertised capacity of 6,214 was never actually true. The theater's blue prints, as published in American Theatres of Today (1927), reveal the true seating capacity as 5,920.)-seat movie palace at 153 West 50th Street between 6th and 7th Avenues, just off Times Square in New York City. It was the largest movie theater ever built at the time of its construction in 1927. It opened on March 11, 1927, with the silent film The Love of Sunya starring Gloria Swanson. It was a leading Broadway film showcase through the 1950s and also noted for its lavish stage shows. It closed and was demolished in 1960.

== Early history ==
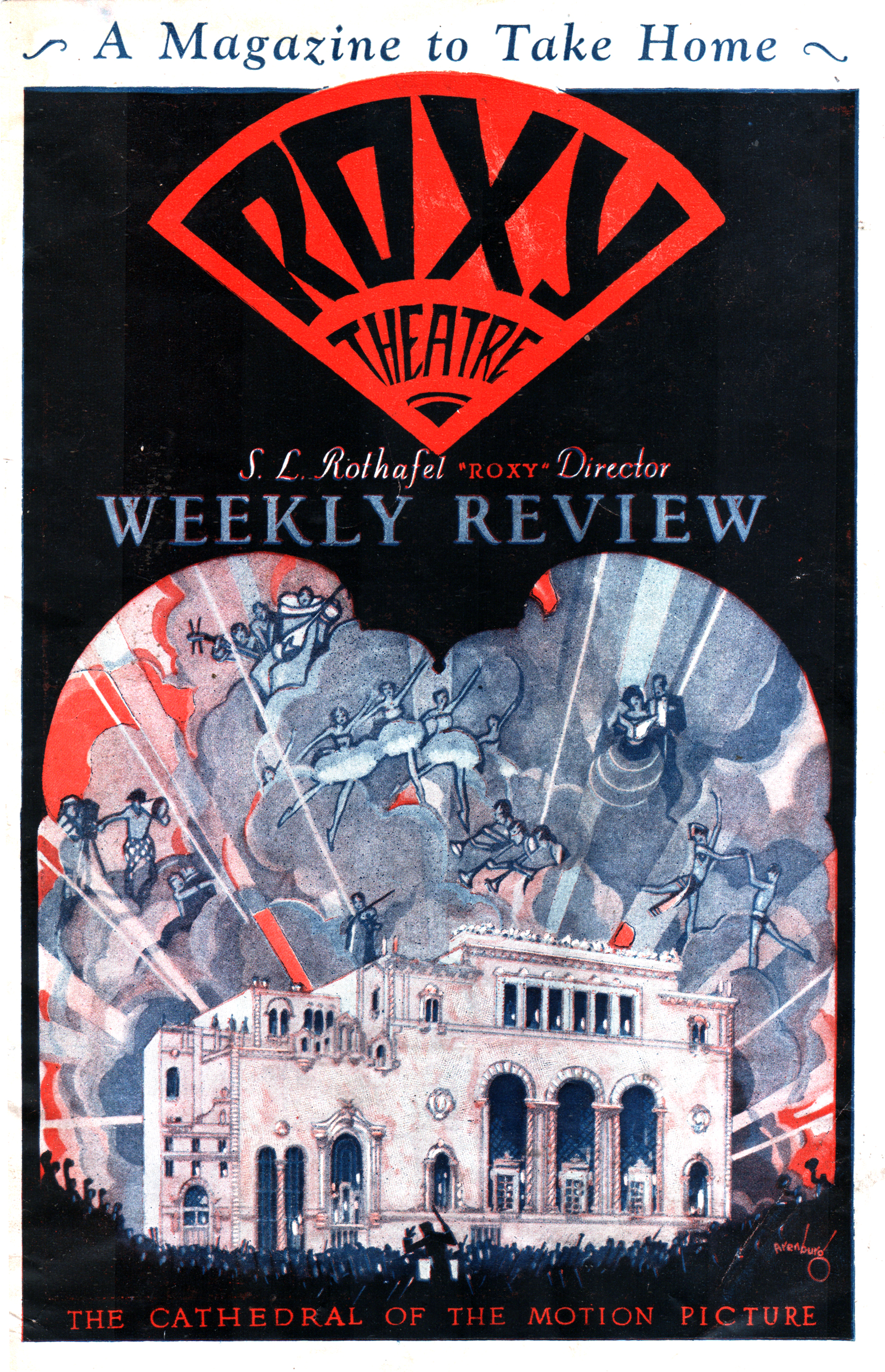
Roxy Theatre Weekly Review, March 10, 1928

The theater was conceived by film producer Herbert Lubin in mid-1925 as the world's largest and finest movie palace. To realize his dream, Lubin brought in the successful and innovative theater operator Samuel L. Rothafel, aka "Roxy", enticing him with a large salary, a percentage of the profits and stock options, and even offering to name the theatre after him. It was intended as the first of six Roxy Theatres in the New York area.

Roxy was determined to make the theater the summit of his career, realizing all of his theatrical design and production ideas. He worked with Chicago architect Walter W. Ahlschlager and decorator Harold Rambusch of Rambusch Decorating Company on every aspect of its design and furnishing.

Roxy's lavish ideas and many changes ran up costs dramatically. A week before the theater opened, Lubin, $2.5 million over budget and near bankruptcy, sold his controlling interest to movie mogul and theater owner William Fox for $5 million. The theater's final cost was $12 million.

With Lubin's exit, Roxy's dreams of his own theater circuit also ended. Only one other of the projected Roxy chain was built: the Roxy Midway Theatre on Broadway, on Manhattan's Upper West Side, also designed by Ahlschlager. It was nearly completed when it was sold to Warner Bros., who opened it as Warner's Beacon in 1929.

== Design and innovation ==
Known as the "Cathedral of the Motion Picture", the Roxy's design by Ahlschlager featured a soaring golden, Spanish-inspired auditorium. Its main lobby was a large columned rotunda called the Grand Foyer, which featured "the world's largest oval rug", manufactured by Mohawk Carpets in Amsterdam, New York, and its own separate pipe organ on the mezzanine. Off the rotunda was a long entrance lobby that led through the adjacent Manger Hotel to the theater's main entrance at the corner of Seventh Avenue and W. 50th Street. The hotel (later called the Taft Hotel) was built at the same time as the theater.

Ahlschlager succeeded in creating an efficient plan for the Roxy's irregular plot of land, utilizing every bit of space by designing a diagonal auditorium with the stage in one corner of the lot. It maximized the auditorium's size and seating capacity but compromised the function of its triangular stage. The Roxy's stage, while very wide, was not very deep and had limited off-stage space.

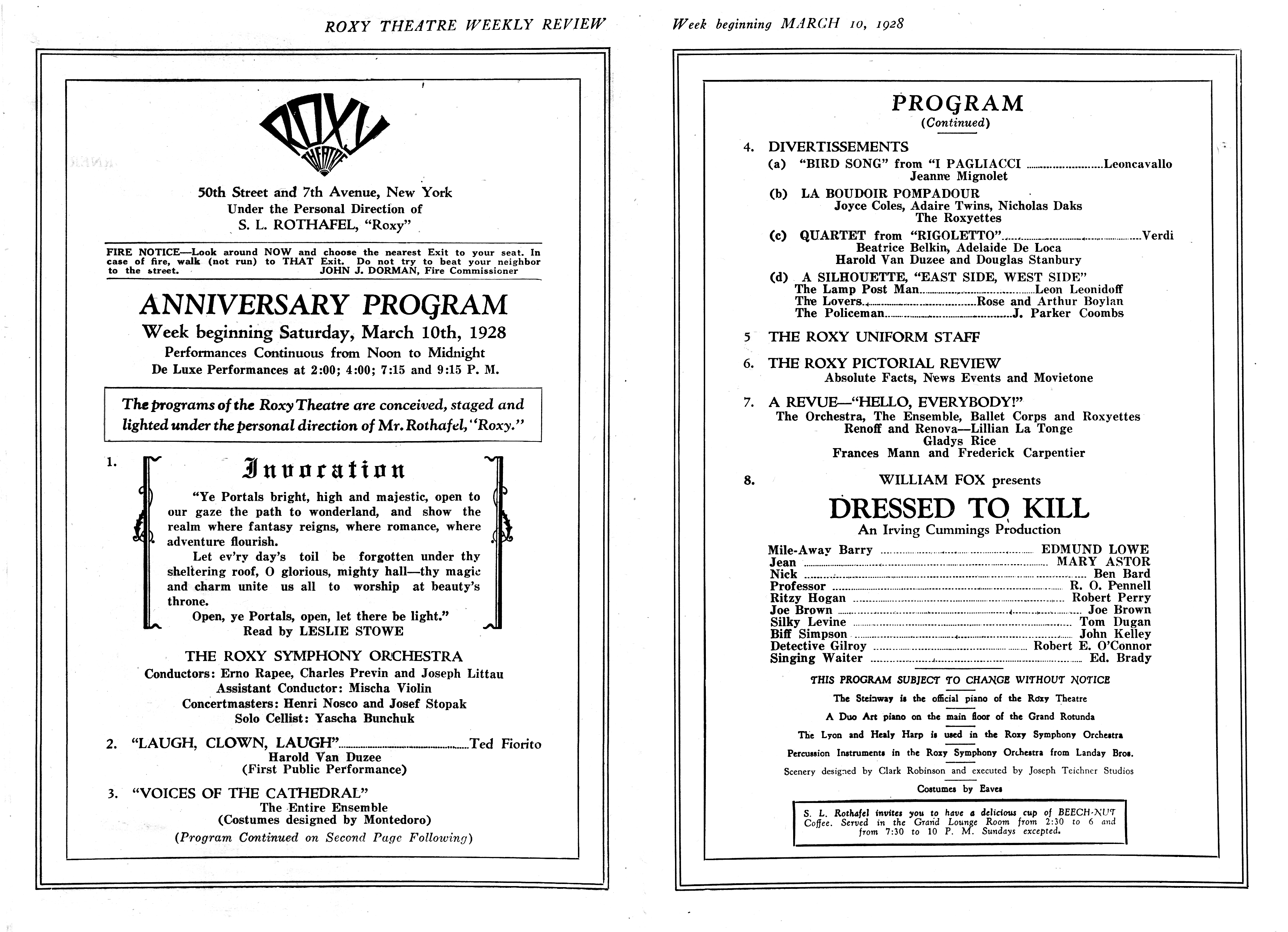
Program for the week of the first anniversary of the Roxy Theatre, March 10–16, 1928

Despite this limitation, the theater boasted lavish support facilities including two stories of private dressing rooms, three floors of chorus dressing rooms, huge rehearsal rooms, a costume department, staff dry-cleaning and laundry rooms, a barber shop and hairdresser, a dining room, a completely equipped infirmary, and a menagerie for show animals. There were also myriad offices, a private 100-seat screening room, and massive machine rooms for the electrical, ventilation and heating machinery. The theater's large staff also enjoyed a cafeteria, gymnasium, billiard room, nap room, library and showers.

The theater's stage innovations included a rising orchestra pit which could accommodate 110 musicians, and a three-console Kimball theater pipe organ. The film projection booth was recessed into the front of the balcony to prevent film distortion caused by the usual angled projection from the top rear wall of a theater. This enabled the Roxy to have the sharpest film image for its time.

Courteous service to patrons was a key part of the Roxy formula. The theater's uniformed corps of male ushers were known for their courtesy, efficiency, and military bearing. They underwent rigorous training and daily inspections and drills, overseen by a retired Marine officer. Their crisp attire was favorably mentioned by Cole Porter in a stanza of the song "You're the Top" in 1932.

The Roxy presented major Hollywood films in programs that also included a 110-member symphony orchestra (the world's largest permanent orchestra at that time), a solo theater pipe organist, a male chorus, a ballet company, and a famous line of female precision dancers, the "Roxyettes". Elaborate stage spectacles were created each week to accompany the feature film, all under Rothafel's supervision.

The theater's orchestra and performers were also featured in an NBC Radio program with Roxy himself as host. The Roxy Hour was broadcast live weekly from the theater's own radio studio. As a result, Roxy's theater was known to radio listeners nationwide.

== The Roxy after Roxy ==
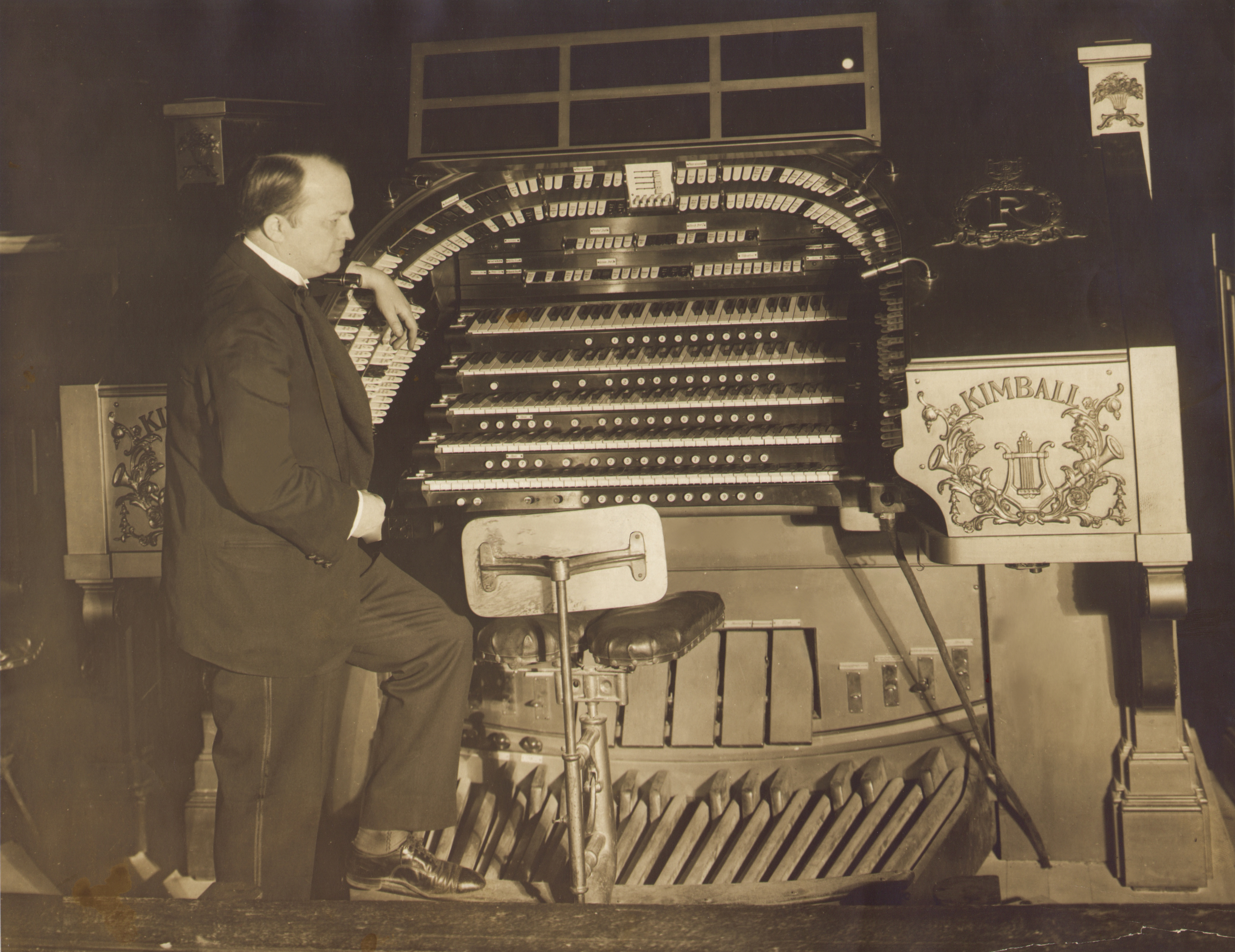
Organist Dezso d'Antalffy with the Kimball organ at the Roxy Theatre

In spite of the theater's fame and success, the Wall Street crash of 1929 created financial problems for its majority owner, the Fox Film Corporation. This destabilized the Roxy's complex operations, and it was often saddled with inferior films. In 1932, Rothafel left the theater named for him for Rockefeller Center, where he opened the new Radio City Music Hall and RKO Roxy theaters. Most of the Roxy's performers and artistic staff moved to the Music Hall with him, including producer Leon Leonidoff, choreographer Russell Markert, and conductor Erno Rapee. The Roxyettes went on to greater fame at the Music Hall, where they became the Rockettes in 1935 (and where their successors continue performing today). The RKO Roxy soon changed its name to the Center Theatre when the owners of the original Roxy sued Rockefeller Center for rights to the Roxy name.

After Rothafel's departure, the Roxy Theatre never quite regained its former glory, but remained a leading New York showcase for film and stage variety shows. In 1942, A. J. Balaban, co-founder of the Balaban & Katz theater chain, began nearly a decade as its executive director. He came out of retirement to run the theater at the urging of Spyros Skouras, the head of the Roxy's parent company, National Theatres, as well as 20th Century-Fox Studios. Balaban restored the theater to profitability with access to first-run Fox films, as well as the production and presentation of first-class live shows. Among his innovations were building an ice rink on the Roxy stage, and engaging many of the era's noted performers, such as Josephine Baker, the Nicholas Brothers, Carmen Cavallaro, Victor Borge, Emmett Kelly and The Harmonicats. Even classical ballet dancers, such as Leonide Massine, performed there. Balaban invited the New York Philharmonic to the Roxy along with soprano Eileen Farrell for a two-week engagement in September 1950. Appearing for the first time as the main attraction at a movie palace, the orchestra played an abbreviated concert program four times a day between showings of the feature film, The Black Rose.

The Roxy's stage was rebuilt twice, in 1948 and 1952, to add the ice surface for skating shows. During the latter refurbishing, the stage was extended into the house over the orchestra pit, and colored neon was embedded in the ice. Ice shows were presented, along with the feature film, on and off through the 1950s. In January 1956, skating star Sonja Henie brought her revue to the Roxy in her final New York appearance.

Widescreen CinemaScope was introduced at the Roxy with the world premiere in 1953 of 20th Century-Fox's film The Robe. The Roxy had also introduced the original 70mm widescreen format "Fox Grandeur" in 1930 with the premiere of Fox Films' Happy Days. Due to the Great Depression, however, the Roxy was one of only two theaters (with Grauman's Chinese) equipped for 70mm Grandeur, and it never caught on. Another widescreen format, the three-projector Cinemiracle, also debuted at the Roxy on a curved 110-foot screen with the 1958 film Windjammer which resulted in the capacity being reduced to 2,710. Part of the proscenium and side walls were removed to accommodate the huge Cinemiracle screen, and much of the rest of the auditorium was covered in heavy drapes.

From 1955 on, the theater's managing director was Roxy Rothafel's son, Robert C. Rothafel. By this time the theater's appearance had been altered considerably from its original lavish 1920s design. The big orchestra pit was mostly covered by the stage extension, and the organ consoles were removed. The elegant lobby areas, however, remained largely intact.

In 1956, the theater was acquired by the Rockefeller family for $6.1 million and leased back to National Theatres.

In 1958, Rothafel and an independent syndicate took over management of the theater from National Theatres. Following the end of Windjammer's run, the theater's capacity was increased.

One of the Roxy's last big combined shows was in 1959, with the feature film This Earth Is Mine starring Rock Hudson and Jean Simmons, followed by The Big Circus starring Victor Mature. On the stage were Gretchen Wyler, The Blackburn Twins, Jerry Collins, and The Roxy Orchestra.

== Closure ==
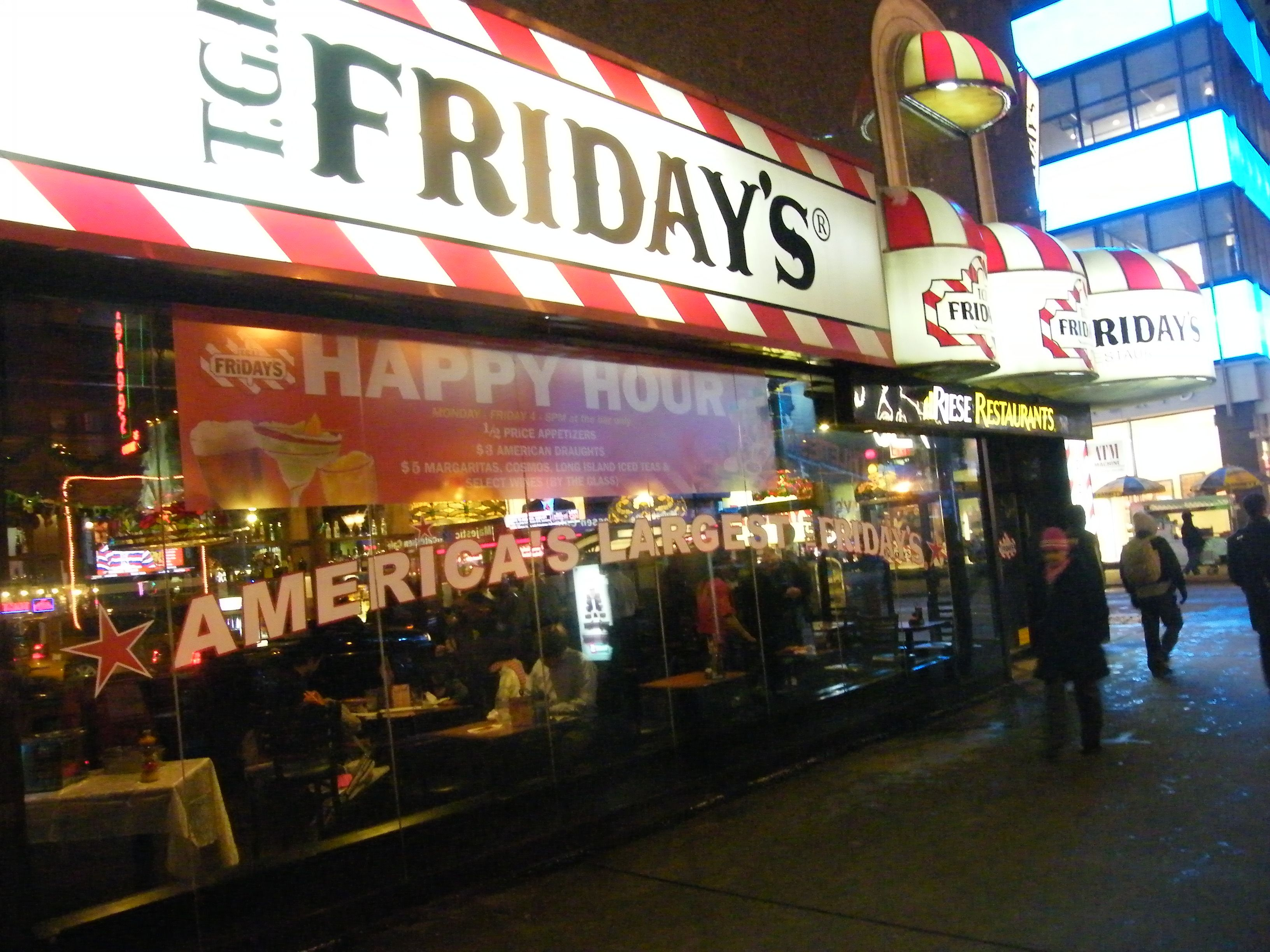
A TGI Friday's restaurant occupied the former site of the Roxy Theatre's entrance lobby until it closed due to the COVID-19 pandemic

The Roxy closed on March 29, 1960. The final movie was The Wind Cannot Read, a British film with Dirk Bogarde, which opened March 9.

The Roxy was acquired by Rockefeller Center in 1956, then sold to developer William Zeckendorf. It was Initially purchased to obtain air rights for the Time-Life Building, built to its east. Zeckendorf had it demolished for an expansion of the Taft Hotel, and for an office building that is now connected to the Time-Life building. Eliot Elisofon's photograph of Gloria Swanson amidst the theater's ruins appeared in the November 7, 1960 issue of LIFE. The theater can briefly be seen from the air, during its demolition, in the prologue of the film West Side Story, across 7th Avenue from the back of the Winter Garden Theatre.

== Legacy ==
The spectacular stage and screen programming ideas of the Roxy's founder continued at Radio City Music Hall into the 1970s. Its lavish Christmas stage show, created in 1933 by the Roxy's former producer and choreographer, Leon Leonidoff and Russell Markert, continues to this day as the Radio City Christmas Spectacular. The Music Hall itself was saved from demolition by a consortium of preservation and commercial interests in 1979, and remains one of New York's entertainment landmarks. Its restored interior includes the lavish Art Deco offices created for "Roxy" Rothafel, preserved as a tribute to the visionary showman.
