= Rudolf Schirmer =

German ophthalmologist (1831–1896)

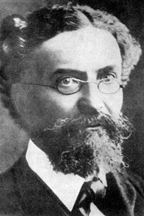
Rudolf Schirmer.

Rudolf Schirmer (10 March 1831, Greifswald – 27 January 1896) was a German ophthalmologist from Greifswald.

He initially studied medicine at the University of Greifswald, then furthered his studies at Göttingen, Berlin, Paris and Vienna. Later he returned to Greifswald, where he was habilitated for ophthalmology in 1860. In 1873 he attained the chair of ophthalmology, a position he held until his retirement in 1893. In 1885, he succeeded philosopher Wilhelm Schuppe as university rector at Greifswald.

Schirmer is remembered for establishing ophthalmology as an independent discipline at Greifswald, as well as his research involving the anomalies of refraction and accommodation of the eye. Also he performed extensive studies of diseases involving the lacrimal apparatus. The term "Schirmer's syndrome" is employed to indicate the association of hydrophthalmia (early glaucoma) and Sturge–Weber syndrome.

His son, Otto Schirmer (1864–1918) was also a professor of ophthalmology at Greifswald.

== Publications ==
- Ein Fall von Telangiektasia. Albrecht von Graefe's Archiv für Ophtalmologie, 1860, 7: 119–121. - A case of telangiectasia.
- Die Lehre von den Refractions- und Accomodationsstörungen des Auges. Berlin, 1866. Die Krankheiten der Thränenorgane. Graefe-Saemisch, Handbuch der Augenheilkunde. - The theory of refraction and accommodation disorders of the eye.
