= Émile Poilleux =

French violinist and writer (1866–1924)

- Born: 28 July 1866; 1st arrondissement of Paris
- Died: 27 October 1924 (aged 58); 17th arrondissement of Paris
- Citizenship: French
- Education: Conservatoire de Paris
- Occupations: violinist, writer
- Notable work: 20 Études chantantes et caractéristiques for violin

Émile Poilleux (28 July 1866 – 27 October 1924) was a French violinist, violin teacher and writer.

== Biography ==
Émile Poilleux was born in Paris on 28 July 1866. After studying at the Conservatoire de Paris, Poilleux joined the Nancy Symphony Orchestra and then that of Strasbourg.

He published several works on the violin and music, and was also the author of numerous scores.

Poilleux was a violin teacher at the Galin-Paris-Chevé School. He died in the 17th arrondissement of Paris on 27 October 1924.

== Compositions ==
- Vingt études chantantes et caractéristiques pour violon par Émile Poilleux (BnF 39600217x).
- Méthode de violon élémentaire et progressive en notation chiffrée, par Émile Poilleux et École Galin-Paris-Chevé (BnF 41674534r).

== Discography ==
In 2024 the Italian violist Marco Misciagna recorded the world premiere of Poilleux's 20 Études chantantes et caractéristiques for violin, transcribed for viola by himself.

== Sources ==
- "Bibliographie de la France: Compositions Musicale". Journal Général De L'imprimerie Et De La Librairie (in French). Paris: Cercle de l'imprimerie, de la librairie et de la papeterie. 4 December 1897. p. 826.
- Bibliothèque nationale (France) (1892). Bulletin Mensuel des Récentes Publications Francaises (in French). p. 33..
- The Strad. 1909. p. 253.
- 6 solos faciles, op. 41, pour violon et piano:1er solo en ré majeur, Numéro 1 par Hubert Léonard, Guy Comentale.
