= Jacques Poilleux =

French doctor and academic (1937 or 1938 – 2025)

- Born: 1937 or 1938; Paris, France
- Died: 10 January 2025 (aged 87)
- Occupations: Doctor; Academic

Jacques Poilleux (1937 or 1938 – 10 January 2025) was a French doctor, surgeon, and academic. In 2009, he served as president of the Académie nationale de chirurgie.

== Biography ==
Born in Paris, Poilleux was the son of writer and surgeon Félix Poilleux. He chose the same career path as his father, serving as a longtime member of the Académie nationale de chirurgie. In 2009, he launched a campaign against robots replacing humans as surgeons. He also served on the editorial board of e-Mémoires, the newsletter of the Académie. A member of Rotary International, he participated in the Rotary Club of Deauville.

Poilleux died on 10 January 2025, at the age of 87.

== Bibliography ==
- Chirurgie des artères digestives (with Marc Hivet and Bertrand Lagadec, 1970)
