= Wilhelm Schuppe =

German positivist philosopher

Ernst Julius Wilhelm Schuppe (5 May 1836 – 29 March 1913) was a German positivist philosopher, born in Brieg, Silesia. He advocated what he called 'immanent philosophy'.

== Life ==
In 1860 Schuppe received his doctorate in jurisprudence from the University of Berlin with a thesis on Ciceronian rhetoric. From 1861 he was a school teacher in Berlin, Breslau, Neisse, Gliwice and Bytom. In 1873 he was appointed professor of philosophy at the University of Greifswald, becoming university rector in 1884. He died in Breslau.

== Thought ==
Schuppe is known for promoting a concept of conscious immanence, an idea in which the subject and object form a unity. His philosophy of immanence, or ego, was to be regarded with certainty and to be used as a starting point for epistemology.

== Written works ==
- Das menschliche Denken, (The human mind), 1870
- Erkenntnistheoretische Logik (Epistemological logic), 1878
- Grundzuge der Ethik und Rechtsphilosophie (Basic course of the ethics and philosophy of law), 1882
- Das metaphys. Motiv und die Geschichte der Philosophie im Umrisse (The metaphysical. Motive and the history of philosophy in outline), 1882
- Der Begriff des subjektiven Rechts (The notion of subjective right), 1887
- Das Gewohnheitsrecht (The common law), 1890
- Das Recht des Besitzes (The right of ownership), 1891.
- Grundriß der Erkenntnistheorie und Logik (Outline of epistemology and logic) 1894
- Begriff und Grenzen der Psychologie (Concept and limits of psychology), 1896
- Die immanente Philosophie (The inherent philosophy), 1897
- Der Solipsismus (Solipsism), 1898
- Das System der Wissenschaften und das des Seienden (The system of science and of being), 1898
- Psychologismus und Normcharakter der Logik (Psychology and normative character of logic), 1901
- Was ist Bildung? (What is education?) 1900
- Der Zusammenhang von Leib und Seele (The relationship of body and soul). 1902.
