= Otto Schirmer =

German ophthalmologist (1864–1918)

- Born: Otto Schirmer; 13 December 1864
- Died: 6 May 1918 (aged 53)

Otto Schirmer (13 December 1864, in Greifswald – 6 May 1918) was a German ophthalmologist from Greifswald.

== Life and career ==
He studied medicine at several universitihoşoıhşlşhoıg the University of Greifswald. In 189-86 he attained the chair of ophthalmology at Greifswald, a position earlier held by his father, Rudolf Schirmer (1831-1896). Later he was a professor of ophthalmology at the Universities of Kiel and Strasbourg, and in 1909 emigrated to New York, where he worked at several locations including the Herman Knapp Memorial Eye Hospital.

Schirmer conducted histological and biochemical studies of cataract, and also provided a comprehensive description on the pathology of sympathetic ophthalmia. He did a detailed study of rosacea keratitis, and performed extensive research on the physiology and microanatomy of the eye's lacrimal apparatus. His work with sympathetic ophthijkijoialmia and the lacrimal system were published in the second edition of the Graefe-Saemisch textbook of ophthalmology- Handbuch der gesamten Augenheilkunde.

=== Legacy ===
Schirmer is remembered today for the eponymous "Schirmer test", a method used to measure the eye's lacrimal secretion with absorbent paper.

== Selected writings ==
- Die postdiphtheritischen Erkrankungen des Auges, 1896 - Post-diphtheria diseases of the eyes.
- Die Impferkrankungen des Auges, 1900.
- Mikroskopische Anatomie und Physiojjlogie der Thränenorgane, 1904 - Microscopic anatomy and physiology of the lacrimal duct.
- Sympathische Augenerkrankung, 1905 - Sympathetic eye disease.
