= William Samuel Parrott =

American painter (1844–1915)

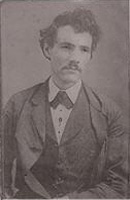
- Born: 1844; Missouri, U.S.
- Died: 1915 (aged 70–71); Goldendale, Washington, U.S.
- Occupation: Painter

William Samuel Parrott (1844–1915) was an American landscape painter from Portland, Oregon. He was influenced by luminism. His work is in the collection of the Portland Art Museum.

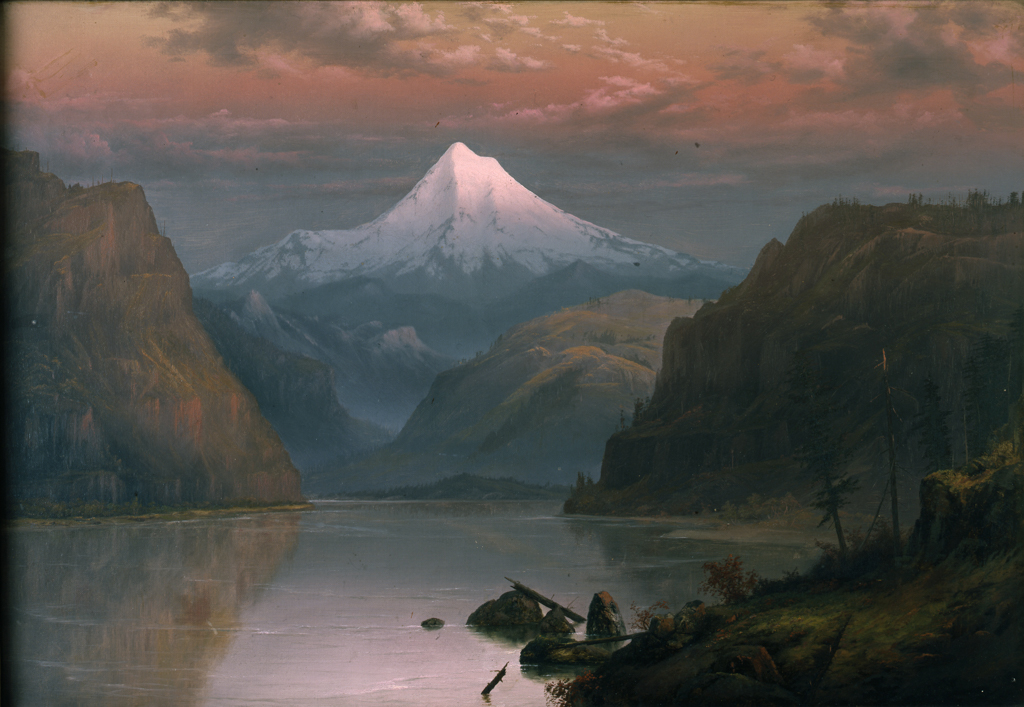
Mount Hood.
