= Love Conquers All =

Love conquers all (Latin: omnia vincit amor or amor vincit omnia) may refer to:

== Latin form ==
- Omnia vincit amor, a Latin phrase from Eclogue X by Virgil
- Amor Vincit Omnia (Caravaggio), a 1601–1602 painting by Caravaggio
- Amor Vincit Omnia, an 1895 painting by Jean Gouweloos
- Amor Vincit Omnia, a 2009 album by Draco Rosa
- Amor Vincit Omnia (album), a 2009 album by Pure Reason Revolution
- Amor Vincit Omnia, the series finale of Netflix Sci-Fi series Sense8

== English form ==
- Love Conquers All, a novel by Fred Saberhagen
- Love Conquers All, a 1922 compilation by Robert Benchley
- Love Conquers All (1934 film), a 1934 German film
- Love Conquers All (2006 film), a 2006 Malaysian film by Tan Chui Mui
- Love Conquers All, the name of a specific edit of Terry Gilliam's 1985 film Brazil
- Love Conquers All (album), a 1982 album by Michael Wycoff
- "Love Will Conquer All", a 1986 song by Lionel Richie
- "Love Conquers All" (ABC song), 1991
- "Love Conquers All", a song by Deep Purple from their 1990 album Slaves and Masters
- "Love Conquers All", a song by Yes from their 1991 album Yesyears
- Love Conquers All, a 1992 album by Radio Werewolf

== See also ==
- Love Wins (disambiguation)
- Love Conquers Al (disambiguation)
