= Love Conquers Al =

Love Conquers Al may refer to:

- "Love Conquers Al" (Cold Case), a 2003 television episode
- "Love Conquers Al" (Married... with Children), a 1995 television episode

== See also ==
- Love Conquers All (disambiguation)
