= Jean Gouweloos =

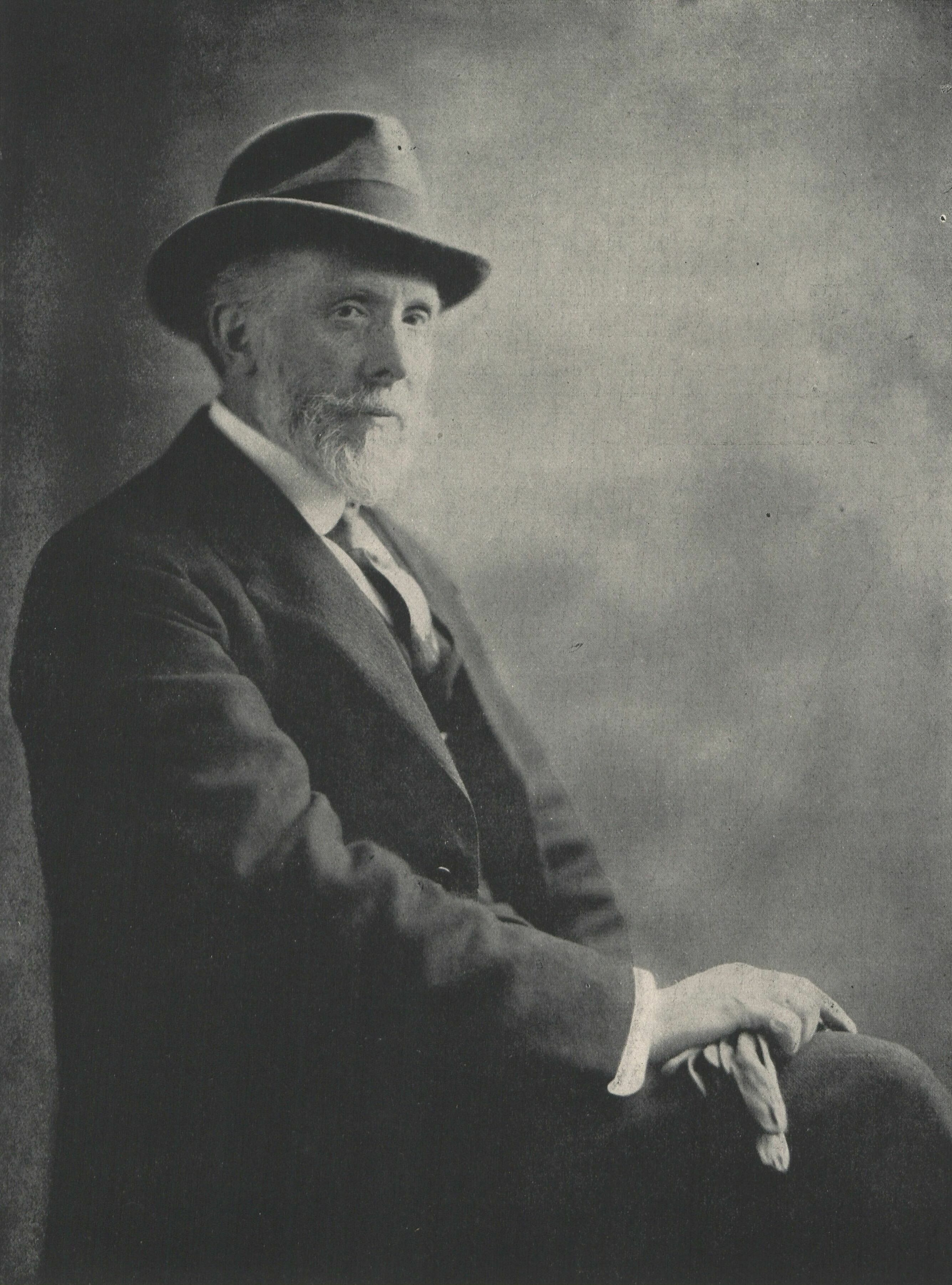
- Photographic portrait published in L'Art belge, 31 May 1921
- Born: Jean Léon Henri Gouweloos ca. 1865; Brussels, Belgium
- Died: ca. 1943; Brussels, Belgium
- Occupations: Painter, draughtsman, affichiste, and lithographer

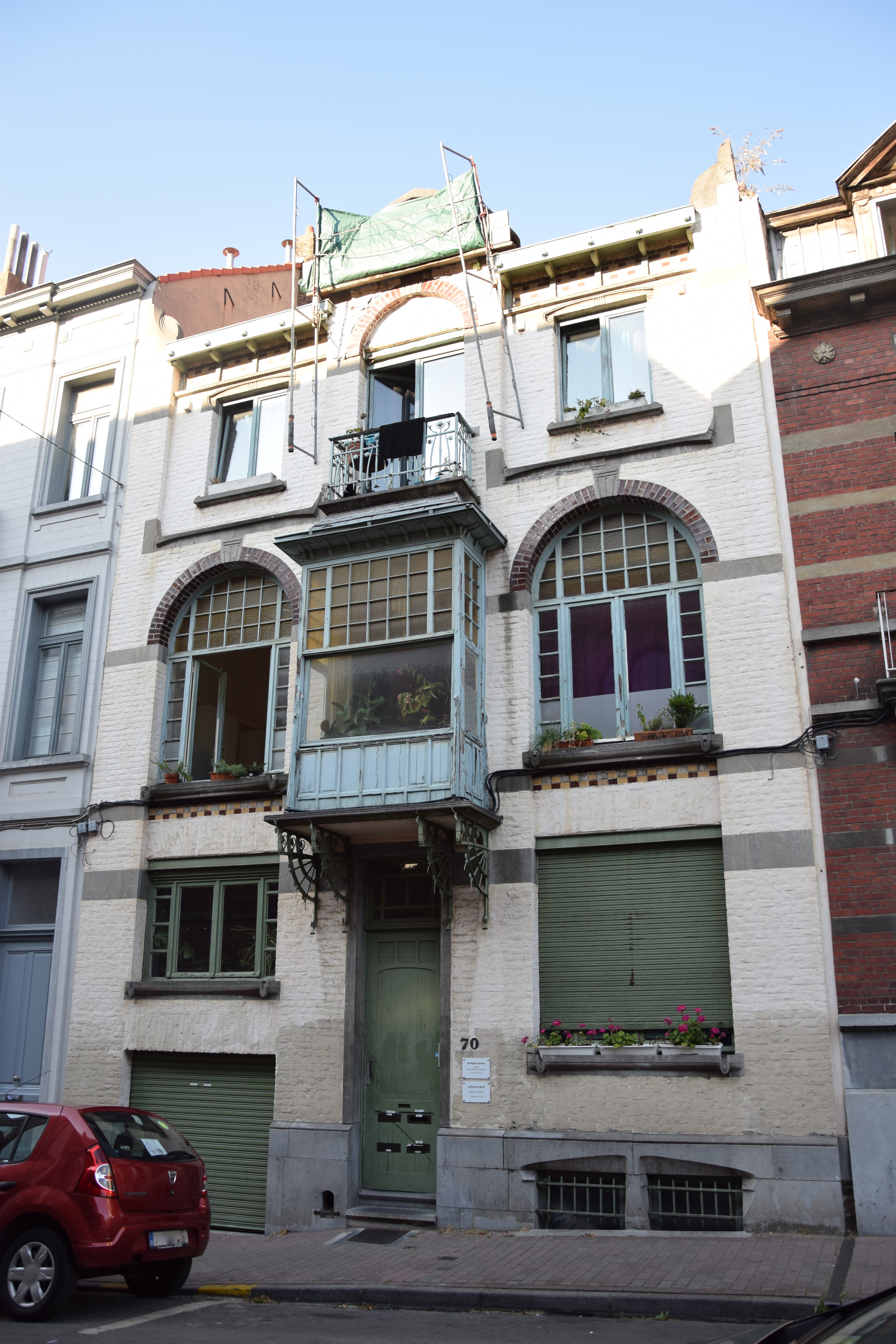
Former Saint-Gilles home and workshop of Jean Gouweloos

Jean Léon Henri Gouweloos (1865/8–1943) was a Belgian painter, draughtsman, affichiste, and lithographer.

== Life ==
Jean Léon Henri Gouweloos was born in Brussels in 1865 or 1868. Before starting his artistic studies, he lived in Paris, designing posters. He then worked in his uncle's printing press, specialising in art prints.

Like his brother Charles (1867–1946), Jean Gouweloos studied from 1887 to 1890 and from 1893 to 1894 at the Royal Academy of Fine Arts in Brussels. He was a pupil of the painter and decorator Albert Charle and the painter Jean Portaels.

From 1887 he exhibited his works in Brussels, Namur, Ostend, and abroad: Paris (1900 and 1903), Düsseldorf (1904), Berlin (1908), Munich (1913). In 1891, he became a member of the artists' circle 'Voorwaarts'. He was a friend of Victor Gilsoul (1867–1939).

In 1895, he joined the 'Le Sillon' movement.

Gouweloos came to prominence around 1900 when he received praise for his paintings of bathers on the northern coast of Belgium. In addition to seascapes and landscapes, he is best known for his images of magnificent interiors with attractive women, especially portraits and nudes, lost in thought or absorbed in small daily activities.

He also produced two frescoes on the ceiling of the Casino-Kursaal in Ostend and twelve paintings for the Lodge of the Freemasons in Brussels (1900).

During the First World War, from 1914 to 1918, he lived with his family as a war refugee in the Netherlands, first in Domburg and then in Scheveningen. There he often painted beach scenes. In Scheveningen, he was friends with the painter Emmanuel Viérin, who also stayed there as a war refugee.

He died in 1943 in Brussels, or perhaps in Ukkel.

== Works ==
His Art Nouveau-style house with workshop in Saint-Gilles is a protected monument in Belgium (fr:Maison-atelier de Jean Gouweloos).

His works are held in several Belgian museums. Le Bain (1907) was purchased by the Royal Museums of Fine Arts of Belgium. Rêverie is in the Royal Museum of Fine Arts Antwerp.

== Gallery ==
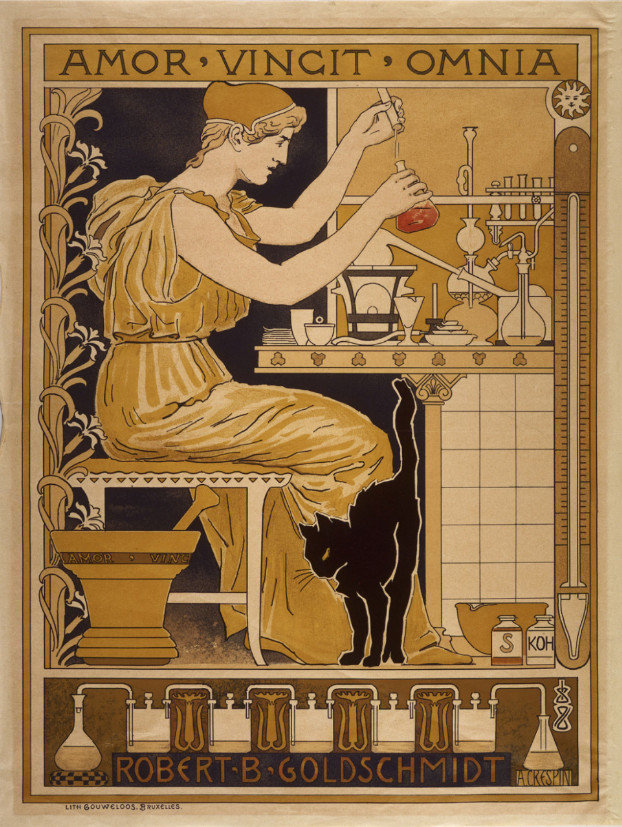
Amor Vincit Omnia, 1895

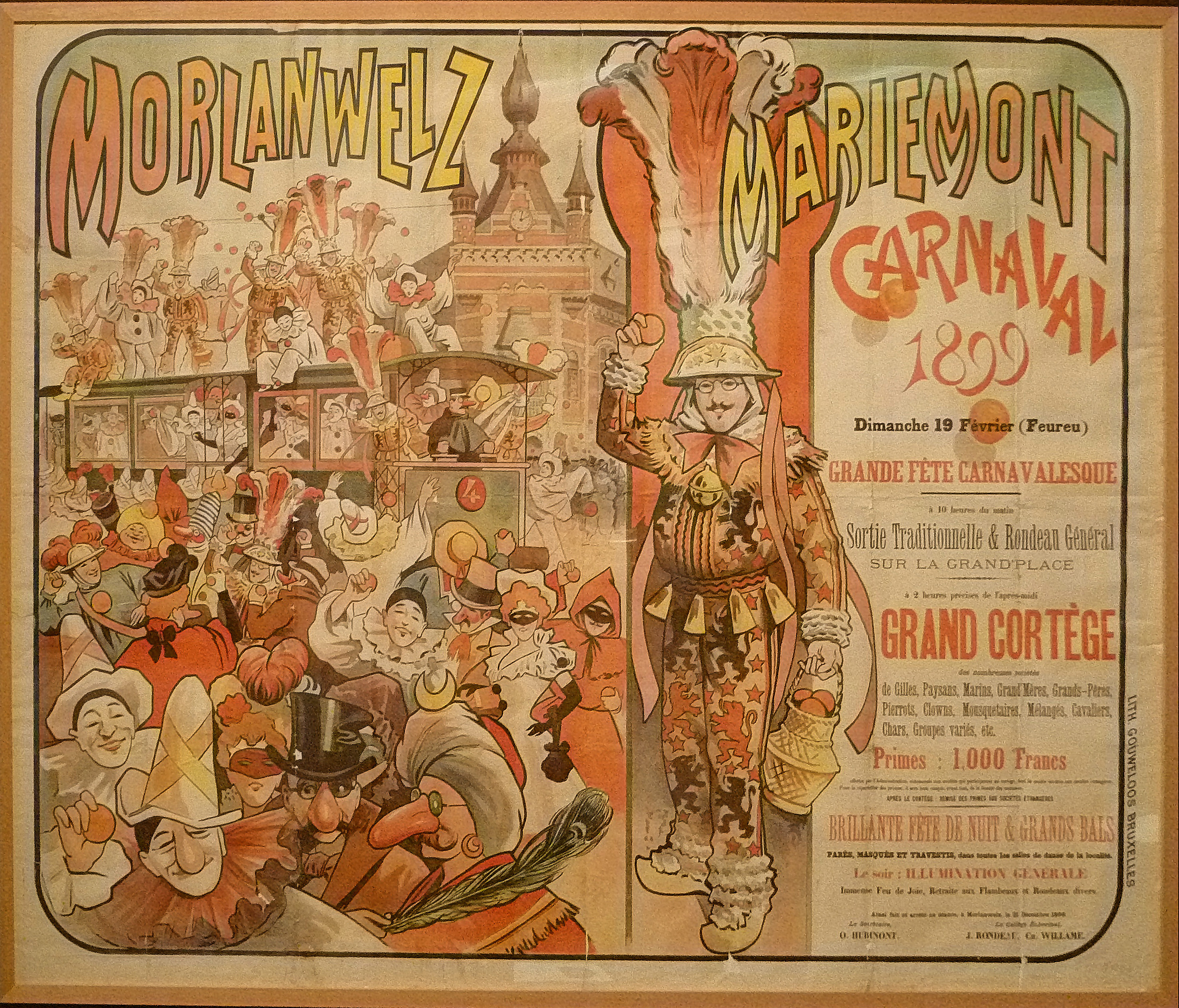
Mariemont Carnaval 1899

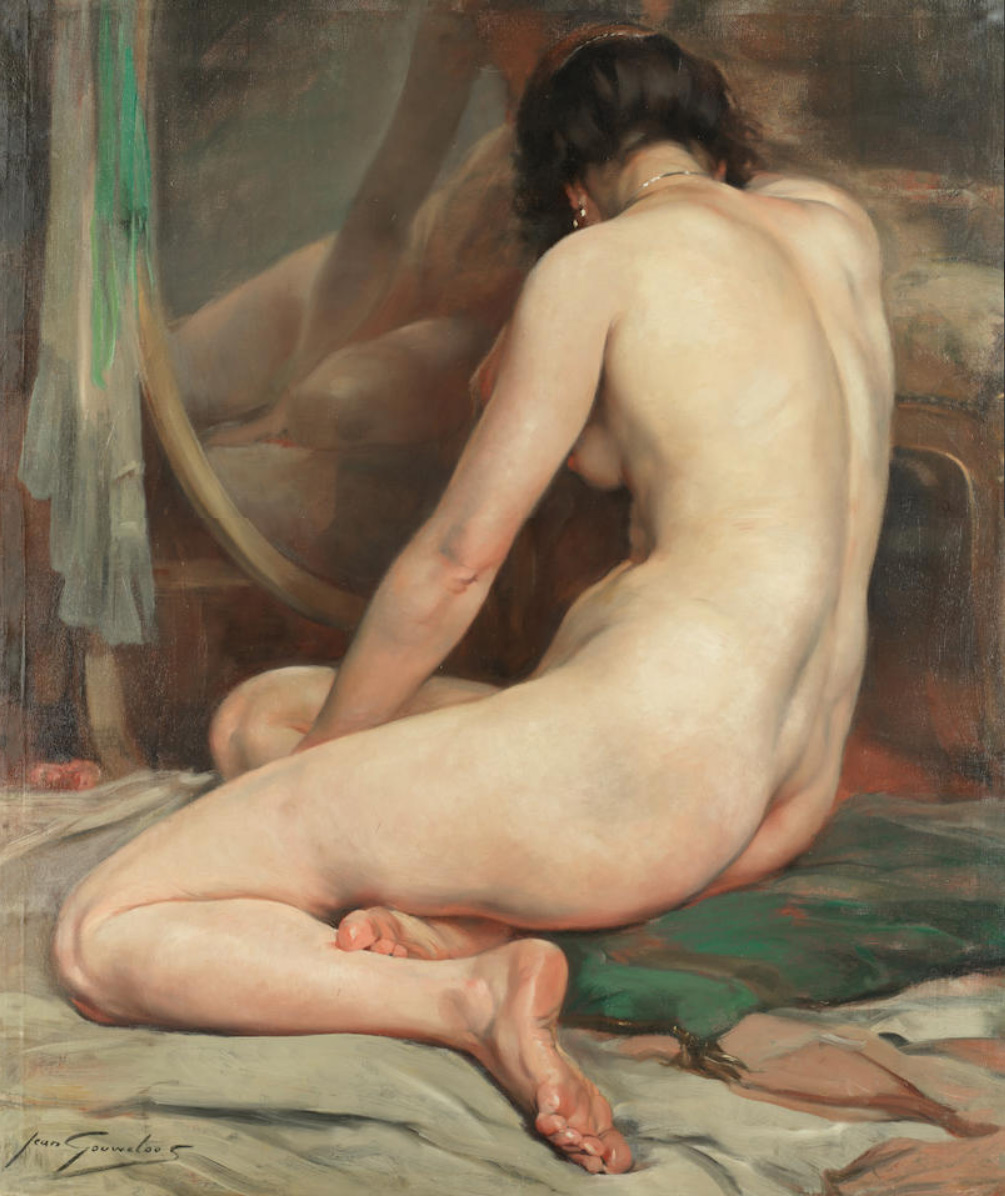
Seated Nude before a Mirror, c. 1900

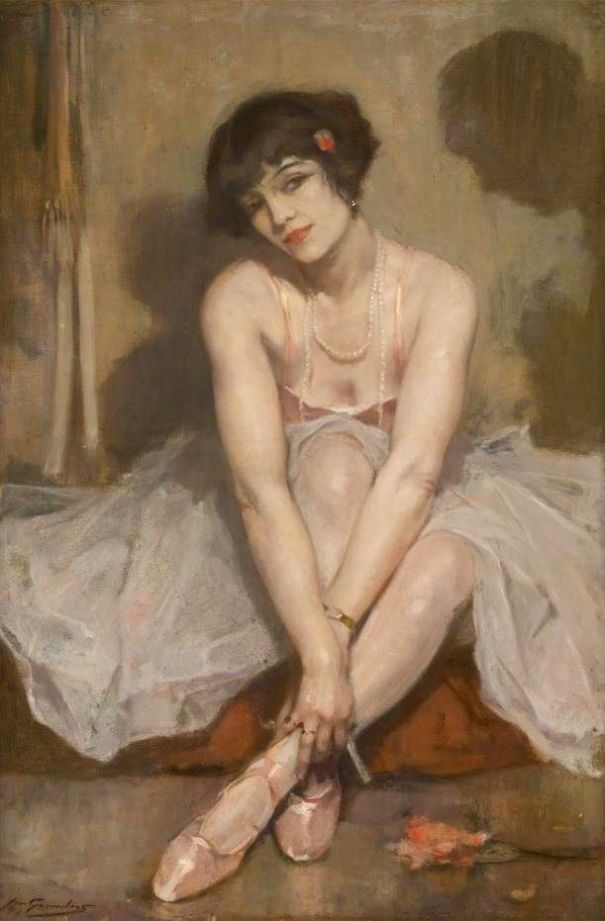
Dancer with a Pearl Necklace, c. 1900

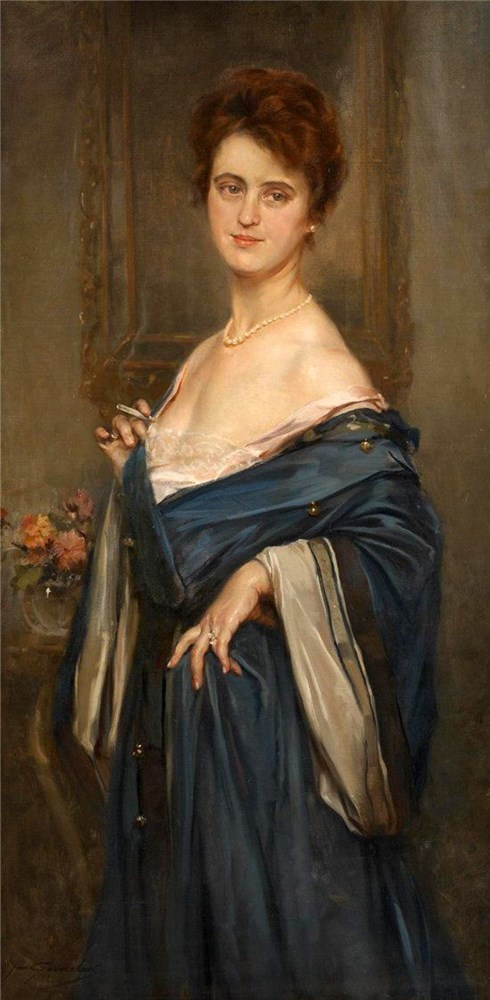
Elegant Lady in a Blue Dress, c. 1900

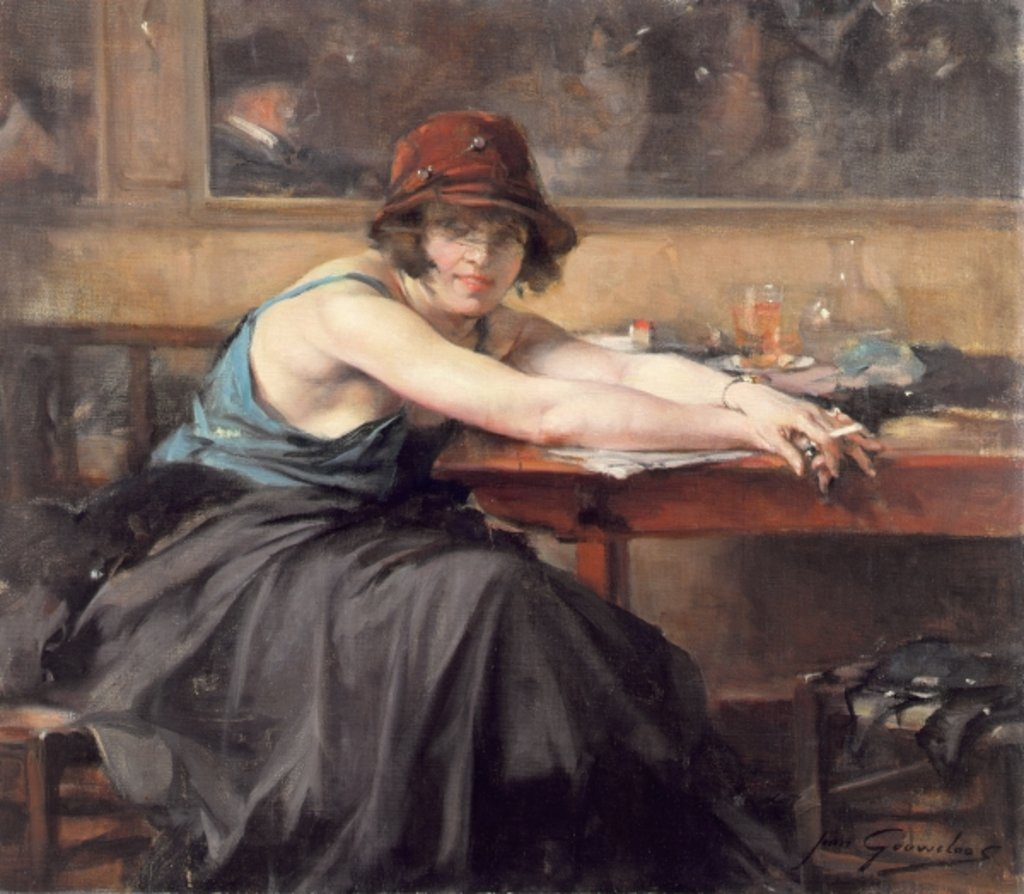
In the Cafe, c. 1900

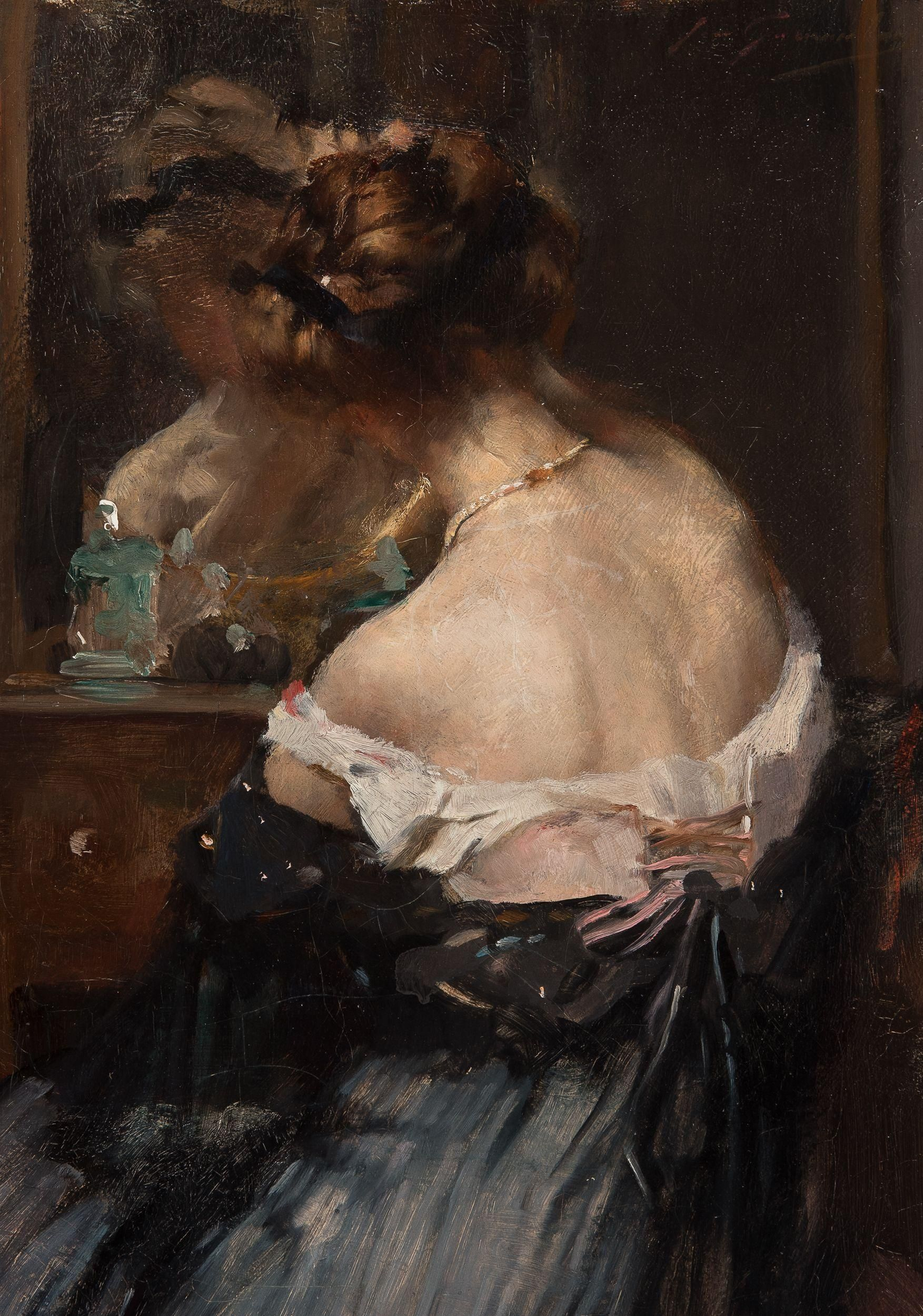
The Toilet, c. 1900

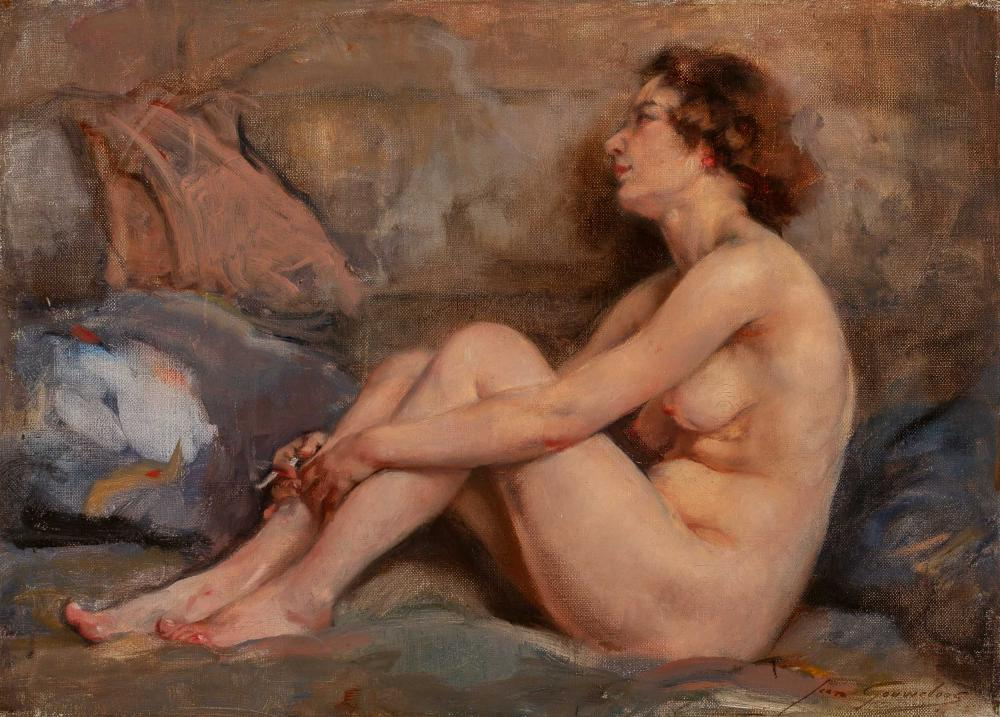
Nude with Cigarette, c. 1900

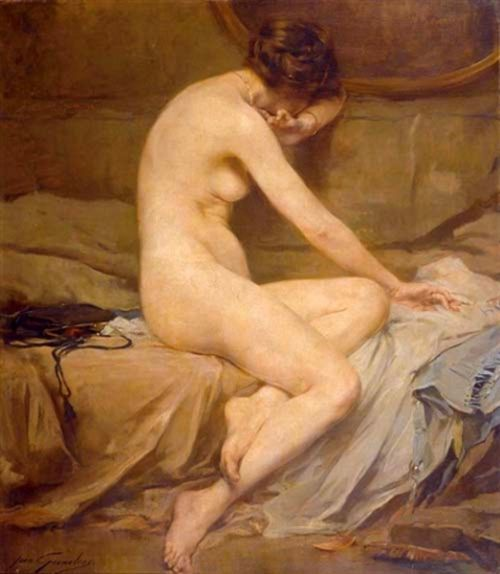
Nude, c. 1900

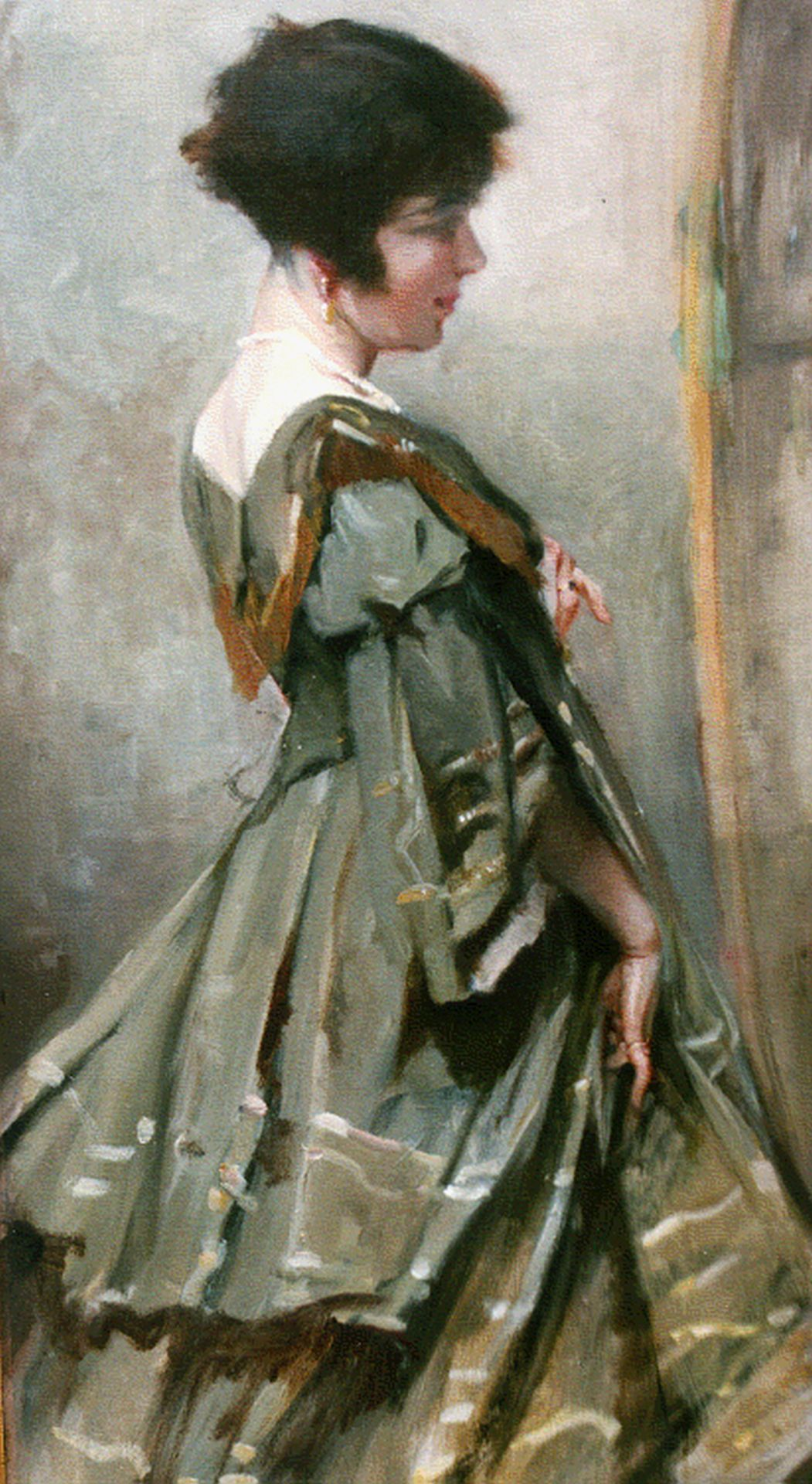
Young Woman before a Mirror, c. 1920

== Sources ==
- Buschmann, P. Jr. (July–December 1908). Onze Kunst. Part 14. Antwerp: J.-E. Buschmann. pp. 45–48.
- Goffart, Anne (2021). "Gouweloos, Jean". Allgemeines Künstlerlexikon (online ed.). Beyer, Andreas; Savoy, Bénédicte; Tegethoff, Wolf (eds.). Berlin, New York: K. G. Saur. Retrieved 4 June 2023 – via De Gruyter.
- "Belgische vluchtelingen in Nederland 1914–1918". Netherlands Institute for Art History. 12 October 2011. Retrieved 4 June 2023.
- "Gouweloos, Jean Leon Henri". Kunstmakelaardij Metzemaekers. Retrieved 4 June 2023.
- "Gouweloos, Jean Léon Henri". Benezit Dictionary of Artists (online ed.). Oxford University Press. 31 October 2011. Retrieved 4 June 2023.
- "Jean Gouweloos". Gallerease. Retrieved 4 June 2023.
- "Jean Gouweloos". Mark Smit Kunsthandel. Retrieved 4 June 2023.
- "Jean Gouweloos (1865 – Brussels – 1943)". Ambrose Naumann Fine Art. Retrieved 4 June 2023.
- "Jean Gouweloos Het bad 1907 — Inv. 3876". Koninklijke Musea voor Schone Kunsten van België. Retrieved 4 June 2023.
- "Strandgezicht te Domburg, Jean Leon Henri Gouweloos, 1917". Rijksmuseum. Retrieved 4 June 2023.
- "Tijdelijk Thuisland, Belgische kunstenaars in Domburg 1914–1918". NederBelgischMagazine. 7 July 2014. Retrieved 4 June 2023.
- "Woning met kunstenaarsatelier van kunstschilder Jean Gouweloos (1865–1943)". Patrimoine.Brussels. Retrieved 4 June 2023.
- «Maison-atelier de l'artiste-peintre Jean Gouweloos (1865–1943)». Patrimoine.Brussels. Retrieved 4 June 2023.
- «Œuvre «Le bain» 1907 — Inv. 3876». Musées royaux des Beaux-Arts de Belgique. Retrieved 4 June 2023.
