= Pyar Ki Jeet =

Pyar Ki Jeet (transl. Love Wins) may refer to these Indian films:

- Pyar Ki Jeet (1948 film), Hindi
- Pyar Ki Jeet (1962 film), Hindi film of 1962
- Pyar Ki Jeet (1987 film), Hindi
- Hogi Pyaar Ki Jeet (1999) (lit. 'Love Will Win'), Hindi
- Nannu Dochukunduvate (2018), Telugu, titled Pyar Ki Jeet in Hindi
- Jayam (2002 film), Telugu, titled Phir Hogi Pyar Ki Jeet in Hindi

== See also ==
- Love Wins (disambiguation)
- Mohabbat Ki Jeet (transl. Love Wins), a 1943 Indian film
