= Love Wins =

Love Wins may refer to:

- Love Wins: A Book About Heaven, Hell, and the Fate of Every Person Who Ever Lived, 2011 book by pastor Rob Bell
- Love Wins: The Lovers and Lawyers Who Fought the Landmark Case for Marriage Equality, 2016 book by Debbie Cenziper
- "Love Wins" (song), a 2018 song by Carrie Underwood from Cry Pretty
- "Love Wins", a 2016 song by Michael McArthur
- "Love Wins", a 2012 song by Kari Jobe with Jason Crabb on Love Is Stronger

== See also ==
- "Love Wins All", a 2024 song by IU initially announced as "Love Wins"
- Love Conquers All (disambiguation)
- Pyar Ki Jeet (disambiguation)
