= Luminism (Impressionism) =

Style in painting

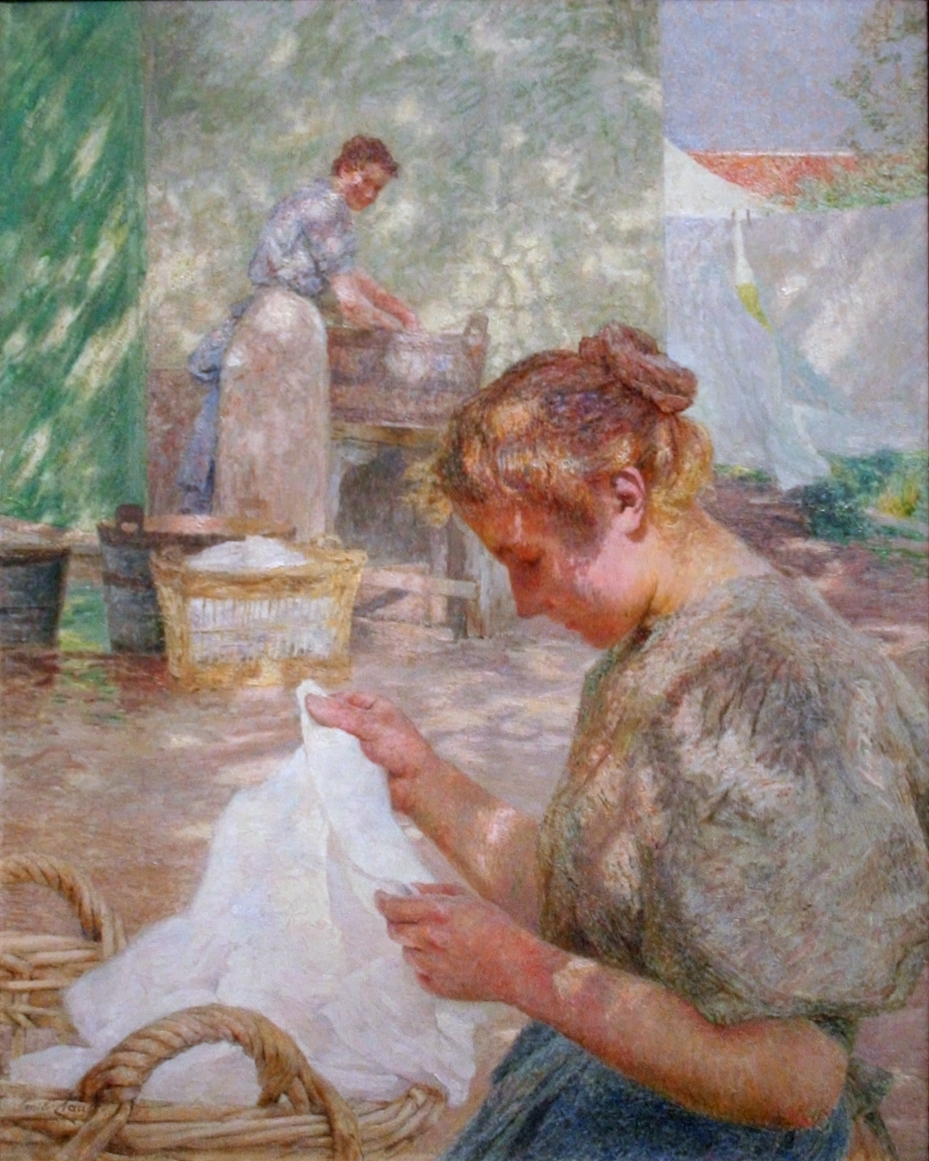
Emile Claus, Sunny Day (1899). Oil on canvas, 93 cm × 74 cm (37 in × 29 in) The Museum of Fine Arts, Ghent

Luminism is a late-impressionist or neo-impressionist style in painting which devotes great attention to light effects.

The term has been used for the style of the Belgian (mainly Flemish) painters such as Emile Claus and Théo van Rysselberghe and their followers Adriaan Jozef Heymans, Anna Boch, Évariste Carpentier, Guillaume Van Strydonck, Leon de Smet, Jenny Montigny, Anna De Weert, George Morren, Rodolphe De Saegher, Emmanuel Viérin, Modest Huys, Georges Buysse, Marcel Jefferys, Yvonne Serruys and Juliette Wytsman, as well as for the early pointillist work of the Dutch painters Jan Toorop, Leo Gestel, Jan Sluijters, and Piet Mondriaan.

After Emile Claus died in 1930, his pupil, Anna de Weert continued to paint in the luminist style at her studio near Ghent.

In the Spanish painting the luminism term or Valencian luminism used for the work of a group of prominent Spanish painters led by Joaquín Sorolla, Ignacio Pinazo Camarlench, Teodoro Andreu, Francisco Benítez Mellado and Vicente Castell.

The Belgian and Dutch styles have little in common: Emile Claus's work is still close to that of the great French impressionists, especially Claude Monet, whereas Dutch luminism, characterized by the use of large color patches, is closer to fauvism.

== History ==
=== Origins and Early Development ===
Luminism evolved in the late nineteenth century in Europe as a form of Impressionism for the regional areas. It was especially pronounced in Belgium and Spain, where painters attempted to capture light and to define its particular manifestation in the local atmosphere. Belgian painters Émile Claus and Théo van Rysselberghe brought together the color and technique of Impressionism with the more subdued tonalities of the northern sky, evolving what came to be called the School of Latem. Their works were often of country scenes, bathed in gentle daylight and tranquil feeling. On the other hand, in Spain, Joaquín Sorolla became the head of the Valencian Luminist movement interpreting the intense Mediterranean sunlight playing on the water, the people, and the sand. His paintings focused on movement, light, and the exuberant energy of outdoor existence, which gave Luminism a particular southern warmth.

=== Growth and Cultural Significance ===
By the first decade of the twentieth century, Luminism was an established artistic vogue that exulted brightness, natural light, and serene arrangement. Akin to Impressionism, it had a more subdued and restrained, Lucien-period sensibility, eschewing the disintegration of form which appeared in later avant-garde styles. The movement captured the aspirations of modern life as well as the balance between nature and human activity. It was in Belgium and Spain where it became an established expression of national and regional identity, fusing technical rigour with emotional brilliance. The focus on atmosphere and the poetic possibilities of light that Luminism represented would continue to impact European landscape and portraiture painting between Impressionism and the developing aesthetics of modern realism.

== Luminism’s Influence with Impressionism ==
Luminism had a strong influence on Belgium art in the early 20th century, which changed the way artists viewed and conveyed “light color and atmosphere” through art pieces. The Belgian artist got inspiration from French Impressionist artists and developed his own style. They combined techniques from France with local artistic traditions. These connections create unique Impressionism called Luminism, which focuses on bright and colorful and nuanced light to build up nature and mood in the picture.

Artists from Latem School played an important role in development. They used the Luminism technique to express symbolic ideas and personal emotions, creating landscapes where light helps bring feeling and structure to the picture.

The influence of Luminism continued to appear in late art, such as Expressionism and the work in the Nervia group, where artists continued to explore how light, color, and lines affect the meaning of their work. Luminism had a big influence on Belgian painting and left a long-lasting mark on the country’s art.

== Characteristic of Belgian Luminism ==
Belgian Luminism is adapted from the concept of French Impressionism to give this art form a more unique and personal style, mainly focusing on light to express the artist’s feelings. The main characteristic is the control of light, which makes the light appear smooth and realistic. Artists focus on natural light such as dawn, reflections on the water’s surface, or light fog.

Another characteristic is the focus on the surface of objects. Artists in this style of art make the surface show brushstrokes clearly, unlike Impressionism, which highlights visible brush marks. Other characteristics include calm, balanced, and still compositions. The atmosphere feels quiet, pure, and motionless, as if time has stopped. Finally, Belgian Luminism usually depicts natural scenes such as lakes, mountains, and rivers.

=== uniqueness ===
Belgian Luminism can be separated into four aspects that differentiate it from Impressionism.

1. Mood and tone, Luminism evokes feelings of quietness, calmness, and meditation.
2. Light. The characteristic of light in Belgian Luminism is carefully controlled and serene, different from Impressionism, which is dynamic and ever-changing.
3. Texture, The texture of objects in this art style is mainly smooth and refined.
4. Expression, Luminism tends to emphasize stillness and observation.

=== Techniques ===
Artists are mostly used in five techniques such as

1. Subtle color gradation an artist applying multiple thin layers of paint to create smooth, glowing light without visible strokes.
2. Controlled light contrast, they manage light and shadow gently for natural transitions.
3. Crisp edges technique even within softness, edges like horizons or waterlines remain clear.
4. Balanced warm and cool tones example for golden sunlight blending with cool blues or greens.
5. Invisible brushwork this technique artists conceal brushstrokes to let viewers feel they are looking at nature itself, not paint on canvas.

== Notable Artists of Belgian Luminism ==
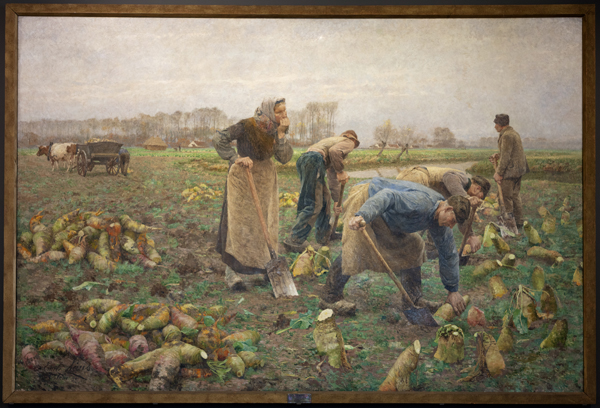
"The Beet Harvest'' (1890), oil on canvas, by Émile Claus.

In Belgium, Émile Claus became the main exponent of Luminism, applying Impressionist methods to the colder light of the North. His works such as The Beet Harvest (1890) and Sunny Meadows (c.1900) are typical examples of the bright and cool colors and peaceful mood of the style.

== Gallery ==
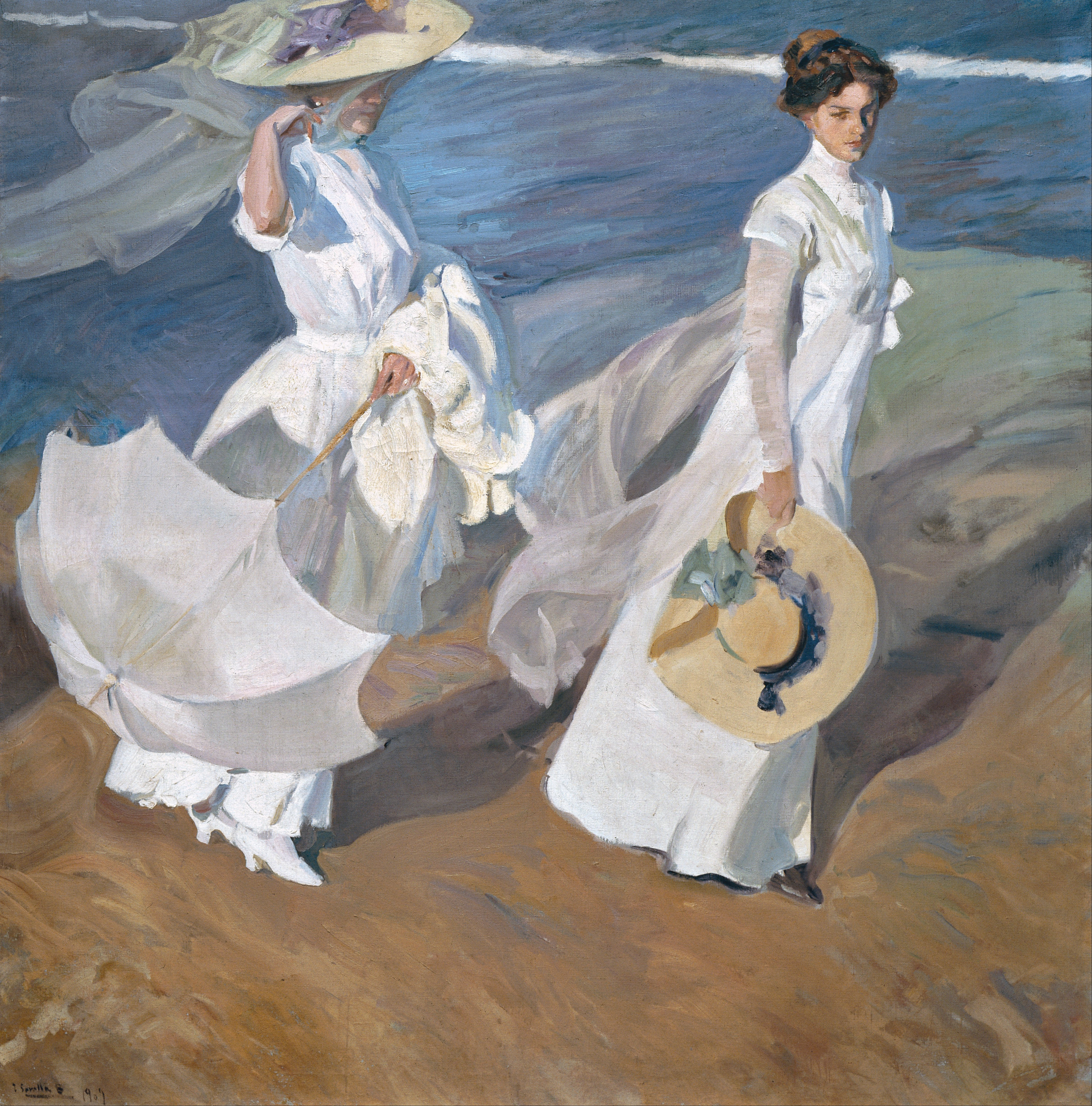
Paseo a orillas del mar, de Joaquín Sorolla, 1909.

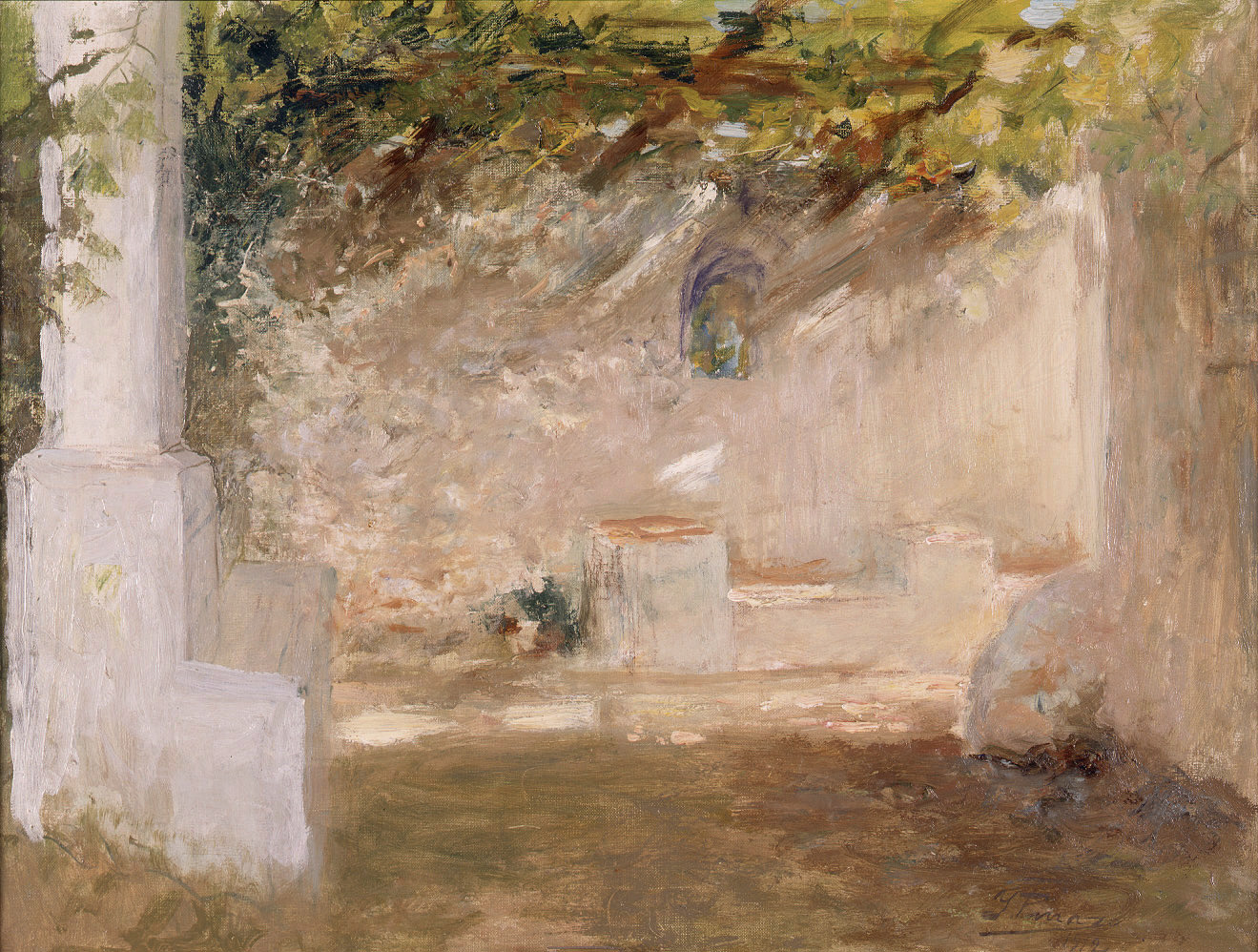
Emparrado, de Ignacio Pinazo, 1912.

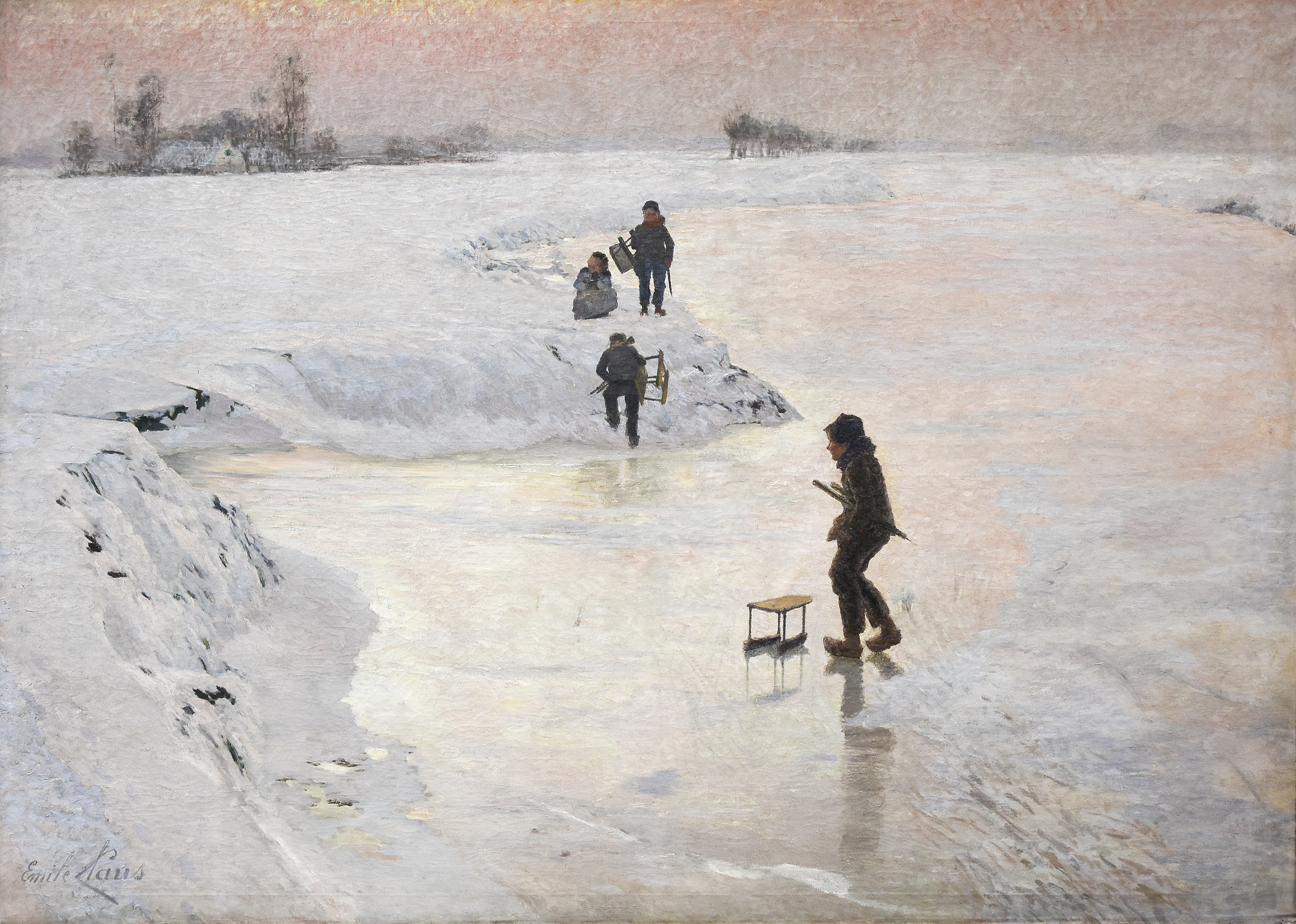
Emile Claus
Skaters

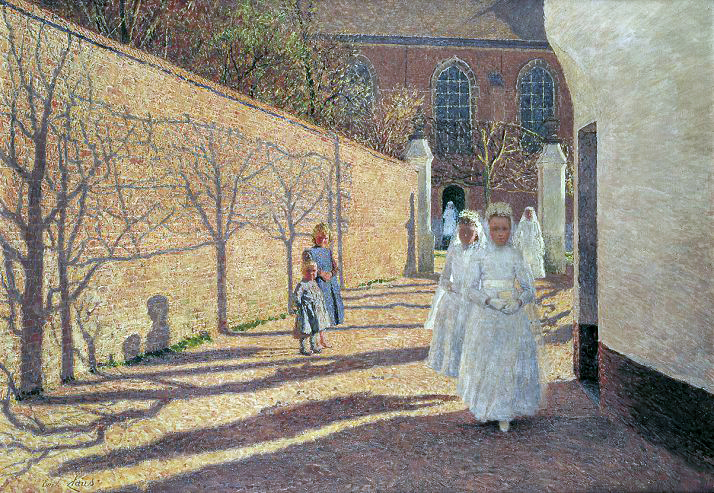
Emile Claus
First Communion

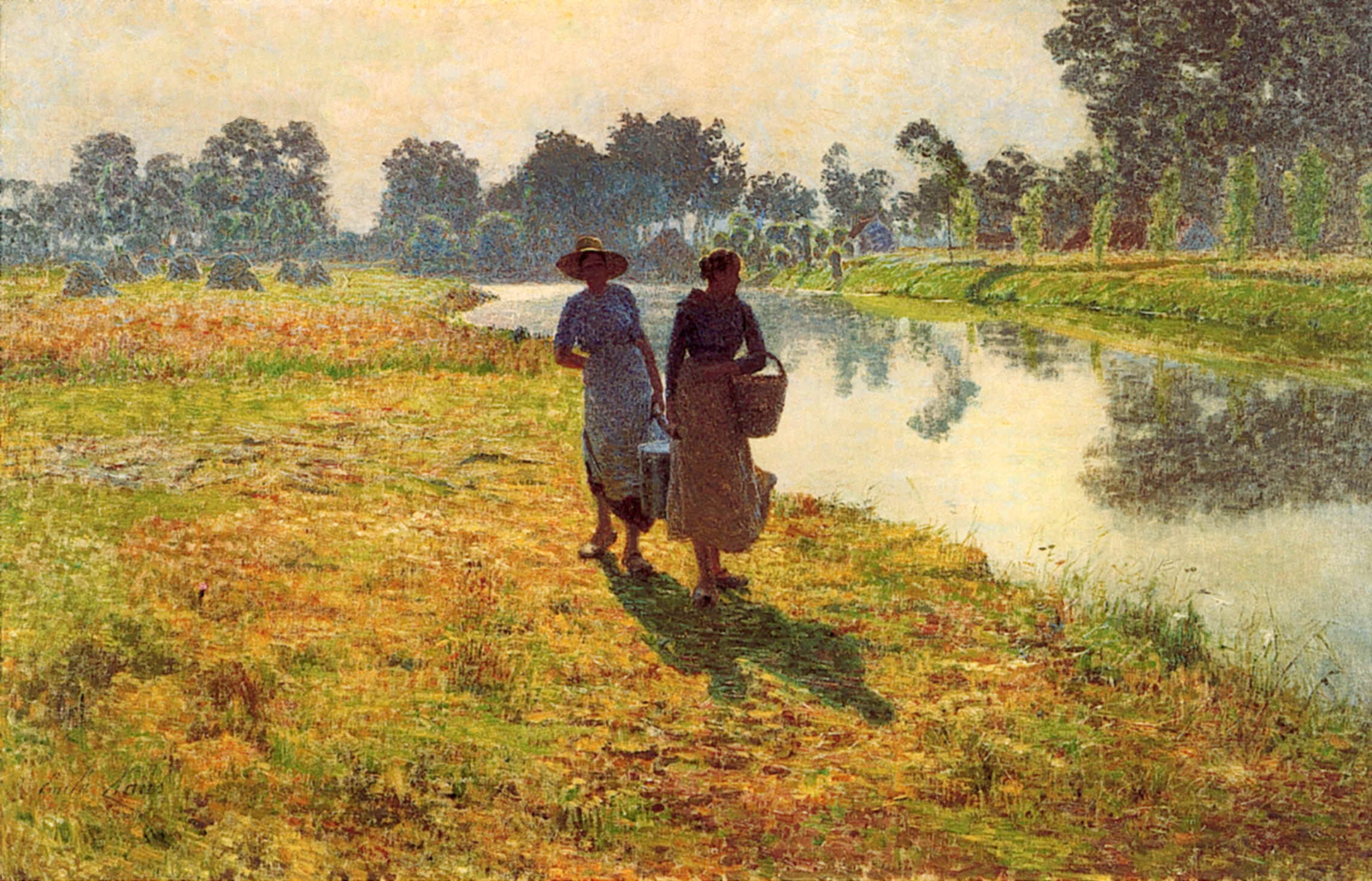
Emile Claus
Young peasant women at the Leie

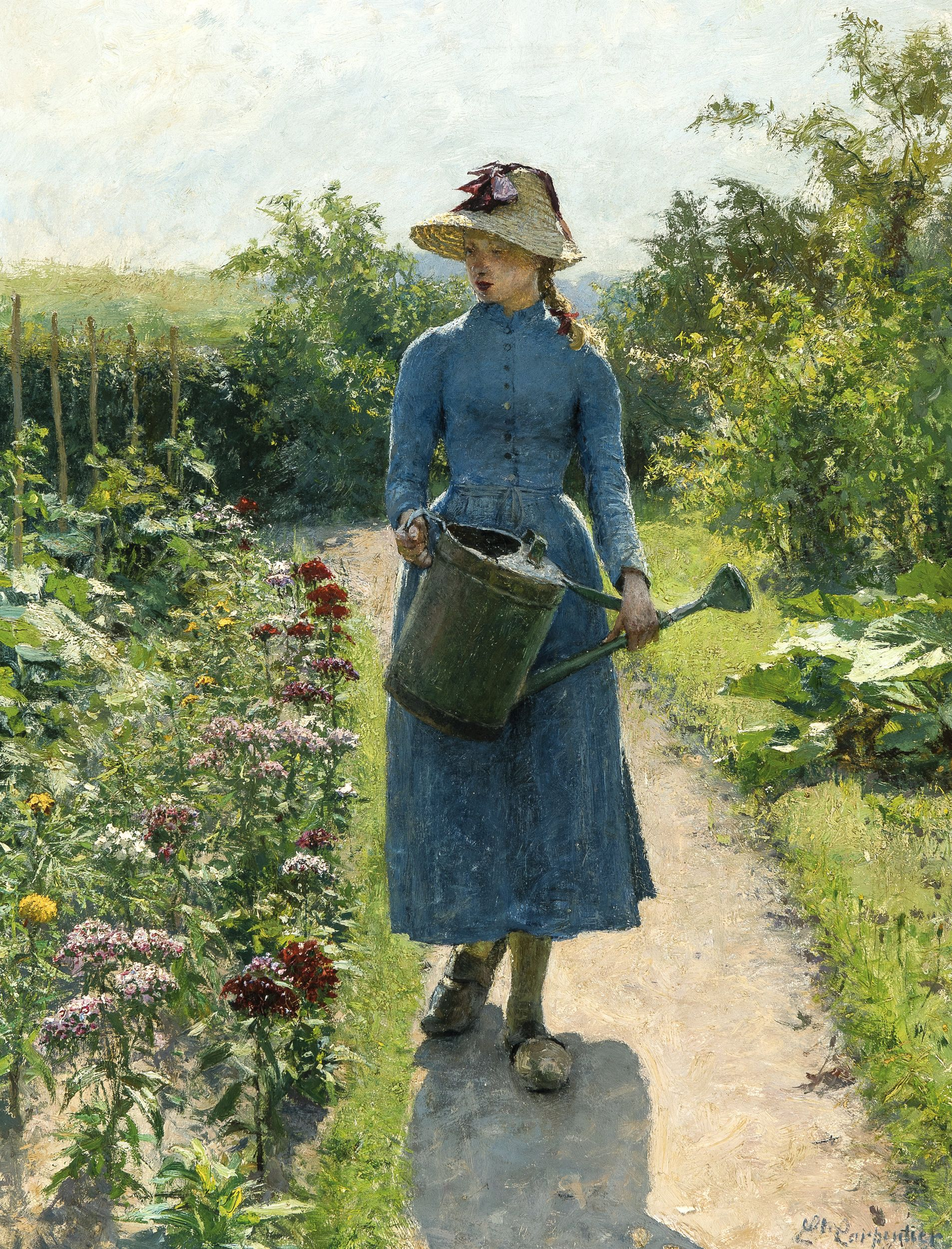
Évariste Carpentier
Girl with a Watering Can

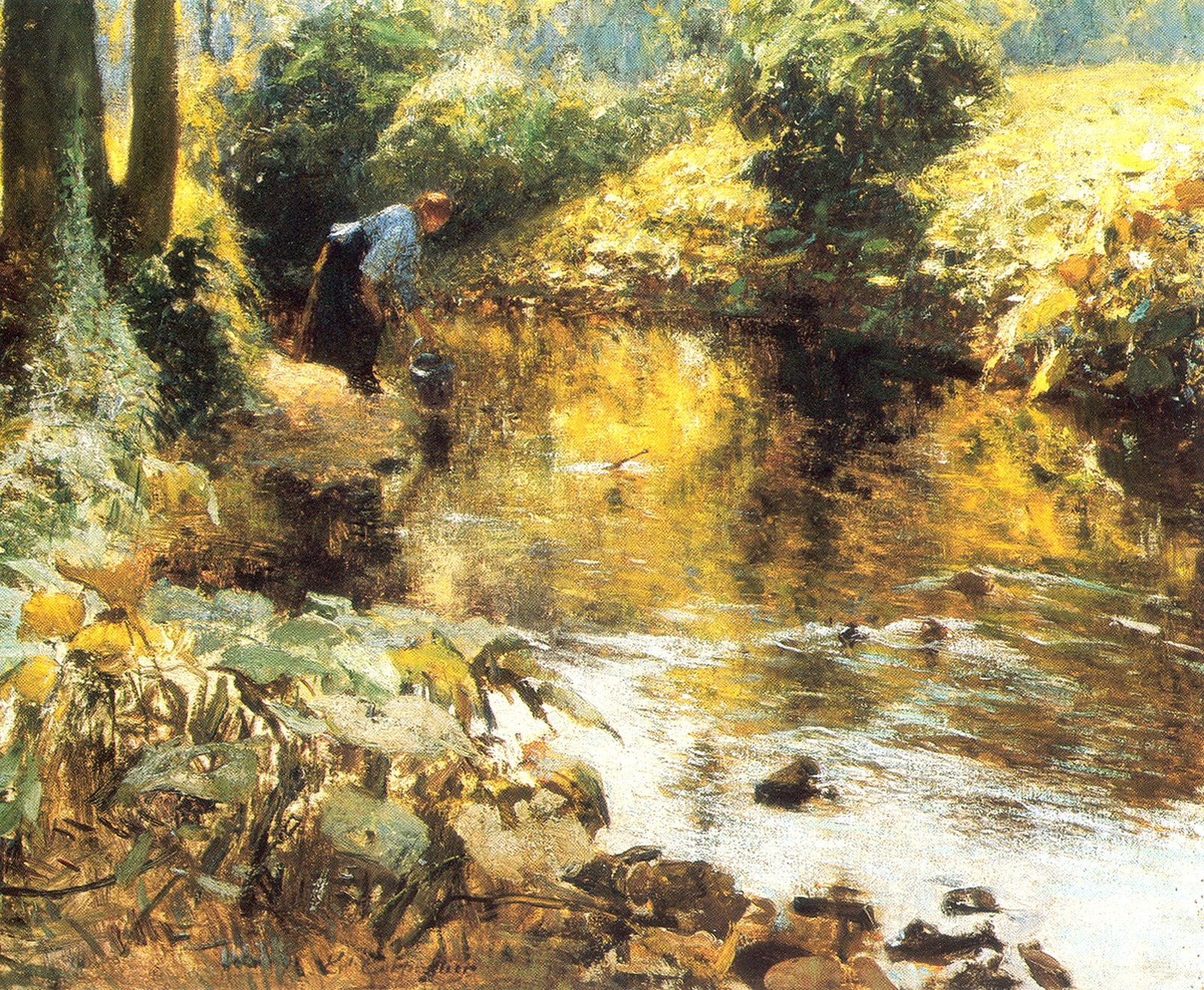
Évariste Carpentier
Near River

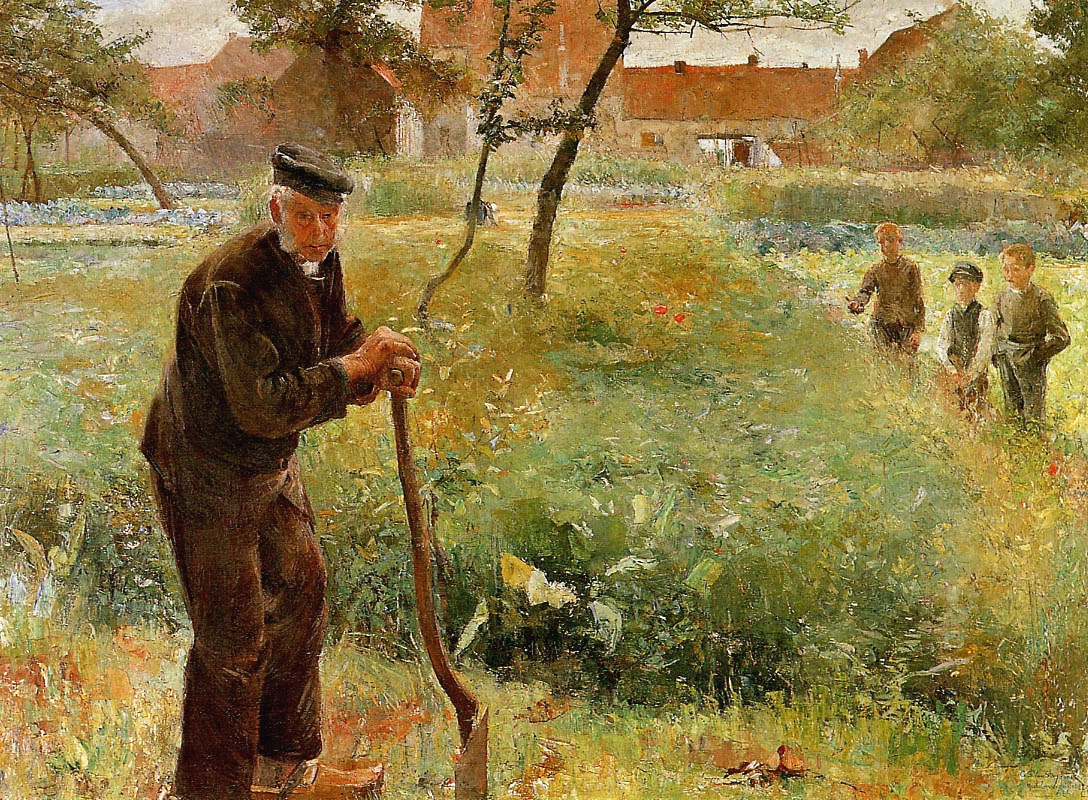
Guillaume Van Strydonck
The Old Gardener

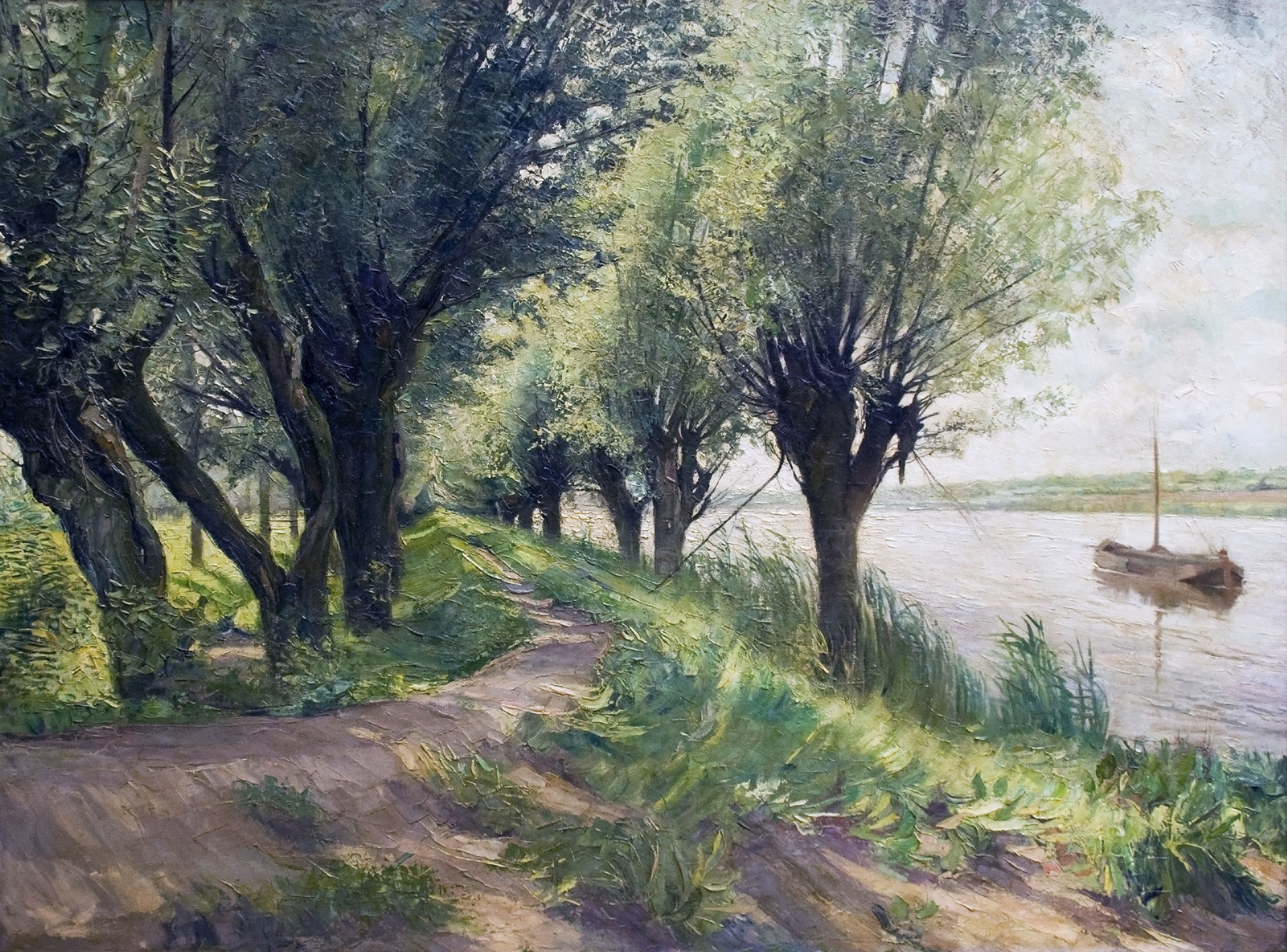
Guillaume Van Strydonck
Willows by the Scheldt

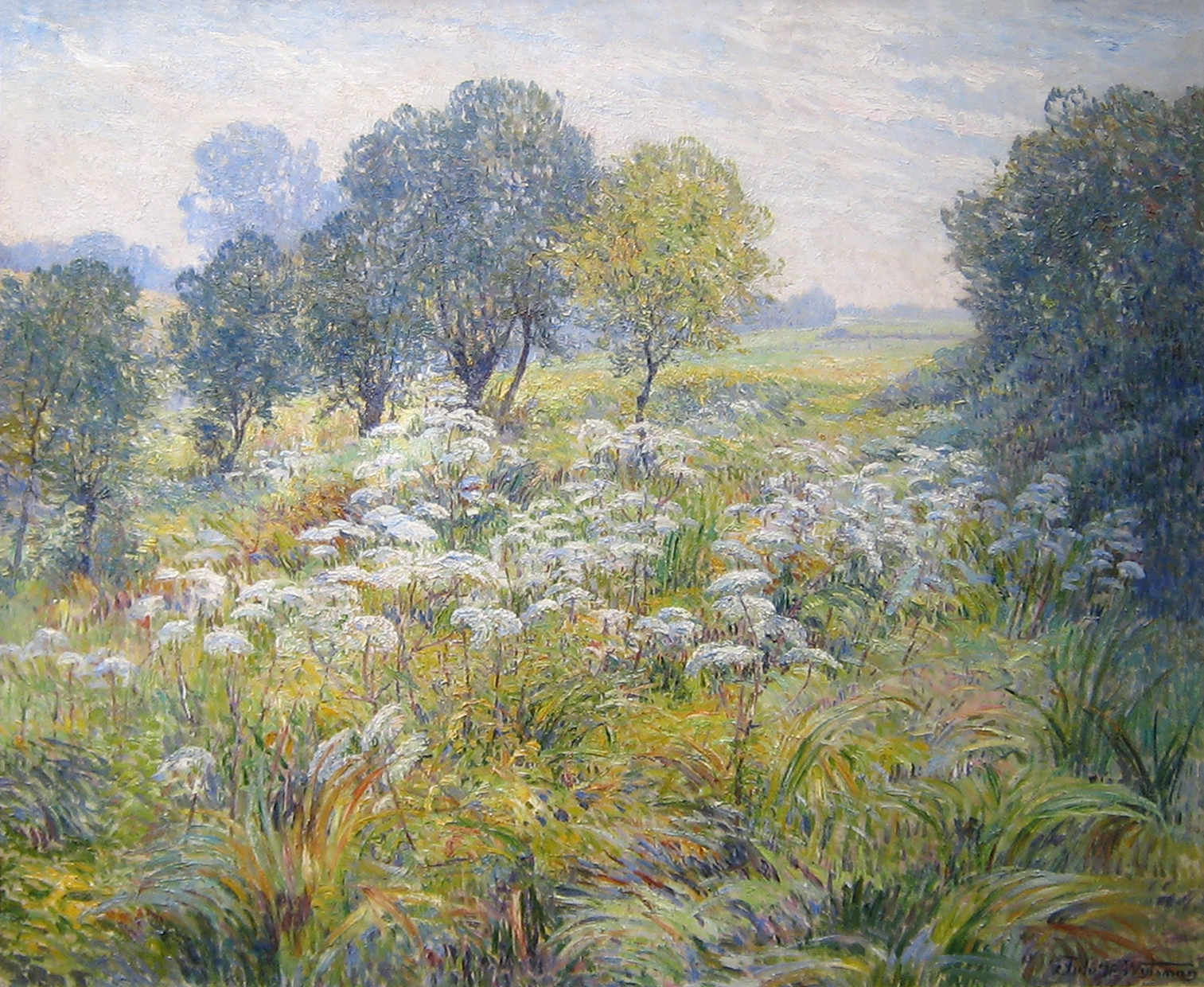
Juliette Wytsman
Spirea

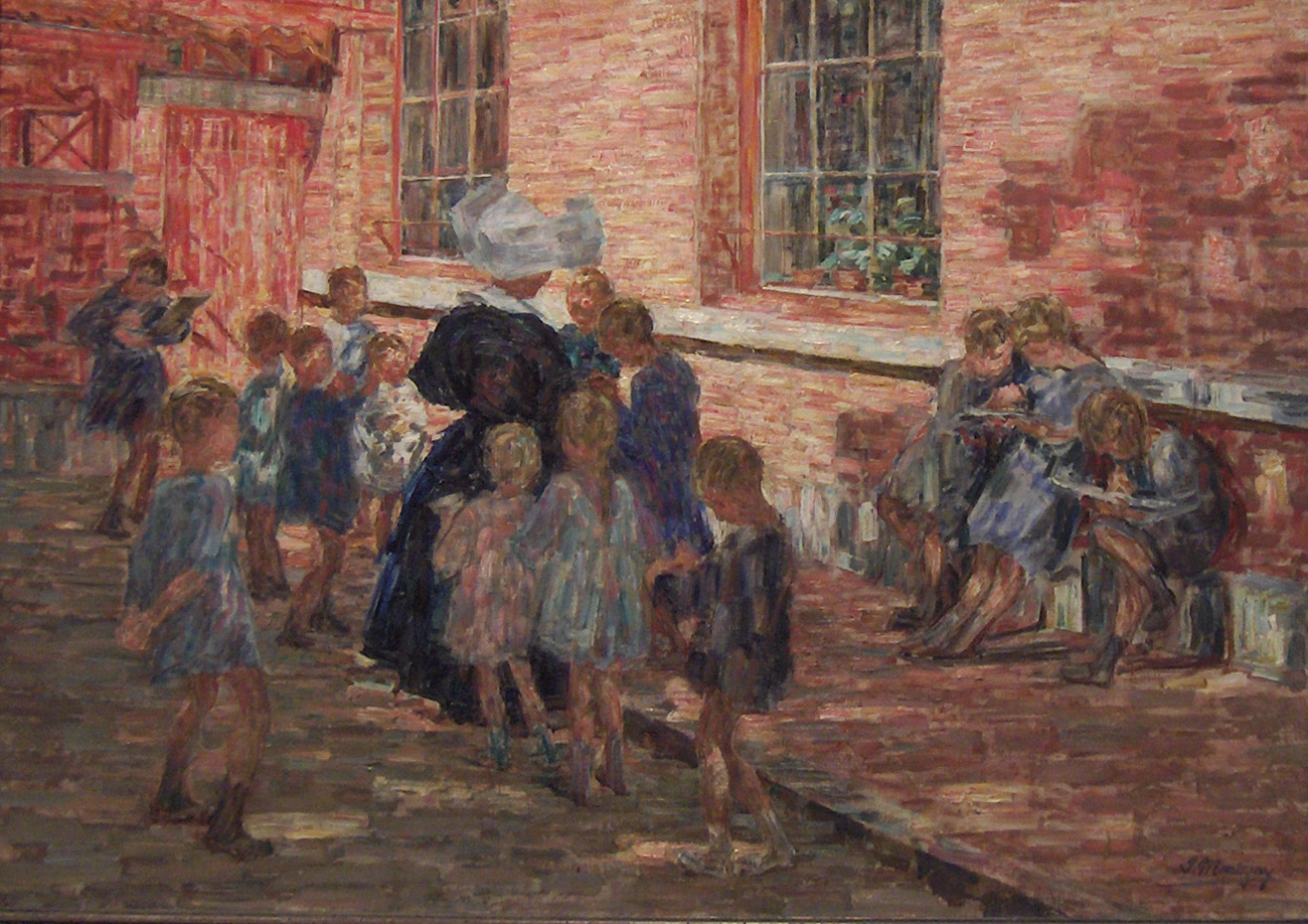
Jenny Montigny
Deurle Kindergarten

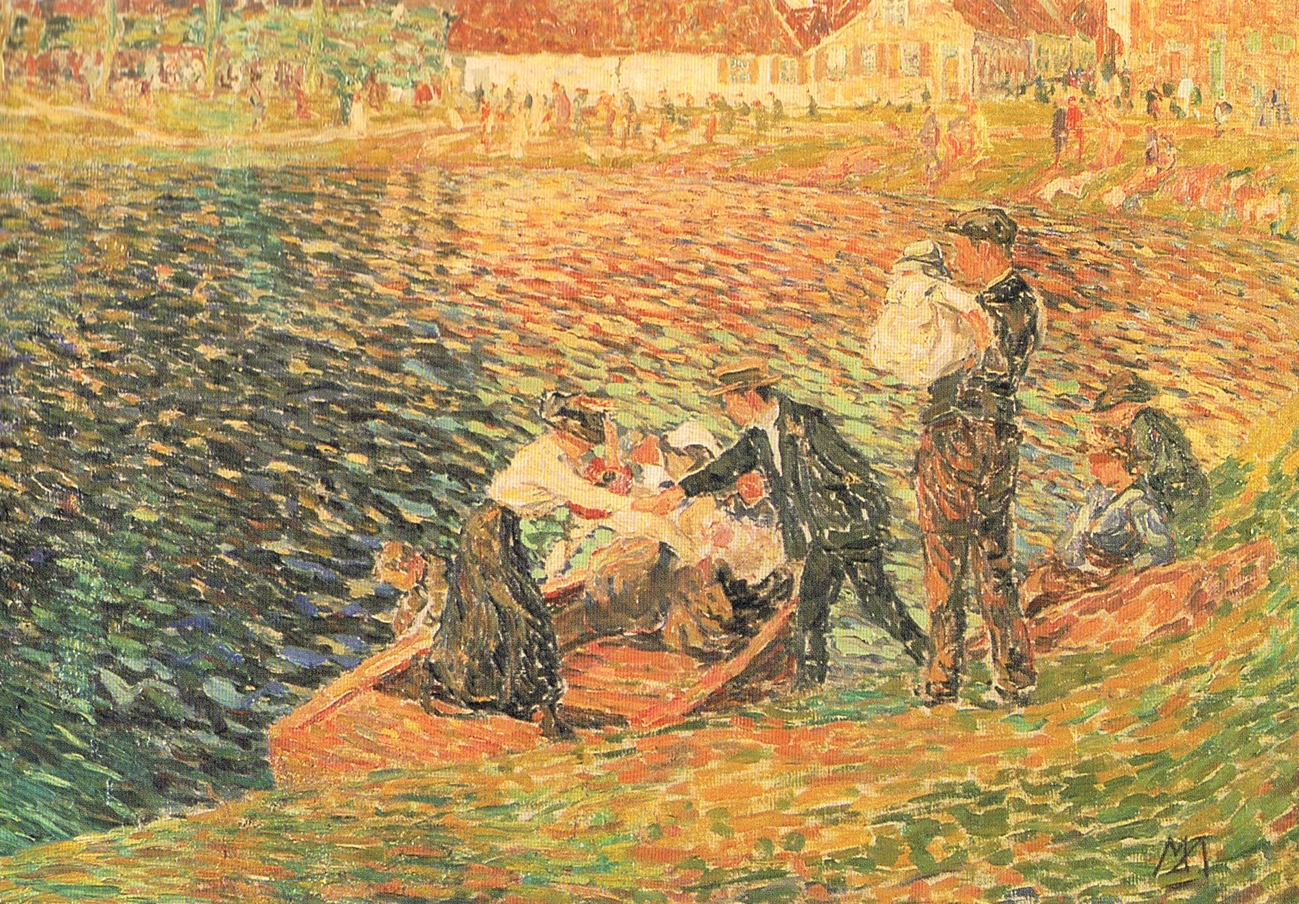
Modest Huys
Crossing

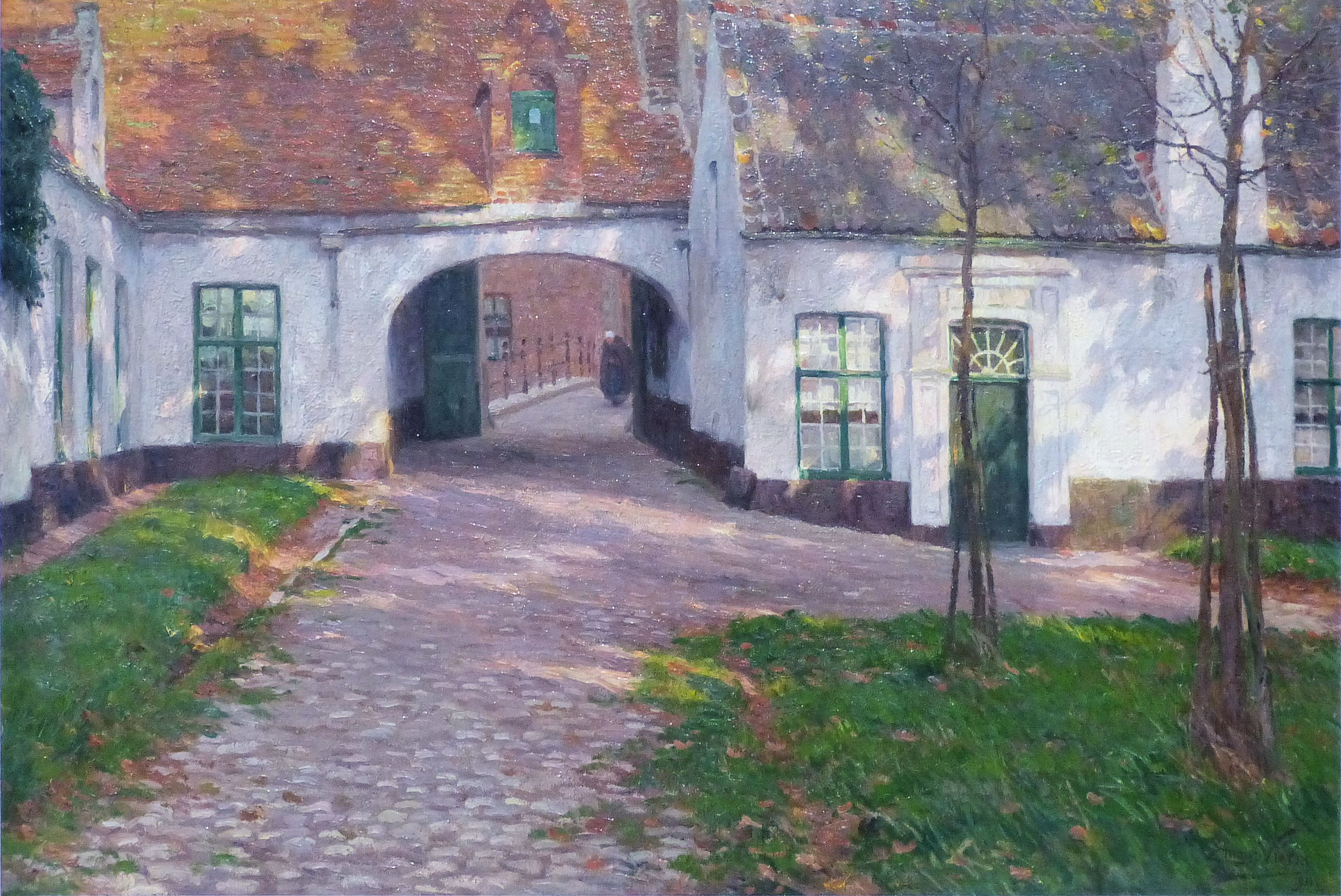
Emmanuel Viérin

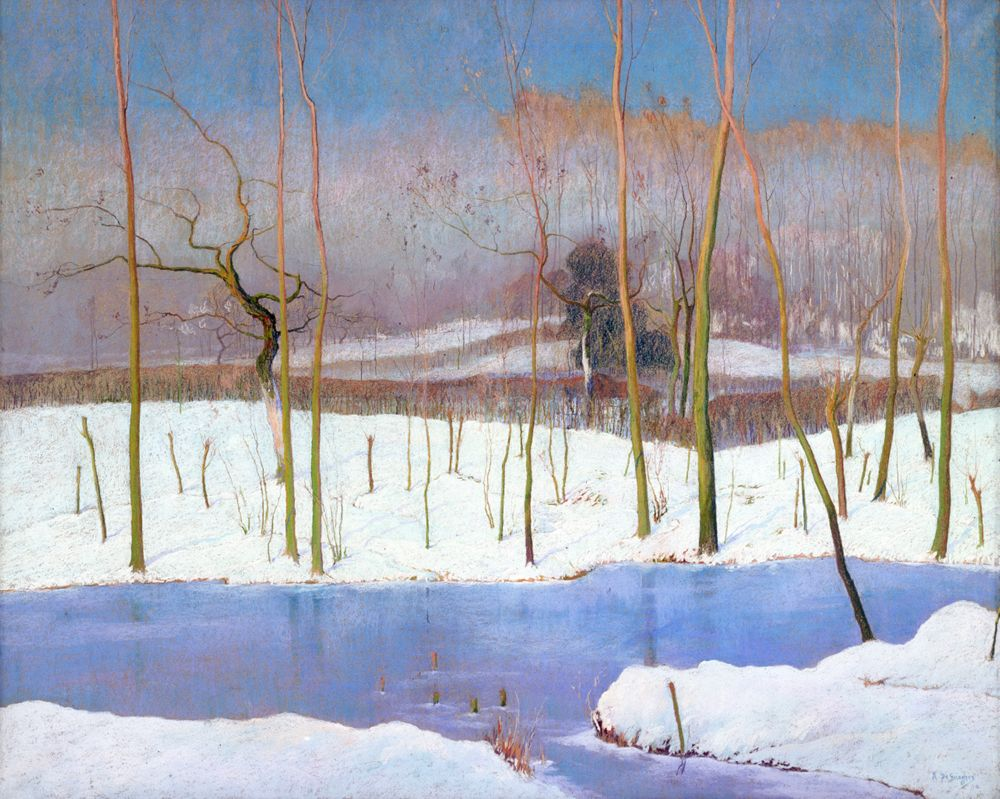
Rodolphe De Saegher
