= Emmanuel Viérin =

Belgian painter (1869–1954)

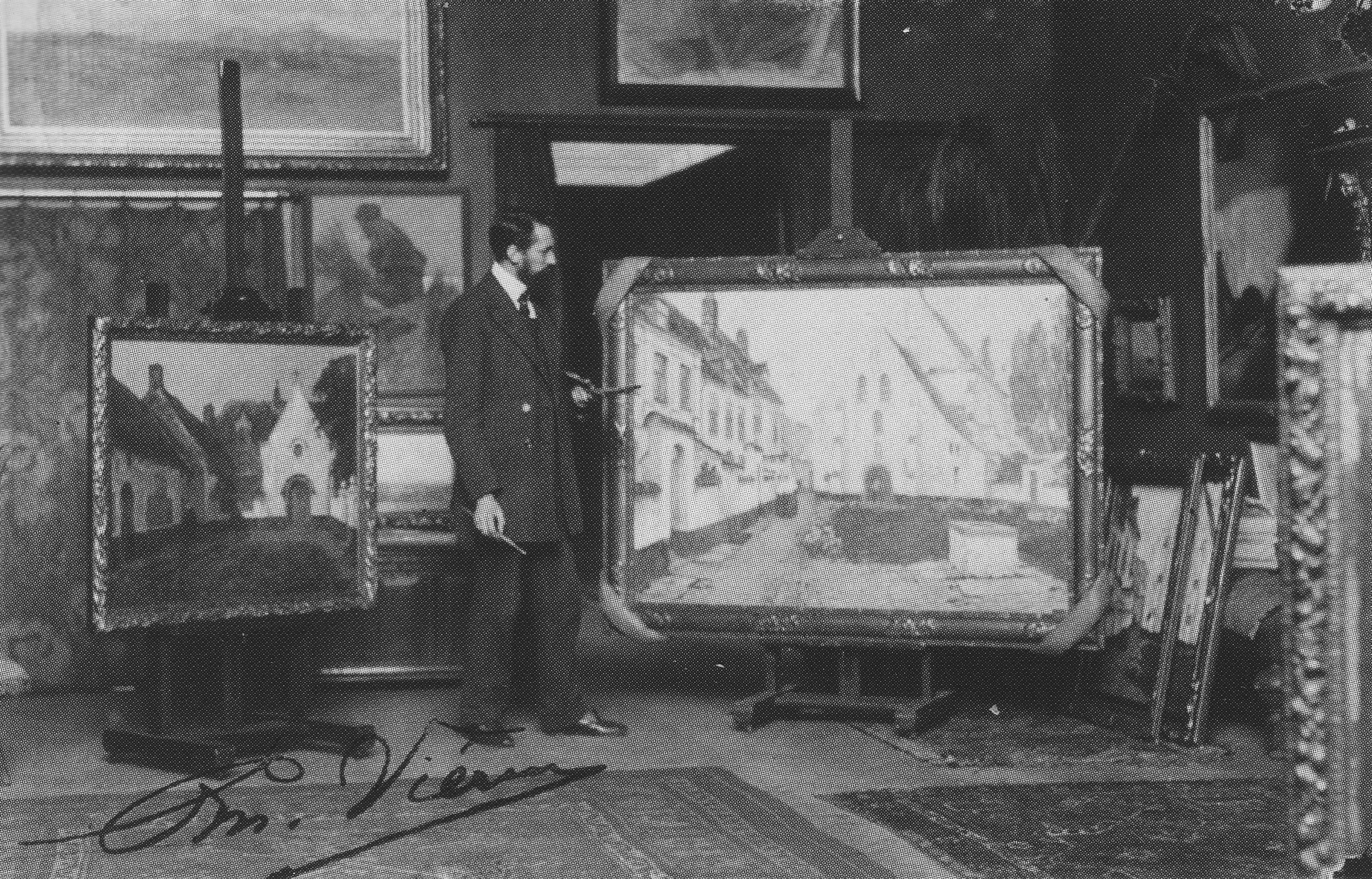
- Born: 30 June 1869; Courtrai (Kortrijk)
- Died: 13 January 1954 (aged 84); Courtrai (Kortrijk)
- Movement: Luminism (Impressionism)
- Website: http://www.emmanuelvierin.be

Emmanuel Viérin is a Belgian painter who belongs to the Belgian Luminist current. He was born in 1869 in Courtrai (Kortrijk), Belgium and died in 1954.

== Biography ==
In his early age, Viérin showed an interest for drawing and painting, probably under the influence of his father, an art lover. After joining the Academy of Drawing and Painting in Courtrai at the age of 15, he continued his education at the Royal Academy of Fine Arts in Antwerp, coached by the landscape painter Joseph Coosemans.

In 1894 he went and spent six months in Algeria, experiencing highly luminous landscapes and meeting several artists residing in Biskra and Constantine.

In 1896, he married Marguerite Bataille, with whom he had seven children.

With the help of his brother Joseph, an architect, he built Ter Wilgen, one of the first summer houses in Duinbergen on the Belgian coast. This has been listed as a heritage building. The countryside around was a source of inspiration for several paintings.

During World War I, he sought refuge in Domburg in Holland with his family. After the war he returned to Courtrai, his hometown, where he surrounded himself with many painter and writer friends. The interbellum period (1918–1940) was very important in his artistic career. He became a prominent figure in the local cultural life. He headed the Academy of Fine Arts as well as the Archeological and Fine Arts Museum in Courtrai.

He died at the age of 84, three years after his wife.

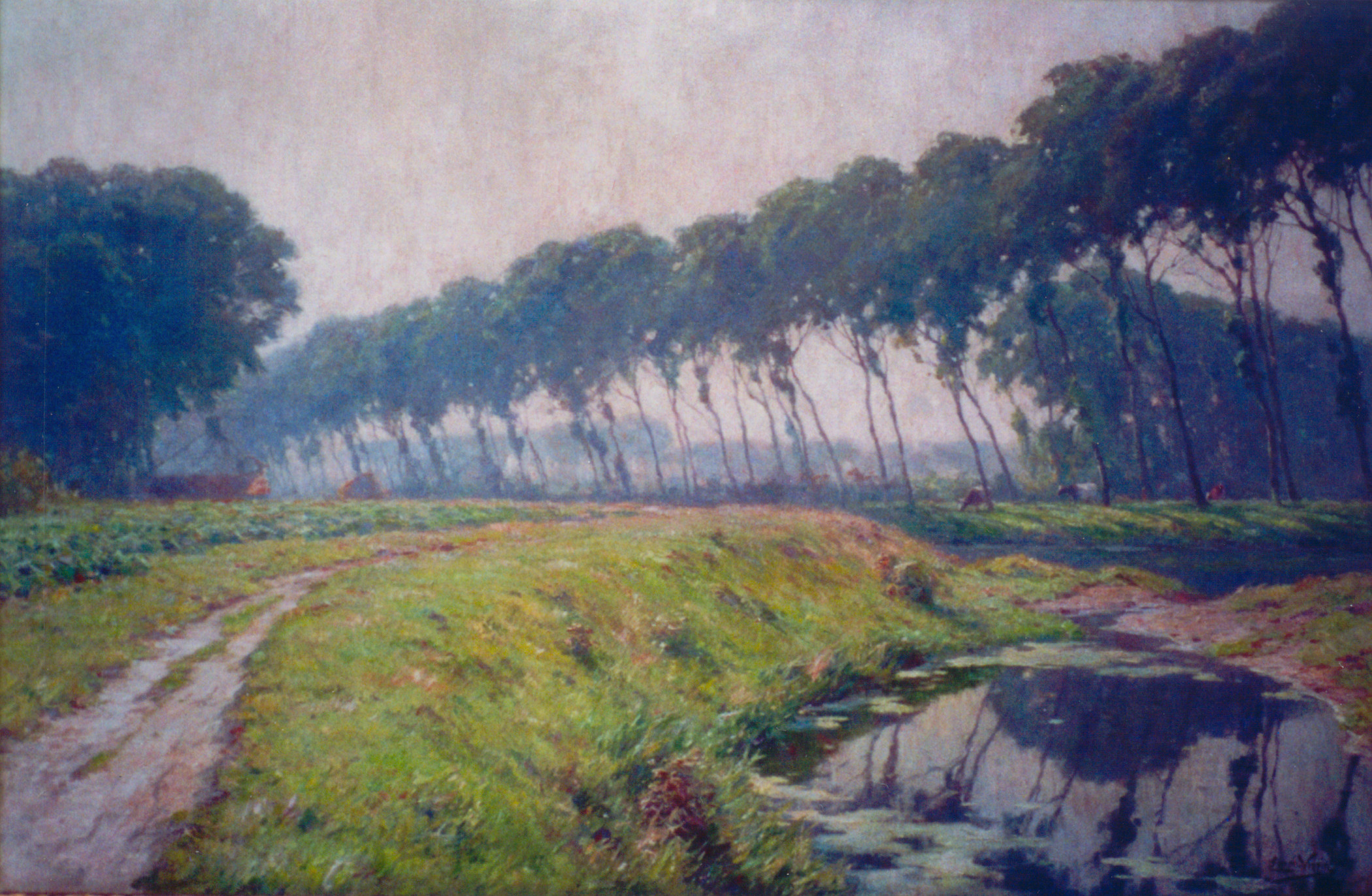
Strobrugge (1910)

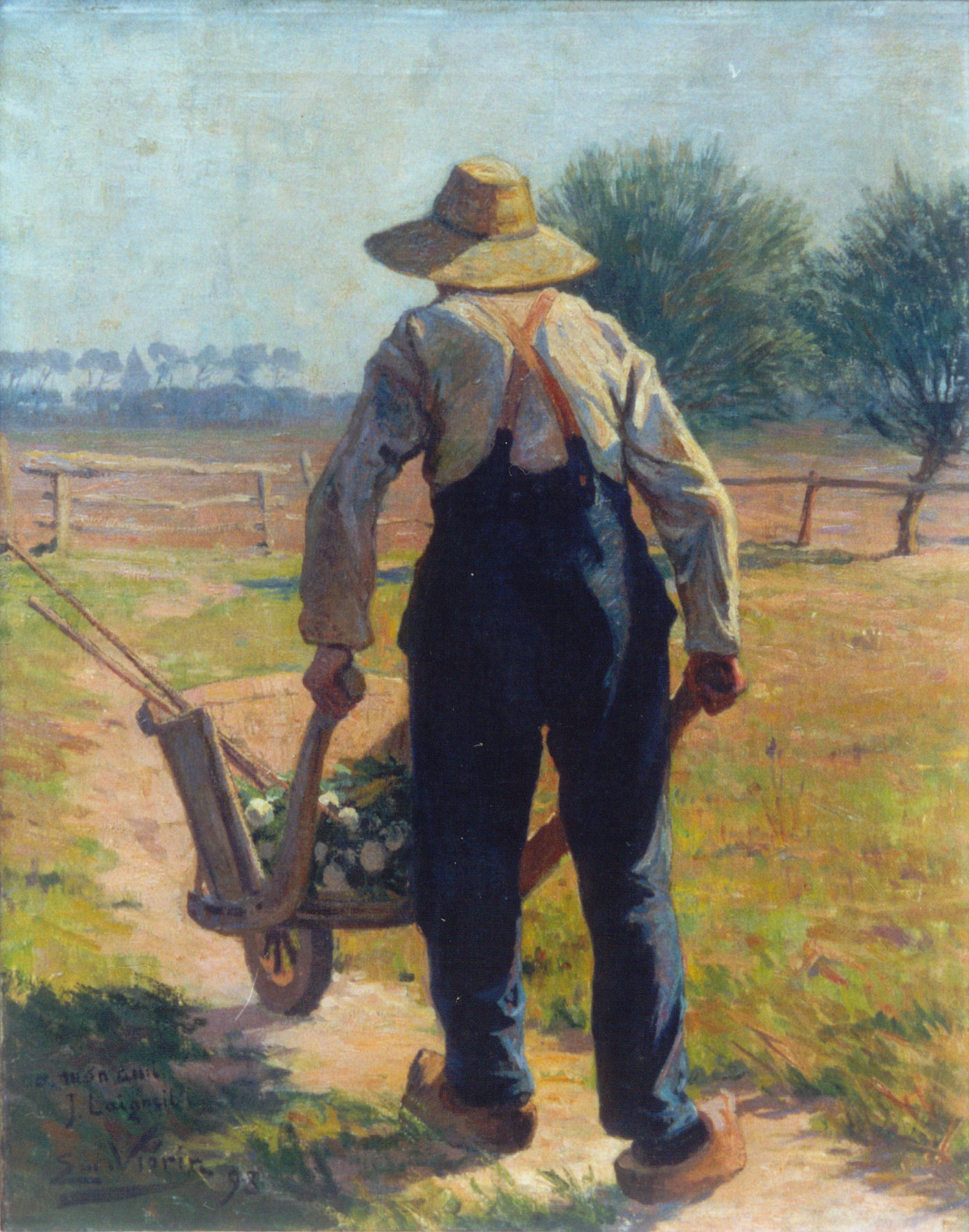
Paysan avec brouette (1893)

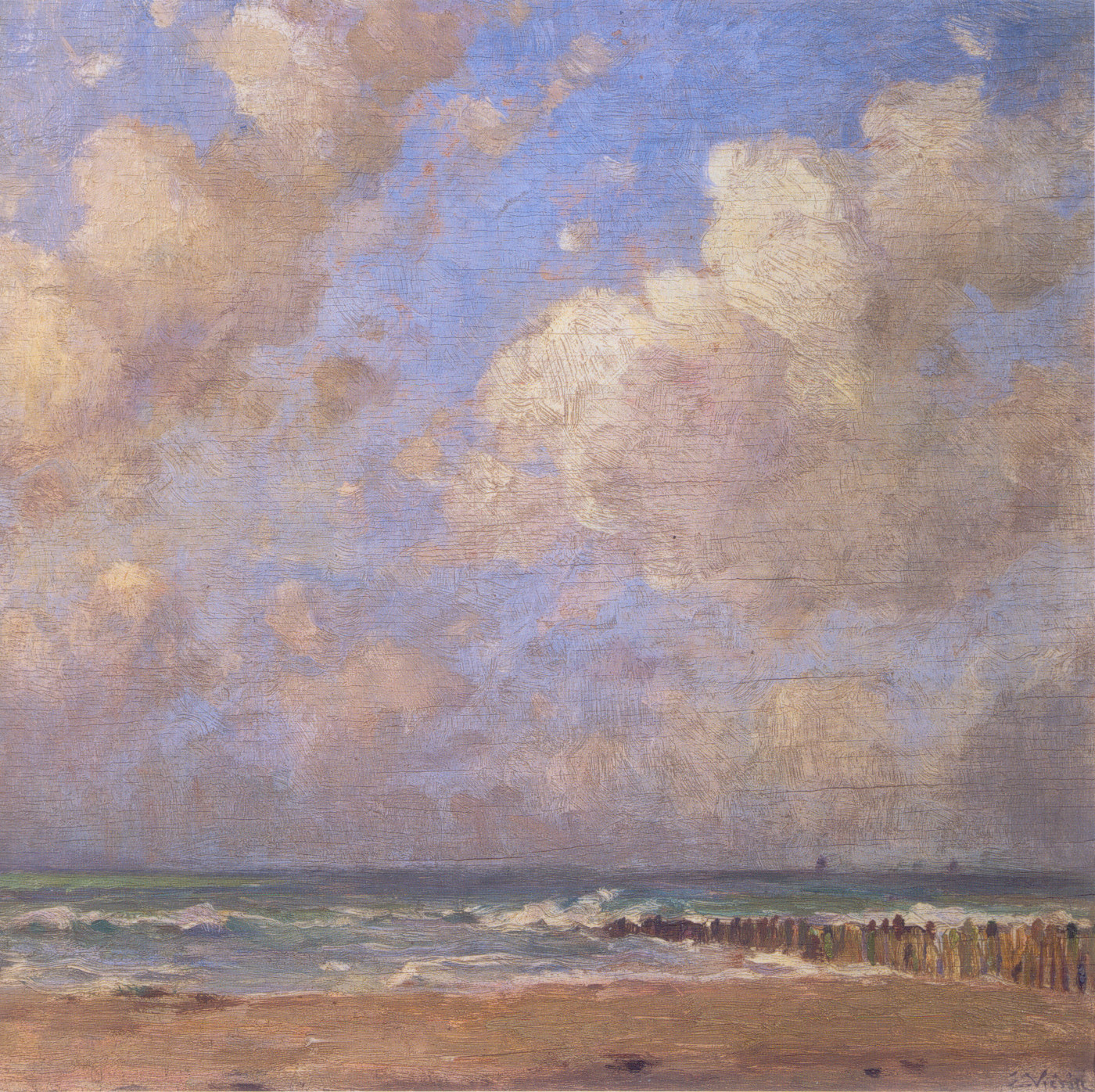
Marine ensoleillée, Domburg (1917)

== Work ==
Viérin's works until the mid-1890s are of a realist style in line with those of the Barbizon and Tervueren schools of that time. From then on his style evolved towards Luminism, an artistic current influenced by French Impressionism. Emile Claus was a highly appreciated figure at its forefront. Despite a twenty-year age difference between the two, Claus maintained a friendly relationship with the young Viérin, encouraging him to go and paint Flanders’ seaside light and landscapes.

In his luminist works, Viérin includes a touch of intimism, contemplation and sometimes melancholy.

The subjects of his works were mainly landscapes, beguinages, seascapes, beaches and dunes, windmills, farms, village houses and streets. Not unusually he painted the same subject at different hours of the day or in different seasons.

After World War I, encouraged by clients and collectors, he kept painting in the same style, ignoring the new evolving expressionist and abstract styles.

A 192-page monograph, Emmanuel Viérin: Schilder van het licht = Peintre de la lumière, and a website illustrate many of his works (see "Association Emmanuel Viérin 1869–1954" below).

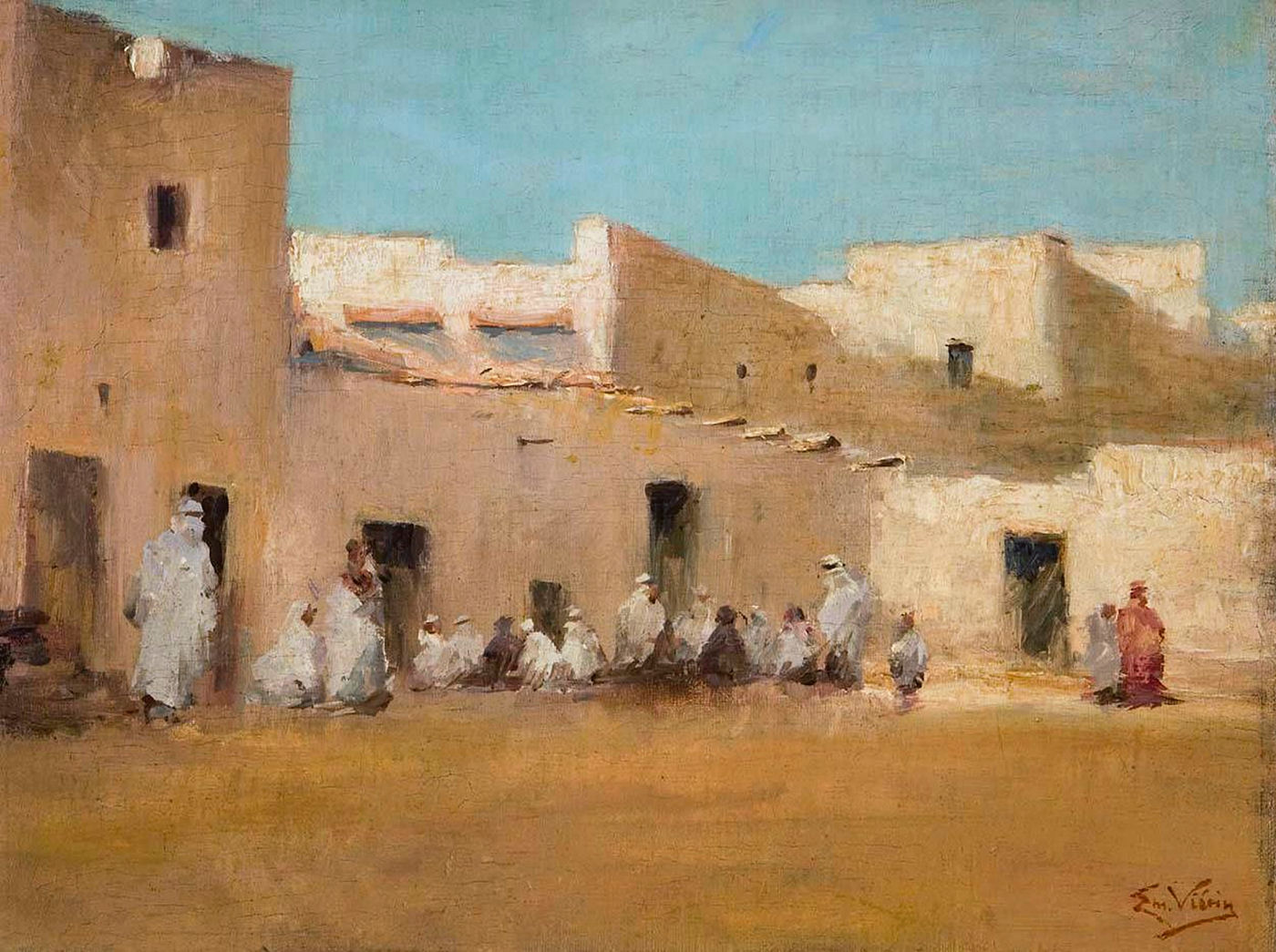
Palabre (1895)

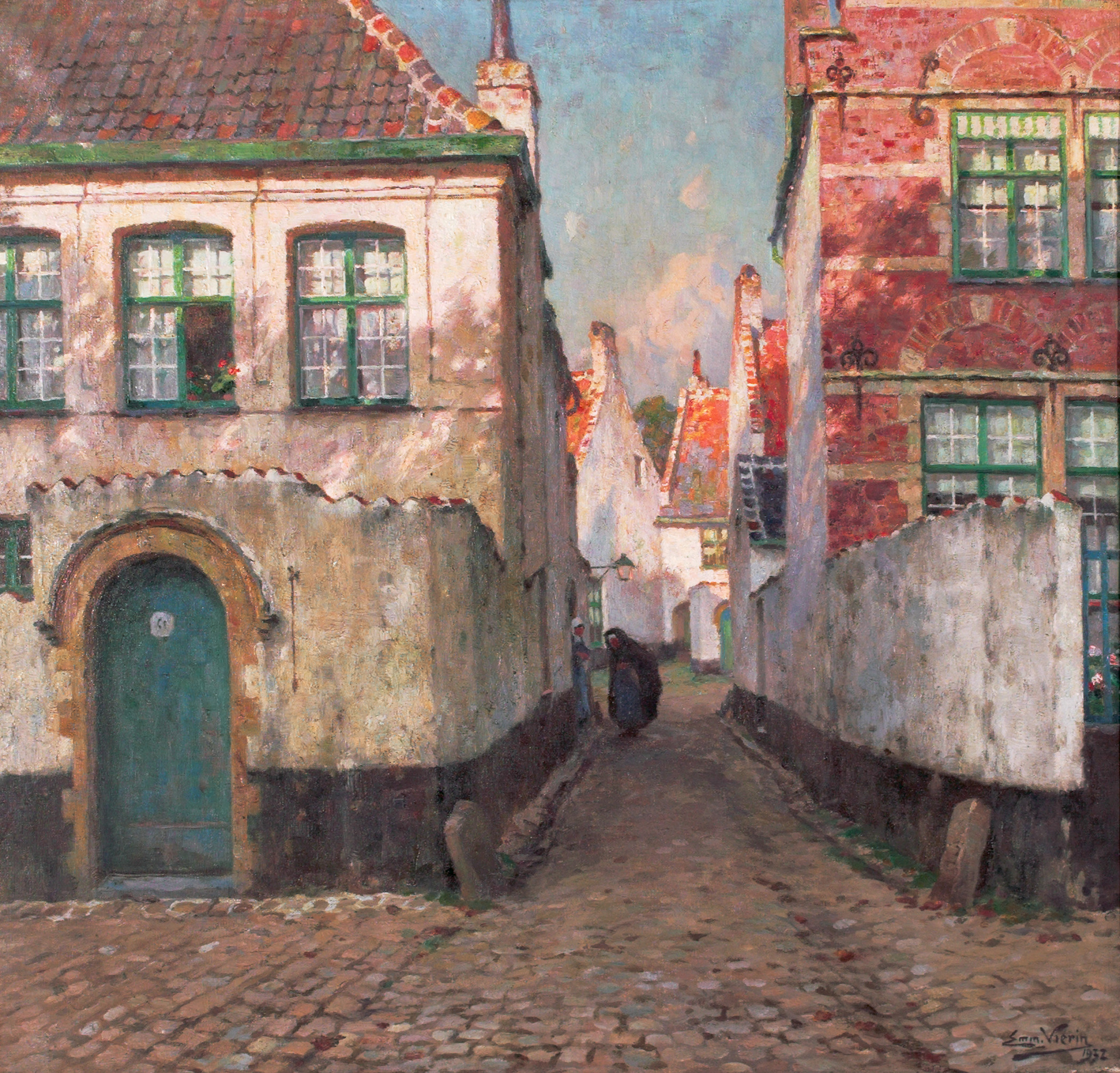
Béguinage à Courtrai (1932)

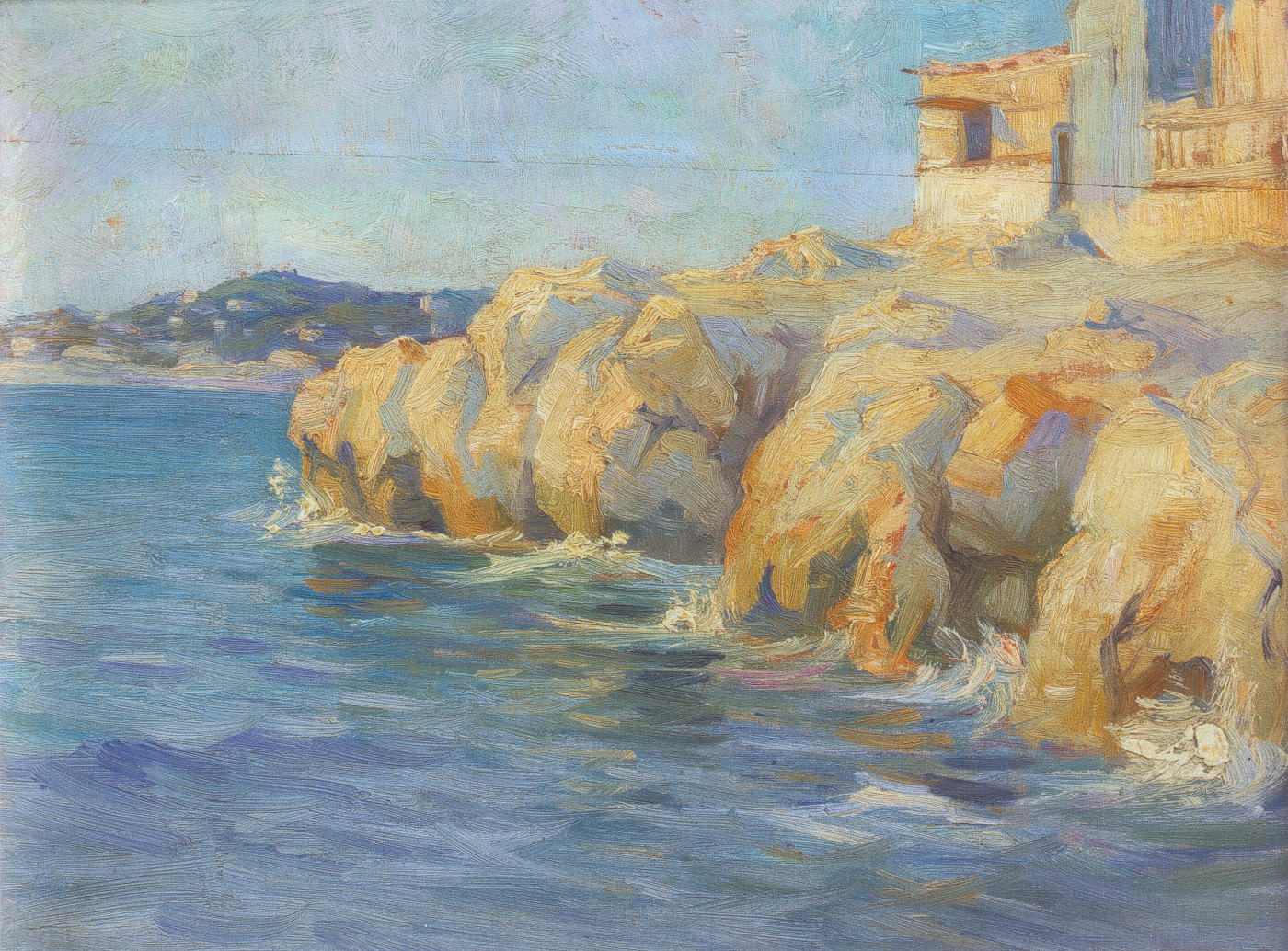
Rochers de la Madrague (1896)

== Exhibitions ==
From 1889 on Emmanuel Viérin took part in innumerable exhibitions in Belgium, either private or within the scope of artistic circles. He was also invited to participate in exhibitions held abroad in places such as Milan, Rome, Venice, Barcelona, Amsterdam, The Hague, Rotterdam, Maastricht, Munich, Oslo, London, Buenos Aires, Lisbon and in the USA (Pittsburgh).

In the 21st century some of his works were shown in exhibitions in Courtrai (2004), Knokke (2007 and 2012), Domburg (2014) and Munich (2022).

== Museums ==
Some of his works can be found in the following museums:

- Groeningemuseum (Bruges, Belgium)
- Museu Nacional d’Art de Catalunya (Barcelona, Spain)
- Musées Royaux des Beaux-Arts (Brussels, Belgium)
- Musée d’Ixelles (Brussels, Belgium)
- Stedelijke Musea (Courtrai, Belgium)
- La Piscine (Roubaix, France)
- Museo d’Arte Moderna (Udine, Italy)
- Koninklijk Museum voor Schone Kunsten (Antwerp, Belgium)
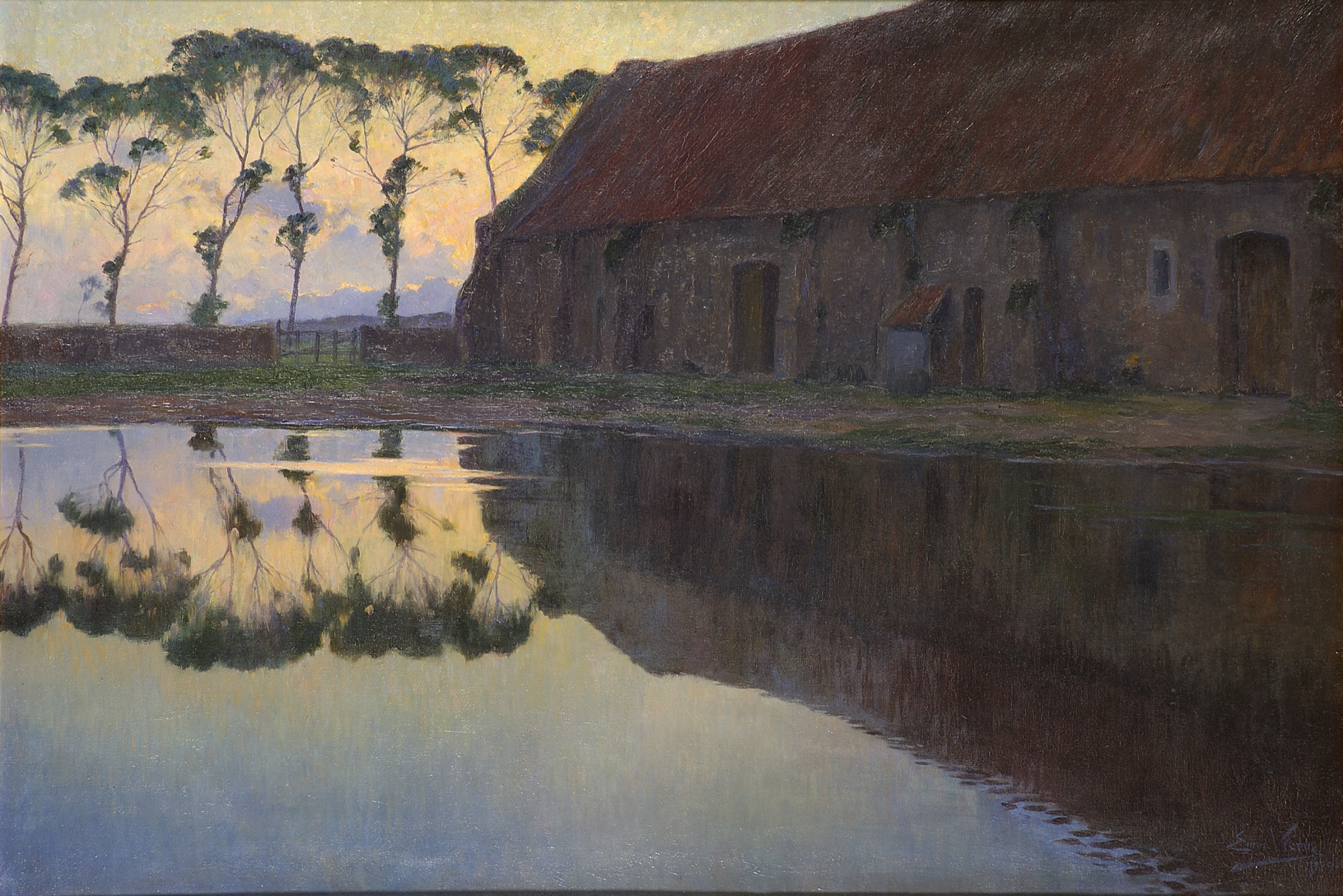
La Vieille Grange (1900), Bruges, Groeningemuseum

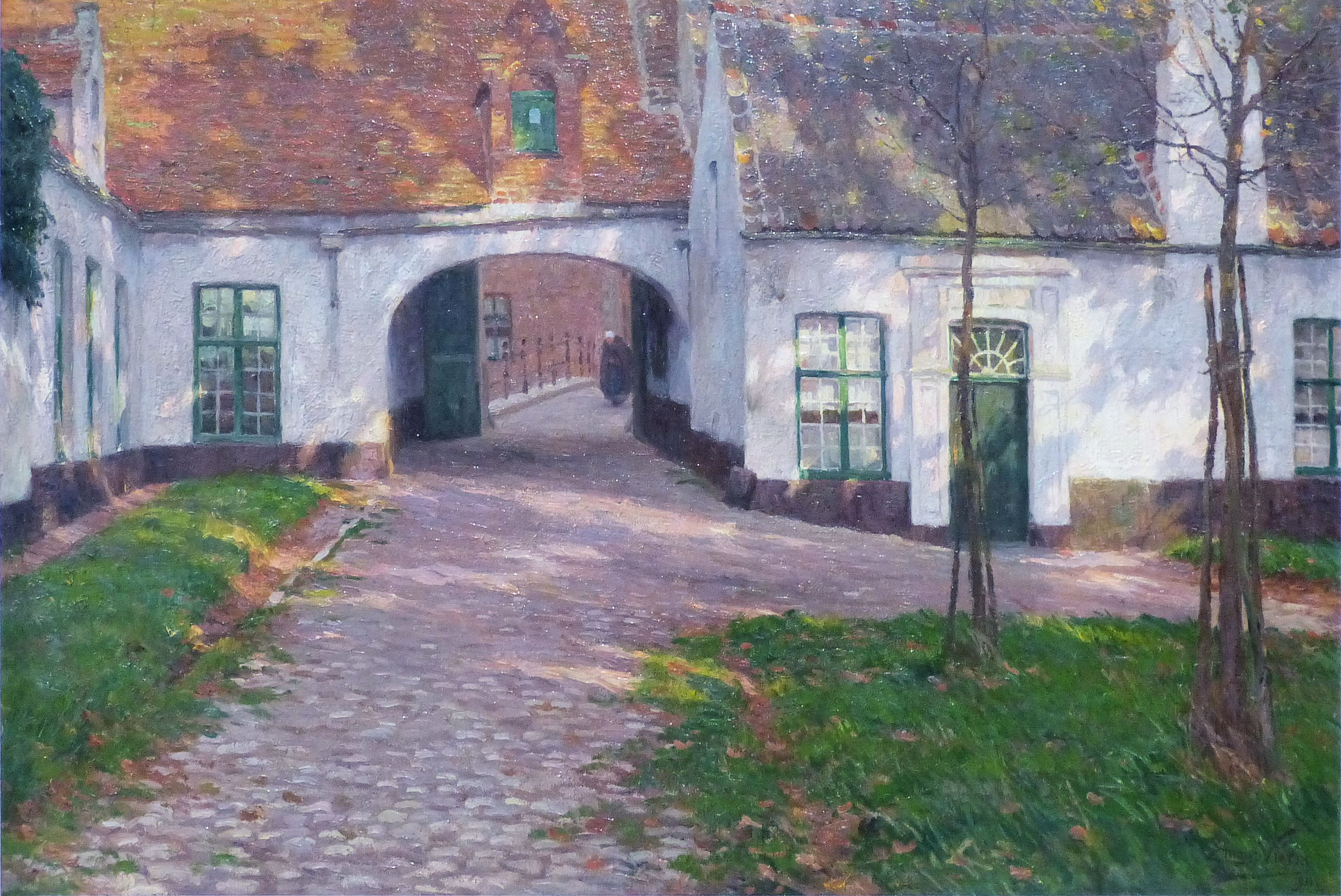
Entrée du béguinage de Bruges (1911)

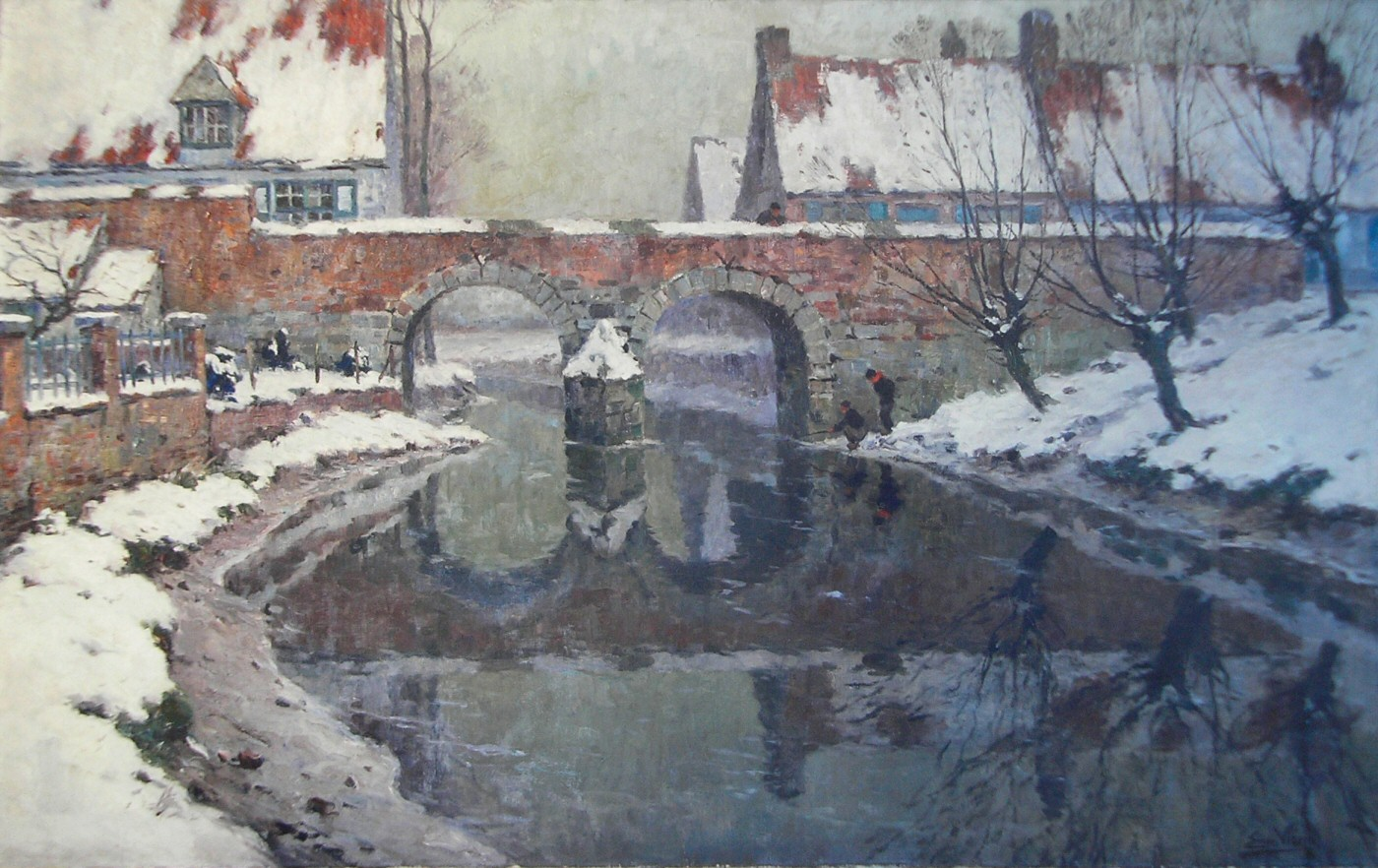
Heule watermolen (1930)

== Association Emmanuel Viérin 1869–1954 ==
It was created in 2002 for the purpose of maintaining the remembrance of the artist.

A major exhibition of his works was held in 2004 in cooperation with the Municipal Museum of Courtrai, the artist’s hometown.

At the same time the Association had a 192-page monograph published by Fonds Mercator. The authors are Johan De Smet and Isabelle De Jaegere.

The Association also maintains a website (emmanuelvierin.be) which includes a catalogue of works known, over 500 as of January 2024. The works are listed by period, subject and location. The website also includes the contents of the monography and the name of a contact person.
