= Love Conquers All (ABC song) =

Single by ABC

from the album Abracadabra
- B-side: "What's Good About Goodbye?"
- Released: 15 July 1991
- Recorded: 1991
- Genre: Synth-pop
- Label: EMI; Parlophone
- Songwriters: Martin Fry; Mark White
- Producers: Martin Fry; Mark White

ABC singles chronology
"The Look of Love '90" (1990)	"Love Conquers All" (1991)	"Say It" (1991)

"Love Conquers All" is a song by the English new wave group ABC, released in July 1991 by EMI and Parlophone as the lead single from their sixth studio album, Abracadabra (1991).

The song's music video, shot mostly in black-and-white, features scenes of various people doing random actions, intercut with footage of Martin Fry and Mark White performing the song and the seahorse from the Abracadabra album cover.

== Critical reception ==
Upon its release, Paul Lester of Melody Maker praised the song as a "sparkling addition to the ABC oeuvre" and described it as "disco as in 'Southern Freeez' or an old Whispers love-thing". He noted the band "continue to face tomorrow with their best foot dancefloorward" and added that the B-side, "What's Good About Goodbye?", "makes me long for that pre-Pixies/Roses, pre-postantirockist time when bands yearned to sound modern and technologically advanced". Sally Margaret Joy of Melody Maker was less enthusiastic in her review, calling the song "merely vapid", with the "only clue to a former glory [being] the upward bubbling of a watery whistle during the verses". She also noted the "pick 'n' mix chocolate box lyrics" that "passed muster" on The Lexicon of Love, but "sound all wrong now". Andrew Collins of NME commented that the song "sounds like ABC would've sounded in 1982 if it had been 1991, if you see what I mean". He added, "It's so slick it just slid off my turntable and then slimed off down the road. No great loss, really."

== Track listing ==
CD/12" single
No.	Title	Length
1.	"Love Conquers All" (7" version)	4:02
2.	"Love Conquers All" (extended version)	6:15
3.	"What's Good About Goodbye?"	4:48
4.	"Love Conquers All" (percapella mix)	4:24

2020 digital download
No.	Title	Length
1.	"Love Conquers All" (7" edit)	4:02
2.	"Love Conquers All" (The Morales "Eclipse" Mix)	5:45
3.	"Love Conquers All" (the Morales mix)	4:42
4.	"Love Conquers All" (Boilerhouse Mix)	4:51
5.	"Love Conquers All" (percapella mix)	4:24
6.	"Love Conquers All" (extended version)	6:17

== Charts ==
Chart (1991)	Peak position
Germany (Official German Charts)	36
Switzerland (Schweizer Hitparade)	22
UK Singles (OCC)	47
UK Airplay (Music Week)	23
UK Dance (Music Week)	50
