= Heydemann =

Heydemann is a surname. Notable people with the surname include:

- Christel Heydemann (born 1974), French businesswoman
- Günther Heydemann (1914–1986), German U-boat commander
- Heinrich Heydemann (1842–1889), German philologist and archaeologist
