= Edmund Hoefer =

German writer (1819–1882)

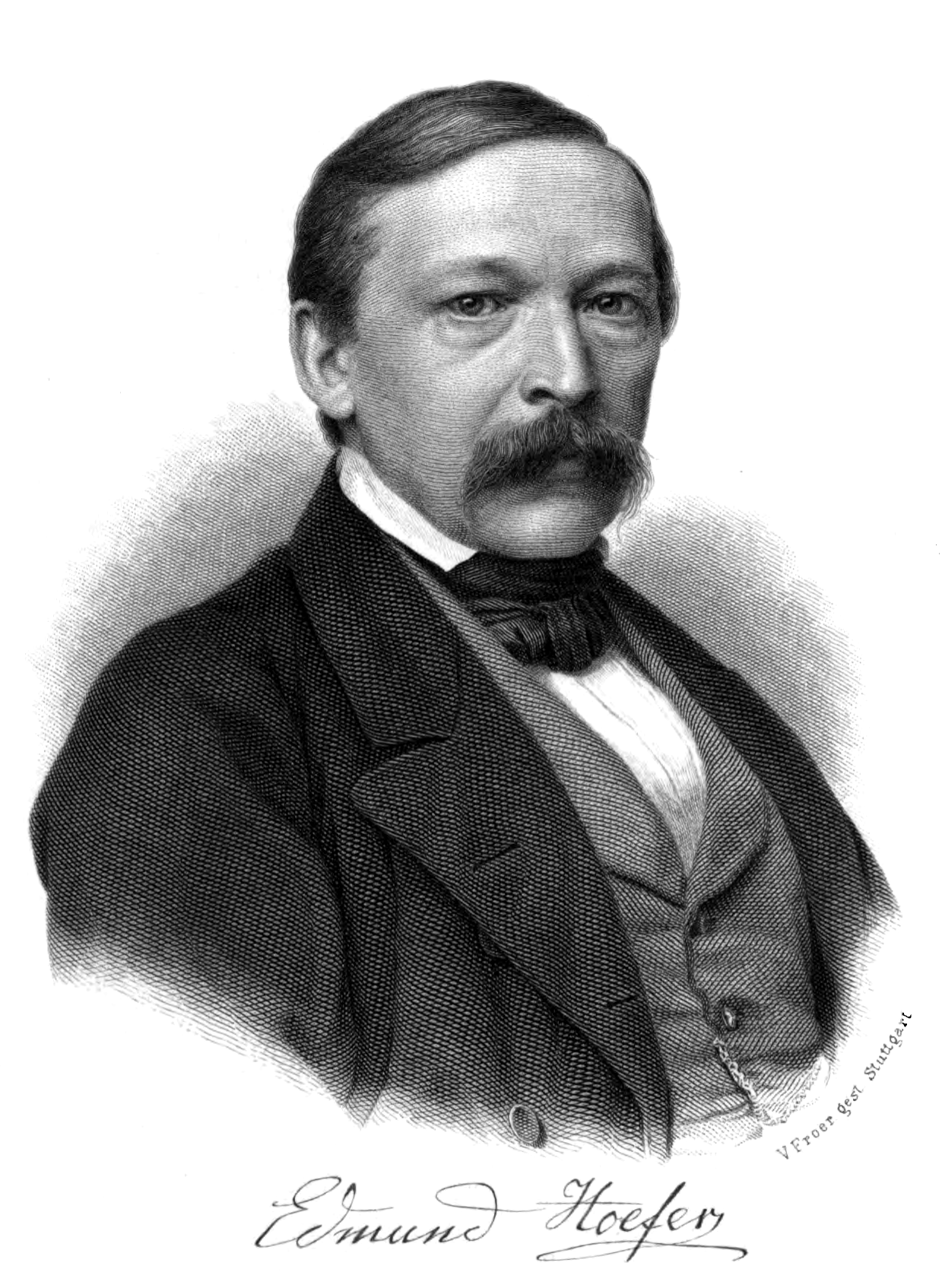
Edmund Hoefer

Edmund Hoefer (15 October 1819, in Greifswald – 22 May 1882, in Cannstatt) was a leading German novelist of the second half of the 19th century and a noted literary historian.

== Biography ==
After graduating from a gymnasium in 1839, he studied philology and history at the universities of Greifswald, Heidelberg and Berlin. He began to write fiction early in life, his first stories appearing in collected form under the title From the People (Aus dem Volk; Stuttgart, 1852), and proving very popular.

They were followed by:

- Out of the Old Time and the New (Aus alter und neuer Zeit; Stuttgart, 1854),
- As the People Speak (Wie das Volk spricht; 1855) was a collection of old proverbial sayings which Hoefer revised and expanded over the years, and an edition appeared in 1876.
- Skizzenbuch aus Norddeutschland, Schwanwiek (1856),
- Bewegtes Leben (1856),
- Days that Are No More (Vergangene Tag; Prague, 1859),
- German Hearts (Deutsche Herzen; Prague, 1860) was widely read.

Of his longer works, the most notable were:

- Norien. Erinnerungen einer alten Frau (Stuttgart, 1858, 2 vols.),
- Der große Baron (1861, 2 vols.),
- Unter der Fremdherrschaft (1863, 3 vols.),
- Tolleneck (1864, 3 vols.),
- Altermann Ryke (1864, 4 vols.) and his
- Low German story Pap Kuhn (1878).
