= Greifswald International Students' Festival =

- Genre: student festival
- Dates: summer
- Locations: Greifswald, Germany
- Years active: 2002, 2005, 2006, 2008, 2010, 2012, 2014, 2016
- Founded: 2001
- Organizer: GrIStuF e.V.
- Website: www.gristuf.org

The Greifswald International Students' Festival is an event organised by the non-profit organisation GrIStuF e.V. and it takes place in the town of Greifswald, which is situated about 200 km to the north of Germany's capital Berlin at the Baltic shore.

The festivals include different activities such as: thematic workshops, lectures, cultural events, exhibitions, parties and concerts. The theme range over political, artistic, social and cultural topics.

== Organizer: GrIStuF e.V. ==
GrIStuF e.V. is a non-profit organisation founded by volunteers to run the Greifswald International Students Festival. It organises other events as well such as the local "running dinner" twice a year, and the local chapter of "Fête de la Musique" once a year since 2007.

== History ==
Inspired by the International Student Week in Ilmenau , a group of enthusiastic students organised the first Greifswald International Students Festival in 2002.

The following festivals took place so far:

- 2002: Our World - Our Choice
- 2005: Touch the world
- 2006: Project U-Rope: Utopia or reality?
- 2008: Mind a change?
- 2010: Response-Ability
- 2012: FACE to FACE - paving the way for a non-violent society
- 2014: Lost in Consumption - Rethinking Economy
- 2016: Sea: The Future - Discovering the Ocean Current
- 2018: Beyond Borders - Where Are Your Limits?
- 2020: From Ego to Echo - Creating Ideas for Collective Change

In 2005, the team formed itself and began planning the second festival. The topics of the festival 2005 included: Green Globalization, Conflicts, Migration, Development Cooperation, Intercultural learning and Bioethics. 271 students from all over the world followed this invitation, which is a bit lower than expected, because some of the participants from non-EU countries had visa problems.

The 2006 festival ran under the motto Project U-rope: Utopia or Reality, and only students from Europe were invited this time. Gesine Schwan was the patroness and sent a video message to the participants. More than 400 participants took part in the festival 2006. The cultural activities included:

- European Night
- Meeting of the Europeans
- Arts & Crafts Market
- Excursions to the Region
- Panel Discussions
- League of Culture
- Several Concerts

The next festival was then held in 2008, in order to avoid competition with the 2007 Ilmenau Festival.
