= Koos (island) =

Island in the Greifswalder bay, Germany

Coordinates: 54°10′N 13°25′E

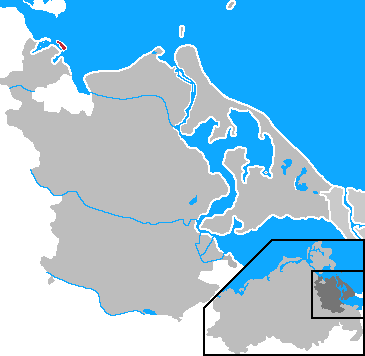
Location of Koos (red) in former Ostvorpommern district, Mecklenburg-Vorpommern

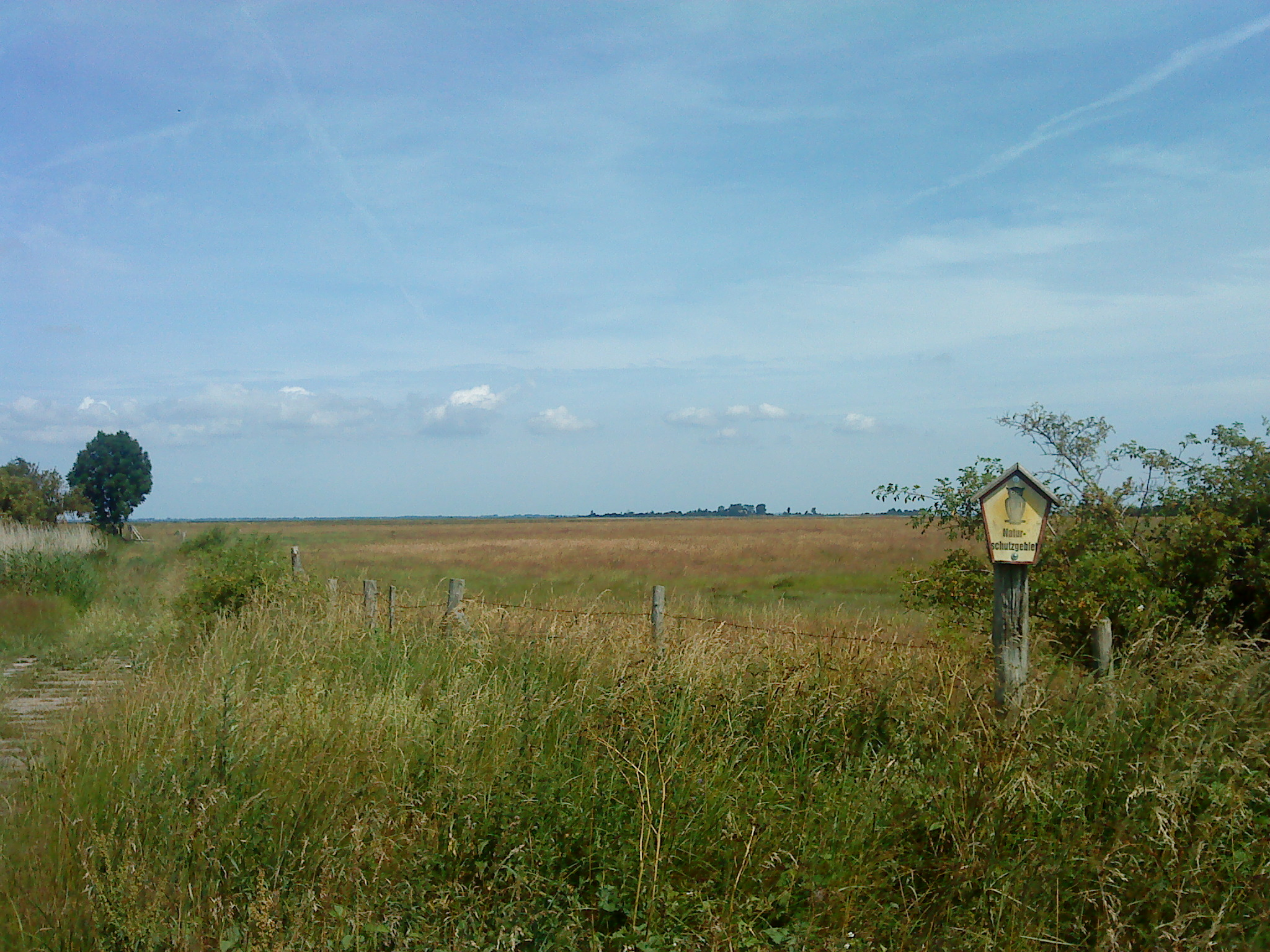
View over the Kooser Wiesen ("Koos meadows", on the mainland) towards Koos (marked by the group of trees in the center). The yellow sign showing an owl indicates the area's status as a protected nature reserve.

Koos (German pronunciation: [koːs]) is the largest of several small islands in the Bay of Greifswald, Mecklenburg-Vorpommern, Germany. It has an area of 149 hectares and a maximum elevation of just above three meters. The island is a largely uninhabited natural reserve with restricted access. It is separated from the mainland by Kooser Bucht and Kooser See, two bays connected by a tiny strait, Beek.

In 1241, Barnuta, prince of Rügen, granted Koos (then "Chosten") to Eldena abbey (then "Hilda"), later it became a possession of the Hanseatic town of Greifswald, located a few kilometers southward. A medieval burgh has been suggested on the isle, but not verified. A 17th-century Dutch settlement had disappeared in the 18th century. Koos is administered by the nearby town of Greifswald.
