= Franz-Robert Liskow =

German politician (born 1987)

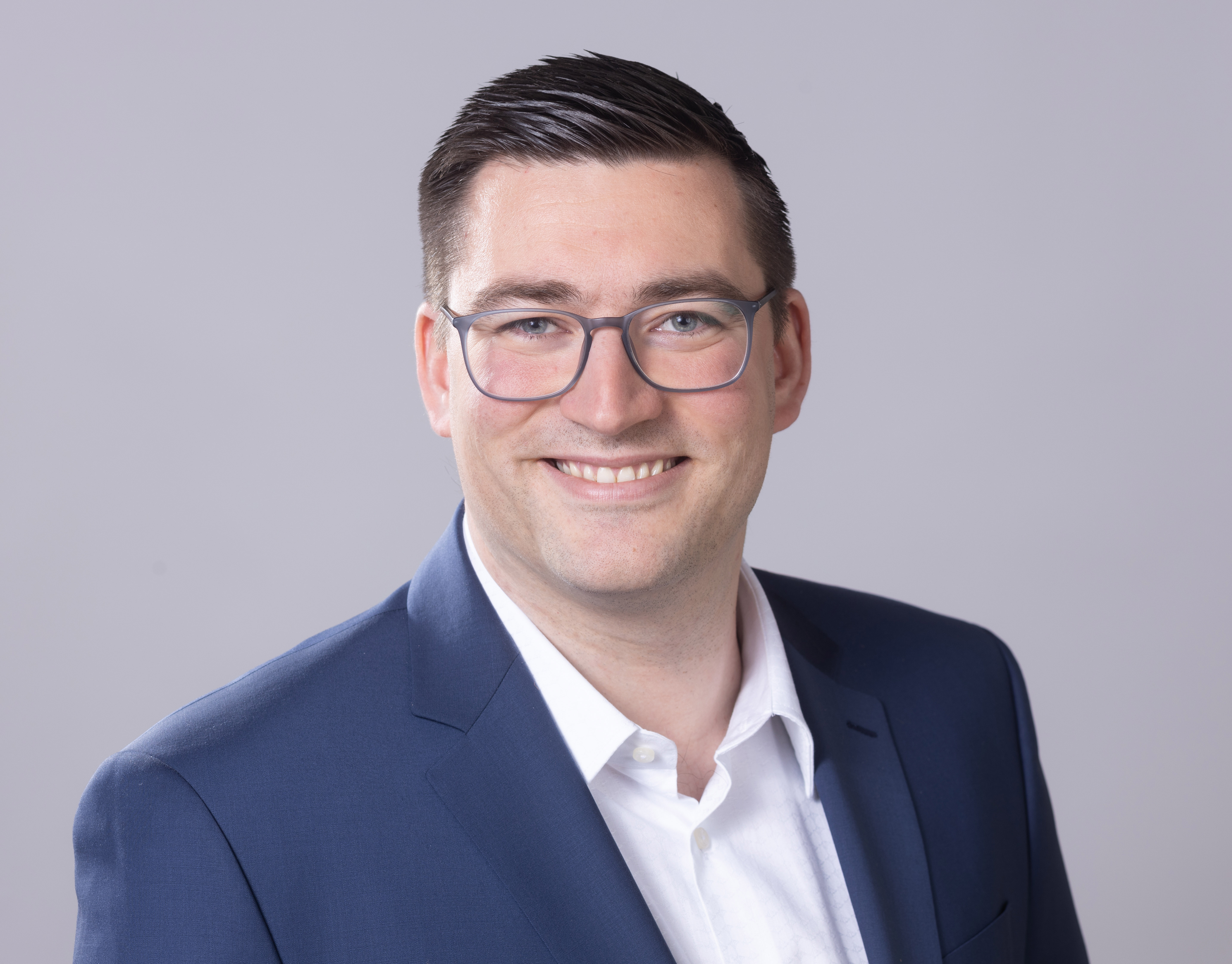
- Liskow in 2021

Member of the Landtag of Mecklenburg-Vorpommern
- Incumbent
- Assumed office 4 October 2016

Personal details
- Born: 20 May 1987 (age 38) Greifswald
- Party: Christian Democratic Union (since 2002)
- Parent: Egbert Liskow (father)

Franz-Robert Liskow (born 20 May 1987 in Greifswald) is a German politician serving as a member of the Landtag of Mecklenburg-Vorpommern since 2016. From 2012 to 2018, he served as chairman of the Young Union in Mecklenburg-Vorpommern.
