= Heinrich Heydemann =

German classical archaeologist

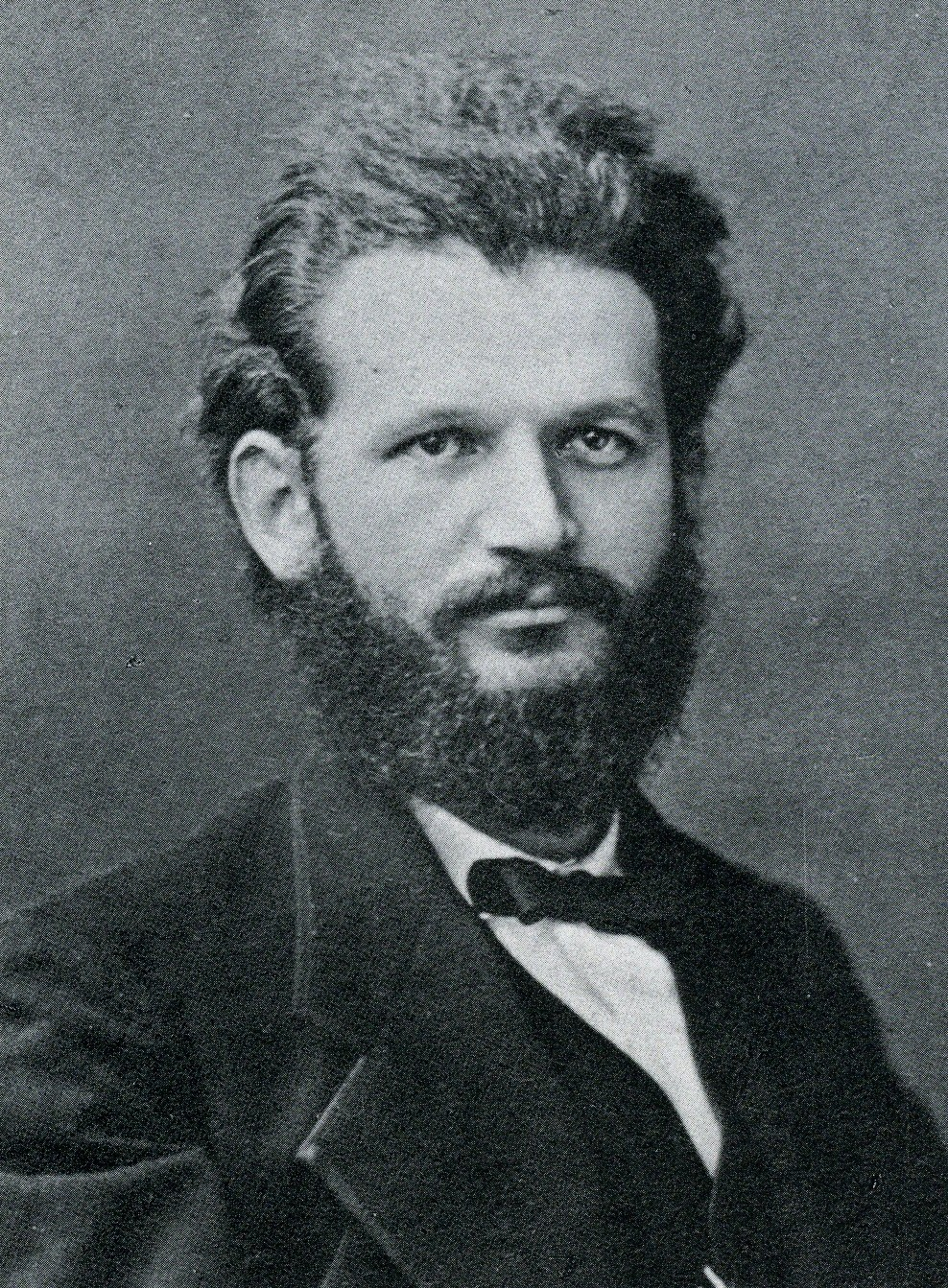
- Born: 28 August 1842; Greifswald, Germany
- Died: 10 October 1889 (aged 47); Halle an der Saale, Germany
- Known for: Studies of Greek and Roman vases Editor of Archäologischen Zeitung

Academic background
- Education: University of Tübingen; University of Bonn; University of Greifswald; University of Berlin (Ph.D., 1865)
- Thesis: (1865)
- Doctoral advisor: Eduard Gerhard (influence)

Heinrich Heydemann (28 August 1842, in Greifswald – 10 October 1889, in Halle an der Saale) was a German classical philologist and archaeologist, largely known for his studies of Greek and Roman vases.

He studied classical philology and archaeology at the universities of Tübingen, Bonn, Greifswald and Berlin, receiving his doctorate at the latter institution in 1865. While a student, his influences were philologist Conrad Bursian, art historian Anton Springer and archaeologist Eduard Gerhard. Following graduation, he spent several years in Greece and Italy, devoting himself mainly to the study of ancient vases. In 1869 he obtained his habilitation for archaeology at the University of Berlin, and in 1873 became a directorial assistant at the Antiquarium of the Royal Museum in Berlin.

In 1874 he was named an associate professor of archaeology at the University of Halle, where in 1882 he attained a full professorship. For a number of years he was editor of the publication Archäologischen Zeitung.

== Selected works ==
- Humoristische vasenbilder aus Unteritalien, 1870 – Humorous vase images from southern Italy.
- Griechische Vasenbilder, 1870 – Greek vase paintings.
- Die antiken Marmor-Bildwerke, 1874 – Ancient marble sculptures.
- Die Knöchelspielerin im Palazzo Colonna zu Rom, 1877 – The knöchelspielerin in the Palazzo Colonna at Rome.
- Mittheilungen aus den antikensammlungen in Ober- und Mittelitalien, 1879 – On antique collections in northern and central Italy.
- Gigantomachie auf einer Vase aus Altamura, 1880 – Gigantomachia on a vase from Altamura.
- Terracotten aus dem Museo Nazionale zu Neapel, 1882 – Terracottas at the Museo Nazionale in Naples.
- Alexander der Grosse und Dareios kodomannos auf unteritalischen Vasenbildern, 1883 – Alexander the Great and Darius III depicted on vases from southern Italy.
- Vase Caputi mit Theaterdarstellungen, 1884 – Vase Caputi with theater representations.
- Dionysos' Geburt und Kindheit, 1885 – Dionysus' birth and childhood.
