= Capriccio (music) =

Virtuosic piece of classical music

A capriccio or caprice (sometimes plural: caprices, capri or, in Italian, capricci), is a piece of music, usually fairly free in form and of a lively character. The typical capriccio is one that is fast, intense, and often virtuosic in nature.

The term has been applied in disparate ways, covering works using many different procedures and forms, as well as a wide variety of vocal and instrumental forces. The earliest occurrence of the term was in 1561 by Jacquet de Berchem and applied to a set of madrigals. In the late 16th and early 17th centuries, it could refer to madrigals, music intended alternatively for voices or instruments, or strictly instrumental pieces, especially keyboard compositions.

== Examples ==
- Charles-Valentin Alkan: Capriccio alla soldatesca (1859)
- Fikret Amirov: Azerbaijan Capriccio (1961)
- Ludwig van Beethoven: Rondo a Capriccio Op.129 (in the style of a capriccio)
- Johann Sebastian Bach: Capriccio on the departure of a beloved brother. Partita no. 2 in C minor BWV 826, mvt. 6
- Johannes Brahms: Capriccio in B minor (1878)
- George Frideric Handel: Capriccio in G minor (HWV 483)
- Leoš Janáček: Capriccio (1926)
- György Ligeti: Due capricci (1947)
- Pietro Locatelli: capricci for solo violin in L'arte del violino (1733)
- Felix Mendelssohn: Rondo Capriccioso (1830), Capriccio Brillant (1832)
- Niccolò Paganini: 24 Caprices for Solo Violin (1802–17)
- Krzysztof Penderecki: Capriccio for Violin and Orchestra (1967)
- Walter Piston: Capriccio for Harp and String Orchestra (1963)
- Nikolai Rimsky-Korsakov: Capriccio Espagnol (1887)
- Camille Saint-Saëns: Caprice sur des airs danois et russes (1887)
- Igor Stravinsky: Capriccio for Piano and Orchestra (1929)
- Francisco Tárrega: Capricho árabe (1892)
- Pyotr Ilyich Tchaikovsky: Capriccio Italien (1880)
- William Walton: Capriccio burlesco (1968)
- Jan Dismas Zelenka: Capriccio in F major (ZWV 184)
- Sylvius Leopold Weiss Capriccio in D Major for Lute (1715)
