= Estudio en forma de minueto =

- by Francisco Tárrega
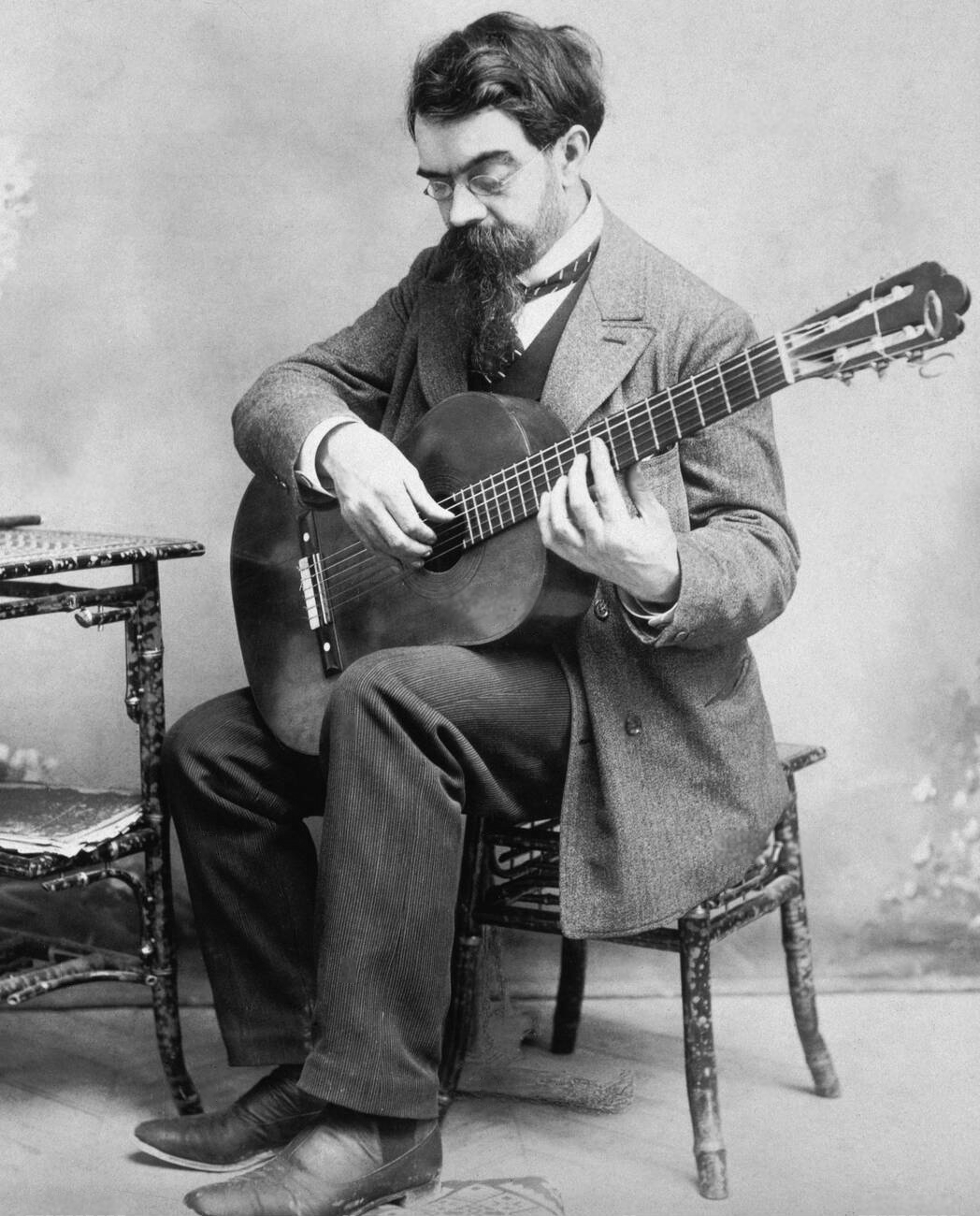
- Tárrega pictured c. 1900
- English: Study in the Form of a Minuet
- Key: A major
- Composed: 26 September 1906: Barcelona
- Scoring: Solo guitar

Estudio en forma de minueto (English: Study in the Form of a Minuet), sometimes incorrectly named Estudio en forma de minuetto, is an etude for guitar by Spanish guitarist Francisco Tárrega.

== Composition and analysis ==
Francisco Tárrega produced a large number of compositions and arrangements for solo guitar as pieces to be performed only for personal purposes. This etude was finished while living in Barcelona on September 29, 1906. It was dedicated to Consuelo Pascual de Bordum and was later published by Vidal Llimona y Boceta. The whole piece, which consists of only one major section, is in A major. Given that Tárrega's compositions were personal divertimentos at the time, it has been published many times over in different collections and has been given different catalogue numbers. However, no definitive cataloging system has been established for any of Tárrega's compositions.

== Notable recordings ==
The following is a list of notable performances of this composition:

Guitarist	Record Company	Year of Recording	Format
Narciso Yepes	Deutsche Grammophon	1982	CD

== See also ==
- List of compositions by Francisco Tárrega
