= Chris Freeman =

Chris Freeman may refer to:

== Musicians ==
- Chris Freeman (Australian musician) (c. 1950 – 1992), Australian classical and flamenco multi-instrumentalist
- Chris Freeman (musician) (born 1961), American bassist, founding member of Pansy Division
- Chris Freeman, British keyboardist/percussionist, former member of the band Manchester Orchestra
- Chris Hawkins Freeman, singer with The Hinsons (1974–1981) and The Freemans

== Other people ==
- Christopher Freeman (1921–2010), English economist
- Chris Freeman (scientist), British environmental scientist
