= Josefina Robledo Gallego =

Spanish guitarist (1897–1972)

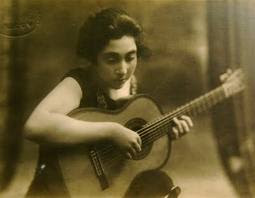
- Born: 10 May 1897; Valencia, Spain
- Died: 25 May 1972 (aged 75); Godella, Spain
- Occupation: Guitarist
- Known for: Main disseminator of the Tàrrega school in Brazil
- Spouse: Ricardo García de Vargas

Josefina Robledo Gallego (Valencia, 10 May 1897 – Godella, 25 May 1972) was a Spanish guitarist who performed extensively around Valencia and in South America and became the main disseminator of the Tàrrega school in Brazil. She was a pioneer in her genre, paving the way for future generations of guitarists, especially women. Although she did not compose works, she transcribed the works of classical composers such as Mendelssohn, Beethoven and Chopin.

== Biography ==
Josefina Robledo Gallego was born in Valencia on 10 May 1897. She was an early disciple of the renowned Spanish guitarist Francisco de Asís Tàrrega y Eixea, and began her musical career in her youth. In 1907, when she was only 10 years old, she gave her first concert at the Valencia Conservatory, and soon her concert career took her to different Spanish cities, achieving fame in the region of her hometown. In 1912, at 15, she traveled to Argentina where she had great success, extending her stay until 1915, when she began a tour of Uruguay, Paraguay and Brazil. At only 18 years old, the guitarist decided to settle down and work as a classical guitar teacher in Sao Paulo and then in Rio de Janeiro, becoming the main disseminator of the Tàrrega school in Brazil.

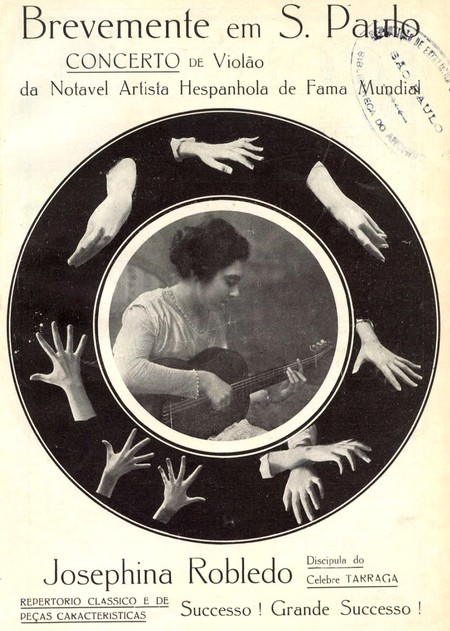
Brazilian performance poster, 1917

The Spanish critic, researcher and musicologist, Eduardo López-Chávarri, described Josefina Robledo as an instrumentalist who was as accomplished as her contemporary, Andrés Segovia, another Spanish guitarist.

In Brazil, Josefina Robledo, along with her two contemporaries, the Brazilian guitarist Américo Jacomino and the Paraguayan guitarist Agustín Barrios, attracted the attention of Brazilian critics in the 1910s and 1920s, and they performed frequently on tours throughout the country. Because of this, the three played a fundamental role in the development of the instrumental guitar in Brazil, influencing future generations of musicians, and promoting this instrument in classical music, which until then had been considered an instrument of lesser importance in classical venues.

=== Retirement ===
After her marriage to Ricardo García de Vargas in 1927, an artistic chronicler of Godella, Spain, she abandoned her concert career, later saying, her "retirement was always voluntary." However, she never stopped rehearsing, limiting her performances to meetings with friends or in sporadic concerts, always in homage to her teacher Tárrega. She made an exception on 20 November 1952 for an anniversary concert to celebrate the centenary of Tárrega's birth, where she performed together with Pepita Roca, Daniel Fortea and Emilio Pujol. She also performed on 15 December 1959 at the Valencia Conservatory, organized by the Society of Friends of the Guitar to commemorate the 50th anniversary of the death of her teacher.

She died in Godella, Spain, on 25 May 1972, at the age of 80.

=== Legacy ===
Around 1979, her husband donated one of his works of art to the Caja de Ahorros de Valencia to raise funds to create prizes: one dedicated to the historical study of the Godella region and another to the memory of Josefina Robledo. Thus, the “Josefina Robledo guitarist music competition" was born. The competition was inaugurated in 1979 and took place annually until 1987. In 2009 it was reopened in an international version.
