= Oremus (disambiguation) =

Oremus is a call to prayer.

Oremus may also refer to:

- Orémus (grape), former name of Zéta, a Hungarian wine grape used in the production of Tokaji
- Oremus (Tárrega), a prelude in D minor for classical guitar by composer Francisco Tárrega
- Mirko Oremuš (born 1988), Croatian professional footballer
- Stephen Oremus (born 1971), American musician
- Orémus Press Newspaper, monthly print newspaper for traditional Catholic families, founded November 2010 at Dover, Oklahoma, USA

== See also ==
- Ormus, a 10th to 17th-century kingdom in the Persian Gulf
