= Caprice sur des airs danois et russes =

Chamber music work by Camille Saint-Saëns

- Chamber music by Camille Saint-Saëns
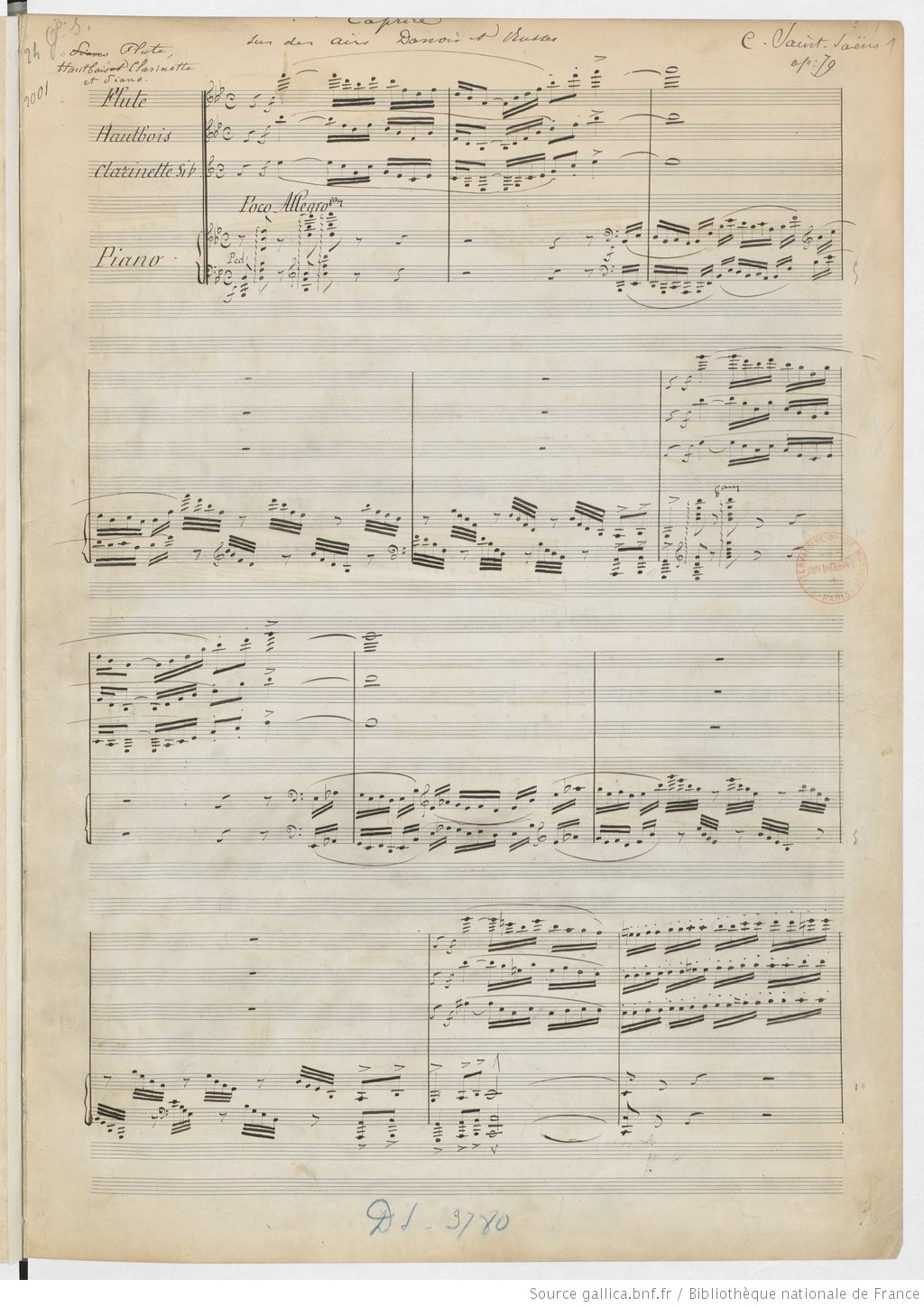
- First page of the manuscript
- Key: B♭ major
- Opus: 79
- Composed: 1887
- Dedication: Maria Feodorovna
- Published: September 1887 (Durand)
- Movements: 1
- Scoring: flute; oboe; clarinet; piano

Premiere
- Date: 21 April 1887
- Location: Saint Petersburg

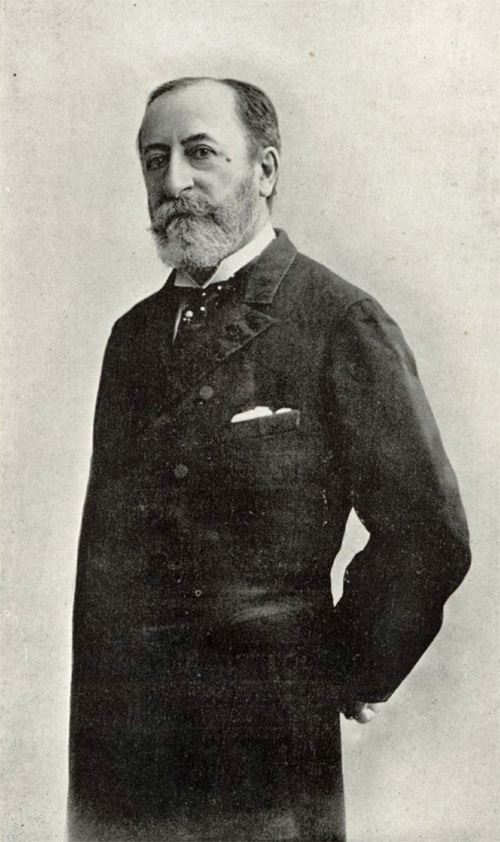
Saint-Saëns c. 1880

The Caprice sur des airs danois et russes (Caprice on Danish and Russian Airs), Op. 79, is a caprice for flute, oboe, clarinet and piano, composed by Camille Saint-Saëns in 1887. The inspiration for using Danish and Russian airs can be linked to the dedicatee Maria Feodorovna, a Danish princess who became Empress of Russia in 1881 as the spouse of Alexander III.

== History ==
In 1887, Saint-Saëns was engaged by the French Red Cross for seven Easter concerts in Russia with the Imperial Opera Orchestra. He invited flutist Paul Taffanel, oboist Georges Gillet and clarinetist Charles Turban to come with him, and wrote the Caprice sur des airs danois et russes specially for them, just before leaving Paris.

The premiere took place on 21 April 1887 in Saint Petersburg, with the composer on the piano. The highlight of the concerts was reportedly the Caprice, though the programs also included various piano pieces by Saint-Saëns and ballet music from his operas, as well as his works for flute and orchestra (Tarantelle, Romance, and Prélude du Déluge), oboe solos by Handel, Gillet and Diémer, and clarinet works by Weber, Mozart and Saint-Saëns.

On the first day there was a gala evening, attended by grand dukes, grand duchesses and princes of the court. On the third day the theaters re-opened and claimed the best of the performers. Then the snow, which had held off until then, began to fall. In that enormous hall the audience caught cold and did not come again. Nevertheless the concerts had become very fashionable; for the first time the audience had applauded solos on the flute, clarinet and oboe, instruments that it was unusual to hear played on their own.

— Jean Bonnerot

Anton Rubinstein, at that time director of the Saint Petersburg Conservatory, was reportedly so impressed that he made all the wind students attend the final concert in Saint Petersburg on 26 April, so they could "get some idea of exactly what could be achieved on these instruments".

After two more concerts in Moscow, the four musicians returned to Paris, though they would again present the work in London in June that year.

Saint-Saëns would give another performance of the work on 31 August 1904 in Rio de Janeiro, together with Pedro de Assis, Agostinho Gouvéa, and Francisco Nunes.

=== Publication history ===
On 17 April 1887, a few days before the premiere, Saint-Saëns wrote to his publisher Durand: "We rehearsed the caprice for Flute, Oboe, Clarinet and Piano. Do not engrave it yet, I will make some modifications. No need to hurry." After the premiere, he wrote on 30 April: "At first the quartet was so popular that I didn't dare to change anything but minor details." The work was finally published in September that year.

Saint-Saëns did not wish for the work to be arranged in different instrumentation, writing to Durand on 30 November 1889: "I refuse to arrange the Russian piece, and I would not like it to be arranged. On reflection, I became convinced that it would become insipid, deprived of the instruments for which it was made." Nevertheless, A. Benfeld, a close friend and admirer of Saint-Saëns who was also known as Albert Kopff, made an arrangement for two pianos which was published in January 1896, and performed by Juliette Toutain and Louise Lhote at a Société d'art concert in Salle Pleyel on 20 December that year.

== Structure ==
Caprice sur des airs danois et russes
Performed by Felix Skowronek (flute), Laila Storch (oboe), William McColl (clarinet) and Neal O'Doan (piano)

The work consists of a single movement, taking approximately 11 minutes to perform. Structurally, it can be divided into three distinct sections: an introduction, a Danish air with variations, and two Russian airs with variations and a coda. Each of the three themes is introduced by a different wind instrument.

=== Analysis ===
The Caprice begins with a virtuosic introduction, featuring fast-running scales and arpeggios:

The end of the introduction is marked by a grand pause, after which the Danish air (Theme A) is introduced in a flute solo over piano accompaniment in measure 38:

The theme is immediately repeated by the oboe. A set of four variations on Theme A follow, in the format of "successively quicker figuration". A brief piano interlude, once again ending in a grand pause, marks the transition to the Russian airs.

The first Russian air (Theme B), marked Moderato ad libitum, is introduced by a lyric oboe solo over piano accompaniment in measure 122:

A clarinet solo immediately repeats the theme. A new section, marked Allegro vivace, begins with the piano playing a fast-moving sixteenth note accompaniment. A clarinet solo introduces the second Russian air (Theme C) in measure 159:

The variations on the Russian themes are different in style compared to the Danish variations. The first variation of Theme B is a brilliant rendition with octave jumps and thick chords in the piano, also incorporating elements from the Introduction. A reprise of Theme C is followed by three distinct variations: the first variation features a triplet rhythm in the wind instruments, while the piano plays the theme, the second is a canon, and the third is based on the second half of the theme, also being featured in the final coda.

The first Russian air returns in measure 335 with a warmer tone in the oboe, with the other wind instruments joining later. All instruments finally come together once more in measure 343, leading up to the coda.

Wei-Hsien Lien gives a detailed structural analysis of the Caprice:

Subject	Measures	Tempo	Meter	Tonality
Introduction	1–38	Poco allegro =106	common time	B♭ major
Danish Air
Theme A	39–55	Andantino .=52	6/8	D minor
Variation I	55–70	Allegretto .=66	6/8	D minor
Variation II	70–86		6/8	D minor
Variation III	86–106		6/8	D major
Variation IV	107–122		6/8	D minor
Russian Airs
Theme B	122–154	Moderato ad libitum	3/4	F major
Theme C	155–181	Allegro vivace =132	2/4	F major
Theme B', Intro	181–202		2/4	F major
Theme C	202–215		2/4	C major
Theme C'	216–240		2/4	F major
Theme C''	240–270		2/4	F major
Theme C'''	270–279		2/4	F major
Theme B', Intro	280–296		2/4	D♭ major
Theme C	296–314		2/4	F major
Theme C'	315–334		2/4	F major
Themes B, C'', Intro	335–383		2/4	F major
Theme C	383–392		2/4	F major
Theme C''' (Coda)	393–420	Un peu moins vite	2/4	F major

== Reception ==
At the premiere, the Caprice "greatly pleased the court", and made Saint-Saëns, Taffanel, Gillet and Turban repeat their performance in London two months later.

A contemporary critic for the Neue Zeitschrift für Musik, who attended a chamber music festival in Bonn in 1905, where the work was performed by members of the Société des instruments à vent, was less impressed: "The performance of Gouvy's Octet and Saint-Saëns' Quartet (Caprice sur des Airs danois et russes) on the third day was perfectly beautiful; only the choice of Saint-Saëns' Quartet is to be regretted, since this piece may be very beautifully crafted, but musically it is insignificant and certainly does not belong to the best that Saint-Saëns created. Only the themes in it, which Saint-Saëns did not compose himself, are attractive; the rest may be of interest to the music theorist, but it makes little difference to the listener. The work was completely out of the scope of the program."

Sabina Teller Ratner comments that the Caprice "exploits the wonderful hues and nuances of the woodwind palette: both the expressive and the mournful are interspersed with sparkling passages for the piano."

Edward Blakeman writes of the piece:

The Caprice finds Saint-Saëns at his most relaxed and entertaining. The form is simple: an introduction followed by three sections of melody-plus-variations, the last a semi-fugue. The melodies (whether authentic folk tunes or not) are gently plaintive and also lend themselves to more vigorous treatment. The mood, texture, and choice of register are constantly changing as Saint-Saëns shifts the focus around the wind instruments and the piano. [...] This is salon music of the finest quality, with all the old Second Empire sparkle of the Piano Concerto No. 2, which Saint-Saëns also played on [the 1887] tour. It catches precisely the luxurious spirit of the Russian court that was so sympathetic to French culture – an "enchanted world" of "snow and gilt" so brilliantly evoked by Sacheverell Sitwell.
