= List of compositions by Francisco Tárrega =

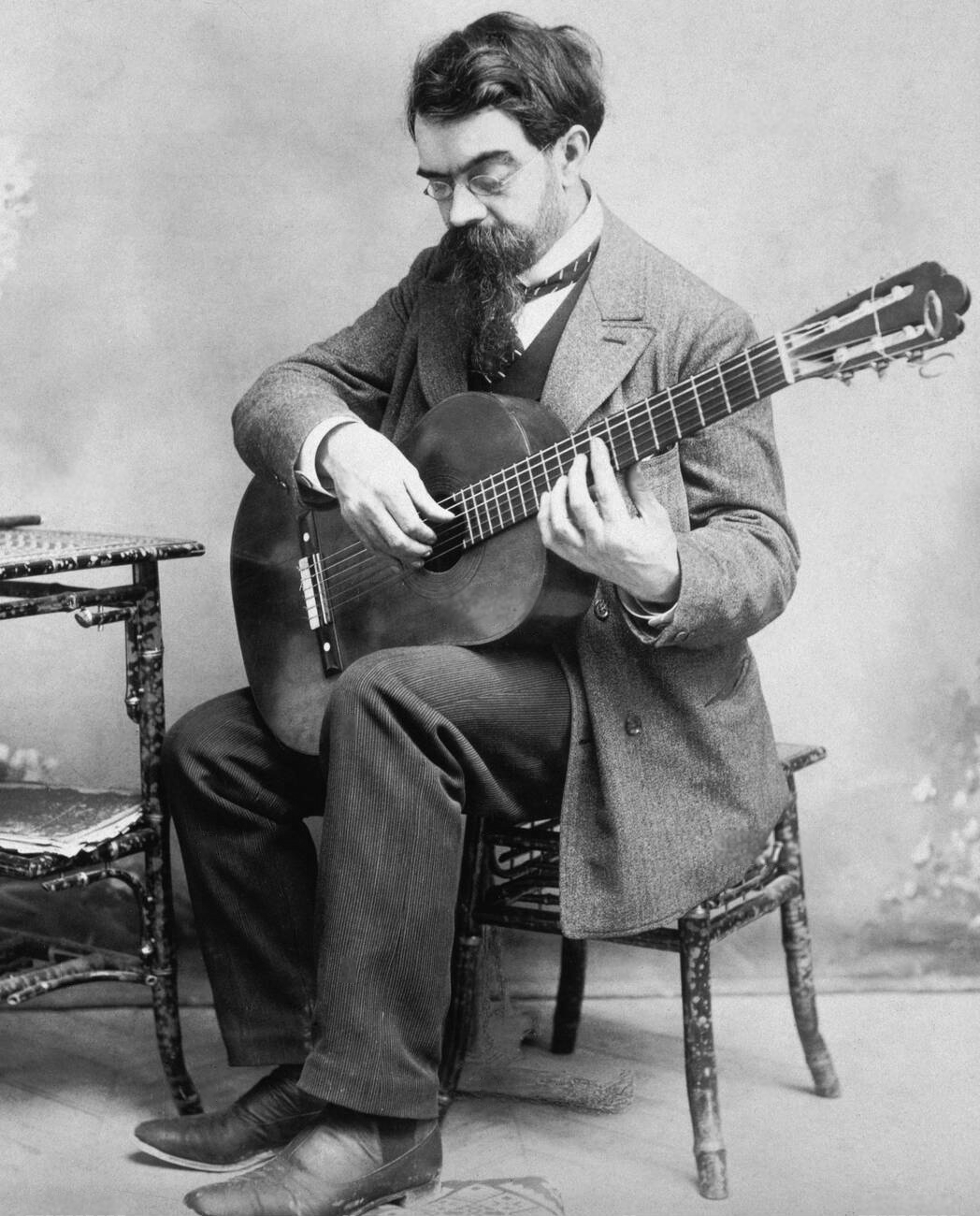

This is a list of compositions by Francisco Tárrega.

== Main works ==
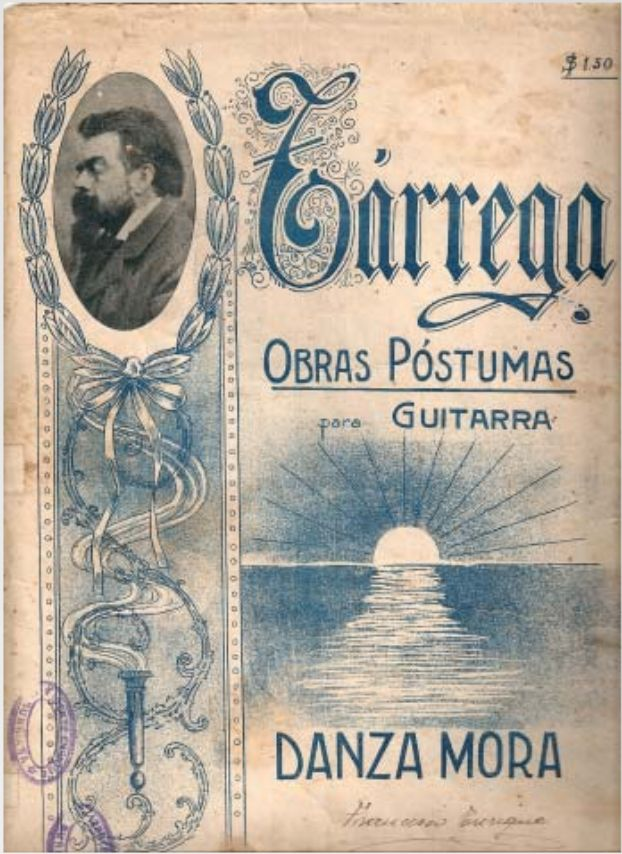
"Danza mora" sheet music compiled on Obras póstumas para guitarra (posthumous works for guitar)

Francisco Tárrega's Gran Vals

- Alborada (Note: The Little Music Box, also referred as "La cajita de música")
- ¡Adelita! (Mazurka)
- Capricho árabe (Arabian Caprice)
- Danza mora (Moorish Dance)
- Gran jota Aragonesa (Grand jota) (Note: Introduction composed by Julián Arcas the variations were improvised by Tarrega (per Emilio Pujol in Cereva 1972) and a few were written down.)
- El columpio (The Swing)
- María (Gavotte)
- ¡Marieta! (Mazurka)
- Rosita (Polka)
- Gran vals (Grand Waltz, used in the Nokia tune)
- Danza odalisca (Odalisque Dance)
- Pavana (Pavane)
- Paquito (Waltz)
- Pepita (Pepita)
- Vals en re (Waltz in D major)
- Recuerdos de la Alhambra (Memories of the Alhambra) (Note: Originally named "Improvisación ¡A Granada! Cantiga Árabe")
- Mazurka en sol (Mazurka in G)
- Sueño mazurka (Dream Mazurka, on a mazurka by Chopin)
- Minueto (Minuet)
- Isabel (Waltz on a theme by Johann Strauss II)
- La cartagenera (The Cartagena)
- Fantasía sobre motivos de "La Traviata" de Verdi (Fantasy on Motives of "La Traviata" by Verdi) (Note: Actually composed by Julián Arcas)
- Fantasía sobre motivos de "Marina" de Arrieta (Fantasy on Motives of "Marina" by Arrieta)
- Serenata española (Spanish Serenade) (Note: Unrealised)
- El ratón (The Mouse)
- Manchegas (Spanish Dance)
- ¡Maria! Tango (Maria! Tango, possibly not composed by Tárrega)
- La mariposa (The Butterfly)
- Malagueña fácil (Easy Malagueña)
- Estudio inspirado de Cramer (Study inspired by Cramer)
- Las dos hermanitas (The Two Little Sisters) (Note: Some editions include an introduction of the Grande Valse Brilliante Op. 34 No. 1 by Chopin))
- Variaciones sobre El Carnaval de Venecia de Paganini (Variations on Paganini's The Carnival of Venice)
- Lágrima (Teardrop)
- Endecha (Lament)
- Oremus (Let us Pray)

- Preludio en re (Prelude in D)
- Preludio en mi (Prelude in E)
- Preludio en la (Prelude in A)
- Preludio en sol (Prelude in G)
- Preludio en mi (Prelude in E)
- Preludio en re (Prelude in D)
- Preludio en sol (Prelude in G)
- Preludio en la (Prelude in A)
- Preludio en re (Prelude in D)
- Preludio en la (Prelude in A)
- Preludio en la (Prelude in A)
- Preludio en si (Prelude in B)
- Preludio en mi (Prelude in E)
- Preludio en fa sostenido (Prelude in F-sharp)
- Preludio en re (Prelude in D)
- Preludio en la (Prelude in A)
- Preludio en do (Prelude in C)
- Preludio en mi (Prelude in E)
- Preludio en la (Prelude in A)
- Preludio en la (Prelude in A)
- Preludio en la (Prelude in A)
- Preludio en la menor sobre un fragmento de Schumann (Prelude in A minor after a Fragment by Schumann)
- Preludio sobre un tema de Mendelssohn (Prelude on a Theme by Mendelsohn)
- Preludio pentatonica (Pentatonic Prelude)

- Estudio en forma de minueto (Study in the Form of a Minuet)
- Estudio sobre un tema de Damas (Study on a Theme by Damas)
- Estudio sobre un tema de Alard (Study on a Theme by Alard)
- Estudio sobre un fragmento de Beethoven (Study on a Fragment by Beethoven)
- Estudio sobre un fragmento de Mendelssohn (Study on a Fragment by Mendelssohn)
- Sueño trémolo (Dream (Tremolo))
- Estudio en sol (Study in G)
- Estudio en la (Study in A)
- Estudio en do (Study in C)
- Estudio en mi (Study in E)
- Estudio en la (Study in A)
- Estudio sobre un fuga de Bach (Study on a Fugue by Bach)
- Estudio sobre un tema de Verdi (Study over a Theme by Verdi)
- Estudio brillante de Alard (Brillant Study by Alard) (an arrangement of this song was the main theme of PBS/South Carolina Educational Television program NatureScene with naturalist Rudy Mancke)
- Estudio sobre un tema de Wagner (Study on a Theme by Wagner)
- Estudio de arpegios (Arreggio Study)
- Estudio sobre una sonatina de Prudend (Study on a Sonatina by Prudend)
- Estudio de velocidad (Velocity Study)

- Mazurka sobre un tema anónimo español para dos guitarras (Mazurka on an Anonymous Spanish Theme for Two Guitars)

== Other works ==
Tárrega made over 120 transcriptions, including arrangements of Spanish music for the guitar. Composers whose works he arranged include Chopin, Schumann, Schubert, Beethoven, Mozart, and Bach.
