= L'arte del violino =

- by Pietro Locatelli
- Year: 1733
- Period: Late Baroque
- Style: Italian
- Form: Violin concertos

L'arte del violino is a noteworthy and influential musical composition by Italian Baroque violinist and composer Pietro Locatelli. The twelve concerti were written for solo violin, strings, and basso continuo and were published in 1733 as the composer's third opus. The virtuosic style and artistry present in the work strongly influenced violin playing in the 18th century and cemented Locatelli's reputation as a pioneer of modern violin technique.

== Compositional History ==
L'arte del violino was first published by the publishing house of Roger-Le Cene in the city of Amsterdam, where Locatelli resided from the year 1729 until his death in 1764. It is dedicated to the Venetian patriarch Girolamo Michiel Lini, for whom he had performed while staying in Venice and of whose orchestra Locatelli remarked upon the skill and "unparalleled size."

== Structure ==
As opposed to his previous music, which models itself on the Roman style of baroque composition best exemplified by Arcangelo Corelli, the concerti of L'arte del violino were created in the newer Venetian style of Antonio Vivaldi. The music makes ample use of the violin's very high register, giving it a bel canto quality lacking in Locatelli's early work.

Each of the twelve concertos in L'arte del violino contained the traditional three movements, with the typical progression of two faster movements surrounding a slower, more contemplative middle movement. In each concerto, the two outer movements contain what is known as a capriccio. These capricci, often lasting several minutes, can be described as a kind of written-out violin cadenza played extemporaneously during which the soloist is given ample opportunity to display his or her skill with the instrument. The capricci intervals contradict the expected format of the solo concerto by occurring before the final ritornello of the tutti. It is these 24 extraordinary capricci intervals for which L'arte del violino attained its fame, for they are described as "the most difficult violin display passages of all Baroque literature."

The final concerto of the twelve, nicknamed the Labyrinth concerto by the composer, is notorious for its exceedingly difficult capricci. Locatelli wrote the following inscription beneath the first-movement capriccio: Laberinto armonico: ‘Facilis aditus; difficilis exitus.’ (Harmonic Labyrinth: Easy to enter; difficult to escape!)

In a letter dated April 11, 1741, Benjamin Tate, an English visitor, expressed his astonishment after listening to Locatelli play from the Labyrinth Concerto:

[He] has the most affected Look before he Begins to Play, that I ever saw in my Life. I have heard him Play that Concerto which is so prodigiously difficult. He told me himself that the Laberinth was quite easy in comparison of this Spavento; which he calls his 'Queüe de Vache'. There is a Caprice in it of seven Sides of very Large Paper wrote very close; there is not a Rest in the whole Caprice, where he could possibly Turn over a Leaf...I beg you'll let Fritz know, that Locatelli never sits by to Rest; but Plays for three Hours together, without being in the least fatigued. I never in my Life saw a Man Play with so much ease: He played that difficult Caprice as old Fritz accompanys his Son.

== Outline of concertos and movements ==
- Concerto No. 1 in D major, Op. 3/1
  1. Allegro
  2. Largo
  3. Allegro
- Concerto No. 2 in C minor, Op. 3/2
  1. Andante
  2. Largo
  3. Andante
- Concerto No. 3 in F major, Op. 3/3
  1. Andante
  2. Largo
  3. Vivace
- Concerto No. 4 in E major, Op. 3/4
  1. Largo – Andante
  2. Largo
  3. Andante
- Concerto No. 5 in C major, Op. 3/5
  1. Largo
  2. Adagio
  3. Allegro
- Concerto No. 6 in G minor, Op. 3/6
  1. Largo – Andante
  2. Adagio
  3. Vivace
- Concerto No. 7 in B flat major, Op. 3/7
  1. Andante
  2. Largo
  3. Allegro
- Concerto No. 8 in E minor, Op. 3/8
  1. Andante
  2. Largo
  3. Allegro
- Concerto No. 9 in G major, Op. 3/9
  1. Allegro
  2. Largo
  3. Allegro
- Concerto No. 10 in F major, Op. 3/10
  1. Allegro
  2. Largo – Andante
  3. Andante
- Concerto No. 11 in A major, Op. 3/11
  1. Allegro
  2. Largo
  3. Andante
- Concerto No. 12 in D major: Il Laberinto Armonico, facilus aditus, difficilis exitus, Op. 3/12
  1. Allegro
  2. Largo
  3. Allegro
