= Chris Freeman (Australian musician) =

Australian musician (c.1950–1992)

- Born: Christopher James Freeman c. 1950
- Died: 1992 (aged 41–42)
- Genres: Classical, flamenco
- Occupations: Musician, teacher
- Instruments: Guitar (six-string, 12-string, bass), organ, piano, synthesiser, Fairlight CMI
- Years active: 1974–1992
- Labels: T. S. F., Chris Freeman / EMI
- Formerly of: John Shaw

Christopher James Freeman (c. 1950 – 1992) was an Australian multi-instrumentalist and teacher who specialised in six-string and 12-string guitars for classical and flamenco music.

== Life and career ==
Freeman was taught the ukulele by his father when he was seven and learned the guitar at the age of eight. He began working on multi-tracking at the age of 16.

Freeman attended Geelong Grammar School in 1966, starting at Timbertop and was in C Unit. He formed the "Dementers," a three-member guitar vocal group with Dale Hollands and Jonathan Gibson. The trio sang occasionally in the Timbertop chapel. Prince Charles attended Timbertop this year and heard the trio. At his time, he owned a placid blue Fender electric guitar and displayed a solid rhythm in performing songs like the Trogg's hit "Wild Thing." He was a capable student, joining the higher math classes, and possessed a sharp (sometimes wicked) sense of humour. He was popular with fellow students and teachers. Despite his asthma, he was a determined cross-country runner who participated in the Marathon school run and compulsory long-distance weekend hiking events. In 1970, he attended Taylor's Coaching College in Melbourne, and during lunchtime, he and his friends would go to Allen's Music to play guitars and sing current Beatles songs. He liked John Lennon's songs, such as "Across the Universe." He was never shy when it came to performing music. He drove a white Volkswagen "V" dub, lived in Melbourne's eastern suburbs, and started performing at the Green Man coffee shop.

In 1967, when aged 17, Freeman's left-hand middle fingertip was severed in a car accident. He had it replaced with a silver one crafted in a playing position. Nicknamed "Silver Finger," he learned to work around the injury using his left hand "only to press down on the strings." At 21, he travelled to Spain and was taught by flamenco guitar virtuoso Manitas de Plata.

He released three solo albums, Thesilger (1976), Shifting Sands... Night & Day (1978) and Best of Chris Freeman (1991). He also issued four albums with keyboardist John Shaw, Chris Freeman and John Shaw (1981), Synthesized Orchestration (1983), Synthesized Orchestration Vol. 2 (1984) and The Best of Chris Freeman and John Shaw (1990).

In 1976, he self-financed his debut album, Thesilger (named after the replacement finger), on T. S. F. Records. Mike Daly of The Age felt Freeman "experimented with quaint effects involving digital harmoniser and distorted vocals – with mixed results." Two years later, Freeman followed with Shifting Sands... Night & Day. When performing solo, he used a backing tape with orchestral tracks previously recorded on a Fairlight CMI.

In May 1981, Freeman combined keyboardist and orchestral arranger John Shaw to issue an album, Chris Freeman and John Shaw, independently on Chris Freeman Records and distributed by EMI Records. Aside from his work, he also covered Gymnopedie by Satie and Recuerdos de la Alhambra by Tárrega. Daly described this album as "a very different proposition" compared to Freeman's debut: here, the "melodies are dominated by [his] lyrical adaptation of the rich flamenco style." The Sydney Morning Herald's Susan Molloy found it was "of precious quality and outstanding beauty," displaying a variety of styles "from classical to flamenco to rock and roll, from disco to calypso-reggae and soft country rock."

As well as recording and performing, Freeman taught flamenco and classical guitar techniques. In early 1982, he toured with the Peter Stuyvesant International Music Festival. He issued two further albums with Shaw, Synthesized Orchestration (1983) and Synthesized Orchestration Vol. 2 (1984). In 1990, Freeman and Shaw compiled their collaborations on CD, The Best of Chris Freeman and John Shaw. The following year, he released a solo compilation album, Best of Chris Freeman.

Freeman died in 1992, aged 41 or 42, after an asthma attack. Australian musicologist Ian McFarlane described him as a "[g]ifted multi-instrumentalist" who "garnered considerable praise for his work, but he never embraced the notion of mainstream acceptance".
