= Lágrima (Tárrega) =

Guitar composition by Francisco Tárrega

- by Francisco Tárrega
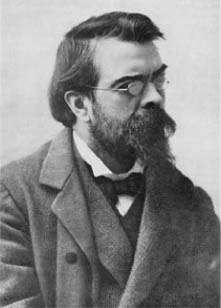
- Tárrega in c. 1890
- Key: E major
- Composed: 1891
- Scoring: Guitar

Lágrima (Teardrop) is a romantic prelude for solo guitar by Spanish guitarist Francisco Tárrega. It is one of the best-known original compositions by Tárrega. It has been published by Ildefonso Alier.

== Analysis ==
Lágrima is a very short miniature consisting of only 16 bars. It takes around 2 minutes to perform and its tempo marking is andante. It has an A-B-A structure, section A being in E major and B in E minor, and has been overwhelmingly highlighted by critics because of its simplicity and melancholic atmosphere. Each section has 8 bars. Section A consists of a very simple and predictable melody with quarter notes and dotted half notes, while the accompaniment has eighth notes. Section B turns a little bit less predictable but otherwise still very simple, with eighth notes on the main voice. At the end of section B, section A is repeated to close the work. As usual in Tárrega's composition, Lágrima bears some technical difficulties in spite of its simplicity.

Composed between late 1891 and early 1892, it is one of Tárrega's most performed pieces. Lágrima has not been included in a definitive catalogue of his works. It has been, however, included in other collections of pieces and has been numbered depending on the position in those collections or in recordings.

== Notable recordings ==
The following is a list of notable performances of this composition:

Guitarist	Record Company	Year of Recording	Format
Narciso Yepes	Deutsche Grammophon	1982	CD
David Russell	Opera tres	1991	CD
Norbert Kraft	Naxos Records	1994	CD
David Martínez	Naxos Records	2005	CD
Mats Bergström	Naxos Records	2009	CD
Pablo Garibay	Naxos Records	2011	CD

== See also ==
- List of compositions by Francisco Tárrega
