= Vicente Castell =

Spanish painter (1871–1934)

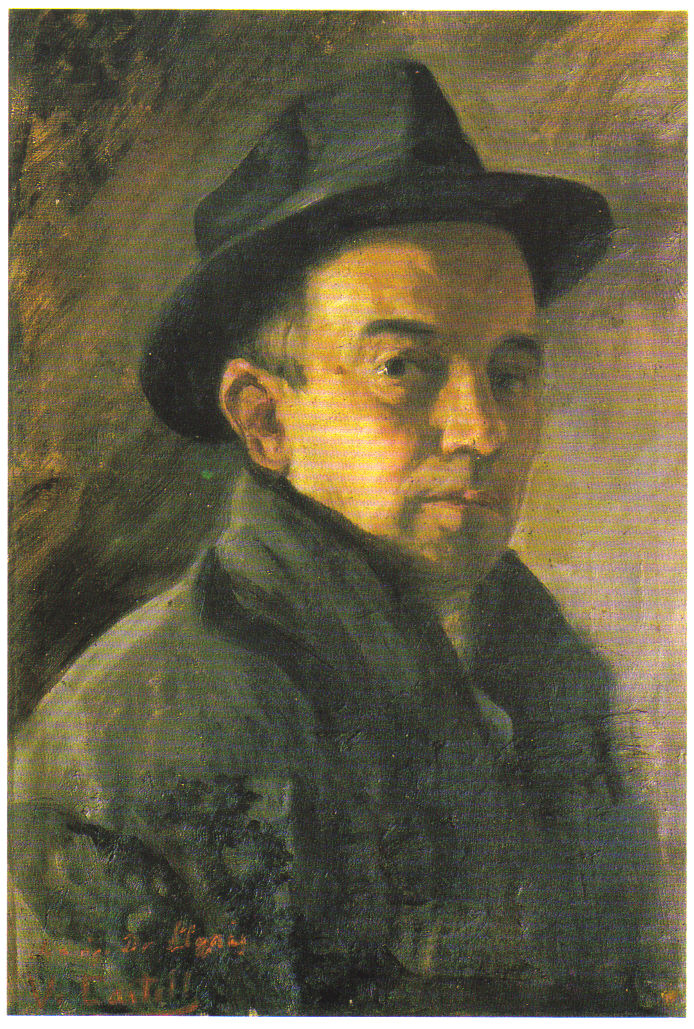
Self-portrait (1906)

Vicente Castell Doménech (5 May 1871 – 18 January 1934) was a Spanish painter in the costumbrista style.

== Biography ==
He was born in a lower-middle-class neighborhood in Castellón de la Plana where most of the residents, including his parents, engaged in handicrafts. He had a passion for drawing and, at the age of twelve, he was apprenticed at a local decorative painting workshop.

His talents eventually gained him entrance to classes being taught by the costumbrista painter and drawing professor, Eduardo Laforet, who had a home and workshop in Castellón where he served as a mentor to young artists.

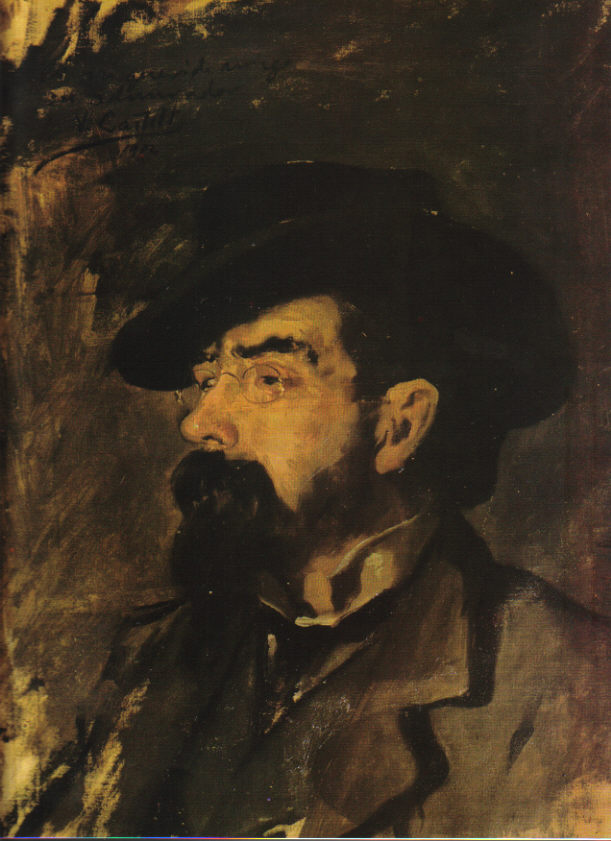
Portrait of the guitarist Francisco Tárrega (1904)

One of Laforet's associates helped Castell enroll at the Real Academia de Bellas Artes de San Carlos in Valencia, where he studied from 1891 to 1893, working at odd jobs and painting portraits to pay his way. While there, he came under the influence of Joaquín Sorolla and Ignacio Pinazo.

On the strength of his work, he received scholarships from the Diputación Provincial de Castellón. He also found a patron in Gaspar Cazador, proprietor of the Hotel España. These financial sources enabled him to study at the Real Academia de Bellas Artes de Sant Jordi in Barcelona from 1898 to 1899, followed by studies at the Real Academia de Bellas Artes de San Fernando in Madrid. There, he visited the Museo del Prado to acquaint himself with the Old Masters. He later visited Rome, where he became ill with yellow fever and nearly died. A friend intervened, however, and brought him back home, where he recovered and was able to attend the Exposition Universelle in Paris.

In 1901, he was awarded a bronze medal at the National Exhibition of Fine Arts. The following year, he married the niece of one of the painters he had been apprenticed to as a boy and opened an art academy. He would teach most of the best-known painters to emerge from Castellón, including Juan Bautista Porcar, Juan Adsuara Ramos and Matilde Segarra Gil.

During the war, with very little demand for art, he and a friend opened a small workshop where they made toys. After pricking the middle finger on his right hand with a large splinter, he developed an infection that required surgery and left that finger virtually paralyzed.

In 1923 the Mayor, Francisco Ruiz Cazador, appointed him a Municipal Councillor and he later became a Deputy Mayor. In 1928, he was one of the founders of the Escuela de Artes y Oficios and was chosen to be Director.

He suffered hearts attacks in 1932 and 1933, and died of a heart attack in 1934 in Castellón de la Plana. A street and a school in Castellón have been named after him.

== Selected paintings ==
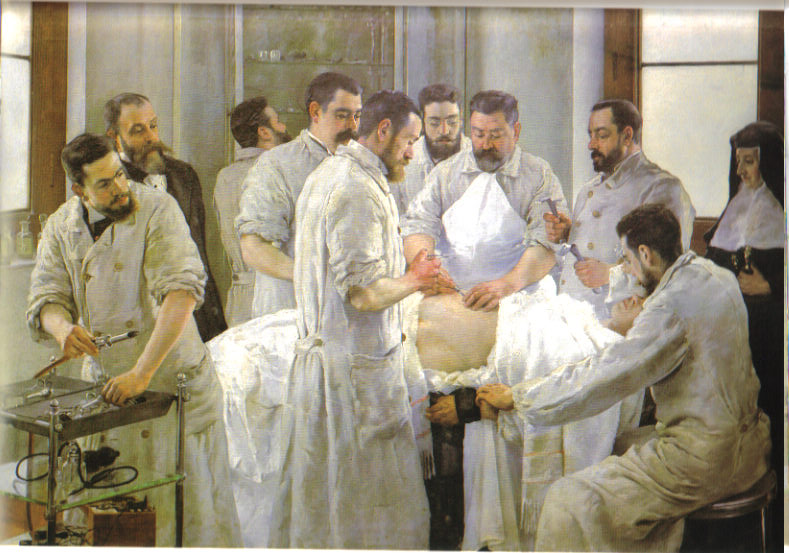
Laparotomy (1898)

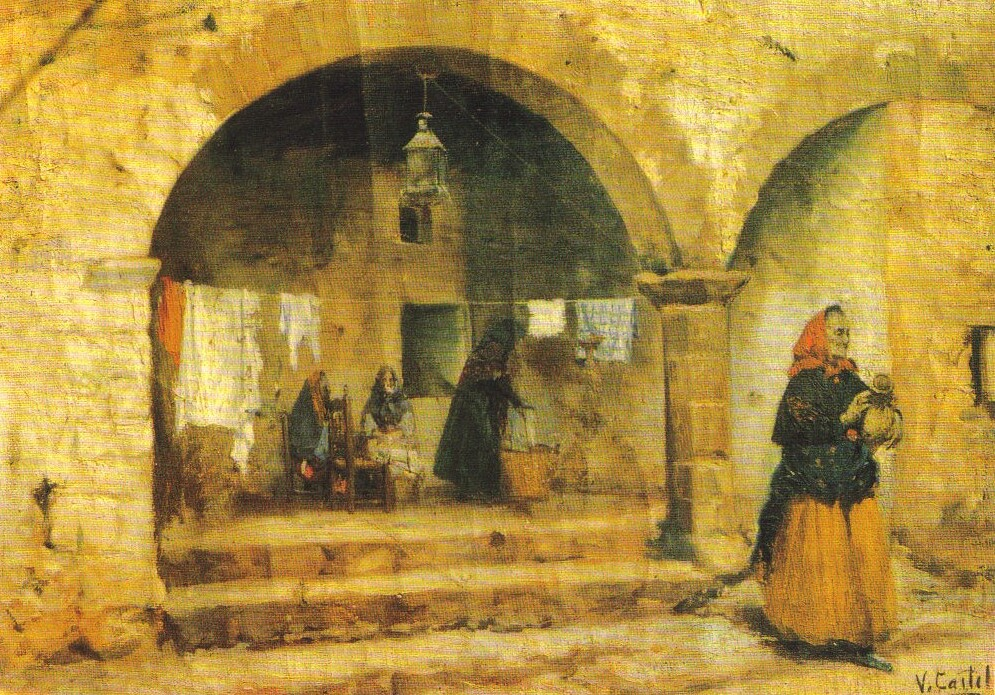
The Well at Benassal (1915)

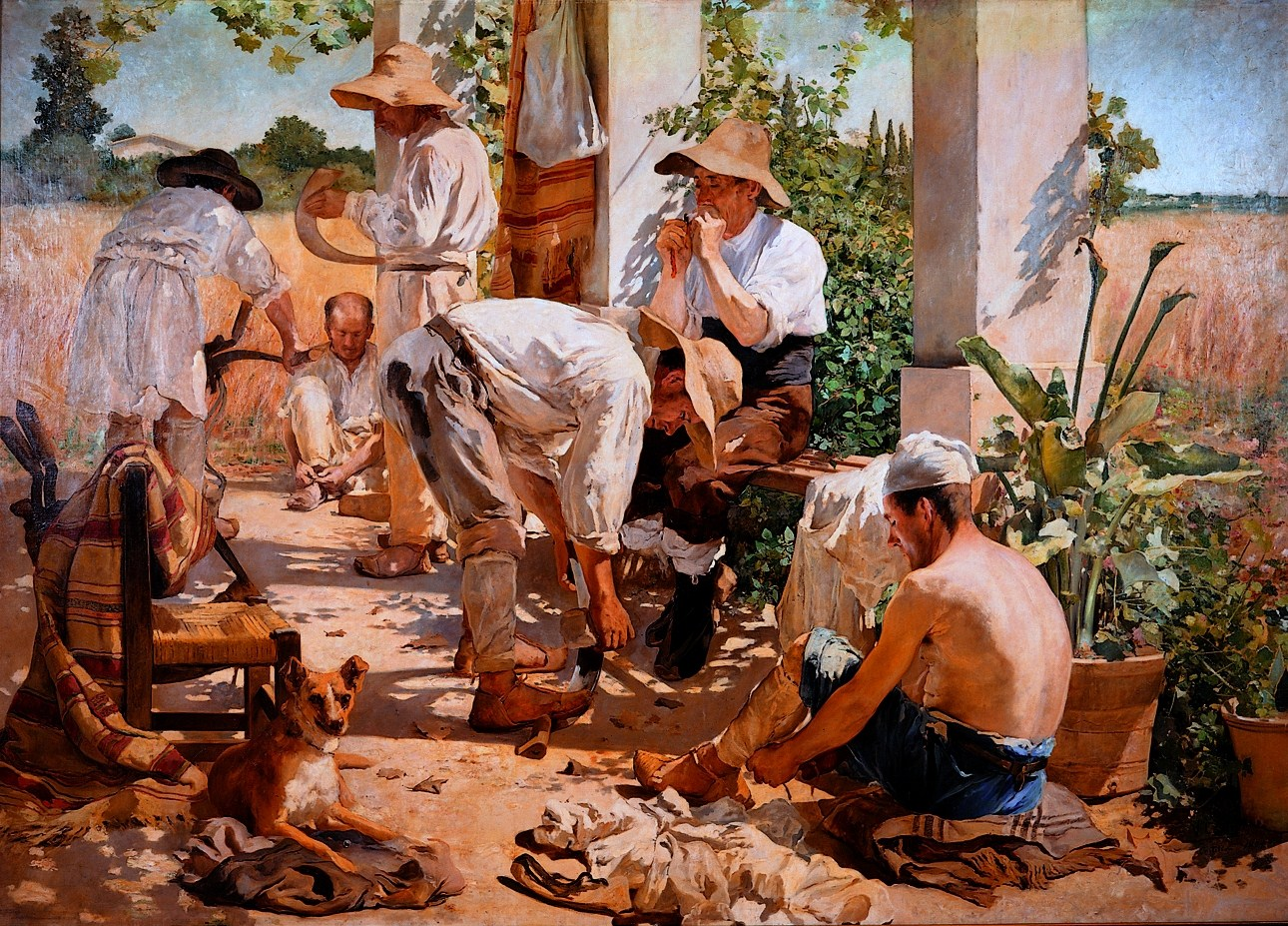
Reapers
