= Recuerdos de la Alhambra =

Classical guitar piece by Francisco Tárrega

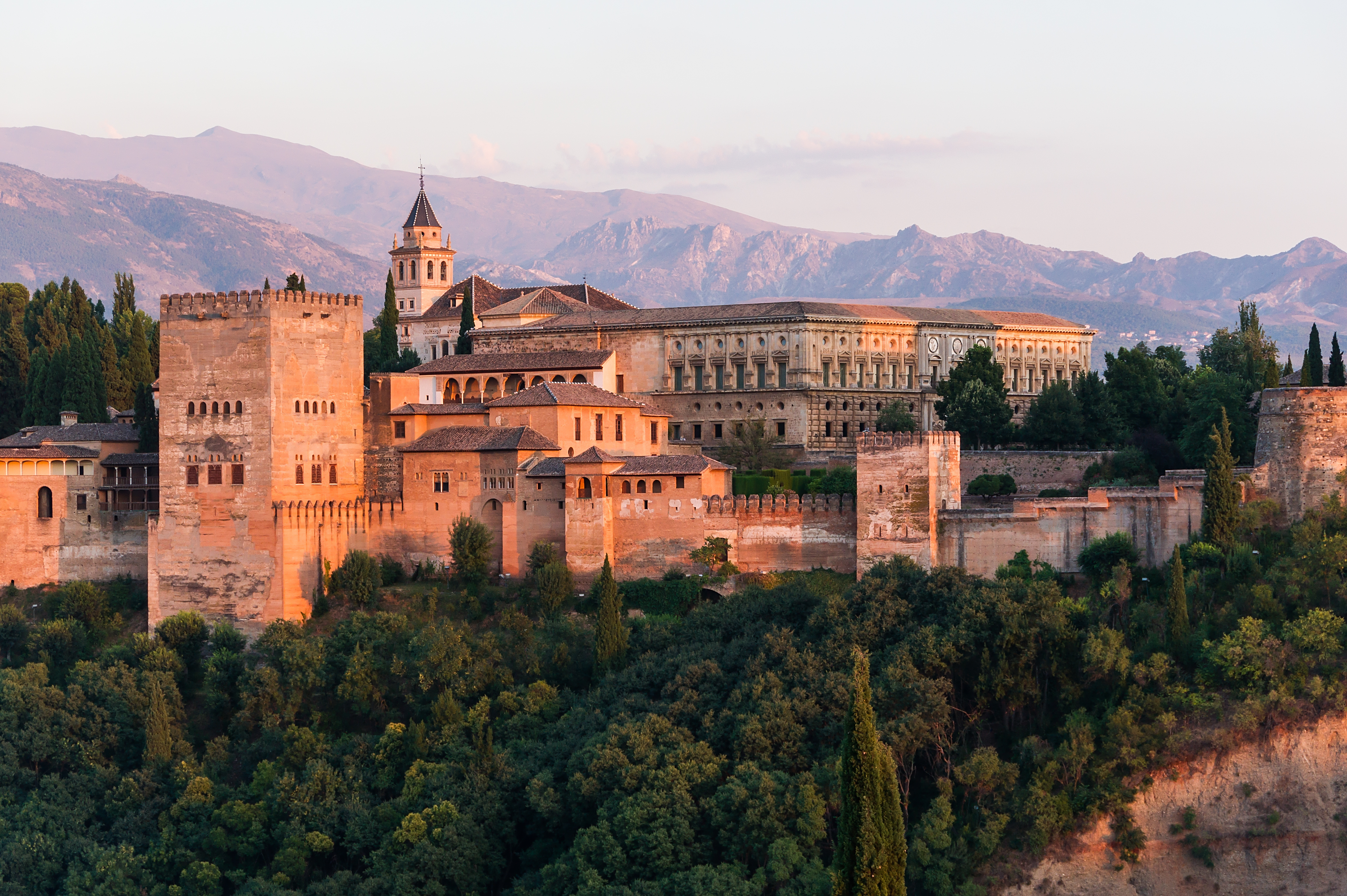
The Alhambra

"Recuerdos de la Alhambra"
Performed by Carlo Alberto Boni

Recuerdos de la Alhambra (Memories of the Alhambra) is a classical guitar piece composed in Málaga by Spanish composer and guitarist Francisco Tárrega. It requires the tremolo technique and is often performed by advanced players.

The piece was written for and dedicated to Tárrega's patron Concepción Gómez de Jacoby in 1899, commemorating their visit to the Alhambra palace and fortress complex in Granada, Spain. It was originally titled Improvisación ¡A Granada! Cantiga Árabe. It became known through an early 20th-century publication edited by Tárrega and dedicated as an homage to the French guitarist Alfred Cottin.

== Performance notes ==
The piece showcases a challenging guitar tremolo, wherein a single melody note is plucked consecutively by the ring, middle and index fingers in such rapid succession that the result is an illusion of one long sustained note. The thumb plays an arpeggio-pattern accompaniment simultaneously. Many who have heard the piece but not seen it performed mistake it for a duet.

The A-section of the piece is written in A-minor and the B-section is written in the parallel major (A-major).

== Arrangements ==
Ruggiero Ricci arranged this piece for solo violin and often performed it as an encore.

Chris Freeman and John Shaw recorded the song for their album Chris Freeman and John Shaw (May 1981, EMI Custom Records YPRX 1828, MAC 126).

Nana Mouskouri recorded a vocal version for her 1989 album Classical. Sarah Brightman recorded a re-adapted vocal version for her album Classics.

Alex Jacobowitz frequently performs a version of the song on his marimba and xylophone. He recorded it for several of his albums: Spanish Rosewood (1996), The Art of Xylos (2002), and Aria (2010).

Luiza Borac arranged this piece for solo piano on her 2014 CD "Chants Nostalgiques" (Avie AV-2316).

Xavi Ganjam made a special arrangement for sitar on his EP Soham (2019, Ganjam Records, Spain).

Italian violist Marco Misciagna published the arrangement of this piece for solo viola.

== Soundtrack use ==
Recuerdos de la Alhambra has been used as title or incidental music in many films, including the soundtrack for René Clément's Forbidden Games (as played by Narciso Yepes), for The Killing Fields (under the title Étude as performed by Mike Oldfield), and in the films Sideways and Margaret.

Performed and arranged by Jonathon Coudrille, it was used as the title music for the British television series Out of Town and a version performed by Pepe Romero was used as incidental music in The Sopranos episode "Luxury Lounge". Gideon Coe on BBC Radio 6Music uses this tune as a musical background at approximately the half-way point of his evening weekday show. A sung version appears in the Studio Ghibli film When Marnie Was There.

It is also the theme used for Philip II of Spain in the 4X strategy game Civilization VI, with the track progressing from a simple guitar arrangement to an entire orchestral performance as Spain advances through the ages.

The theme was part of the soundtrack and storyline for the eponymous 2018 Korean television series Memories of the Alhambra.

== Selected recordings ==
- Augustin Hadelich: Recuerdos - arranged for violin solo
