= Daniel Fortea =

Spanish guitarist and composer (1878 - 1953)

- Born: April 28, 1878; Benlloc, Spain
- Died: March 5, 1953 (aged 74) Castellón, Spain
- Genres: Classical music
- Instrument: Classical Guitar

Daniel Fortea i Guimerà (28 April 1878 in Benlloc, Spain – 5 March 1953 in Castellón de la Plana, Spain) was a Spanish guitarist, composer, and music educator.

== Biography ==
In his childhood, Fortea learned the clarinette, guitar and bandurria. From 1898 until 1909 he studied with Francisco Tárrega in Castellón de la Plana. His fellow students were, among others, Emilio Pujol and Miguel Llobet.

In 1909 Fortea founded in Madrid his own music school and began the Fortea Library, one of the most important collections of music for guitar. He also concertized and wrote works for guitar. One of his disciples was Paulino Bernabe Senior, who became a noted luthier.

== Works for guitar (incomplete listing) ==
- Alegrías sobre temas populares (1958)
- Allegro de concierto, Op.11
- Aquelarre, Op.32
- Balada, Op.47 (1947)
- Canción de Madre, Op.2 (1919)
- Capricho-Estudio, Op.13
- Cuentos infantiles, Op.12 (Canción de Cuna; Canción de Navidad; Marusiña)
- Danza de Gnomos, Op.23
- Danza de Muñecos de Carton, Op.31
- Elegía a Tárrega, Op.15
- En mi refugio, Op.42
- Estoy sólo!, Op.43
- Estudios poéticos, Op.25 (1929) (Dialogand; Serenata; Romance; Noche de Luna)
- Evacación, Op.16
- Hoja de violeta, Op.41, №1
- Homenaje a Sors, Op.46
- Impromptu, Op.17
- Improvisación (Gavota), Op.1 (1919)
- La Paxarina, Op.3
- Madrigal, Op.21
- Meditación, Op.24
- Murmullos, Op.27
- Nocturno, Op.33
- Pétalo de rosa, Op.41, №2
- Preludios, Op.37
- Remanso, Op.44
- Romanza, Op.7
- Sonatina, Op.20
- Suite espanola, Op.22 (Andaluza. Capricho; Solea; Granadina)
- Toledo, Op.14

== Bibliography ==
- Antonio Pérez Llopis, José Vicente Ripolles Daniel Fortea, la guitarra Castelló de la Plana: Diputació, 1989
- Daniel Fortea Méthode de guitare (Madrid: Biblioteca Fortea. Diverse editions)
