= Chris Freeman (scientist) =

British biochemist, Professor at Bangor University

Professor Chris Freeman is a British environmental scientist at the University of Wales, Bangor. Freeman is Professor of Aquatic Biogeochemistry in the College of Natural Sciences in Bangor. Freeman's research focuses on carbon cycling, with an emphasis on peatland carbon storage and dissolved organic carbon dynamics. His work is best known for its description of a mechanism known as the "peatland enzymic latch" and observation of a rising trend in aquatic dissolved organic carbon concentrations. His work has been recognised with awards from the American Society for Limnology and Oceanography and the Royal Society.

== Publications ==
- Freeman C, Ostle J, Kang H (2001). An enzymic latch on a global carbon store. Nature. 409, 149.
- Freeman C, C. D. Evans, D. T. Monteith, B. Reynolds and N. Fenner (2001) Export of organic carbon from peat soils. Nature 412, 785.
- Freeman C, Fenner N, Ostle NJ, Kang H, Dowrick DJ, Reynolds B, Lock MA, Sleep D, Hughes S and Hudson J. (2004) Dissolved organic carbon export from peatlands under elevated carbon dioxide levels Nature 430, 195 – 198.
- Bragazza L, Freeman C, T Jones, H Rydin, J Limpens, N Fenner, T Ellis, R Gerdola, M Hajek, T Hajek, P Iacumin, L Kutnark, T Tahvanainen, H Toberman. (2006) Atmospheric nitrogen deposition promotes carbon loss from peat bogs Proceedings of the National Academy of Sciences of the United States of America 103(51): 19386-19389
