= Pietro Locatelli =

Italian composer

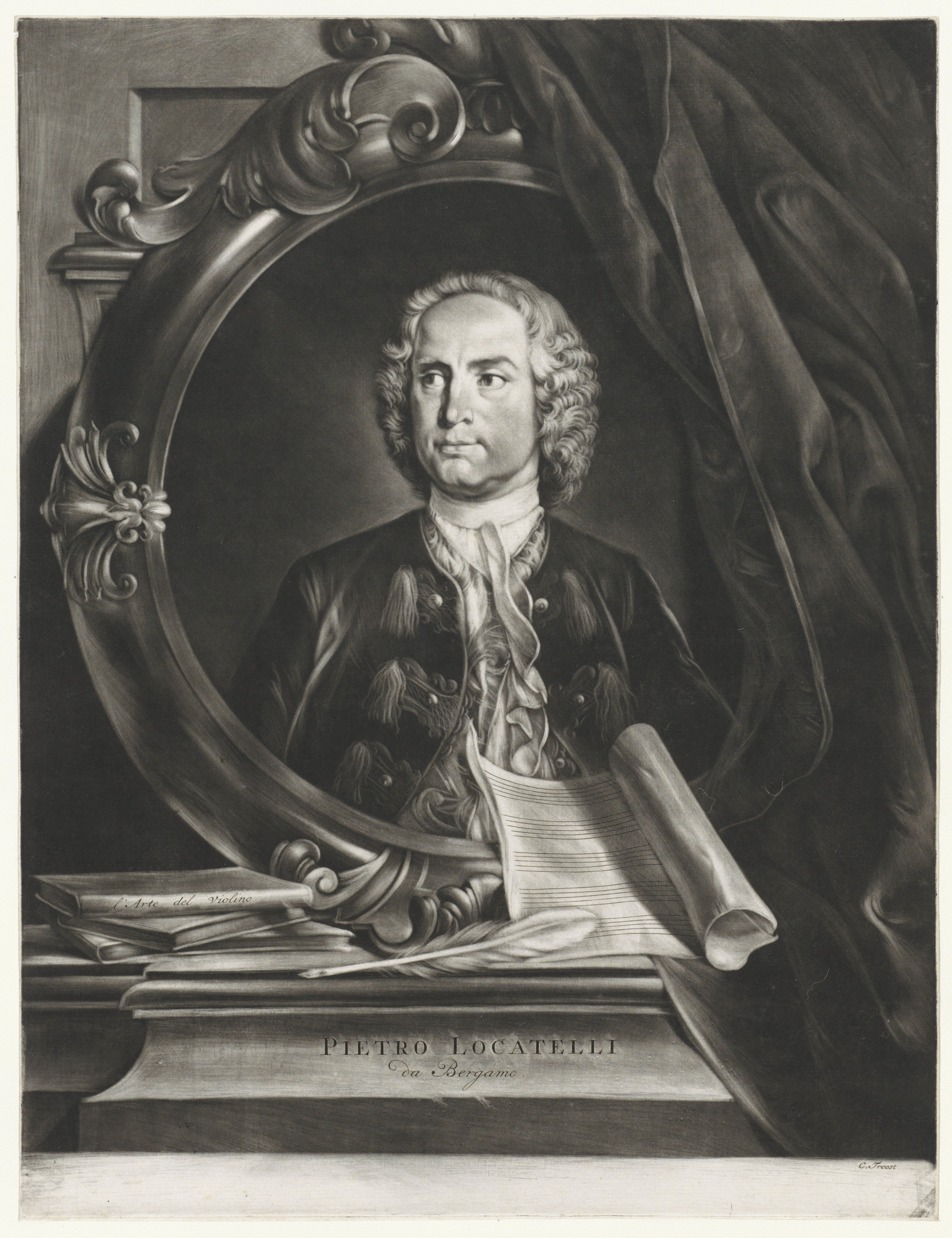
Pietro Locatelli c. 1733 Mezzotint by Cornelis Troost (1696–1750)

Pietro Antonio Locatelli (3 September 1695 in Bergamo – 30 March 1764 in Amsterdam) was an Italian Baroque composer and violinist.

== Biography ==
=== Bergamo ===
Little is known about Locatelli's childhood. In his early youth, he was the third violinist and held the title of virtuoso in the cappella musicale (musical establishment) of the church of Santa Maria Maggiore in Bergamo. His first violin teachers were probably Ludovico Ferronati and Carlo Antonio Marino, both of whom were members of the cappella. The maestro di cappella, Francesco Ballarotti, may have taught him composition. In autumn 1711, Locatelli went to Rome to seek greater recognition.

=== Rome ===
Locatelli began studying in Rome in autumn 1711, probably under Antonio Montanari or Giuseppe Valentini and perhaps for a short time under Arcangelo Corelli, who died in January 1713. In a letter of 17 March 1714, Locatelli wrote to his father in Bergamo that he was a confirmed member of the compita accademia di vari instrumenti, the household musicians of Prince Michelangelo I Caetani (1685–1759), where Valentini had worked as a violinist and composer since no later than 1710. Between 1716 and 1722, Locatelli was also a member of the congregazione generale dei musici di S. Cecilia, and thus under the protection of the noble prelate and future Cardinal Camillo Cybo. He also assisted other Roman noble houses, often including that of Cardinal Pietro Ottoboni in the church of San Lorenzo e San Damaso, probably until 7 February 1723. While in Rome, Locatelli debuted as a composer. In 1721, his XII Concerti grossi, Op. 1, dedicated to Camillo Cybo, was published in Amsterdam.

=== Travels through Italy and Germany ===
From 1723 to 1728, Locatelli travelled through Italy and Germany. Mantua, Venice, Munich, Dresden, Berlin, Frankfurt and Kassel are the only places he is known to have visited. Most of his concert compositions, including the violin concertos and the capricci, were probably written in this period. They were published later in Amsterdam. It is believed that his performances made him famous, but almost no source attests to his attaining high virtuosity.

Locatelli's activity at the court of the regent of Mantua, the landgrave Philipp von Hessen-Darmstadt, is attested by a 1725 document in which the landgrave refers to him as "our virtuoso". How often and in what capacity Locatelli performed at that court is not known. Also unknown is the time of his activity in Venice, although he certainly went there.

One notice describes Locatelli's visit to Munich. On 26 June 1727, the "foreign virtuoso Locatelli" was paid twelve double golden guilder by the elector's director of music.

Just one year later, in May 1728, Locatelli visited the Prussian court in Berlin. He moved from Dresden to Potsdam with Augustus II and the elector's escort of about 500 people, including Johann Georg Pisendel, Johann Joachim Quantz and Silvius Leopold Weiss. A notice about Locatelli's performance before Frederick William I anecdotally describes the musician's self-assurance and his vanity in wearing gorgeous, diamond-studded clothes. The Dutch musicologist Albert Dunning speculated that the aristocratic listeners may have preferred Johann Gottlieb Graun's violin playing to Locatelli's.

According to an entry in a rich autograph collector's records, Locatelli was living in Frankfurt on 20 October 1728. The entry includes a miniature version of the Andante from Sonata III, Op. 2, for piano.

Locatelli's last known stop was in Kassel, where he received the very high payment of 80 reichsthaler after his visit to Charles I, Landgrave of Hesse-Kassel, on 7 December 1728. The organist Jacob Wilhelm Lustig stated in 1728 that Locatelli had astonished his listeners with hugely difficult passages while scraping at his violin.

=== Amsterdam ===
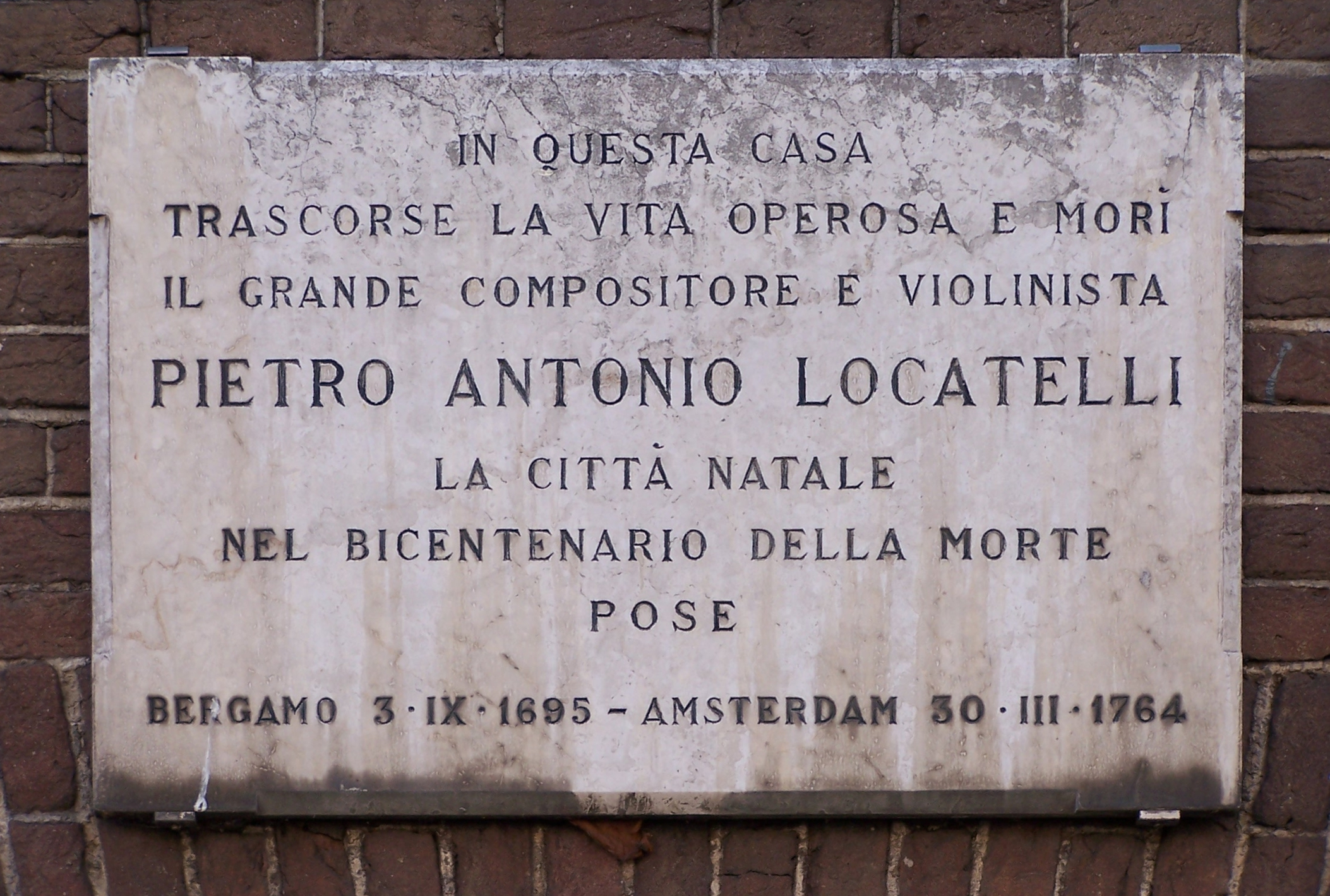
Plaque Prinsengracht 506, Amsterdam

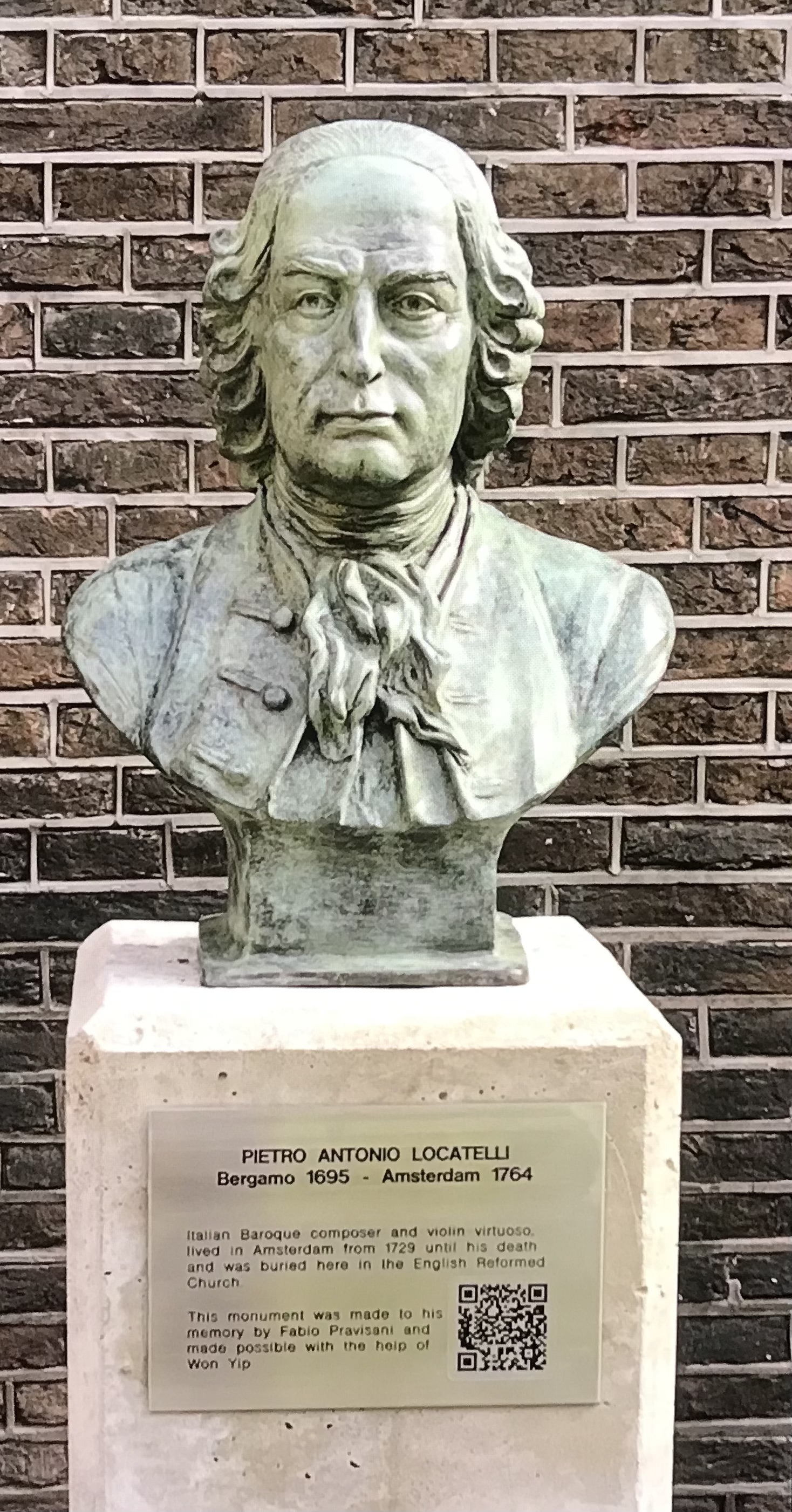
Monument of Locatelli at the Begijnhof

In 1729, Locatelli moved to Amsterdam, where he stayed until his death. He did not compose so much as previously, but gave violin lessons to amateurs and edited his opp. 1–9 and the works of other musicians, such as Giovanni Battista Martini's Op. 2. His sparsely documented public and semi-public performances were open only to music lovers, not to professional musicians. An Englishman who heard him in 1741 wrote "he is so afraid of People Learning from him, that He won't admit a Professed Musician into his Concert". Some rich music lovers, who would play as amateurs with Locatelli, helped him to become affluent. In aristocratic circles, he was a recognized, admired and supported virtuoso and composer. In 1741 he set up a business selling violin strings from his home. Including taxes he earned about 1500 guilders in 1742 alone, the highest income of any musician from Amsterdam. It is unknown why from 1744, when he released Op. 8, to 1762, when he released Op. 9, there were no reports of him from lexicographers, listeners or national and international music journalists.

Locatelli died on 30 March 1764 in his house on the Prinsengracht. He was buried in the English Reformed Church on the Begijnhof. In 2024 a small monument made by Fabio Pravisani was erected there in his honour.

=== Legacy ===
A library with over a thousand documents shows Locatelli's interest in literature and science. It includes ornithological, theological, church historical, political, geographical, art historical and mathematical works, and literature on music theory dating back to the 16th century. His nachlass includes all important writers from Dante on. Among the large quantity of printed and unbound sheet music, there are the collected works of Corelli. Also available are pictures by Dutch, Italian and French masters. All these things, as well as his instruments and much more, were auctioned in August 1765.

== Music ==
When Locatelli went to Amsterdam in 1729, he discovered the centre of European music publishing. He published his Opp. 2–6, 8 and 9 and a new edition of Op. 1 in Amsterdam, and Op. 7 in the neighbouring city of Leiden. He took great care to achieve flawless editions. Locatelli gave the well-arranged works to different publishers, and he edited and sold the less-arranged works.

Not only was Op. 1 composed in his early years, but also Op. 3 and parts of Op. 2 and 4 to 8. Locatelli obtained a privilege which protected Opp. 1–8 (which were also issued in Leiden, in Holland), from unauthorised reprints and prevented the import of reprints. In his application for the privilege, he referred to himself as an "Italian music master living in Amsterdam". As a consequence of the privilege, Locatelli had to give free copies to the Leiden University library; thus, the first prints have been preserved up to the present. An exception was Op. 9, which was published after the expiry of the legal protection.

Locatelli's works can be divided into three categories:

- works for his own performances as a virtuoso;
- representative works for larger ensembles;
- chamber music and small works arranged for small ensembles.

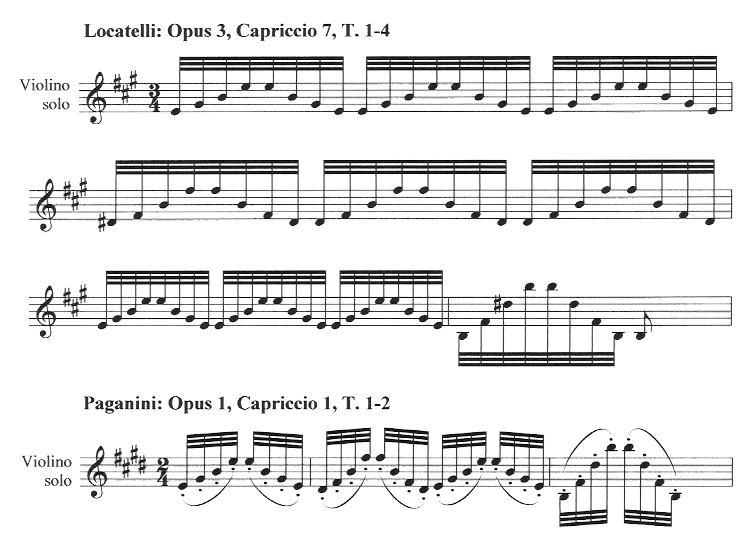
Comparison of Locatelli Op. 3, Capriccio 7 and Paganini Op. 1, Capriccio 1

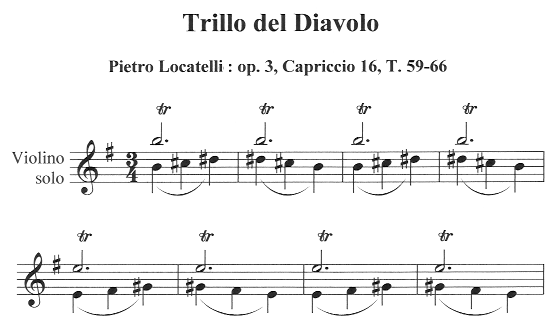
"Trillo del Diavolo" from Op. 3, Capriccio 16

Sonata in D, 1st movement

Examples of virtuoso works are the Violin Concertos Op. 3 with their associated Capricci, and the Violin Sonata Op. 6 with one Capriccio. Both works, and especially Op. 3, were standards for virtuosos and made him famous throughout Europe. The Capricci were important study and exercise pieces but were not intended for public performance. It was probably through French violin schools that musicians such as Niccolò Paganini discovered Locatelli's music. Paganini's Capriccio Op. 1, Nr. 1 is similar to Locatelli's Capriccio Nr. 7.

Locatelli's virtuosity is reflected in the Capricci through the use of high registers, double stopping, chords and arpeggios with wide fingering and overextension of the left hand, harmonics, trills in two-part passages (Trillo del Diavolo), double trills, varied bow types and variable bowings.

Locatelli's Concerti Op. 1, Op. 7 and those from Op. 4 are modelled on Corelli's Twelve concerti grossi, Op. 6. The Introduttioni teatrali Op. 4 follow the format of the Neapolitan opera sinfonia.

The Flute Sonatas, Op. 2, the Trio Sonatas, Op. 5, the Violin Sonatas and the Trio Sonatas, Op. 8 were popular in Amsterdam, favouring the city's overall galant image matched with contemporary popular music.

=== Works ===
- Op. 1 (1721) – XII Concerti grossi à Quattro e à Cinque, (12 four- and five-parts concerti grossi: in F, C minor, B flat, E minor, D, C minor, F, F minor, D, C, C minor, G minor)
- Op. 2 (1732) – XII Sonate à Flauto traversiere solo e Basso, (12 flute sonatas: in G, D, B flat, G, D, G minor, A, F, E, G, D, G)
- Op. 3 (1733) – L'Arte del Violino; XII Concerti Cioè, Violino solo, con XXIV Capricci ad libitum, (12 violin concertos with 24 Capriccios ad lib.: in D, C minor, F, E, C, G minor, B flat, E minor, G, F, A, D "Il laberinto armonico")
- Op. 4 (1735) – VI Introduttioni teatrali e VI Concerti, (6 theatrical Introductions: in D, F, B flat, G, D, C and 6 concerti grossi: in D, F, G, Eb, C minor, F)
- Op. 5 (1736) – VI Sonate à Trè, (6 trio sonatas: in G, E minor, E, C, D minor, G "Bizarria")
- Op. 6 (1737) – XII Sonate à Violino solo e Basso da Camera, (12 violin sonatas: in F minor, F, E, A, G minor, D, C minor, C, B minor, A minor, E flat, D minor)
- Op. 7 (1741) – VI Concerti à quattro, (6 four-part concerts: in D, B flat, G, F, G minor, E flat)
- Op. 8 (1744) – X Sonate, VI à Violino solo e Basso e IV à Trè, (6 violin sonatas: in F, D, G minor, C, G, E flat; and 4 trio sonatas: A, D, F minor, A)
- Op. 9 (1762) – VI Concerti a quattro (6 four-part concerts), Amsterdam 1762 (verschollen)
- Works without opus number:
  - Sonata in G minor, for violin and b.c.
  - Sinfonia [...] composta per l'esequie della sua Donna che si celebrarono in Roma F minor, for 2 violins, viola and b.c.
  - Concerto A major, for violin, 2 violins, viola and b.c.
  - Concerto E major, for violin, 2 violins, viola and b.c.
- Opera dubia (doubtful works): Violin concertos, symphonies, trio sonata, flute duets, one oboe sonata, one capriccio in E for violin.
- Numerous other works of different genres are lost.

== Sources ==
- John Hendrik Calmeyer: The Life, Times and Works of Pietro Antonio Locatelli, University of North Carolina, 1969
- (in Italian) Albert Dunning (publisher): Pietro Antonio Locatelli, Opera omnia, critical collected edition in 10 volumes, London/Mainz 1994, ISBN 978-0-946535-49-1
- (in Italian) Albert Dunning (publisher):Pietro Antonio Locatelli, Catalogo tematico, lettere, documenti & iconografia, Mainz 2001, ISBN 978-0-946535-40-8
- (in German) Albert Dunning: Pietro Antonio Locatelli. Der Virtuose und seine Welt. Buren 1981, ISBN 90-6027-380-X
- Arend Koole: "Pietro Antonio Locatelli", in: Musik in Geschichte und Gegenwart, 1st edition, vol. 8, Kassel et al., 1960, col. 1076
- (in Italian) Fulvia Morabito: "Pietro Antonio Locatelli", in Musik in Geschichte und Gegenwart, 2nd edition, vol. 11, Kassel et al. 2004, col. 357–362
