= Juliette Toutain =

French musician (1877–1948)

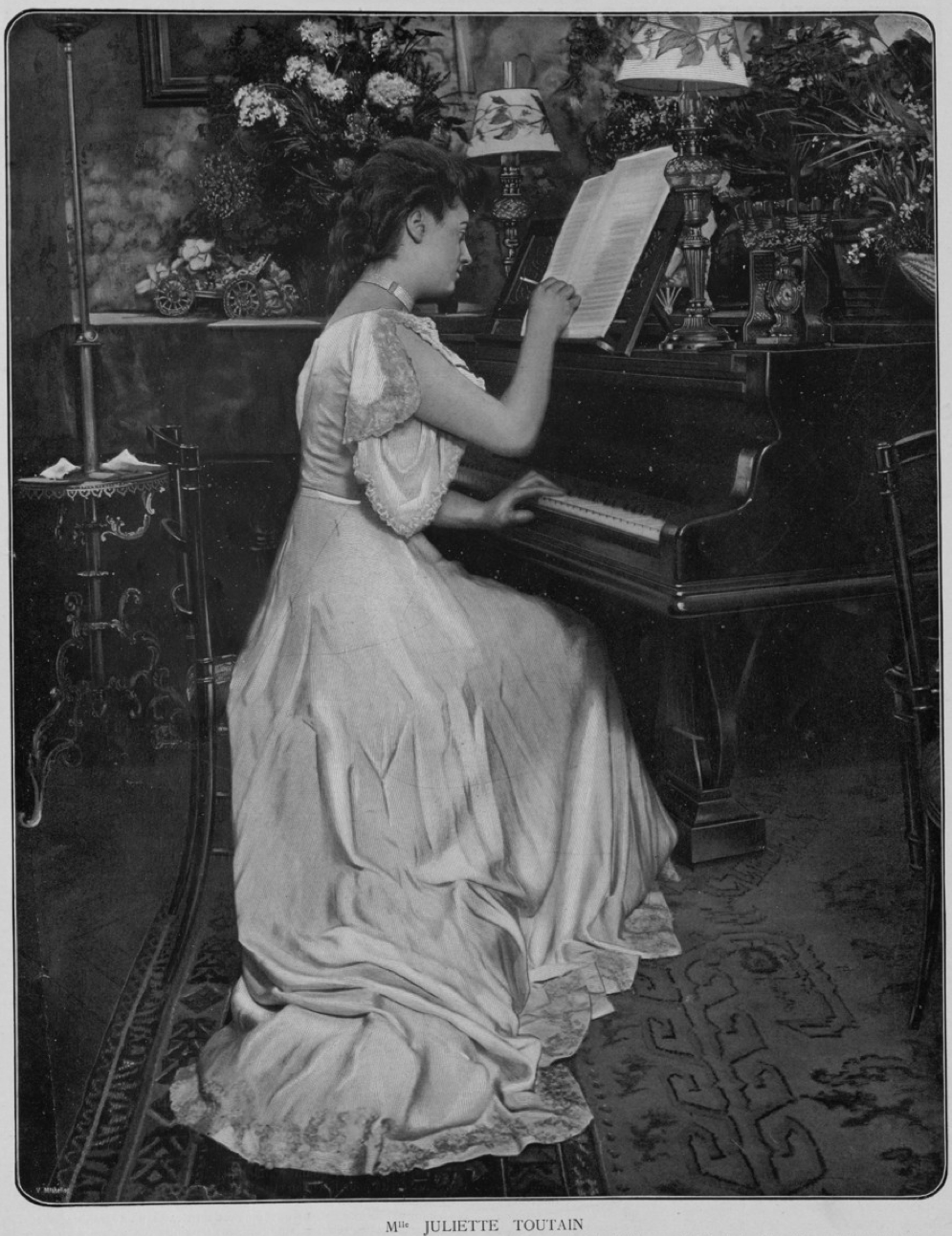
- Juliette Toutain, from a 1903 photograph
- Born: July 22, 1877; Trouville-sur-Mer
- Died: 1948 (aged 70–71)
- Other name: Juliette Toutain-Grün
- Occupations: Pianist, organist, composer
- Notable work: "Les Menottes" (1908)
- Spouse: Jules-Alexandre Grün

Marie Juliette Toutain (July 22, 1877 – 1948) was a French pianist, organist, and composer.

== Early life and education ==
Toutain was born in Trouville-sur-Mer in Normandy, the daughter of Jules Toutain and Théodorine Poret. Her father was a naval administrator; her mother was a piano builder who knew many musicians in Paris. Marie Juliette trained at the Conservatoire de Paris, where she studied composition with Gabriel Fauré and Auguste Chapuis, and was a prize-winning piano student of Raoul Pugno and Paul Vidal, and a top organ student of Alexandre Guilmant. She completed her studies at the Conservatoire in 1902. That year an American publication reported that "to a sufficient technic this young lady adds a charm and individuality of her own," adding that she was "the cause of a great deal of discussion at present. Although quite young, she has gained at the Conservatoire the first prizes for piano, organ, accompaniment, and harmony."

== Career ==
Despite her impressive training and international reputation, Toutain faced significant barriers on the basis of gender. Her family disapproved, and major competitions, such as the Prix de Rome, either did not accept women entrants, or made no practical arrangements for their attendance. Her efforts to participate, while unsuccessful, opened doors for other women's participation.

After her marriage in 1904, Toutain-Grün performed in concerts and wrote musical settings for poems by Albert Samain, Robert de la Villehervé, and Amédée-Louis Hettich to music, and wrote ten piano pieces called "Les Menottes" ("The Handcuffs", 1908). She composed a cantata on the beatification of Joan of Arc, which was performed at the dedication of a statue in Trouville in 1910.

Toutain was organist at the Notre-Dame-de-Bon-Secours church in Trouville. Louis Vierne's Suite Bourguignonne for piano (1899) was dedicated to her.

== Personal life ==
Toutain married artist Jules-Alexandre Grün in 1904. They had a son, Jean. Her husband died from Parkinson's disease in 1938, and she died in 1948.
