= Oremus (Tárrega) =

Guitar piece in D minor

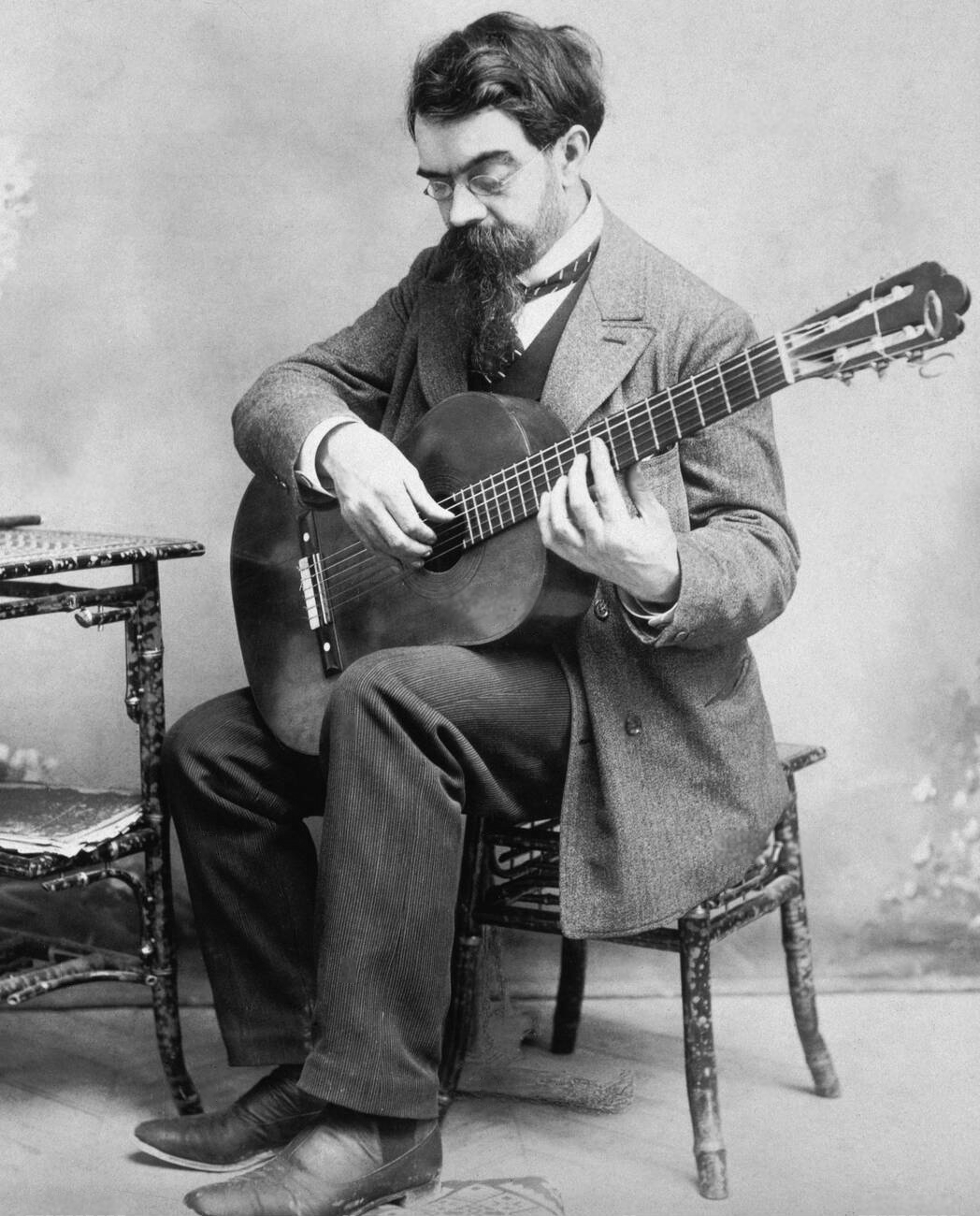
Francisco Tárrega pictured c. 1900

Oremus (Latin for "Let us pray") is a short guitar piece in D minor. Although it is usually presented as an original work by Spanish guitar composer Francisco Tárrega, it is actually a transcription of the second section of Robert Schumann's "Phantasietanz" from his Albumblätter (1853), Op. 124, no. 5.

It is often preceded by another piece by Tárrega, "Endecha" (Lament), and the two usually appear together as "Endecha – Oremus".

Due to limited scholarly analysis, information on the piece is widely considered to be scarce. Along with other well-known works, fidelity to the primary sources is rare, and has been apparently altered and edited by unnamed editors posthumously.

== Origin ==
"Oremus" is noted for being the last piece Tárrega wrote before his death in 1909 and was first published shortly afterwards in Madrid by Idelfonso Alier along with several other works from Tárrega's estate.

== Comparison to the original ==
Schumann's original piano work consists of two sections (A and B) which are both repeated giving it the form A–B–A–B while Tárrega's transcription only includes the B section. Since Tárrega was working on the piece shortly before he died, it is possible he intended to transcribe all of it but that assumption can not be confirmed.

The part Tárrega did transcribe shows several differences in the original, all fairly typical of what can be expected in a guitar transcription of a piano work.

The main difference between Schumann's piano work and Tárrega's transcription is tempo indication. Schumann gave the tempo as sehr schnell (very fast) while Tárrega's transcription was published with the tempo indication lento (very slow). This difference is reflected in the titles of the two versions of the composition. Without access to the original manuscript it is impossible to tell whether this re-interpretation was made by Tárrega or by the publisher.

== See also ==
- List of compositions by Francisco Tárrega
