= Capricho árabe =

1892 guitar piece by Francisco Tárrega

Capricho Árabe
- Composition by Francisco Tárrega
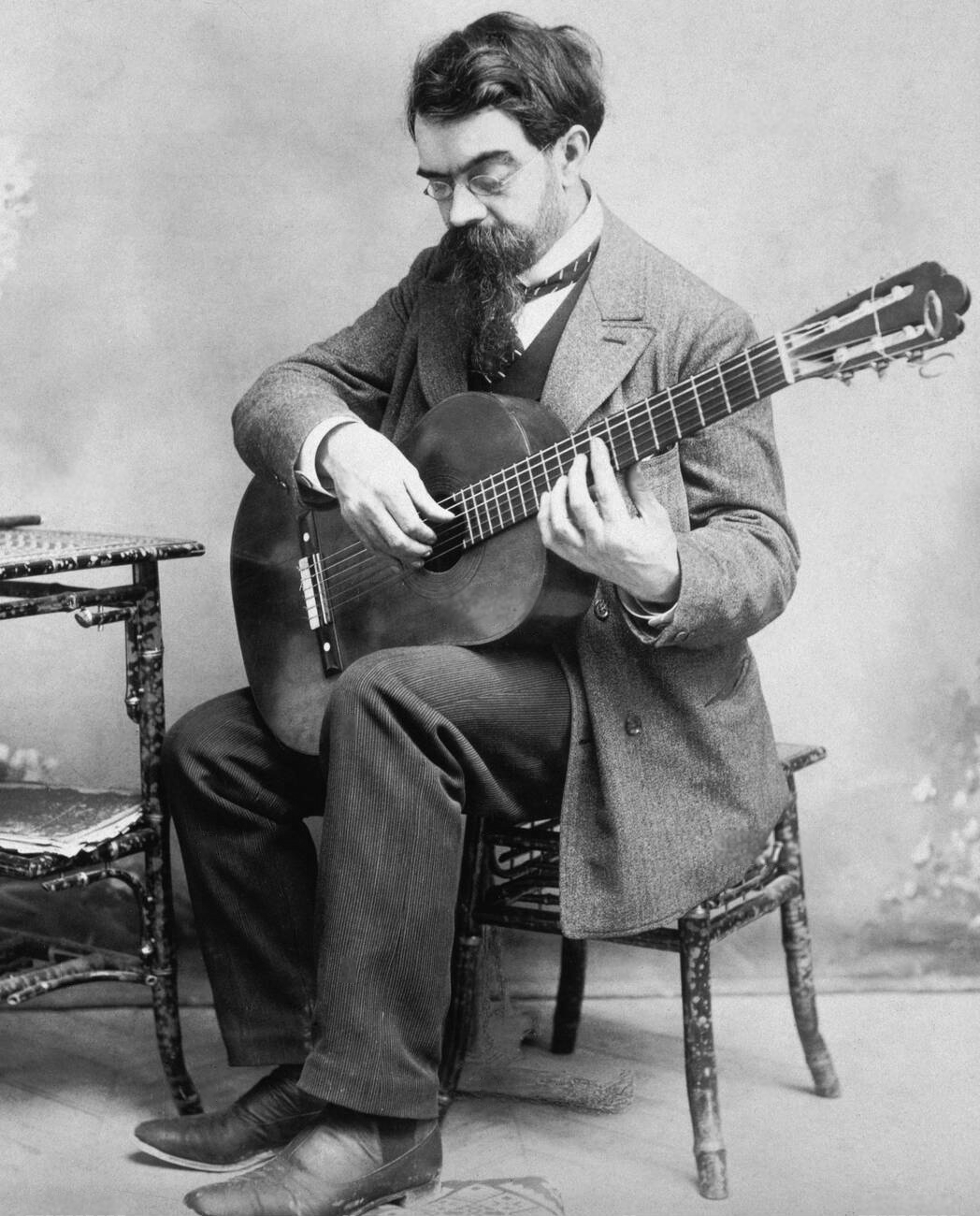
- Tárrega pictured c. 1900
- Key: D minor
- Year: 1892
- Genre: Romantic
- Form: AABA
- Dedication: Tomás Bretón
- Duration: Approx. 5 minutes

Capricho árabe (Arabic Caprice) is an 1892 composition by Spanish composer Francisco Tárrega. The piece was composed after a trip through Andalucia and North Africa, he dedicated it to his friend, conductor Tomás Bretón.

The piece is around 5 minutes long and is in AABA form with an introduction. The A sections are in D minor, while the B section modulates to the relative F major and then to D major, which is the parallel major of the home key. Performers must use drop D tuning to access the low tonic.

The A section melody begins with a sentence over a vamp between tonic and dominant chords:

A section, melody and bass line (D minor)

The B section begins with a transposed variation of the A theme but interpolates a new sequence played over a Circle of fifths progression:

B section, melody and bass line (F major)

Three bands surrounding Tárrega's coffin played the song during his funeral in his honour.

Capricho Árabe showcases Tárrega's unique style, which blends romanticism and Spanish musical traditions. It is also widely recognized for its beauty, and utilizes slur techniques like portamento on the classical guitar.

The piece was later used in the television series Miami Vice’s episode "Honor Among Thieves?".

== Arrangements ==
Capricho Árabe has been transcribed and arranged for various instruments beyond its original version for classical guitar. Italian violist Marco Misciagna created an arrangement for solo viola. Canadian guitarist Jamie Dupuis arranged and performed the piece on harp guitar. Several bass guitar arrangements have been made, including by Charles Berthoud.

== See also ==
- List of compositions by Francisco Tárrega
