= Francisco Tárrega =

Spanish composer and classical guitarist (1852–1909)

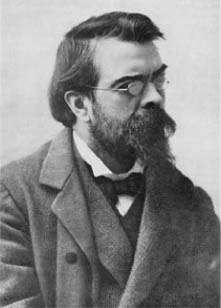
- Tárrega in c. 1890
- Born: Francisco de Asís Tárrega y Eixea; 21 November 1852; Villarreal, Spain
- Died: 15 December 1909 (aged 57); Barcelona, Spain
- Occupations: Composer; guitarist
- Years active: 1874–1909

Francisco de Asís Tárrega y Eixea (21 November 1852 – 15 December 1909) was a Spanish composer and classical guitarist of the late Romantic period. He is known for such pieces as Capricho Árabe, Recuerdos de la Alhambra and Gran Vals.

Widely celebrated as the "father of the modern classical guitar", Tarrega transformed the instrument from a minor parlor or accompaniment tool into a respected concert-stage solo instrument by moving the guitar away from informal salons and into serious public recital halls across Spain.

== Biography ==
Tárrega was born on 21 November 1852, in Villarreal, Province of Castellón, Spain. It is said that Francisco's father played flamenco and several other music styles on his guitar; when his father was away working as a watchman at the Convent of San Pascual, Francisco would take his father's guitar and attempt to make the beautiful sounds he had heard. Francisco's nickname as a child was "Quiquet".

As a child, he ran away from his nanny and fell into an irrigation channel and injured his eyes. Fearing that his son might lose his sight completely, his father moved the family to Castellón de la Plana to attend music classes because as a musician he would be able to earn a living, even if blind. Both his first music teachers, Eugeni Ruiz and Manuel González, were blind.

In 1862, concert guitarist Julián Arcas, on tour in Castellón, heard the young Tárrega play and advised Tárrega's father to allow Francisco to come to Barcelona to study with him. Tárrega's father agreed, but insisted that his son take piano lessons as well. The guitar was viewed as an instrument to accompany singers, while the piano was quite popular throughout Europe. However, Tárrega had to stop his lessons shortly after, when Arcas left for a concert tour abroad. Although Tárrega was only ten years old, he ran away and tried to start a musical career on his own by playing in coffee houses and restaurants in Barcelona. He was soon found and brought back to his father, who had to make great sacrifices to advance his son's musical education.

Three years later, in 1865, he ran away again, this time to Valencia where he joined a Romani family. His father looked for him and brought him back home once more, but he ran away a third time, again to Valencia. By his early teens, Tárrega was proficient on both the piano and the guitar. For a time, he played with other musicians at local engagements to earn money, but eventually he returned home to help his family.

Tárrega entered the Madrid Royal Conservatory in 1874, under the sponsorship of a wealthy merchant named Antonio Canesa. He had brought along with him a recently purchased guitar, made in Seville by Antonio de Torres. Its superior sonic qualities inspired him both in his playing and in his view of the instrument's compositional potential. At the conservatory, Tárrega studied composition under Emilio Arrieta who convinced him to focus on guitar and abandon the idea of a career with the piano.

By the end of the 1870s, Tárrega was teaching the guitar (Emilio Pujol, Miguel Llobet, and Daniel Fortea were pupils of his) and giving regular concerts. Tárrega received much acclaim for his playing and began traveling to other areas of Spain to perform. By this time he was composing his first works for guitar, which he played in addition to works of other composers.

During the winter of 1880, Tárrega replaced his friend Luis de Soria, in a concert in Novelda, Alicante. After the concert, an important man in town asked him to listen to his daughter, María José Rizo, who was learning to play guitar. Soon they were engaged.

In 1881, Tárrega played in the Opera Theatre in Lyon and then the Paris Odeon, in the bicentenary of the death of Pedro Calderón de la Barca. He also played in London, where he liked neither the language nor the weather. There is a story about his visit to England: after a concert, some people saw that the musician was in low spirits. "What is the matter, maestro?" they asked him. "Do you miss home? Your family, perhaps?" They advised him to capture that moment of sadness in his music. Thus he conceived the theme of one of his most memorable works, Lágrima (teardrop). After playing in London he returned to Novelda for his wedding. At Christmas 1882, Tárrega married María José Rizo.

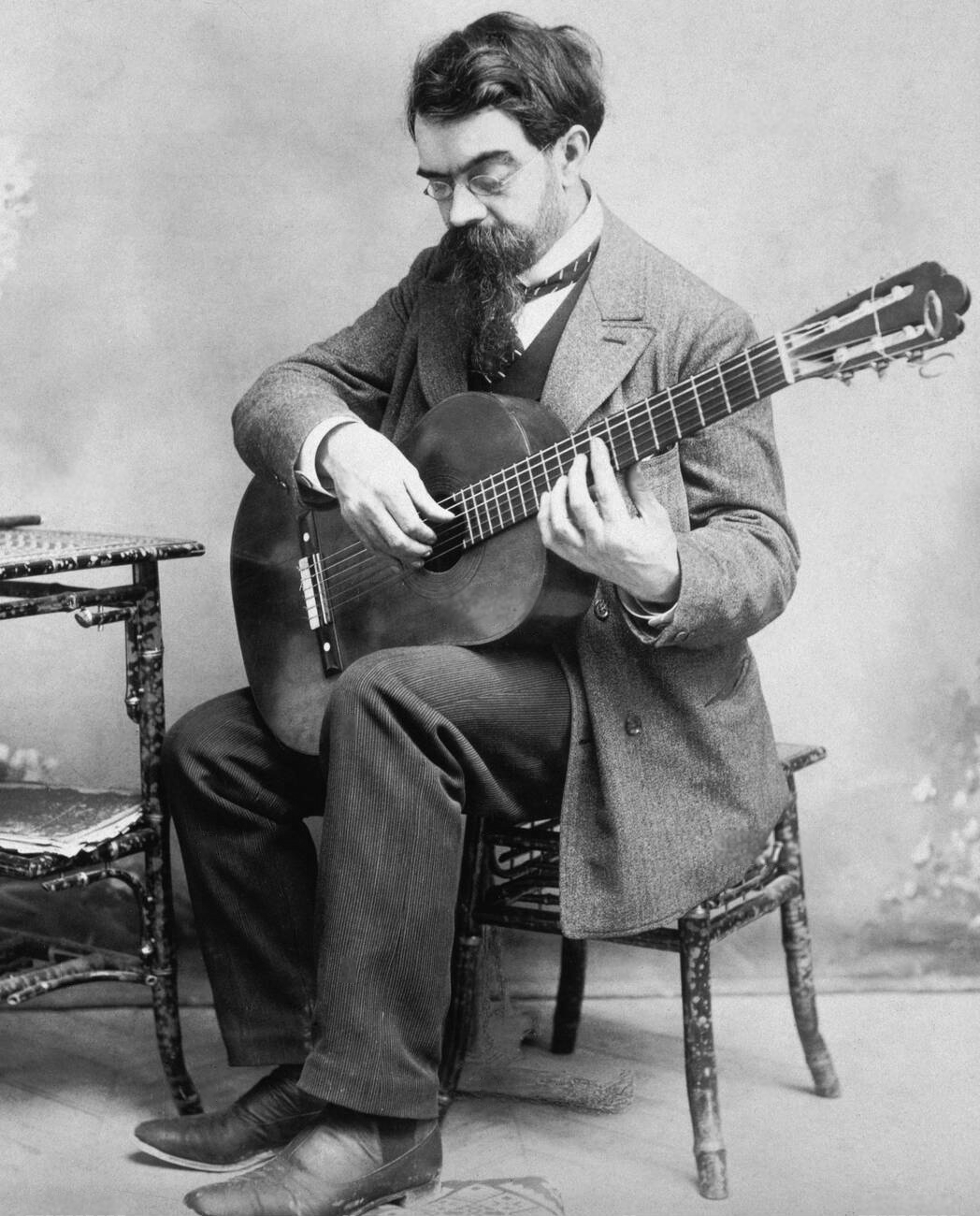
Tárrega pictured c. 1900

To enlarge his guitar repertory and to make use of his considerable knowledge of keyboard music, he soon began transcribing piano works of Beethoven, Chopin, Mendelssohn and others. Tárrega and his wife moved to Madrid, gaining their living by teaching privately and playing concerts, but after the death of an infant daughter during the winter, Maria Josefa de los Angeles Tárrega Rizo, they settled permanently in Barcelona in 1885. Among his friends in Barcelona were Isaac Albéniz, Enrique Granados, Joaquín Turina and Pau Casals.

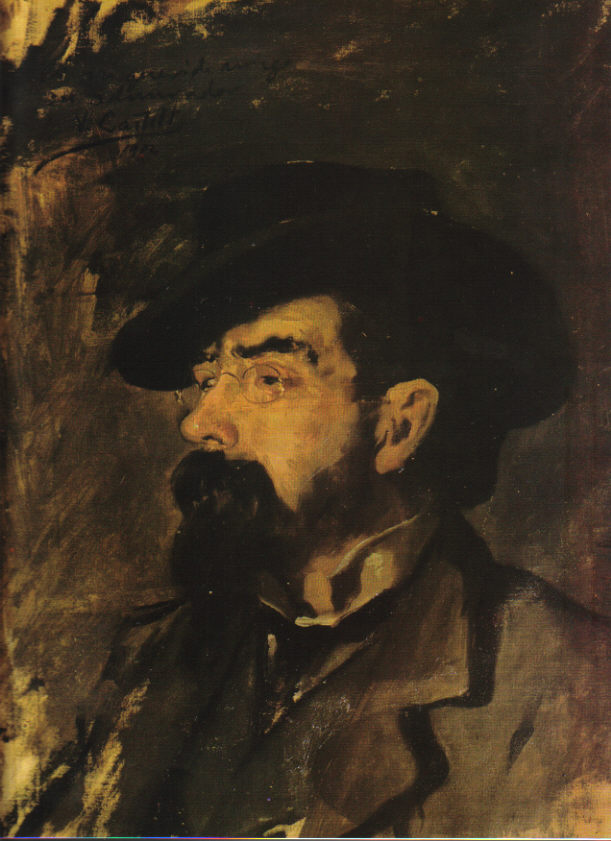
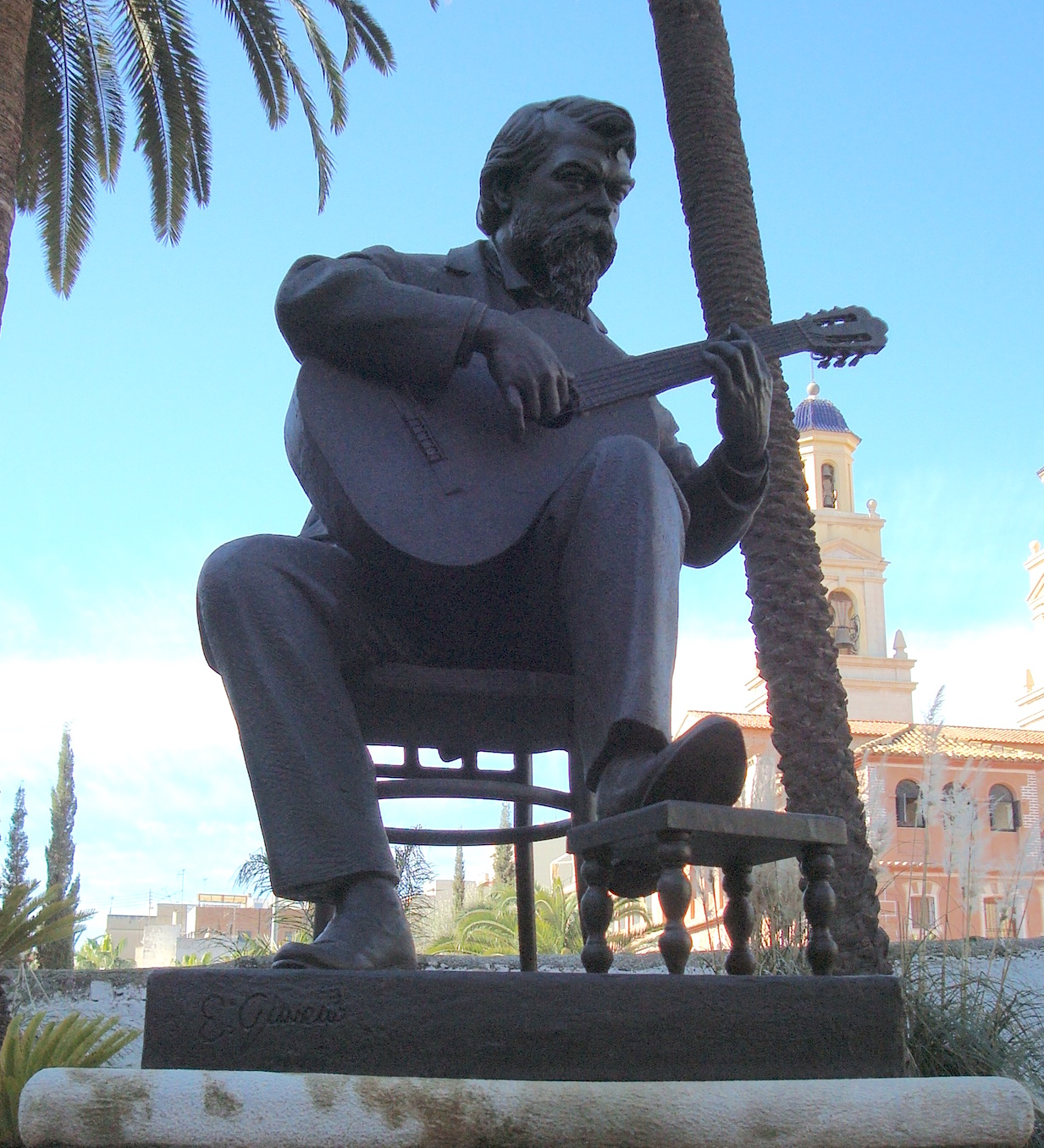
(Left): Portrait by Vicente Castell (1904); (right): Monument to Tarrega in Castellón, Spain

Francisco Tárrega and María José (María Josefa) Rizo had three more children: Paquito (Francisco), Maria Rosatia (María Rosalia) (best known as Marieta) and Concepción. On a concert tour in Valencia shortly afterward, Tárrega met the wealthy Concepción Gómez de Jacoby, who became a valuable patron to him. She allowed him and his family the use of part of her house outside Barcelona. Later she took him to Granada, which later inspired the guitarist to write Recuerdos de la Alhambra, which he first dedicated to Concepción in 1899 with the title "A Granada." He later dedicated a revised published version of this piece to Alfred Cottin, the French guitarist he had met in Paris while participating in a concert on a visit accompanied and almost certainly sponsored by Gómez de Jacoby.

From the later 1880s up to 1903, Tárrega continued composing and traveling, but limited his concerts to Spain. In 1900, Tárrega visited Algiers, where he was said to have heard a repetitive rhythm played on an Arabian drum and the following morning composed Danza Mora based on that rhythm. In about 1902, he cut his fingernails and created a sound that would become typical of those guitarists later associated with his school. The following year he went on tour to Italy, performing in Rome, Naples, and Milan.

In January 1906, he was afflicted with paralysis on his right side, and though he would eventually return to performing, he never completely recovered. He finished his last work, Oremus, on 2 December 1909. He died in Barcelona thirteen days later, on 15 December, at the age of 57.

== Musical style and influence ==
"Recuerdos de la Alhambra"
Performed by Carlo Alberto Boni

"Gran Vals"
Recreation by Joni Ikäläinen

Tárrega composed music in the Romantic style of 19th-century European masters. His conservatory training and familiarity with contemporary classical genres and techniques are apparent in his compositions and transcriptions; these are more sophisticated than those of Spanish guitarist-composers of the previous generation and his contemporaries, e.g., Magín Alegre, Tomás Damas, Julián Arcas, José Viñas, and José Ferrer.

A virtuoso on his instrument, he was known as the "Sarasate of the guitar," although Tárrega preferred small intimate performances over the concert stage.

Tárrega is considered to have laid the foundations for 20th-century classical guitar and for increasing interest in the guitar as a recital instrument. One of his late students, Josefina Robledo Gallego, promoted Tárrega's style on her concert tours to South America and is credited with "becoming the main disseminator of the Tàrrega school in Brazil."

The Francisco Tárrega International Guitar Competition has been held annually since 1967 in Benicàssim, Spain, which aims to promote his works and support emerging guitar talent.

== Compositions ==
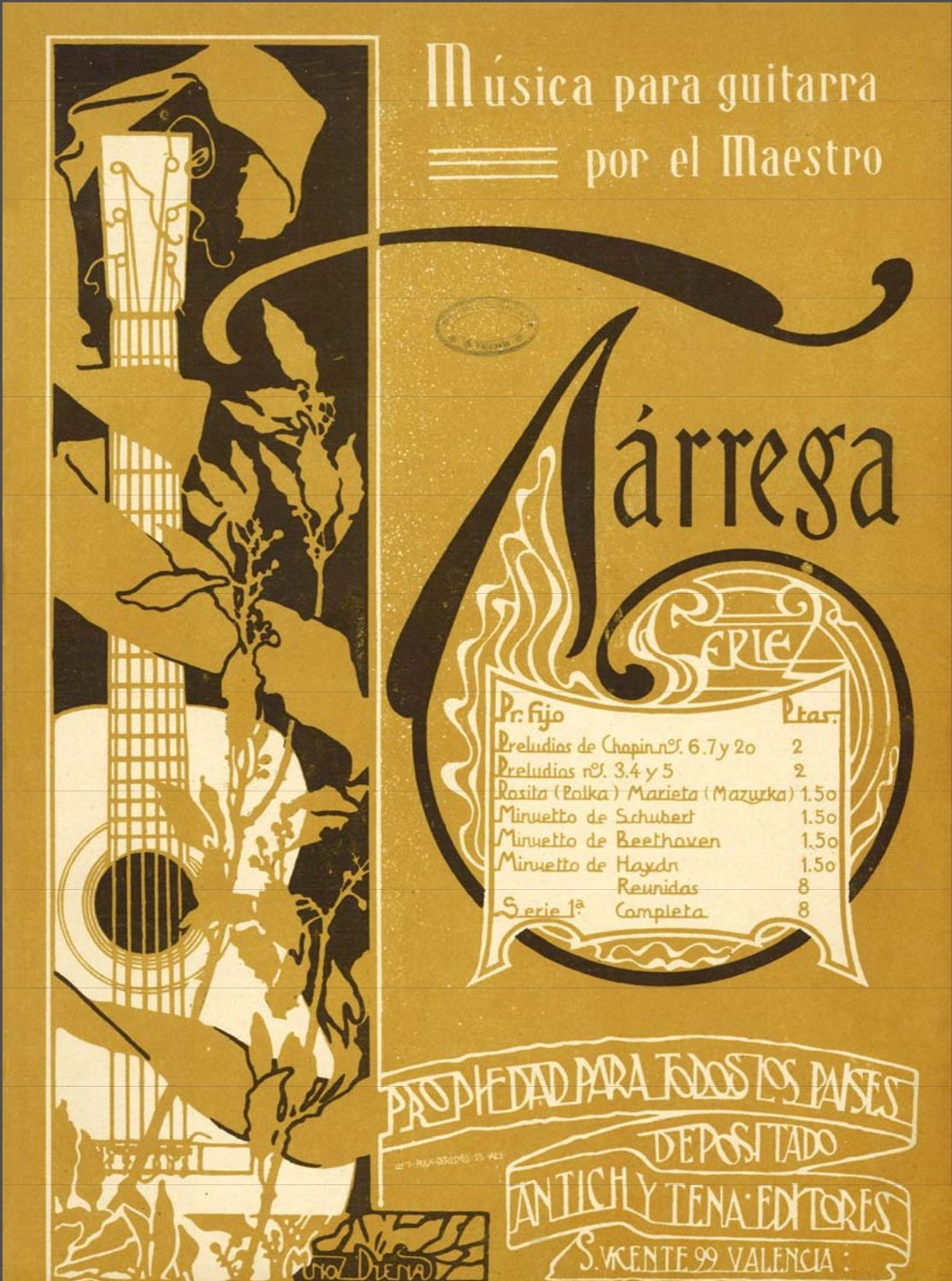
Sheet music of Tárrega compositions

Although only 19 original compositions were published in his lifetime, Francisco Tárrega composed approximately 80 original pieces and 120 transcriptions – mostly for his own use and that of his students. Most of his later published works were edited by others, and often altered. His favored genres were character pieces (several with Spanish, Moorish and Arabic allusions) including preludes, etudes, caprices, serenades, and dances.

He transcribed many works from the piano (he was a capable keyboard player), violin and the operatic repertory. As with several of his Spanish contemporaries, such as his friend Isaac Albéniz, he had an interest in combining the prevailing Romantic style in classical music with Spanish folk elements, and transcribed several of Albéniz's piano pieces.

He is also the composer of Gran Vals, an excerpt of which was used in the Nokia tune, the default ringtone of Nokia phones. It appears on these phones in a variety of different styles and instrumentations; for example, phones from 2002 to 2007 include piano-based renditions, while phones released during 2008 to 2010 feature a folk-inspired guitar rendition.

Violinist Ruggiero Ricci arranged Tárrega's Recuerdos de la Alhambra for solo violin and often performed it as an encore.

In 2015, the Italian violist Marco Misciagna published his arrangements for solo viola of the Tango, Capricho árabe and Recuerdos de la Alhambra.

== Guitars ==
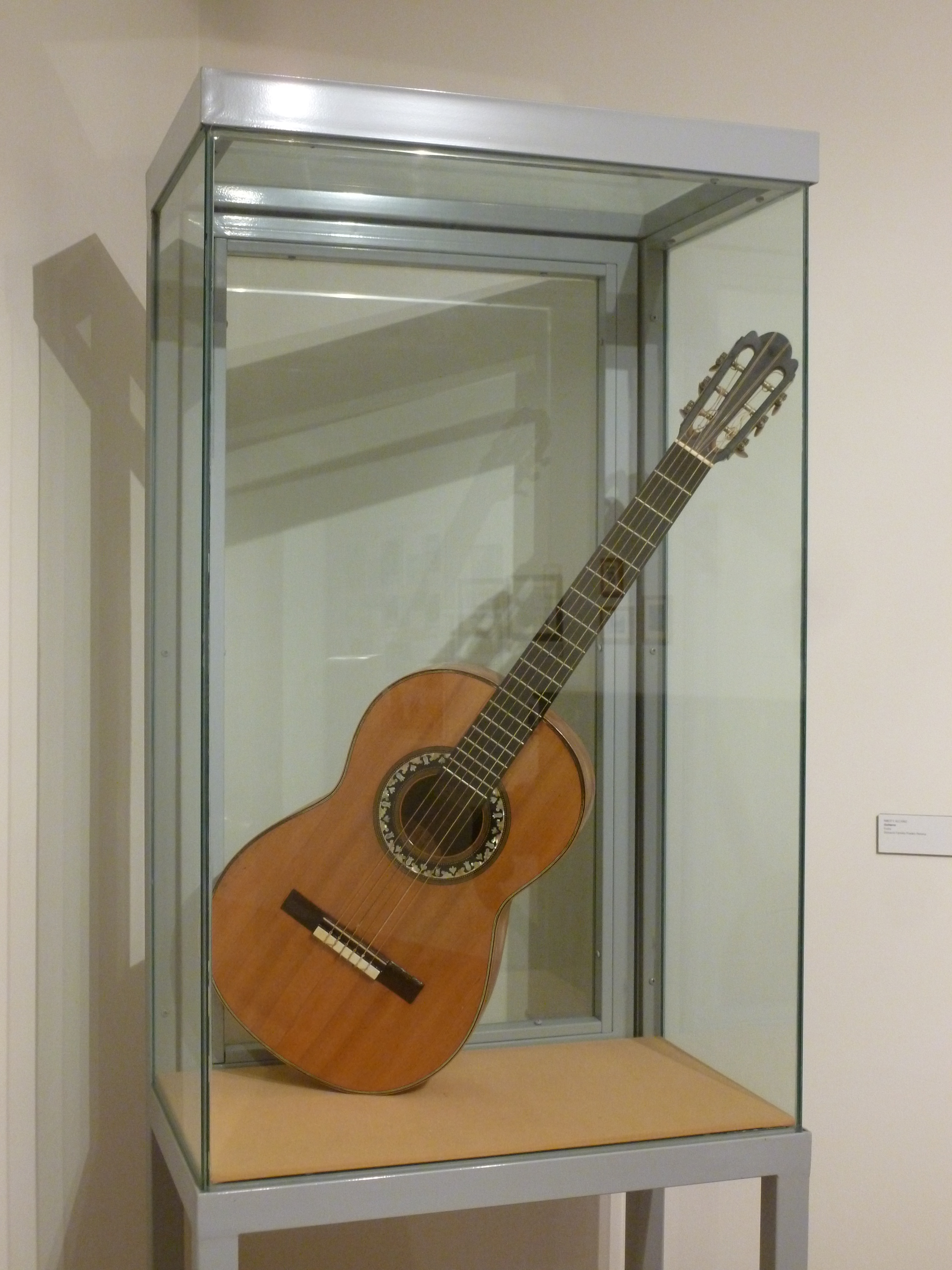
Tárrega's guitar, made by "Ribot y Alcañiz"

The guitars used by Tárrega include:

- Enrique Garcia, n°74 (1906) - This instrument was gifted by Tárrega to his friend Alfred Cottin, to whom he dedicated the composition Recuerdos de la Alhambra. It then became the official guitar of 'Les Amis de la Guitare', a circle of Parisian guitarists, where it was played by Django Reinhardt, among others. In 2019 Kyuhee Park recorded a video of Recuerdos de la Alhambra on this guitar. (See External Link)
- Torres, FE 17 (1869) – This is the guitar that was given to 17 year old Francisco Tárrega by Torres personally after hearing him play.
- Torres, SE 49 (1883)
- Torres, SE 114 (1888); in the collection of Sheldon Urlik
