= History of the mandolin =

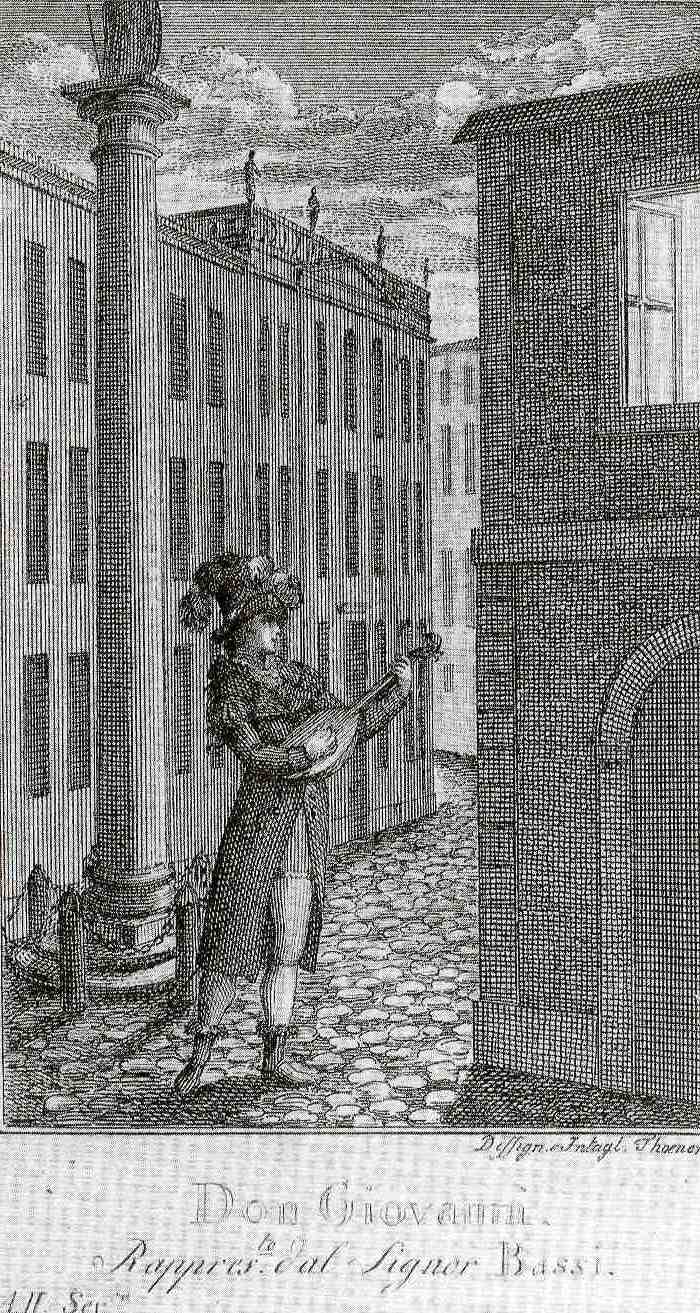
In 1787 Luigi Bassi played the role of Don Giovanni in Mozart's opera, serenading a woman with a mandolin. This used to be the common picture of the mandolin, an obscure instrument of romance in the hands of a Spanish nobleman.

The mandolin is a modern member of the lute family, dating back to Italy in the 18th century. The instrument was played across Europe but then heavily declined in usage after the Napoleonic Wars. Credit for creating the modern bowlback version of the instrument goes to the Vinaccia family of Naples. The deep bowled mandolin, especially the Neapolitan form, became common in the 19th century, following the appearance of an international hit, the Spanish Students. They toured Europe and America, and their performances created a stir that helped the mandolin to become widely popular.

Although the modern instruments date to the 18th century, ancestral instruments of similar construction and range, the mandore and gittern, were used across Europe (including Spain, Italy, England, France, Germany and Poland) centuries earlier. These instruments developed from short-handled lutes that entered Christian Europe from Muslim Sicily and Spain. Muslims picked these instruments in Central Asia, calling them barbat and oud. Residents of Asia were playing them as far back as the 2nd century A.D.

== Early precursors ==
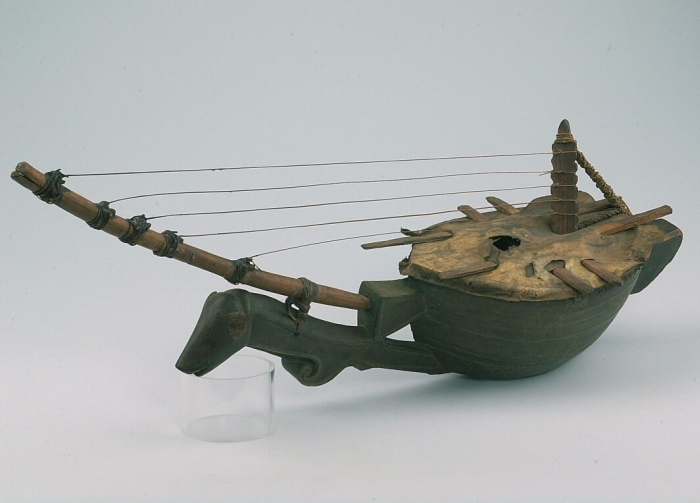
Bow Harp or Harp Lute, West Africa

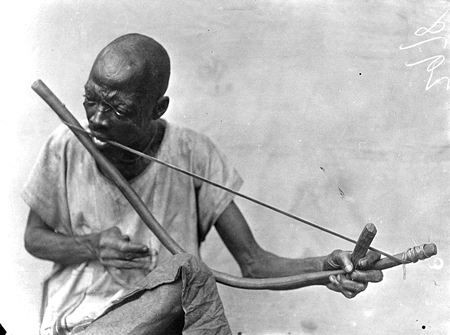
Musical bows have survived in some parts of Africa.

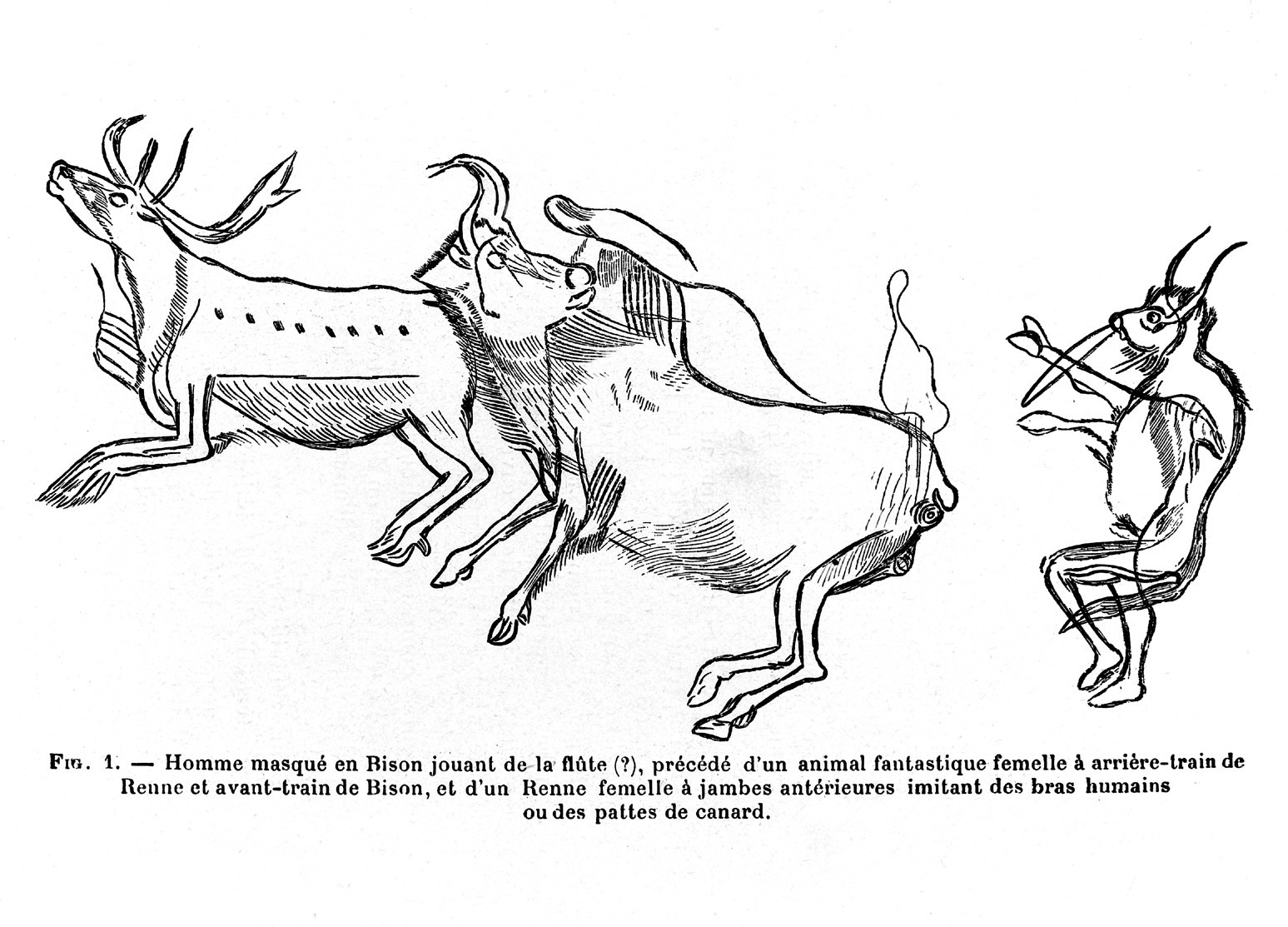
Hunting bow or musical instrument on cave wall

Dating to c. 13,000 BC, a cave painting in the Trois Frères cave in France depicts what some believe is a musical bow, a hunting bow used as a single-stringed musical instrument. From the musical bow, families of stringed instruments developed; since each string played a single note, adding strings added new notes, creating bow harps, harps and lyres. In turn, this led to being able to play dyads and chords. Another innovation occurred when the bow harp was straightened out and a bridge used to lift the strings off the stick-neck, creating the lute.

This picture of musical bow to harp bow is theory and has been contested. In 1965 Franz Jahnel wrote his criticism stating that the early ancestors of plucked instruments are not currently known. He felt that the harp bow was a long cry from the sophistication of the 4th-century BC civilization that took the primitive technology and created "technically and artistically well made harps, lyres, citharas and lutes."

=== First lutes ===
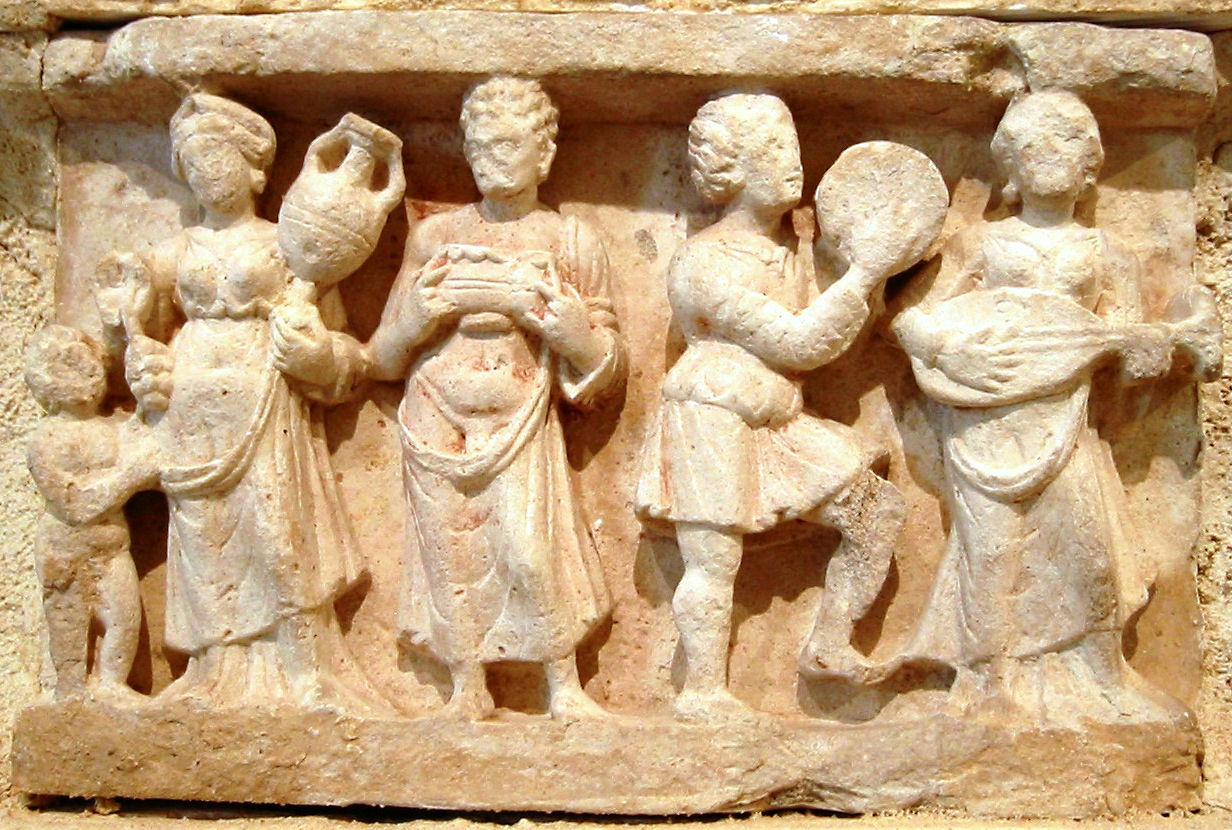
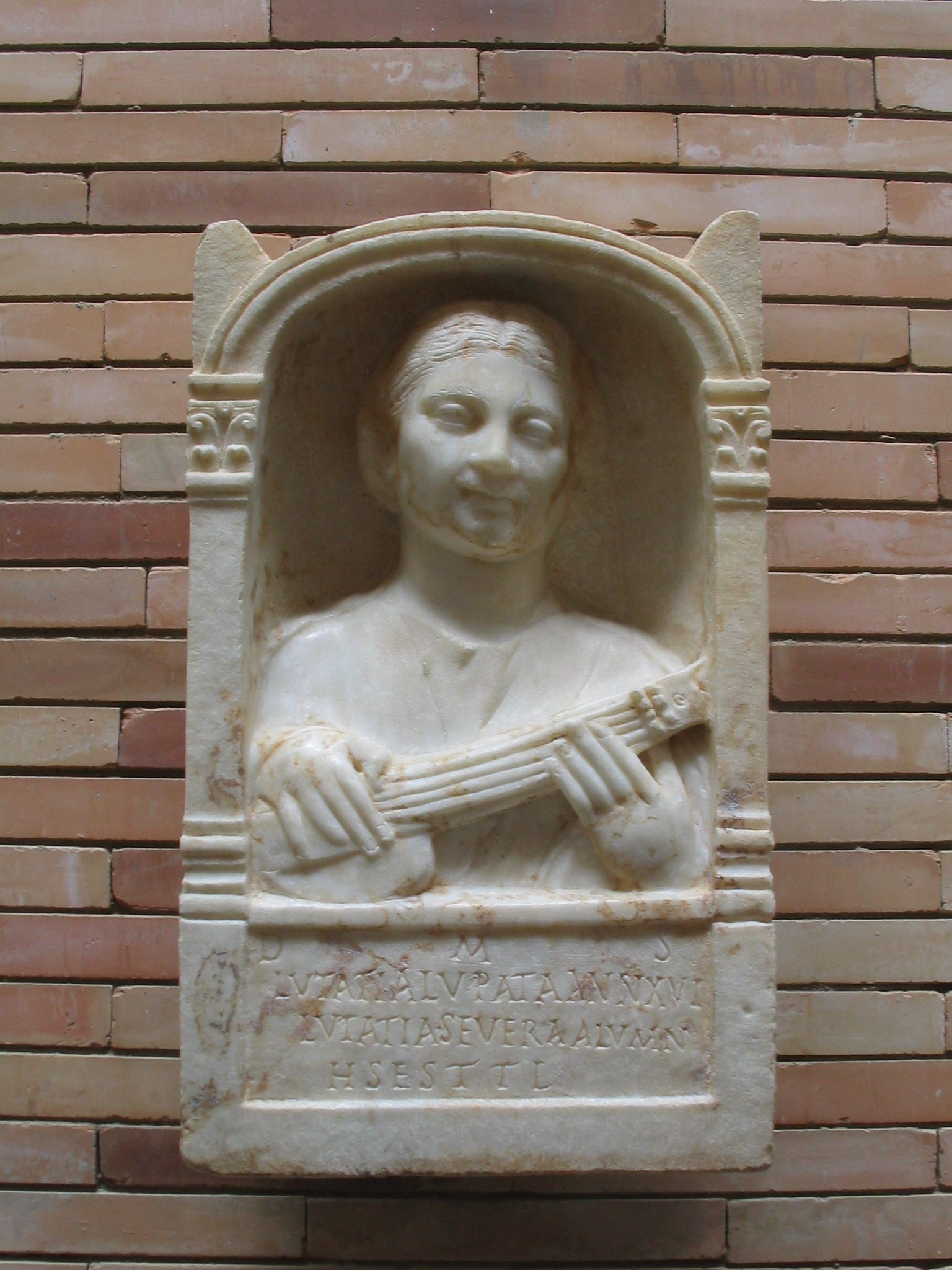
(Left): Hellenistic banquet scene from the 1st century AD, Hadda, Gandhara. Lute player far right.; (right): Spanish stele of a girl with a pandura, 2nd century A.D.

Musicologists have put forth examples of that 4th-century BC technology, looking at engraved images that have survived. The earliest image showing a lute-like instrument came from Mesopotamia prior to 3000 BC. A cylinder seal from c. 3100 BC or earlier (now in the possession of the British Museum) shows what is thought to be a woman playing a stick lute. From the surviving images, theorists have categorized the Mesopotamian lutes, showing that they developed into a long variety and a short. The line of long lutes may have developed into the tamburs and pandura. The line of short lutes was further developed to the east of Mesopotamia, in Bactria, Gandhara, and Northwest India, and shown in sculpture from the 2nd century BC through the 4th or 5th centuries AD.

=== Persian barbat, Arab oud ===
==== Andalusia ====
Early Spanish and Italian lutes
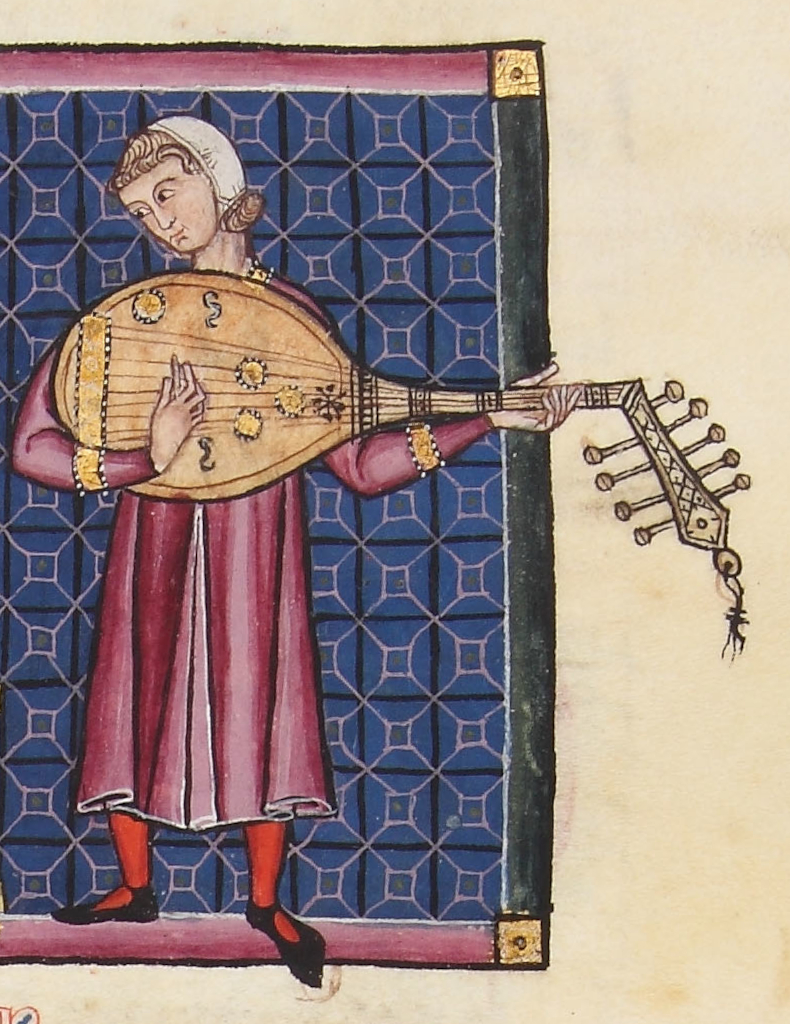
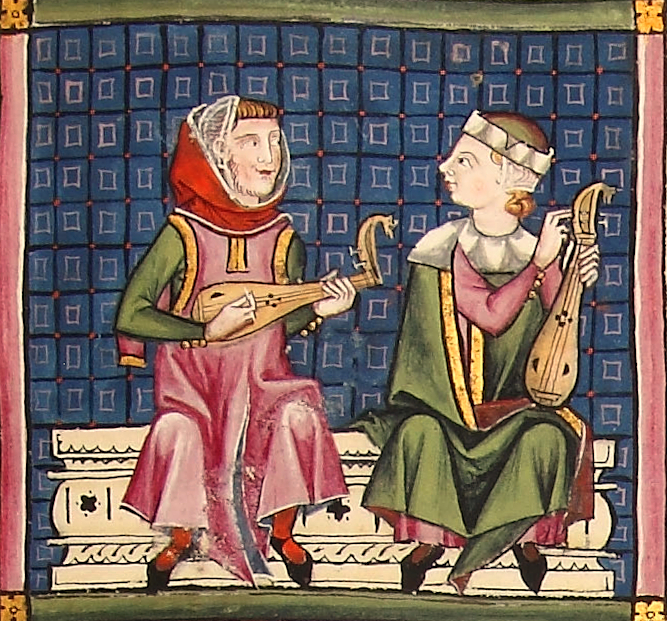
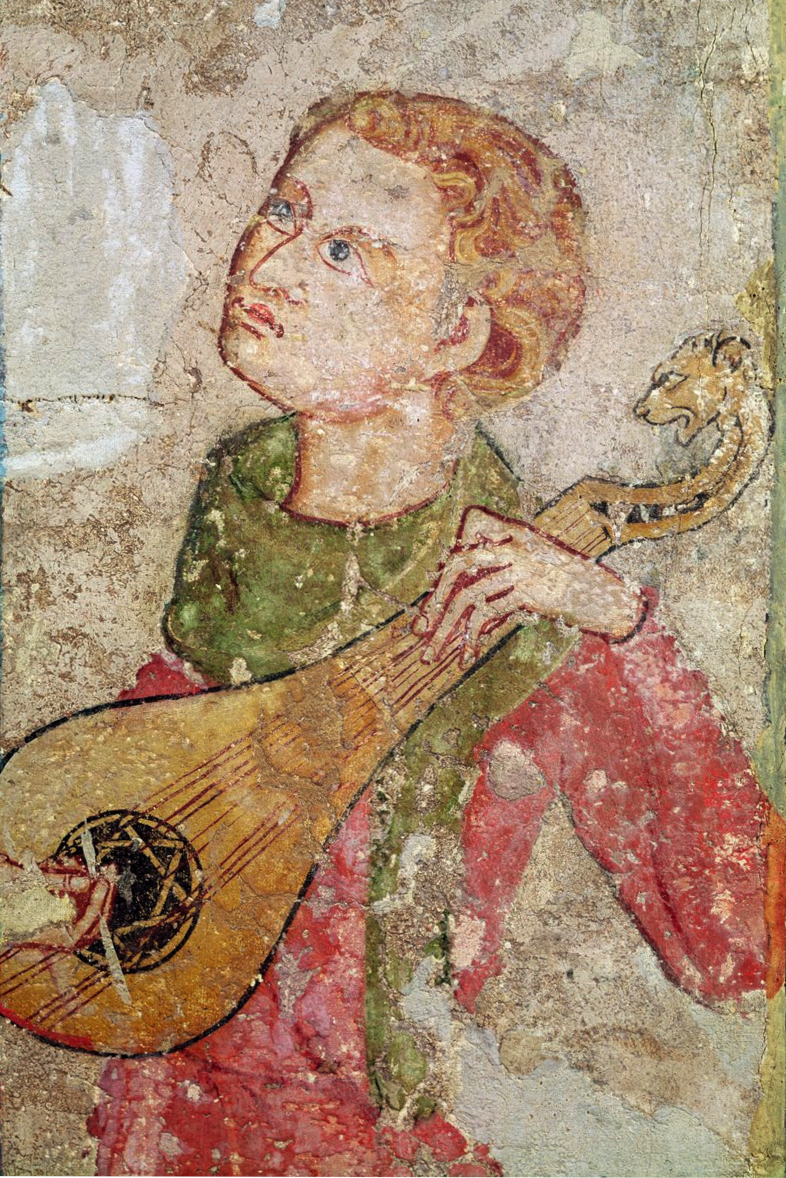
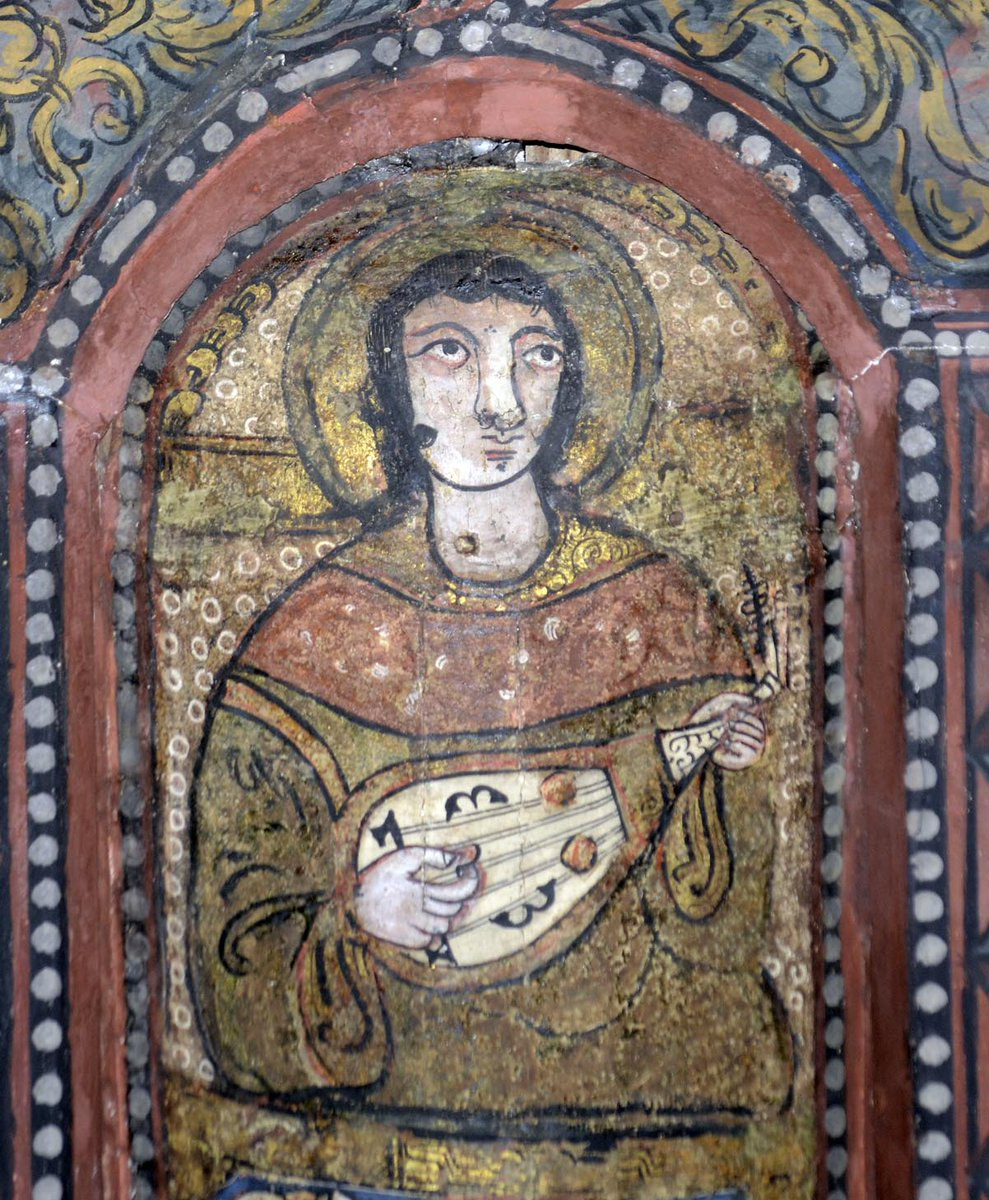
Fltr: 1: A European lute player from the Cantigas de Santa Maria, late 13th century. Round "rose" soundholes were a Christian feature.; 2: The Cantigas of Santa Maria (c. 1260) shows musicians with three-string instruments, shaped like a small 4-course gittern or rebec.; 3: Juan Oliver's c. 1330 painting at Pamplona Cathedral, showing a musician playing a gittern; 4: Oud or lute painted in the Cappella Palatina in Sicily, 12th century.

Bactria and Gandhara became part of the Sasanian Empire (224–651 AD). Under the Sasanians, a short almond shaped lute from Bactria came to be called the barbat or barbud, which was developed into the later Islamic world's oud or ud. When the Moors conquered Andalusia in 711 AD, they brought their ud along, into a country that had already known a lute tradition under the Romans, the pandura.

During the 8th and 9th centuries, many musicians and artists from across the Islamic world flocked to Iberia. Among them was Abu l-Hasan ‘Ali Ibn Nafi‘ (789–857), a prominent musician who had trained under Ishaq al-Mawsili (d. 850) in Baghdad and was exiled to Andalusia before 833 AD. He taught and has been credited with adding a fifth string to his oud and with establishing one of the first schools of music in Córdoba.

By the 11th century, Muslim Iberia had become a center for the manufacture of instruments. These goods spread gradually to Provence, influencing French troubadours and trouvères and eventually reaching the rest of Europe.

==== From Sicily to Germany ====
Beside the introduction of the lute to Spain (Andalusia) by the Moors, another important point of transfer of the lute from Arabian to European culture was Sicily and the earlier Emirate of Sicily, where it was brought either by Byzantine or later by Muslim musicians. There were singer-lutenists at the court in Palermo following the Norman conquest of the island from the Muslims, and the lute is depicted extensively in the ceiling paintings in the Palermo’s royal Cappella Palatina, dedicated by the Norman King Roger II of Sicily in 1140. His Hohenstaufen grandson Frederick II, Holy Roman Emperor (1194 - 1250) continued integrating Muslims into his court, including Moorish musicians. Frederick II made visits to the Lech valley and Bavaria between 1218 and 1237 with a "Moorish Sicilian retinue." By the 14th century, lutes had disseminated throughout Italy and, probably because of the cultural influence of the Hohenstaufen kings and emperor, based in Palermo, the lute had also made significant inroads into the German-speaking lands. By 1500 the valley and Füssen had several lute-making families, and in the next two centuries the area hosted "famous names of 16th and 17th century lutemaking".

=== European lute beginnings ===
A distinct European tradition of lute development is noticeable in pictures and sculpture from the 13th century onward. As early as the beginning of the 14th century, strings were doubled into courses on the miniature lute or gittern, used throughout Europe. The small soundhole shaped like a "3" or a "W", typical of Muslim-made instruments and seen in the Cantigas de Santa Maria illustrations on instruments played by Europeans, were not typical of European instruments. Instead the European instruments largely used a C-, D- or B-shaped soundhole, or a round soundhole, which might be covered with a rose decoration. The gittern is first seen in 13th century art. It developed into the mandore (French name) by the late 16th century and was known in German as the mandoer, Spanish vandola, and Italian mandola.

== Development in Italy, birth of Neapolitan mandolin ==
Mandolino, mandolin
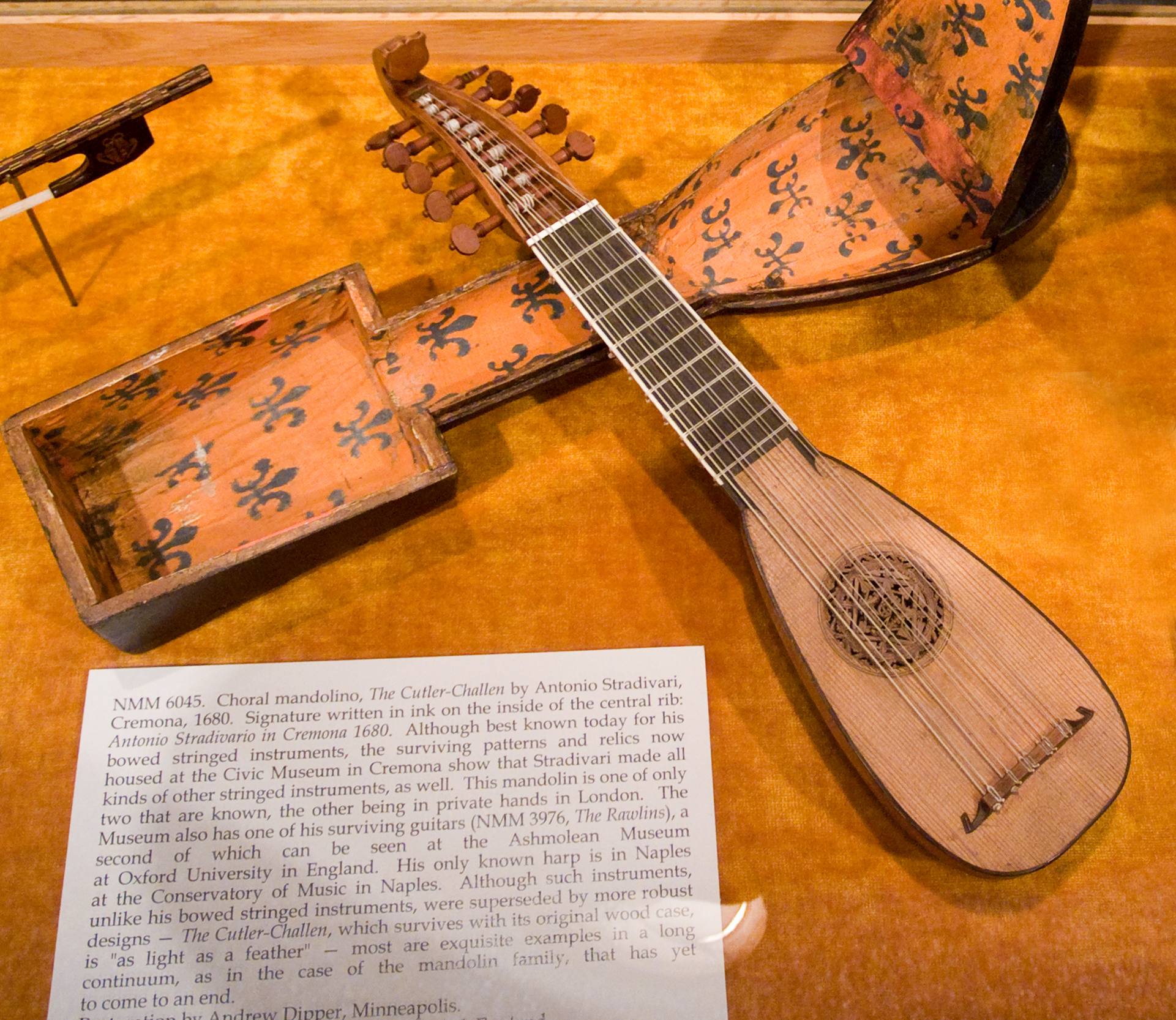
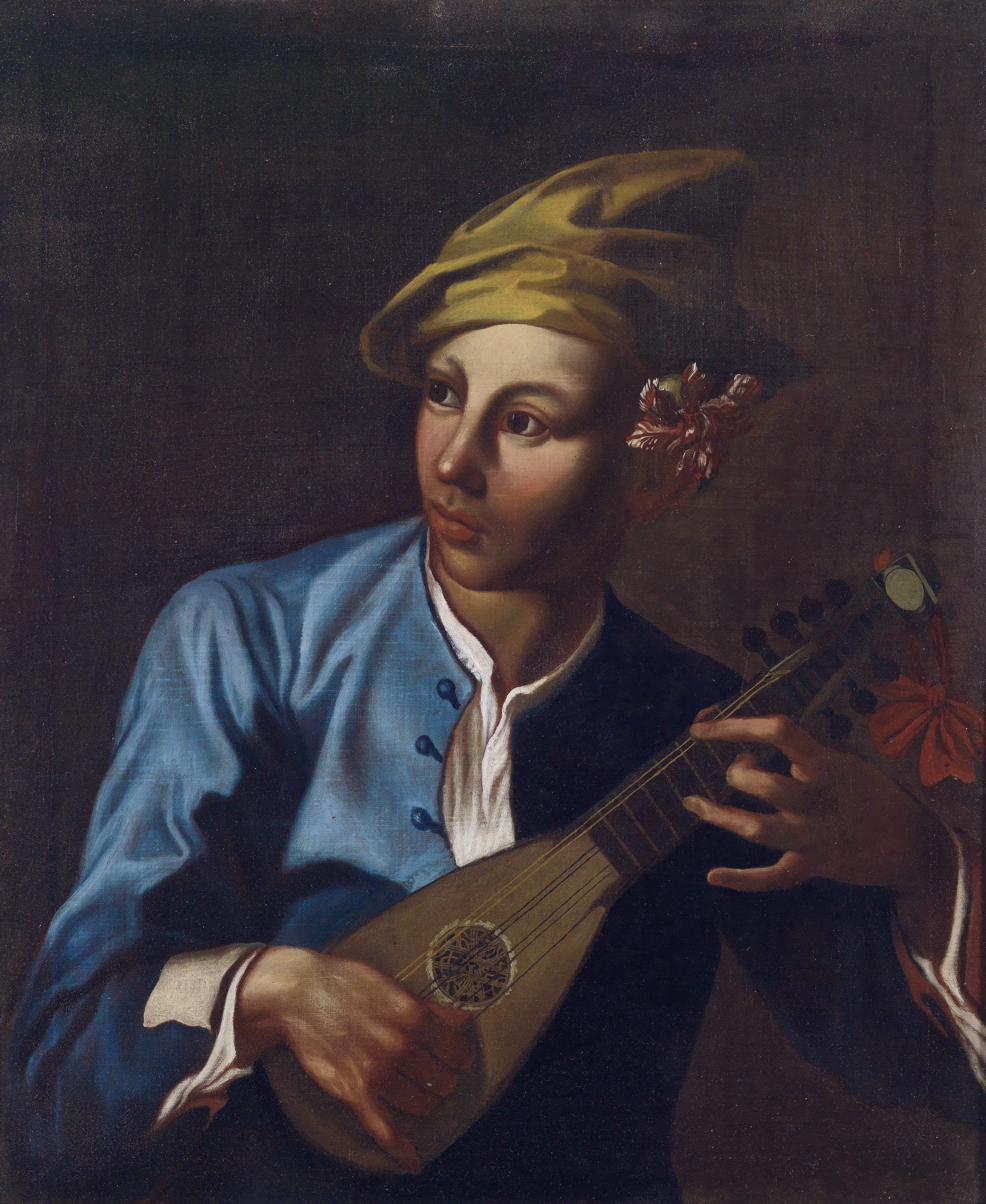
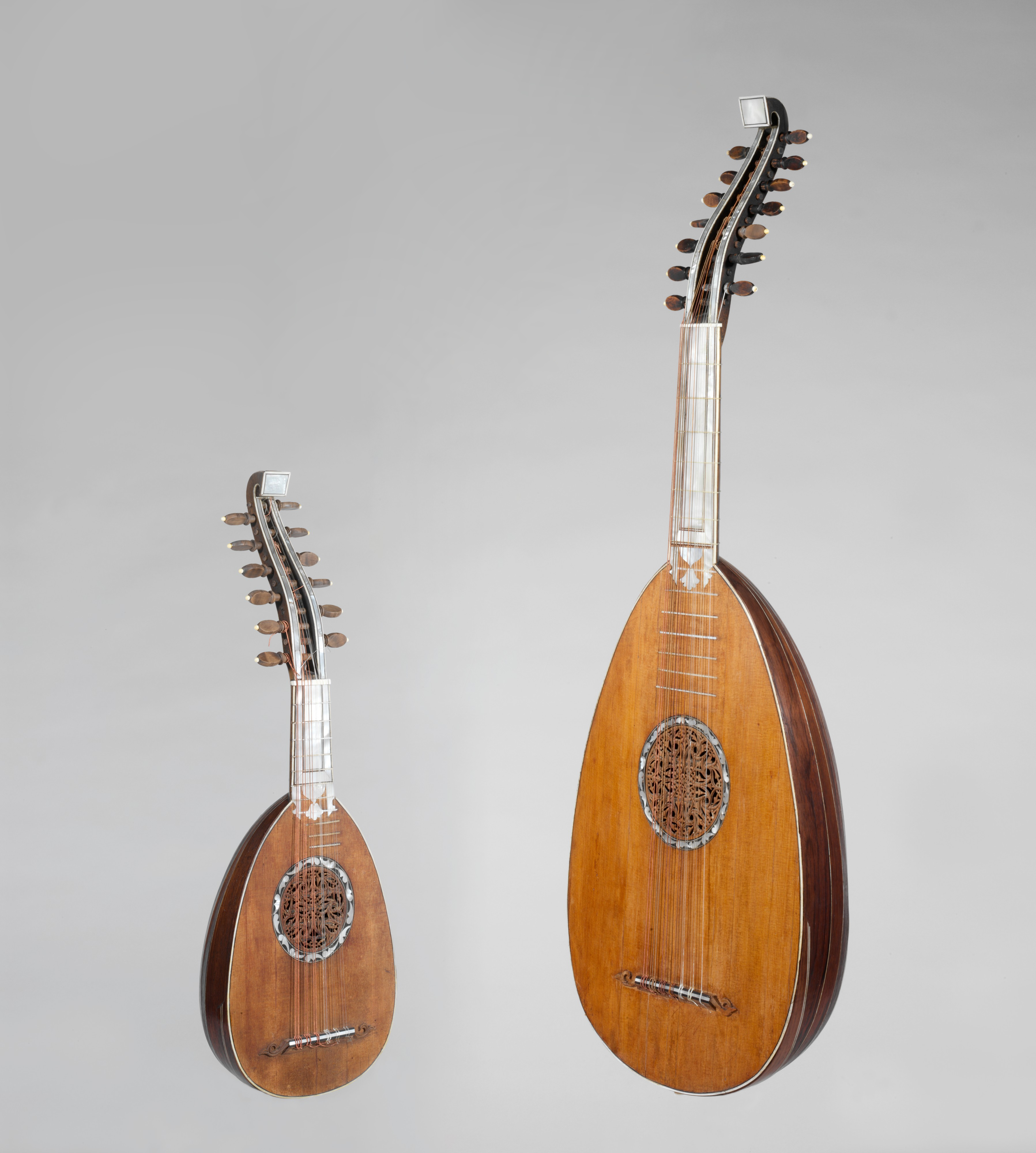
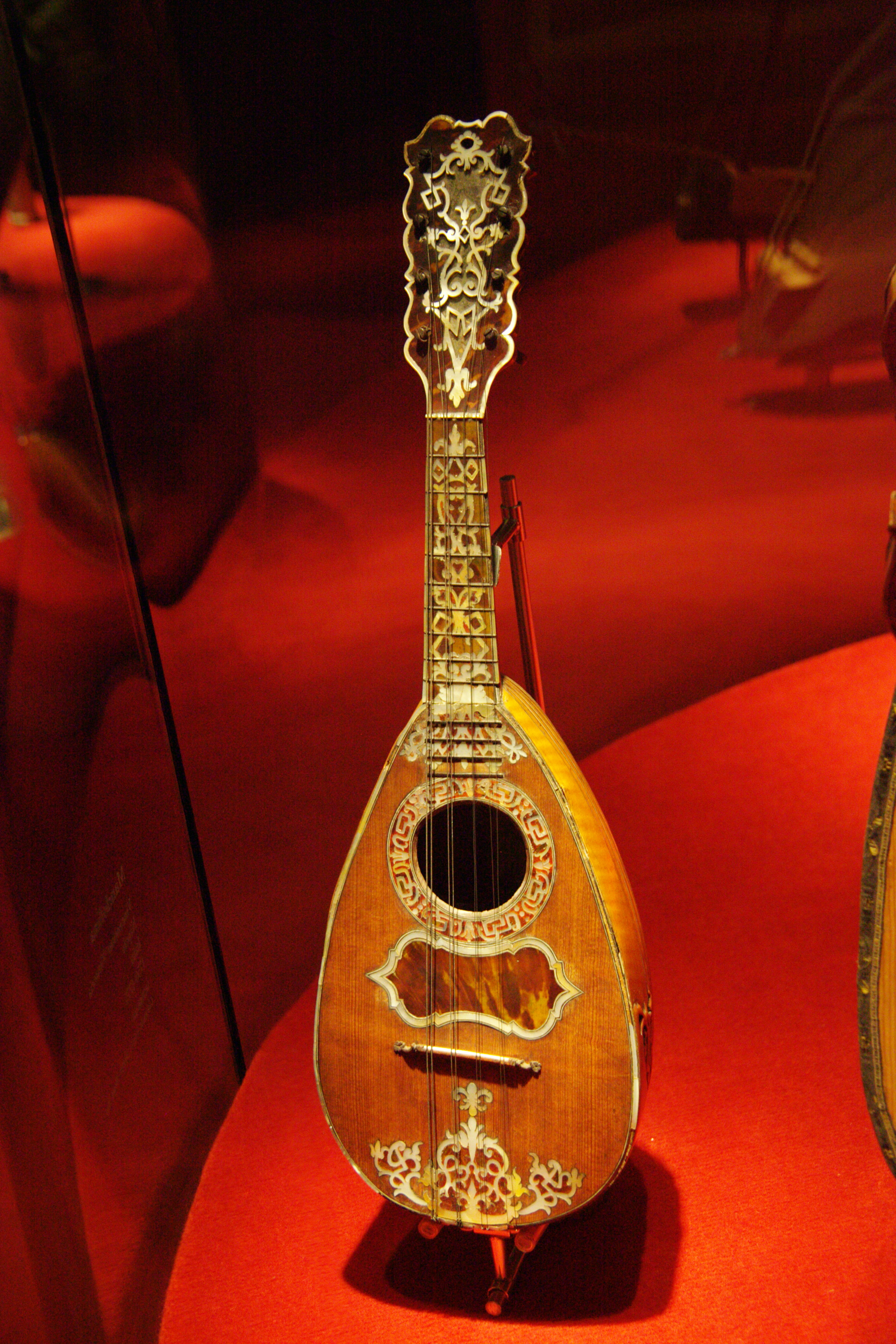
Fltr: 1: Mandolino made in Cremona, Italy by Antonio Stradivari, c. 1680. (501.9 mm x 111 mm. Scale length 315.8 mm.) May have had a pegboard instead of the instrument's current pegbox.; 2: Mandolino player, c. 1736. Painting by Giacomo Francesco Cipper; 3: Lombardic mandolin and mandola, Milan late 1790s. The mandola is 91 x 31.6 cm, scale length 59.5 cm. The mandolin is 56.3 x 19.9 cm, scale 31.5 cm.; 4: Neapolitan mandolin (metal strings) made between 1767 and 1784 by Vicenzo Vinaccia. (585 mm x 180 mm, scale length 330 mm.)
The instruments predating the 18th century mandolinos, the gittern, mandore, mandora and mandola were instruments averaging 300-400 mm in scale length. As the term mandolino came into use in the 1700s to describe the baroque version (315 mm scale length) of these earlier small instruments, the terms mandola and mandora began to be applied to instruments nearly double the mandolino's size. Neapolitan mandolins were from 315-330 mm scale length.

When the word "mandolin" is said in the 21st century, it usually refers to an instrument with 8 strings tuned in fifths, such as the Neapolitan mandolin or the American bluegrass mandolin. It is also commonly thought that mandolino is a diminutive of mandola, and that therefore the mandolino was a smaller development of the mandola.

The path from mandola to the modern mandolin was not simple; in the late 19th and early 20th centuries, there were varieties of mandolin with different characteristics. As historians sorted instruments and traditions, it became understood that the current mandolin may not be a true descendant of the mandola, and that it may represent a blending of instrument-making traditions.

The mandore or mandola of the 16th and 17th centuries was not the final form. It was redesigned in Northern Italy. The mandola had a flat soundboard with glued-on bridge, a peg box angled backwards, and lateral tuning pegs. The new instrument was smaller but retained the flat soundboard with glued-on bridge, and was called the little mandola or "mandolino." From it came the Milanese mandolin and later the Lombardy mandolin, with both instruments keeping the glued-on bridge. The catgut-strung mandolino and later Milanese and Lombardy mandolins were strung in 4, 5 or 6 courses tuned in fourths: e′–a′–d″–g″, b–e′–a′–d″–g″ or g–b–e′–a′–d″–g″, and played finger-style.

German historian Konrad Wölki said that these fourths-tuned mandolins were the instruments to which the name mandolino originally applied, but as other small, plucked and (to him) unrelated instruments were developed in Italy, the name transferred across to them. Wölki felt that the Florentine and Neapolitan mandolins were "not genuine descendants of the mandola." He considered the chitarra battente to be a prototype for Neapolitan mandolin (because of the shape of the soundboard and the way strings were attached to the bottom, and because it had a flat, angled pegboard instead of peghead) and the Florentine mandolin (because of the longer neck).

Musician and musical historian Alex Timmerman does not draw hard lines in his chart, "The Italian Mandolin, its evolution, nomenclature and types." He makes an effort to show relations between the generations of the instruments, from the mandola in the 1650s to the mandolins of the present day. The chart shows mandolinos as predecessors to the lines of mandolins, and possible points-of-blending of instrument features.

In one example on Timmerman's chart, makers of the mandolino (with bridge glued to the soundboard) blended it with the chittara battuta which had a floating bridge. The floating bridge was held to the soundboard by pressure from the strings attached to the instrument's body. The chitarra battente also had a soundboard that bent upwards to withstand string pressure of metal strings, instead of the mandolino's flat soundboard. Instruments in this tradition include the Neapolitan mandolin, Roman mandolin, Genovés mandolin and Sicilian mandolin. Similarly, the chart shows a possible blending of the mandolino and colascione to create the longer-necked Florentine mandolin, the Brescian mandolin and the Cremonese mandolin, all which retained the mandola's glued down bridge.

=== Vinaccia family, first metal-string mandolins ===
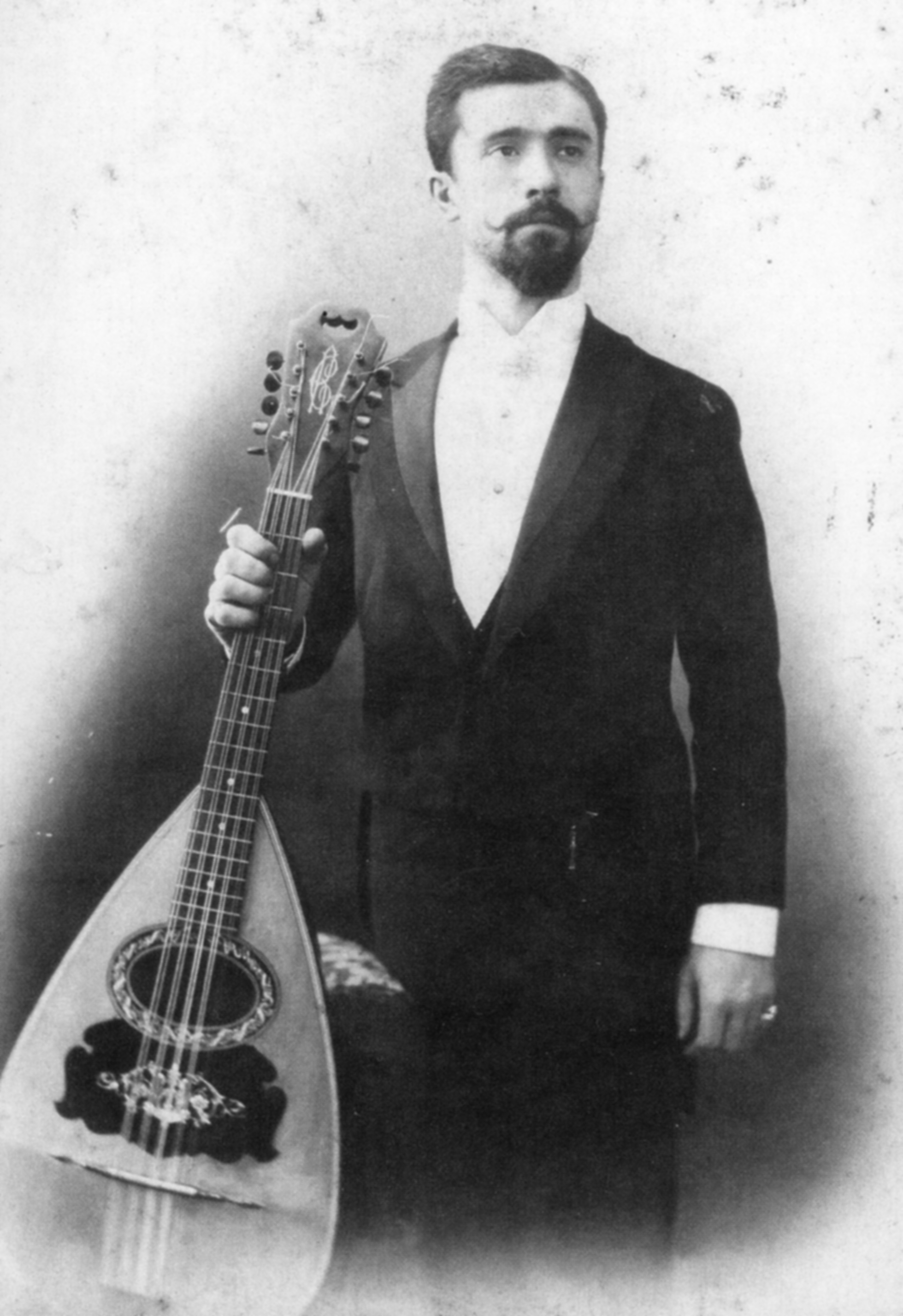
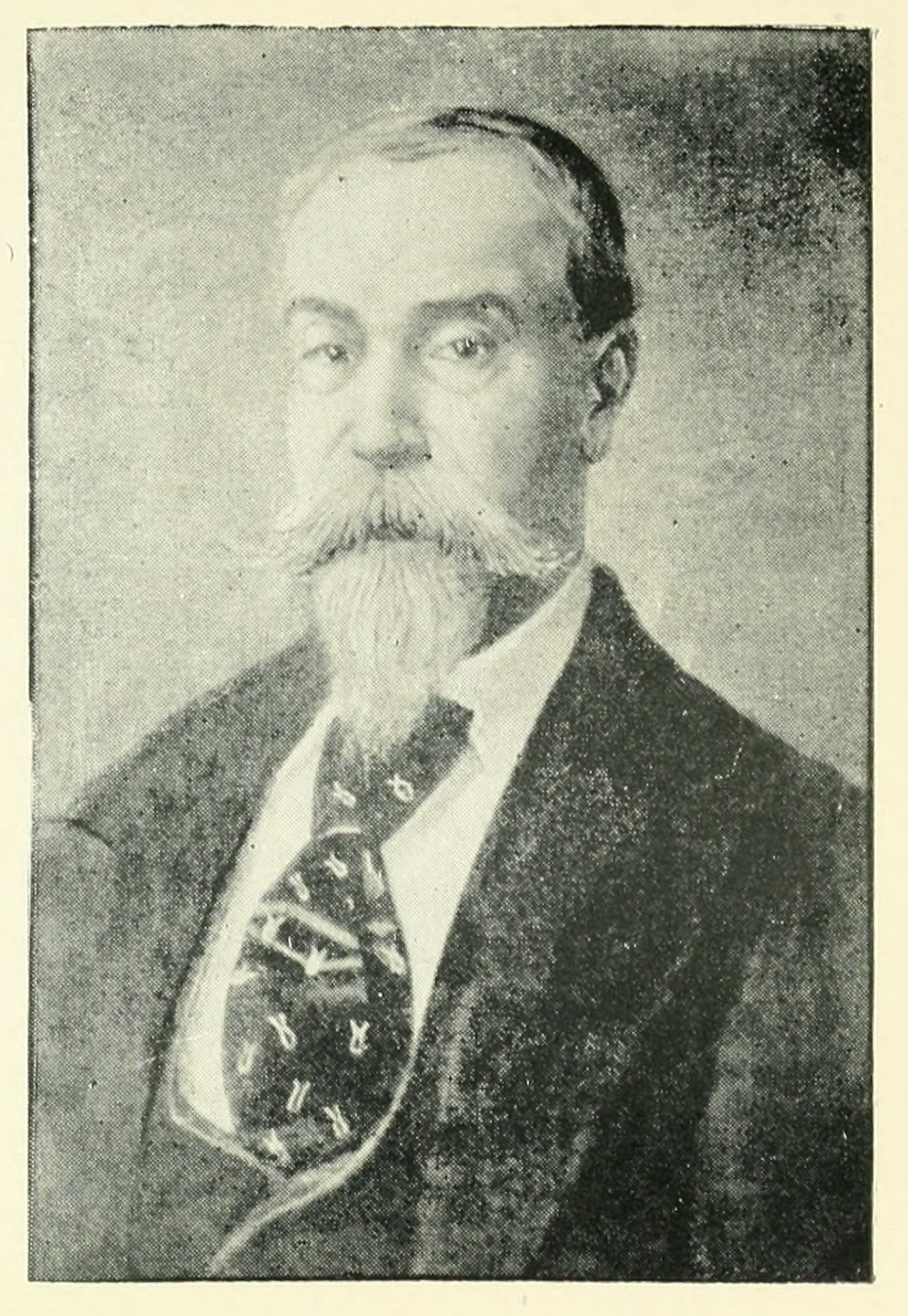
(Left): Luthier and mandolin virtuoso, Raffaele Calace, with his mandolin-family creation, the liuto cantabile; (right): Pasquale Vinaccia, "perfector of the modern Italian mandolin".

The first evidence of modern metal-string mandolins is from literature regarding popular Italian players who travelled through Europe teaching and giving concerts. Notable are Gabriele Leone, Giovanni Battista Gervasio, Pietro Denis, who travelled widely between 1750 and 1810. This, with the records gleaned from the Italian Vinaccia family of luthiers in Naples, Italy, led some musicologists to believe that the modern steel-string mandolins were developed in Naples by the Vinaccia family.

Not limited to mandolins, the Vinaccias made stringed instruments, including violins, cellos, guitars, mandolas and mandolins. Noted members of the family who made mandolins are known today from labels inside of surviving instruments and include Vincenzo, Giovanni, Domenico, and Antonio (and his sons Gaetano and Gennaro, grandson Pasquale and great-grandsons Gennaro and Achille). The mandolins they made changed over generations, from mandolinos with flat soundboards and gut-strings, through mandolins with a bent soundboard and bronze or bronze-and-gut strings, into mandolins with bent soundboards that used steel or steel-and-bronze strings.

Pasquale Vinaccia (1806–c. 1882), modernized the mandolin, adding features, creating the Neapolitan mandolin c. 1835. Pasquale remodeled, raised and extended the fingerboard to 17 frets, introduced stronger wire strings made of high-tension steel and substituted a machine head for the friction tuning pegs, then standard. The new wire strings required that he strengthen the mandolin's body, and he deepened the mandolin's bowl, giving the tonal quality more resonance. He did not introduce the bent soundboard, as it was present in some of the instruments made by the previous generation for bronze strings.

=== Calace, Embergher and others ===
Other luthiers who built mandolins included Raffaele Calace (1863 onwards) in Naples, Luigi Embergher (1856–1943) in Rome and Arpino, Giovanni Kasermann (1881-1965) in Naples, the Ferrari family (1716 onwards, also originally mandolino makers) in Rome, and De Santi (1834–1916) in Rome. Names of other mandolin luthiers from this era include Carlo Guadagnini (son of Giovanni Battista Guadagnini) and Gaspare Ferrari, both of whom have instruments in the collection of the Music Museum in Venice. The Neapolitan style of mandolin construction was adopted and developed by others, notably in Rome, giving two distinct but similar types of mandolin – Neapolitan and Roman.

== Rising and falling fortunes ==
=== First wave ===
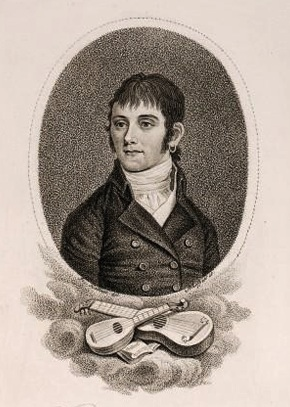
Bartolomeo Bortolazzi

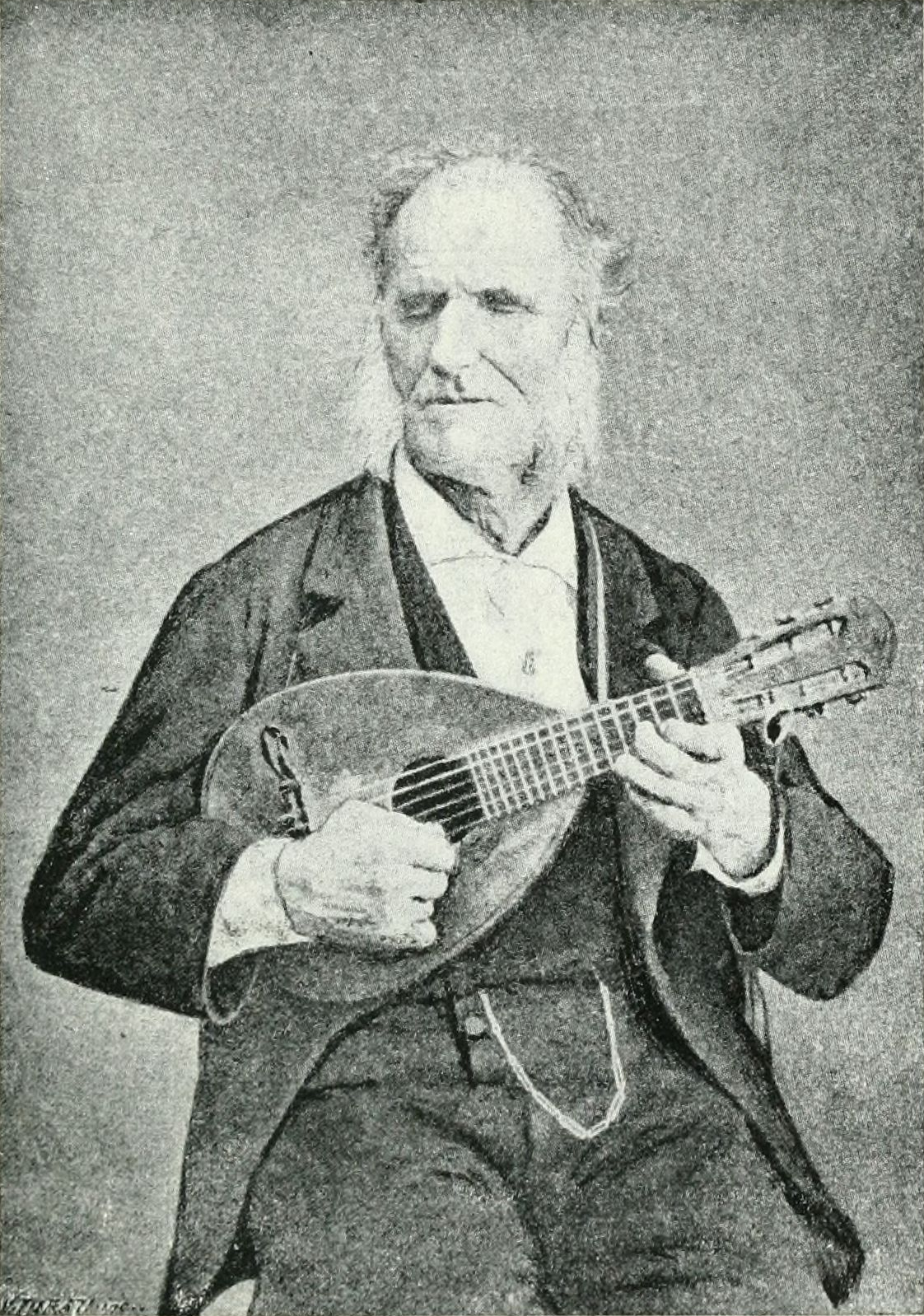
Giovanni Vailati, "Blind mandolinist of Cremona," toured Europe in the 1850s.

The transition from the mandolino to the mandolin began around 1744 with the designing of the metal-string mandolin by the Vinaccia family, 3 brass strings and one of gut, using friction tuning pegs on a fingerboard that sat "flush" with the sound table. The mandolin grew in popularity over the next 60 years, in the streets where it was used by young men courting and by street musicians, and in the concert hall. After the Napoleonic Wars of 1815, however, its popularity began to fall. The 19th century produced some prominent players, including Bartolomeo Bortolazzi of Venice and Pietro Vimercati. However, professional virtuosity was in decline, and the mandolin music changed as the mandolin became a folk instrument; "the large repertoire of notated instrumental music for the mandolino and the mandoline was completely forgotten". The export market for mandolins from Italy dried up around 1815, and when Carmine de Laurentiis wrote a mandolin method in 1874, the Music World magazine wrote that the mandolin was "out of date." Salvador Léonardi mentioned this decline in his 1921 book, Méthode pour Banjoline ou Mandoline-Banjo, saying that the mandolin had "lost for a time the great popularity it once enjoyed."

It was during this slump in popularity (specifically in 1835) that Pasquale Vinaccia made his modifications to the instrument that his family made for generations, creating the Neapolitan mandolin. The mandolin was largely forgotten outside Italy by that point, but the stage was set for it to become known again, starting with the Paris Exposition in 1878.

=== Second wave, the Golden Age of mandolins ===
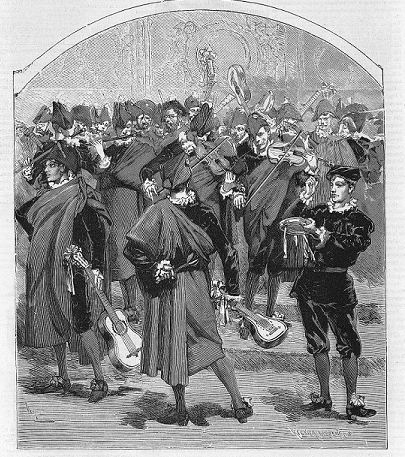
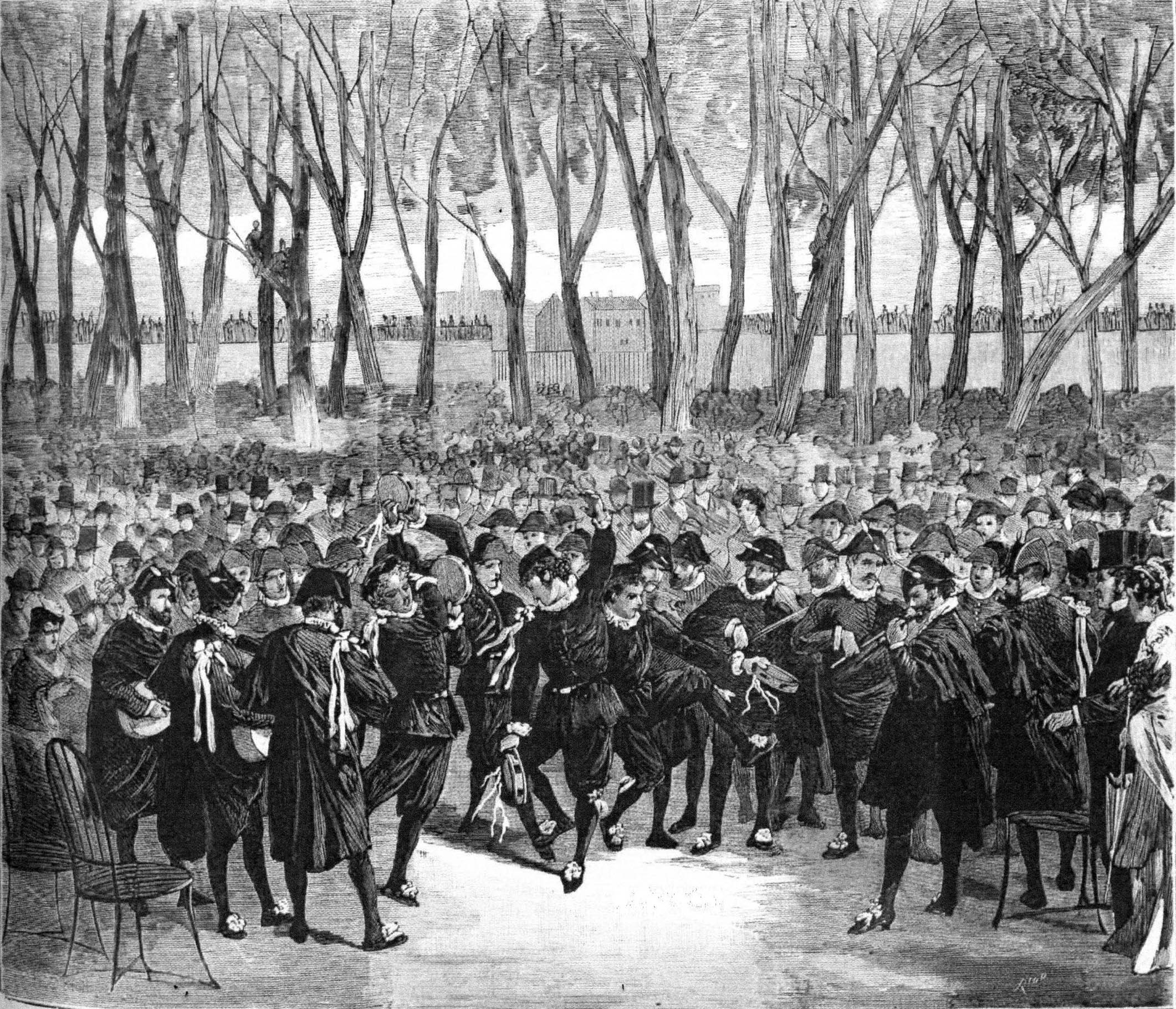
(Left): 64 members of the Estudiantina Espagnola at the Carnival de Paris, shown March 16, 1878. A bandurria is visible, bottom-center; (right): the Parisian crowd with the Estudiantina Espanola (playing national airs) in the Tuileries Gardens during Mardi Gras March 6, 1878, at the Tuileries Gardens. The crowd was estimated at 56,000 near the Café Riche Paris.

Beginning with the Paris Exposition of 1878, the instrument's popularity began to rebound. The Exposition was one of many stops for the Estudiantes Españoles (Spanish Students). There has been confusion regarding this group.

The original Estudiantes Española or Estudiantina Española was a group of 64 students formed by 26 February 1878, principally from Madrid colleges. They dressed in historical clothing, representing ancient sophists of Salamanca and Alcala and traveled to Paris for Carnival staying from March 2 through March 15. This early group of students played flutes, guitars, violins, bandurrias, and tambourines. This early group was led by Ildefonso de Zabaleta (president) and Joaquin de Castañeda (vice president). The group performed before large audiences in Paris (reports of 10,000 and 56,000 people showing up for a night's entertainment were reported).

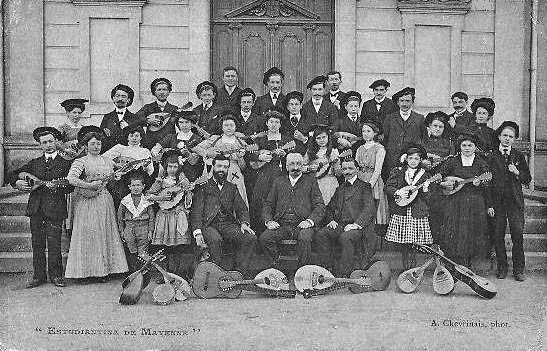
The Mandolin "Estudiantina" of Mayenne, France around 1900 when Mandolin orchestras were at the height of their popularity

Their success in Paris preceded a second group of Spanish performers, known as the Esudiantina Figaro or Esudiantina Española Figaroa (Figaro Band of Spanish Students). This group was founded by Dionisio Granados and toured Europe dancing and playing guitars, violins and the bandurria, which became confused with the mandolin.

Along with their energy and the newfound awareness of the instrument created by the day's hit sensation, a wave of Italian mandolinists travelled Europe in the 1880s and 1890s and in the United States by the mid-1880s, playing and teaching their instrument. The instrument's popularity continued to increase during the 1890s and mandolin popularity was at its height in the "early years of the 20th century." Thousands were taking up the instrument as a pastime, and it became an instrument of society, taken up by young men and women. Mandolin orchestras were formed worldwide, incorporating not only the mandolin family of instruments, but also guitars, double basses and zithers.

That era (from the late 19th century into the early 20th century) has come to be known as the "Golden Age" of the mandolin. The term is used online by mandolin enthusiasts to name the time period when the mandolin had become popular, when mandolin orchestras were being organized worldwide, and new and high-quality instruments were increasingly common.

After the First World War, the instrument's popularity again fell, though gradually. Reasons cited include the rise of Jazz, for which the instrument was too quiet. Also, modern conveniences (phonograph records, bicycle and automobiles, outdoor sports) competed with learning to play an instrument for fun.

=== Aftermath ===
The second decline was not as complete as the first. Thousands of people had learned to play the instrument. Even as the second wave of mandolin popularity declined in the early 20th century, players began using new versions of the mandolin in new forms of music. Luthiers created the resonator mandolin, the flatback mandolin, the carved-top or arched-top mandolin, the mandolin-banjo and the electric mandolin. Musicians began playing it in Celtic, Bluegrass, Jazz and Rock-n-Roll styles — and Classical too.

== See also ==
- Mandolins in North America
- Mandolin playing traditions worldwide
