= Carmine de Laurentiis =

Italian composer

Carmine de Laurentiis was a 19th-century Italian mandolinist, musical educator, author and composer who taught mandolin and guitar in Naples. His only well-known student was Carlo Munier. He wrote a mandolin method, Metodo per Mandolino, that was published in Milan in 1874, reported the following year in the Musical World. The article mentioning Laurentiis' method talked about the decline of the mandolin, calling the mandolin "entirely out of fashion."

His efforts helped to bring the mandolin back to international prominence after a period of international indifference, by teaching and promoting the instrument. His mandolin method was accessible not only for Italian speakers, but with the English addition compiled by Federico Sacchi, people in England as well.

== Decline of the mandolin ==
The mandolin was used internationally on the European continent in the mid 18th century up through the early 19th-Century, by Italian virtuoso-players touring Europe and giving concerts. Among them was Bartolomeo Bortolazzi Alexandro Marie Antoin Fridzeri, Pietro Vimercati, Luigi Castellaci, and Giovanni Vailati.

When the Napoleonic wars broke out, the mandolin went into a rapid decline, to the point that it was rarely seen in Europe outside of Italy. In Italy it was relegated to a folk instrument, frequently encountered in the hands of young men courting young women, and in cities it was in the hands of street musicians and beggars, a lower-class instrument. The untrained musicians concentrated on the romantic elements in the music, attempting to imitate a guitar's strum with arpeggios, or a violin by use of tremolo. Having become a folk instrument, the techniques demonstrated by the virtuosic mandolin masters disappeared.

== The mandolin's dark age and sudden rise ==
In the period from the end of the Napoleonic Wars until 1880 the mandolin was a forgotten fad, although mandolin music was made and consumed in Italy. It was seen on the streets in the hands of street musicians, and emigrants took it with them when they left Italy. Pasquale Vinaccia developed a more advanced mandolin, louder and with steel strings, now known as the Neapolitan Mandolin. Pasquale's grand-nephew, Carlo Munier, took lessons on the mandolin from "Maestro" Laurentiis.

Laurentiis wrote his 1874 mandolin method, Metodo per Mandolino. for an instrument that was labeled "entirely out of fashion." Six years later, the Golden Age of the Mandolin sprang seemingly out of nowhere, with performances at world exhibitions, new Italian virtuosos touring across Europe (especially Paris and Prague) and settling in the United States. Young women were buying up mandolins; music teachers needed methods to use in teaching the instruments. The virtuosos could write their own methods, but for those that did not, methods like Laurentiis' were already available.
