= Carlo Munier =

Italian musician

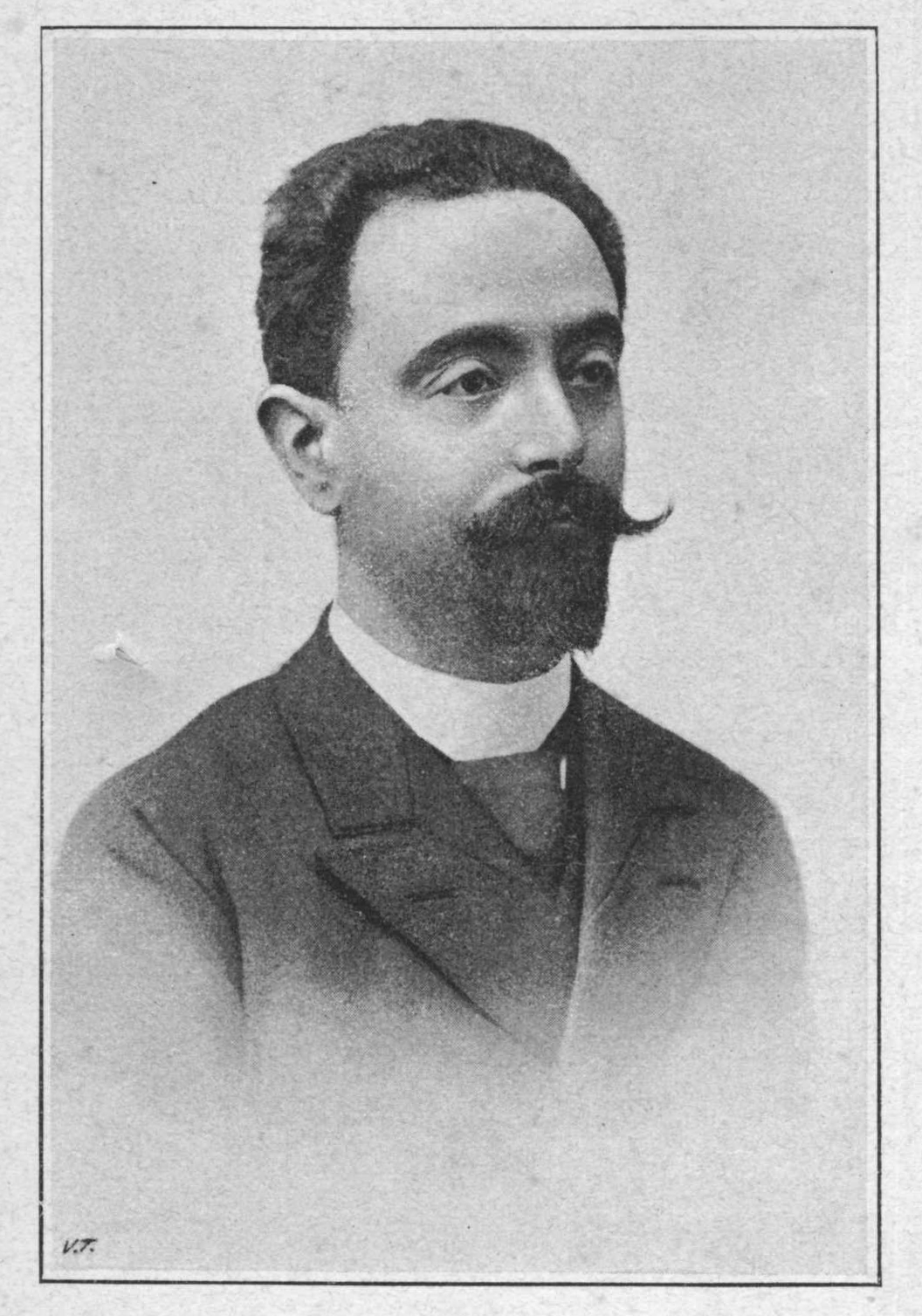
- Born: 15 July 1859; Naples
- Died: 11 February 1911 (aged 51); Florence
- Occupations: Mandolinist and composer
- Spouses: Luisa de Fonseca; Armida Bastianini
- Children: Luisa; Elena
- Parent(s): Vincenzo Munier; Rosa Vinaccia

Carlo Munier (15 July 1859 – 11 February 1911) was an Italian musician who advocated for the mandolin's acknowledgement among as an instrument of classical music and focused on "raising and ennobling the mandolin and plectrum instruments". He wanted "great masters" to consider the instrument and raise it above the level of "dilettantes and street players" where it had been stuck for centuries. He expected that the mandolin and guitar would be taught in serious orchestral music schools and incorporated into the orchestra. A composer of more than 350 works for the mandolin, he led the mandolin orchestra Reale circolo mandolinisti Regina Margherita named for its patron Margherita of Savoy and gave the queen instruction on the mandolin. As a teacher, he wrote Scuola del mandolino: metodo completo per mandolino (School for the mandolin, a complete method), published in 1895.

Silvio Ranieri described Munier in 1925 as one of the principal pioneers in the revival of the mandolin repertoire – a repertoire that with Munier began to move away from the limitations of the popular style (waltzes, serenades and fashionable marches) in order to approach the "art music" forms.

== Biography ==
Carlo Gennaro Pasquale Munier was born in Naples on 15 July 1859, son of Vincenzo Munier, a printer, and Rosa Vinaccia. Orphaned at a very young age, he was adopted by the relatives of his maternal grandfather, the noted luthier Pasquale Vinaccia. The Vinaccia family of Naples had been active as instrument makers since the first half of the 18th century, and Pasquale is considered today one of the fathers of the modern mandolin for his technical innovations for the instrument. Munier acknowledged the closeness of his relationship with the Vinaccia family in his several references to Pasquale Vinaccia in his Method for mandolin, and in his dedication of the Three Mazurkas Op. 116-118 for mandolin and guitar to his uncle Gennaro, son of Pasquale.

Growing up in the Vinaccia atelier, where he learned his first musical rudiments, Munier began to study the mandolin and the guitar with Carmine de Laurentiis, Neapolitan maestro of both instruments and author of the 1869 "Metodo per mandolino" published by Ricordi editions. Munier then enrolled in the S. Pietro Maiella Conservatory when he was 15, studying piano with the maestros Galiero and Cesi and harmony and composition with maestro Nicola D'Arienzo. He completed his studies at 19, winning awards in composition and harmony. In this period he performed at several concerts in Naples and published his first compositions, arrangements of La Traviata and I Puritani for two mandolins, mandola and piano, dedicating the last one to the Queen of Italy.

When he was 22 Munier moved to Florence, where he spent the rest of his life. He quickly gained a reputation as a virtuoso, becoming a guiding figure of the Florentine mandolin and guitar school, which also included such illustrious students as Queen Margherita. In 1890 he organized and conducted the first plucked string quartet, with Luigi Bianchi on first mandolin, Guido Vizzarri on second mandolin, Riccardo Matini on mandola and himself on liuto moderno. With this quartet he performed several concerts across Italy, popularizing this kind of ensemble. In 1892 the quartet won first prize in the National Competition of Genoa, over which the famous violinist Camillo Sivori presided. In the same competition Munier won the gold medal as mandolin player and composer performing his "Concerto in Sol maggiore". In October 1909 he performed for King Victor Emmanuel III, in the historical castle of Sommariva-Perno in Cuneo province, playing the "Prelude in Re maggiore" and the Mazurka-Concert "A Lei!". The king complimented Munier on the execution of the pieces and the extraordinary effects he obtained with the mandolin.

In autumn 1910, Munier left for a European tour that made stops in Marseille and Antwerp. In Marseille, he met his mandolinist friend Laurent Fantauzzi to whom he told of his plan to organize an impressive concert in Florence. Unfortunately, he never realized the event; on his return to Florence Munier contracted an unexpected illness and died on 10 February 1911.

Munier first married Luisa De Fonseca, who died young and to whom he dedicated Elegia op 148. He then married Armida Bastianini with whom he had two daughters, Luisa and Elena.

== Compositions ==
Munier was a prolific composer. His catalogue includes more than 350 published works. With the exception of a few works, including the "Trio for mandolin, violoncello and piano" and the "Three quartets for 2 mandolins, mandola and lute", Munier wrote primarily for mandolin and guitar. His production of methods was also remarkable: the Metodo completo for mandolin in two volumes; Lo Scioglidita in four volumes and the Venti Studi. His ouvre also included didactic works like the "Lezioni in Forma di Duetto" Op. 115 and the Opere per Due Mandolini (Op. 220, 228 and 230).

Ten or twelve years ago the publication of a Method like this one would have been a useless proposition. At that time the mandolin was little known whereas now it has attained its rightful place in the art of music. In fact, many people dedicate themselves to studying it with constant passion, therefore the need for a "Complete Method" for a guide to lead one without difficulties to perfect execution"

— Carlo Munier, Florence, July 1891

=== Krick's selections ===
==== Educational works ====
In the Etude magazine, January 1941, George C. Krick selected a group of Munier's works as "his most important compositions."

- Mandolin Method (Scuola del Mandolino) in two volumes, containing over two hundred pages of study material with Italian, French and English text.
- La Scioglidita, supplement to the mandolin method, four books of progressive exercises covering all phases of mandolin technic
- Opus 216, twenty studies for advanced students.
- Op. 115, lessons in the form of duets
- Op. 228, duets for two mandolins in first position
- Op. 220, duets in first to third position
- Op. 228, duets in all positions
- Opus 230, a book of ten classic arrangements for three mandolins

==== String quartets ====
these are scored for two mandolins, mandola and lute or mandocello, with optional parts for guitar or piano.

- Op. 76, in G-major
- Op. 128, in D-major
- Op. 203, in C-major

==== Mandolin solo with piano accompaniment ====
- First Concerto in G major
- Capriccio Spagnolo
- First and Second Mazurka Concertos
- Valzer Concerto
- Aria Variata
- Rossiniana Fantasia
- Bizzaria-Capriccio Concerto
- Scene de Ballet de Beriot
- Canto d'Amore, mandolin duo for unaccompanied mandolins.

== Bibliography ==
- Sparks, Paul (2003). The Classical Mandolin. Oxford: Oxford University Press. ISBN 9780195173376.
- Bone, Philip J (1914). The guitar & mandolin biographies of celebrated players & composers. London: Schott. ISBN 9780195173376.
- Krick, George C (January 1941). "Carlo Munier, Mandolinist and Composer". The Etude. LIX (1): 62–63. Archived from the original on 2011-07-10.

== See also ==
- List of mandolinists (sorted)
