= Pasquale Vinaccia =

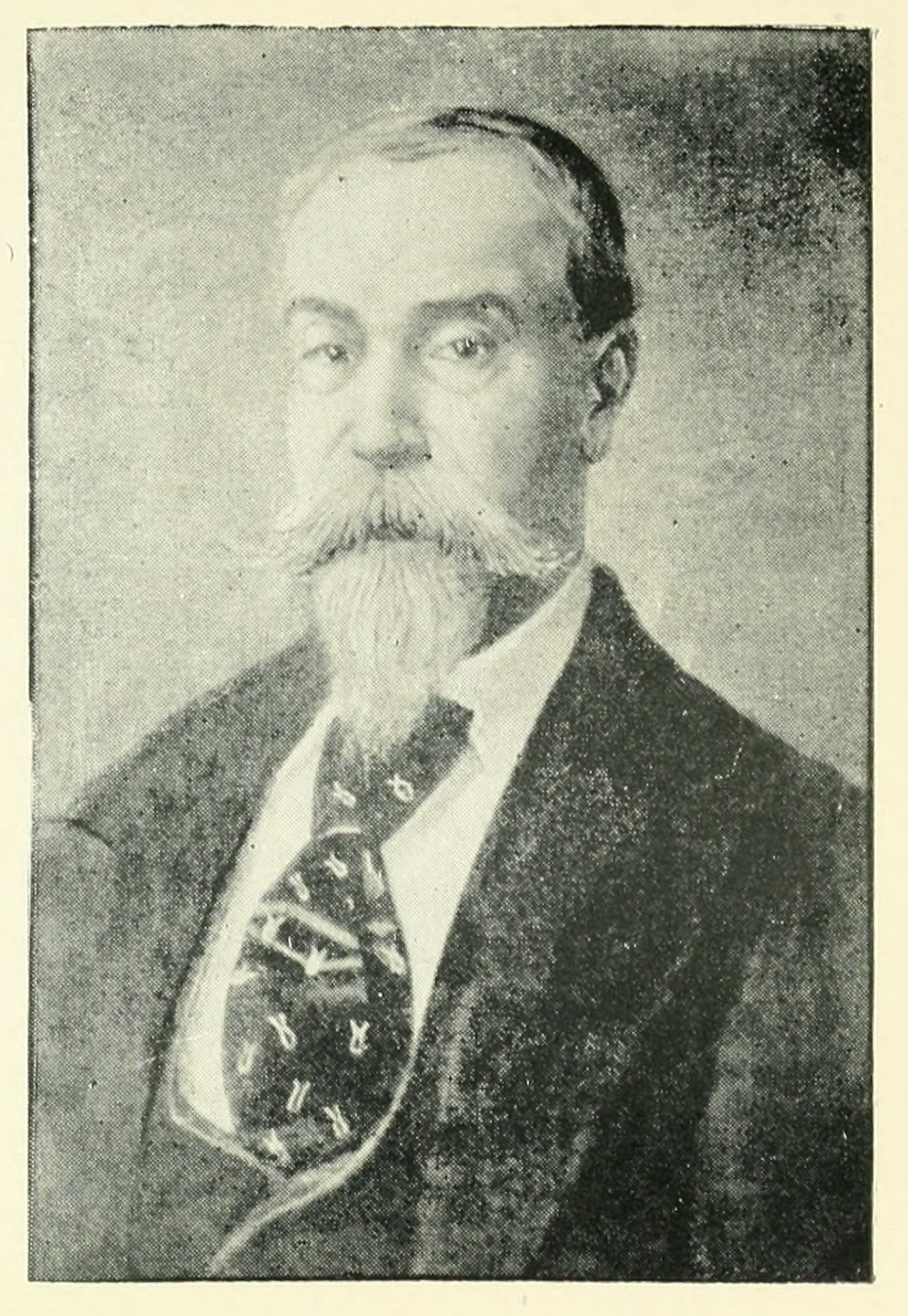
- Pasquale Vinaccia, luthier and creator of the Neapolitan Mandolin.
- Born: 20 July 1806; Italy
- Died: c. 1882; Italy
- Occupation: Luthier
- Known for: creating the "Neapolitan Mandolin"

Pasquale Vinaccia (1806 – c. 1882) was an Italian luthier, appointed instrument-maker for the Queen of Italy, and maternal grandfather to Carlo Munier. In 1835 he improved the mandolin, creating a version of the instrument that used steel wires for strings, known today as the "Neapolitan Mandolin." His use of steel strings has become the dominant way of stringing mandolins.

== Developing the mandolin ==
The first evidence of modern metal-string mandolins is from literature regarding popular Italian players who travelled through Europe teaching and giving concerts. Notable are Gabriele Leone, Giovanni Battista Gervasio, Pietro Denis, who travelled widely between 1750 and 1810. This, with the records gleaned from the Italian Vinaccia family of luthiers in Naples, Italy, led some musicologists to believe that the modern steel-string mandolins were developed in Naples by the Vinaccia family. Pasquale was born into this musical instrument making family and was the son of Gaetano Vinaccia.

Not limited to mandolins, the Vinaccias made stringed instruments, including violins, cellos, guitars, mandolas and mandolins. Noted members of the family who made mandolins are known today from labels inside of surviving instruments and include Vincenzo, Giovanni, Domenico, and Antonio (and his sons Gaetano and Gennaro, grandson Pasquale and great-grandsons Gennaro and Achille). The mandolins they made changed over generations, from mandolinos with flat soundboards and gut-strings, through mandolins with a bent soundboard and bronze or bronze-and-gut strings, into mandolins with bent soundboards that used steel or steel-and-bronze strings.

Pasquale modernized the mandolin by raising and extending the fingerboard to 17 frets and introducing the stronger wire strings made of high-tension steel. He substituted a machine head for the friction tuning pegs that were standard in the early 19th Century. The new wire strings required that he strengthen the mandolin's body, and he deepened the mandolin's bowl, giving the tonal quality more resonance.

His own sons, Gennaro and Achille, were also luthiers. Instruments were made into the 1880s bearing the label Pasquale Vinaccia and sons. He had two daughters Teresa and Rosa. Rosa was the mother of mandolinist virtuoso Carlo Munier.

== Elder family and cousins ==
There is confusion currently as to the name of the eldest Vinaccia luthier. His name has been put forth as Gennaro Vinaccia (c.1710-c.1788) (active c. 1755-c. 1778) and Nic. Vinaccia.

His son Antonio Vinaccia (1734-1796) was active c. 1756 to c. 1784. An early extant example of a mandolin is one built by Antonio Vinaccia in 1759, which resides at the University of Edinburgh. Another is by Giuseppe Vinaccia, built in 1893, is also at the University of Edinburgh. The earliest extant mandolin was built in 1744 by Antonio's son, Gaetano Vinaccia. It resides in the Conservatoire Royal de Musique in Brussels, Belgium.

== Gallery ==
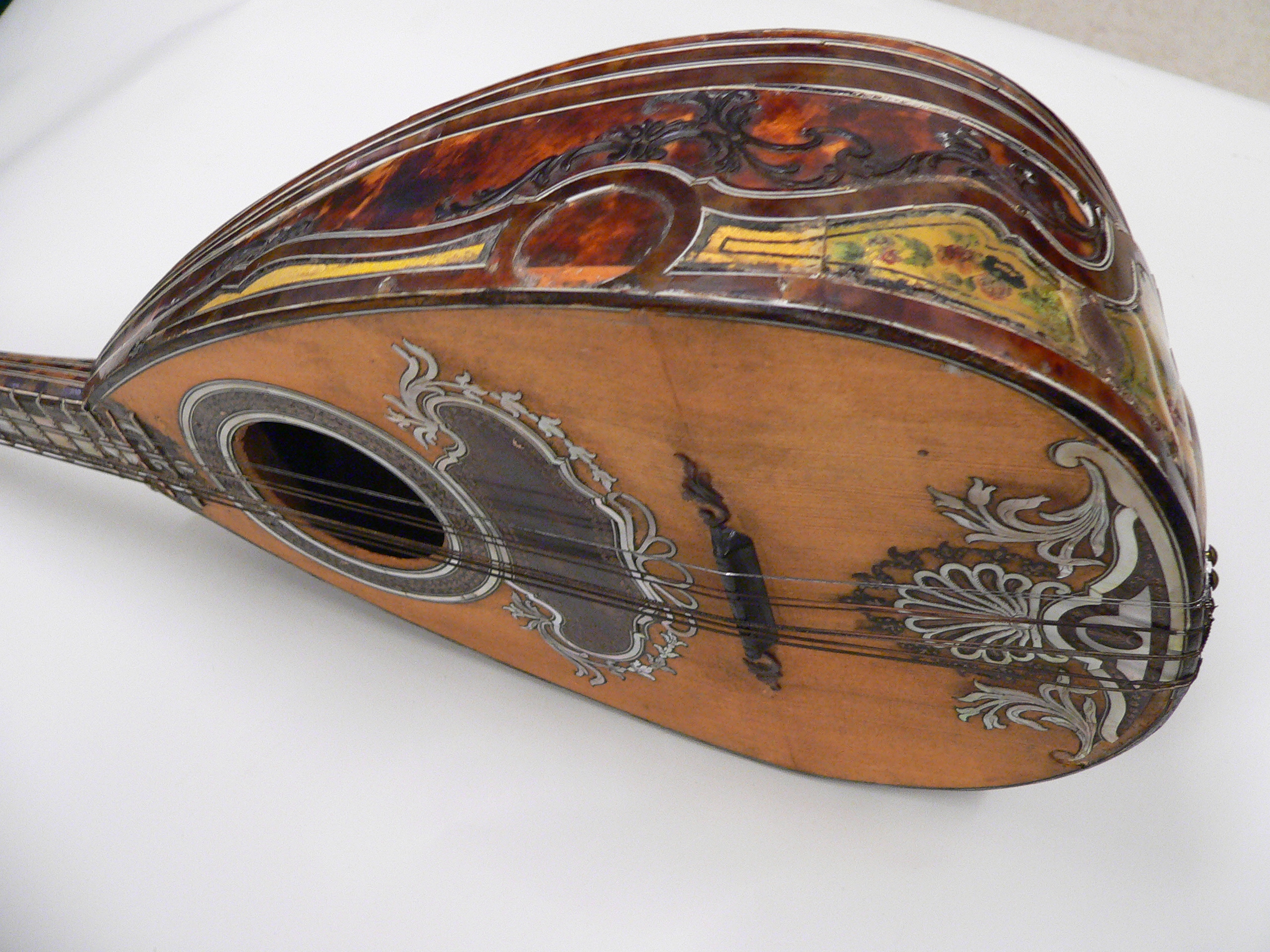
Antonius Vinaccia 3/4 angle

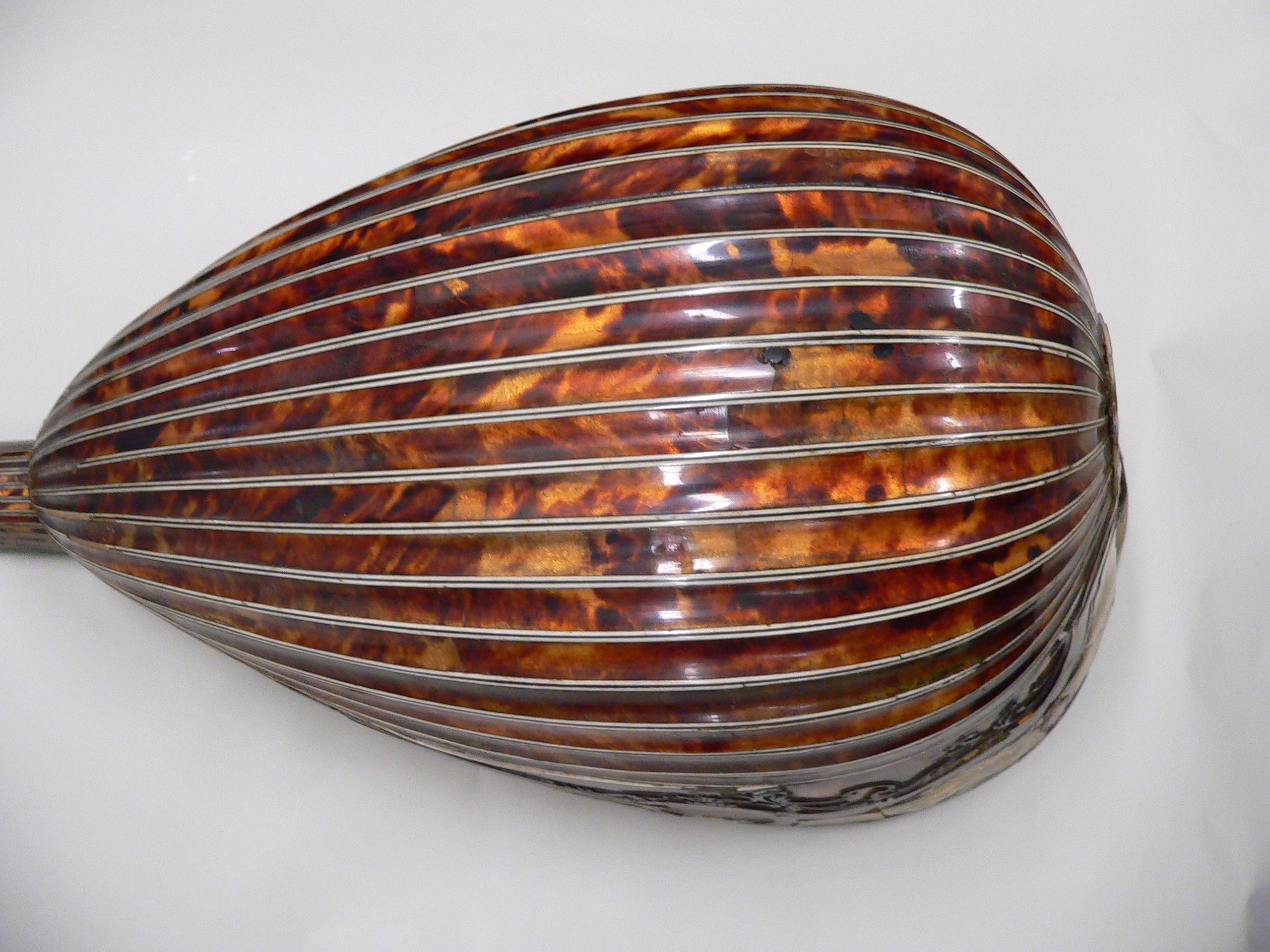
Antonius Vinaccia mandolin back

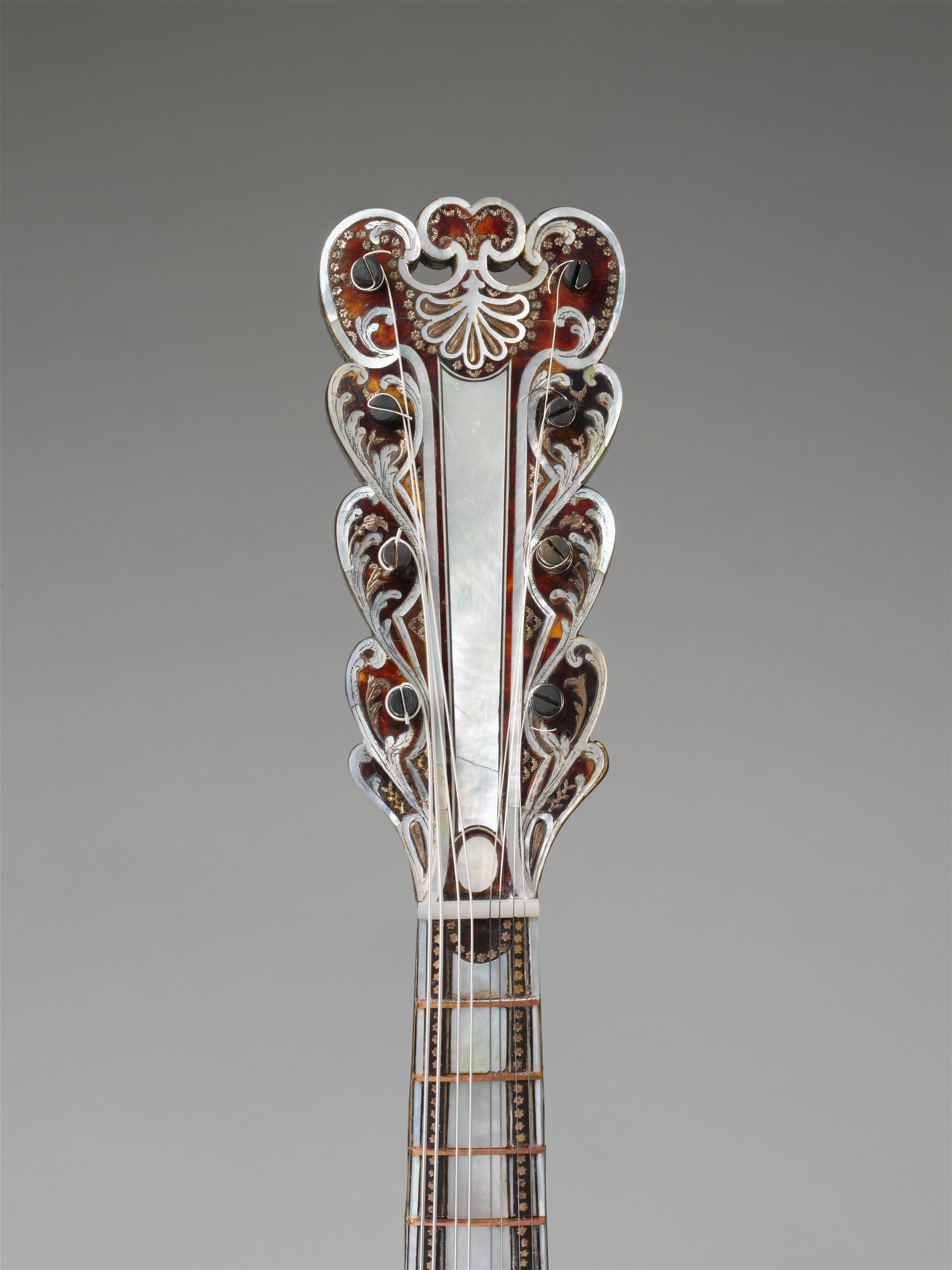
Antonius Vinaccia mandolin neck and peghead

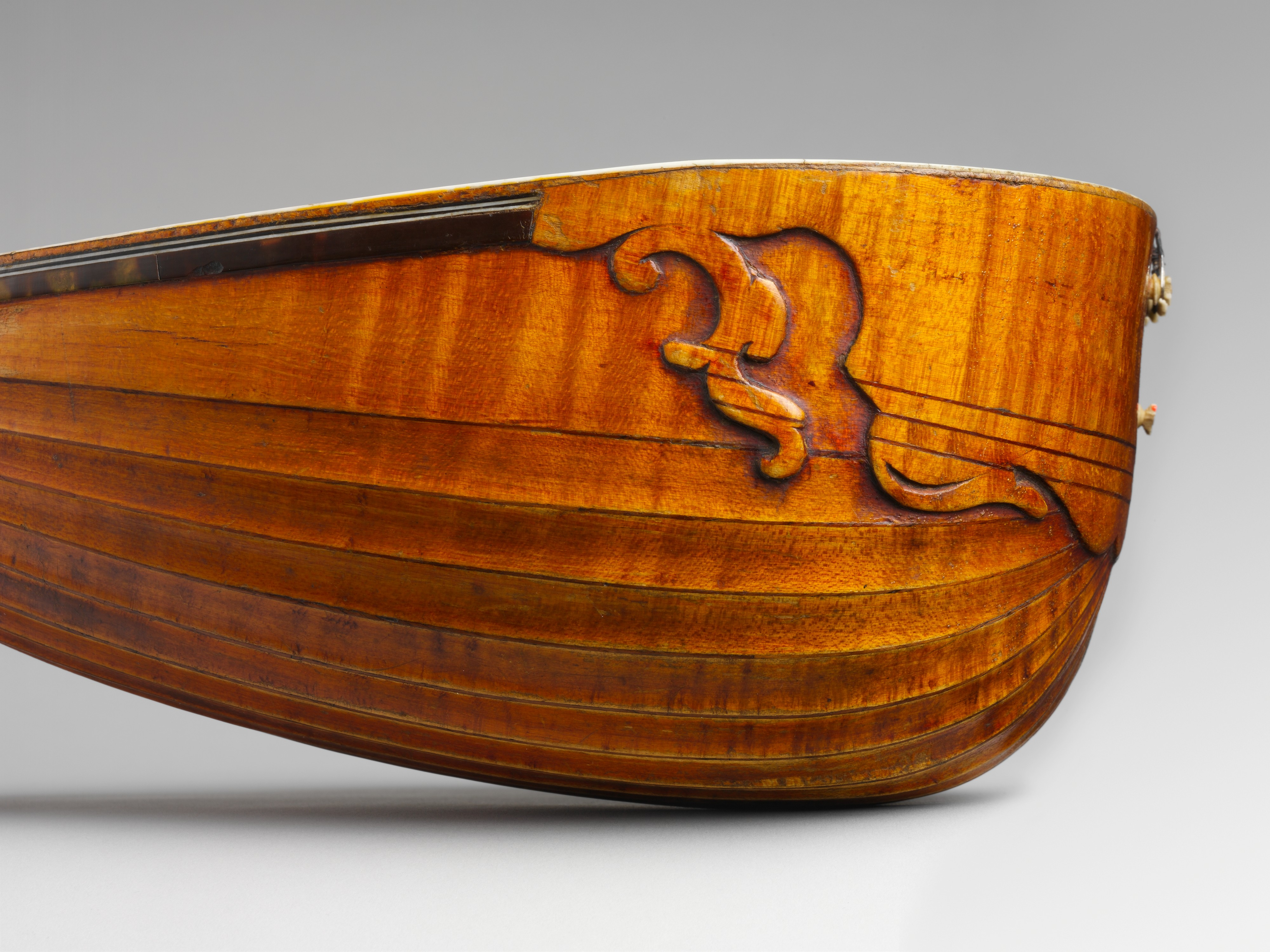
Vincentius Vinaccia mandolin, detail

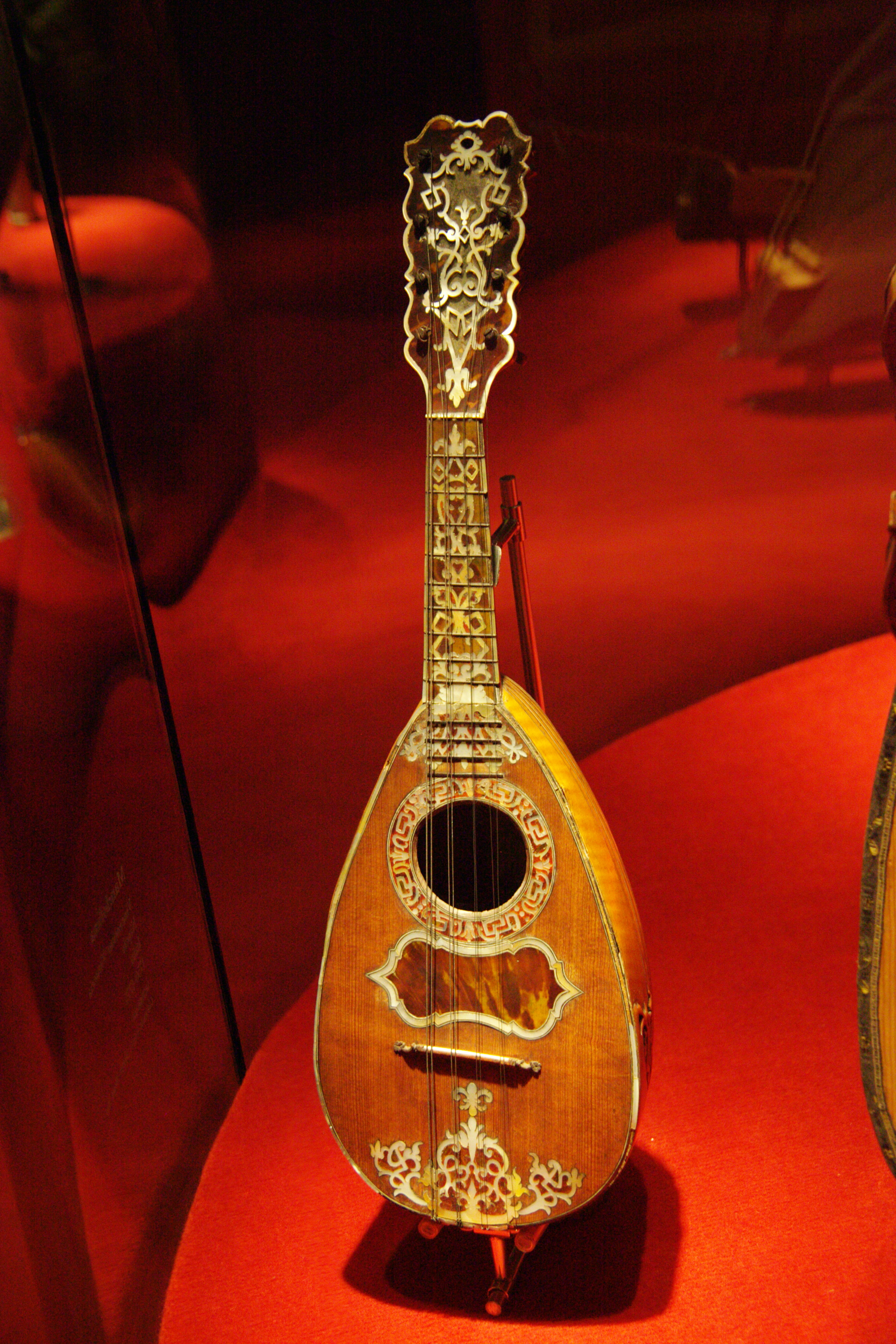
Vincenzo Vinaccia mandolin

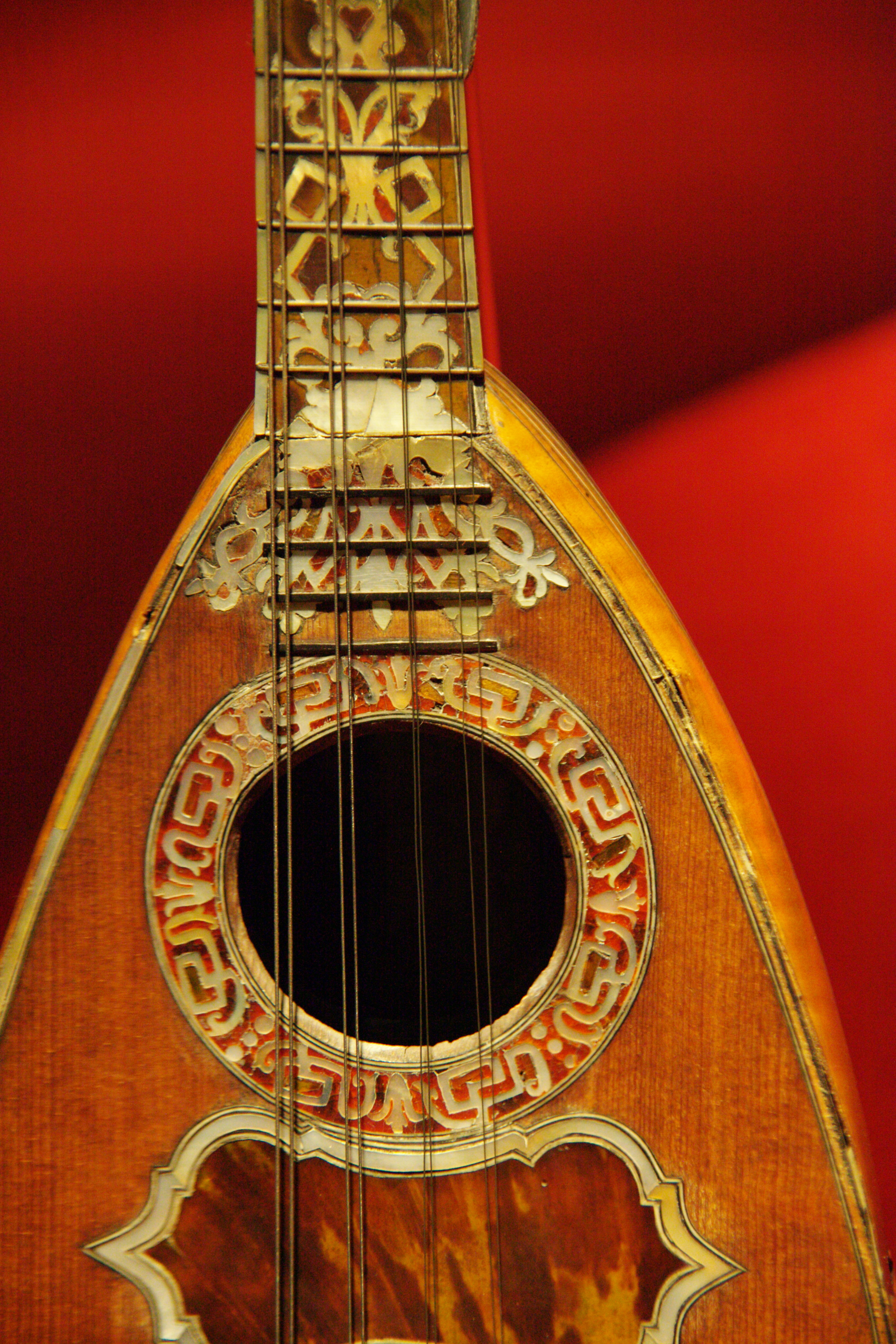
Vincenzo Vinaccia mandolin details

== Sources ==
- Sparks, Paul (2003). The Classical Mandolin. Oxford: Oxford University Press. ISBN 9780195173376.
- Tyler, James; Sparks, Paul (1989). The early mandolin. Clarendon Press. ISBN 9780193185166.
