= Bartolomeo Bortolazzi =

Italian composer

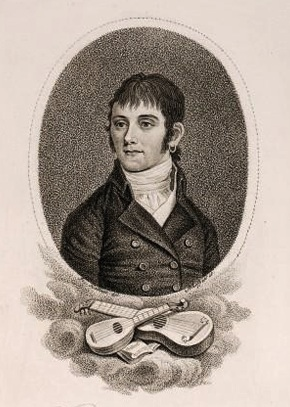
Bartolomeo Bortolazzi

Bartolomeo Bortolazzi (born Toscolano-Maderno 1772; died 1846) was a performing musician, composer, author, and virtuoso of both the guitar and the mandolin. He was credited by music historian Philip J. Bone as helping to pull the mandolin out of decline.

== Early life ==
Bortolazzi was born to musical parents, and when quite a child studied the mandolin. At a very early age, he made concert tours through northern Italy, meeting with considerable success. In the year 1800, he visited England where he was well received, remaining there two years and surprising the English audiences with his instrument.

== Career ==
At the beginning of the year 1801, Bortolazzi commenced the study of the guitar, and so great was his natural ability that the next year he was performing and teaching this instrument also, to the elite of London society. Whilst residing in London, he composed many works for voices and guitar, and piano and guitar, dedicating one of the latter compositions to his pupil, the Duchess of York this being published by Monzani & Hill, London. He left London in 1803, touring professionally through Germany and giving concerts in all the important cities with his usual success. He appeared the same year in Dresden, and in Leipzig, Brunswick and Berlin the year following, where critics and musicians were unanimous in their praise of his performances. After his last concert tour, he settled in Vienna in 1805, and devoted himself to teaching and composition.

== Contribution ==
The mandolin has risen and fallen in its popularity since its invention in the 1730s or 1740s. The instrument went into decline in the early 19th Century, and that decline was commented on by Salvador Leonardi, who was writing for the instrument when it was becoming popular again around 1880. According to Bone, Bortolazzi's playing inspired people to take up the instrument and for music to be written for it. "This artist, by his extraordinary talent, produced the most wonderful and unheard-of nuances of tone and charms of expression, at that time deemed scarcely possible on so small an instrument. Instead of the monotonous, nasal tone which had hitherto been produced he so manipulated the strings and plectrum that he opened an enlarged sphere of capabilities for the instrument. It is to Bortolazzi that we are indebted for the first revival of the mandolin as a popular instrument, a popularity which lasted for about thirty years and caused most of the great musicians of that time to compose for it."

Among his published works we find a method for the guitar entitled: New theoretical and practical guitar school, Op. 21, and a method for the mandolin entitled School for the mandolin, violin system. The guitar method was published in French and German by Haslinger, Vienna; it was a standard work in Austria during the first part of the nineteenth century, and met with such success that it passed through eight editions up to the year 1833. The first eleven chapters, of his method are devoted to the theoretical part, and the twelfth concerns the instrument. After these twelve introductory chapters, follow scales, cadenzas, and studies in all keys, arranged progressively, and thirty exercises on arpeggios, the work is concluded with a fantasia of three pages for guitar solo.

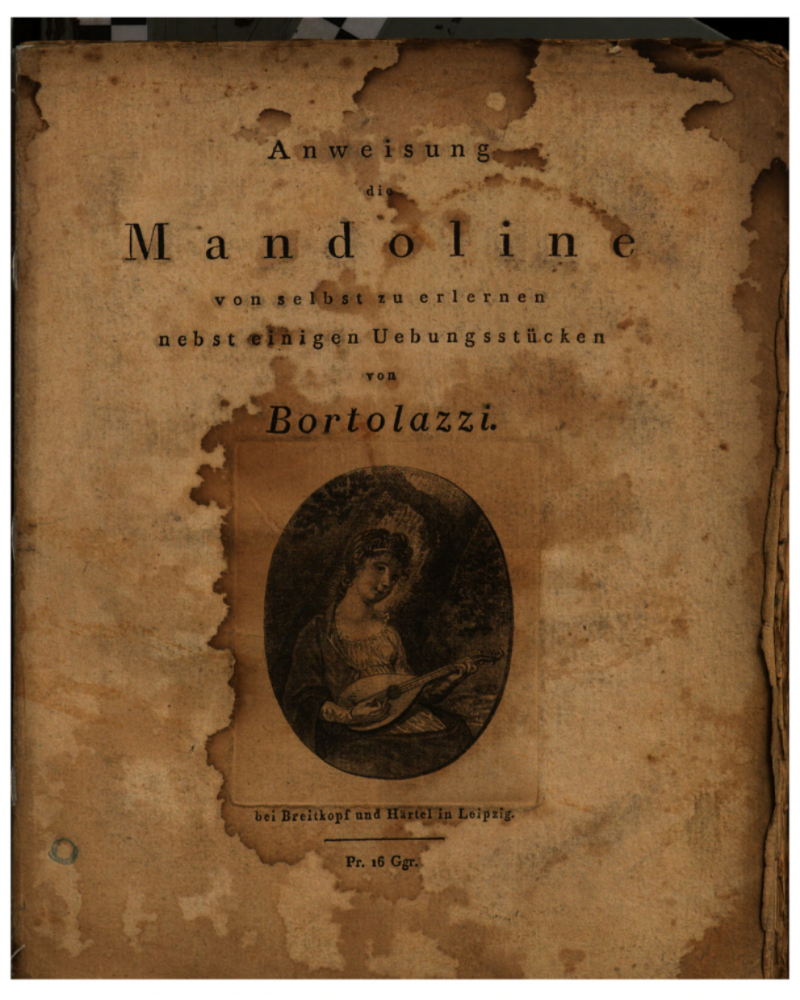
Mandolin method Anweisung de Mandoline by Bartholomeo Bortolazzi, published c.1805 in Leipzig by Breitkopf & Hartel.

The mandolin method, which was issued by Breitkopf & Hartel, of Leipzig, in 1805, also passed through many editions, including one revised by Engelbert Rontgen and published in German. The first lesson describes the mandolin and its various types (lute, Milanese, Cremona and Neapolitan mandolins, etc.)., and it is followed by various exercises for the management of the plectrum. It treats of arpeggios, harmonics, etc., and concludes with a theme and six variations for mandolin with guitar accompaniment. This method was seen as completely out-of-date by 1914.

== Songs ==
Bortolazzi was the composer of many simple, yet beautiful songs, which were very popular during his life, and among other of his published compositions we mention the following:

- Op. 5, Six Italian songs with guitar
- Op. 8, Variations for mandolin and guitar, published in 1804 by Breitkopf & Hartel, Leipzig, and also by Cappi, Vienna
- Op. 9, Sonata for mandolin and piano, same publishers
- Op. 10, Six themes with variations (in two volumes) for mandolin and guitar
- Op. 11, Six Italian songs with guitar, Simrock, Bonn;
- Op. 13, Six variations for guitar with violin obbligato
- Op. 19, Twelve variations concertante for guitar and piano, Haslinger, Vienna
- Op. 20, Six French romances with guitar
- Periodical Amusements for the Spanish Guitar volume 4.
- Twelve airs for guitar solo
- Rondo for guitar and piano in A, Concha, Berlin
- Sonata for guitar and piano, Peters, Leipzig
- Six variations for violin and guitar, Spehr, Brunswick
- Six dances and twelve books of guitar solos, Haslinger, Vienna
- Six Venetian songs with guitar, published in 1802 by Chappell, London
- Today, a trio for three voices with piano, dedicated to Count Waldestein, and printed for the author in 1801, London
- Cantate a Voccasion de la reception d'un frere, London, 1801
- Maurer lied, London 1802,

and numerous other similar works published in London and on the continent. He also left twelve variations for guitar remain in manuscript in Dresden and several others in Vienna.
