= Giovanni Battista Gervasio =

Italian musician and composer

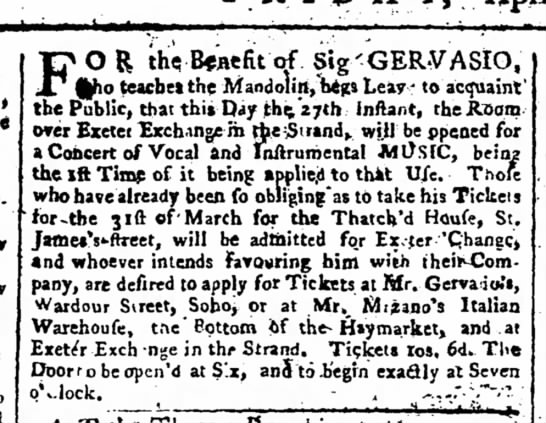
Gervasio placed an advertisement in The Public Advertiser, London on 27 April 1770 for a concert at Exeter Exchange.

Giovanni Battista Gervasio (c. 1725 - c. 1785) was an Italian musician and composer. Born in Naples he was one of the first generation of virtuoso-mandolinists who left Italy and played the mandolin in Europe in the 18th century. He was a composer for the mandolin and his works can be found scattered in 18th century collections such as the Gimo music collection and the Bibliothèque Nationale de France. He also wrote a mandolin method Methode facile pour apprendre a quatre cordes, instrument pour les dames (Easy method for learning four-string instruments for ladies), published in Paris in 1767. He performed in London 1768 and in Frankfurt-on-the-Main on December 10, 1777, and the Concert Spirituel in Paris on December 24, 1784 . He advertised in 1785 that he was master of singing and mandolin to Her Royal Highess, the Princess of Prussia. A work of music addressed to her exists today in the Bibliothèque Nationale de France.

Gervasio advertised his teaching services in Grenoble in 1785. As the last known advertisement for him, it has been proposed that he settled and later died there.

== Works ==
=== Gimo collection ===
Works in the Gimo collection were collected by a Swedish man, Jean Lefebure, "in the first half of 1762" in Italy. They were hand-copied commercial products.

- Mandolin Sonata in C major (Sonata Per Camera di Mandolino e Basso), mandolin and bass (Gimo 141)
- Mandolin Sonata in D major (Sonata Per Camera di Mandolino e Basso ), mandolin and bass (Gimo 142)(Gimo 143)
- Mandolin Sonata in D major (Sonata Per Camera di Mandolino e Basso), mandolin and bass (Gimo 144)
- Mandolin Sonata in G major (Sonata per Mandolino e Basso), mandolin and bass (Gimo 145)(Gimo 146)
- Duet in E-flat major for Two Mandolins (Duetto à Due Mandolini) (Gimo 147)
- Trio Sonata in D Major (Trio Sonata per Camera di Mandolino è Basso) (Gimo 149)
- Trio in D major (Trio a Due Mandolini e Basso), 2 mandolins and bass (Gimo 150)

=== Other collections ===
- Sonata for Mandolin, bass. No. 1. D major, (kept Bibliothèque Nationale de France) This is in two parts; possibly the same work that Konrad Wölki called Two sonatas four mandolin and bass and said was "held in Paris."
- Six duets for two mandolins
- Airs for the mandolin, guitar, violin or German flute interspersed with songs
- two sonatas for mandolin and bass

== Gallery ==
The Sonata for mandolin, bass. No. 1. D major by Giovai Battista Gervasio (from Naples), given to a Prussian princess. The work was labeled "for fun and chamber study" on the title page.

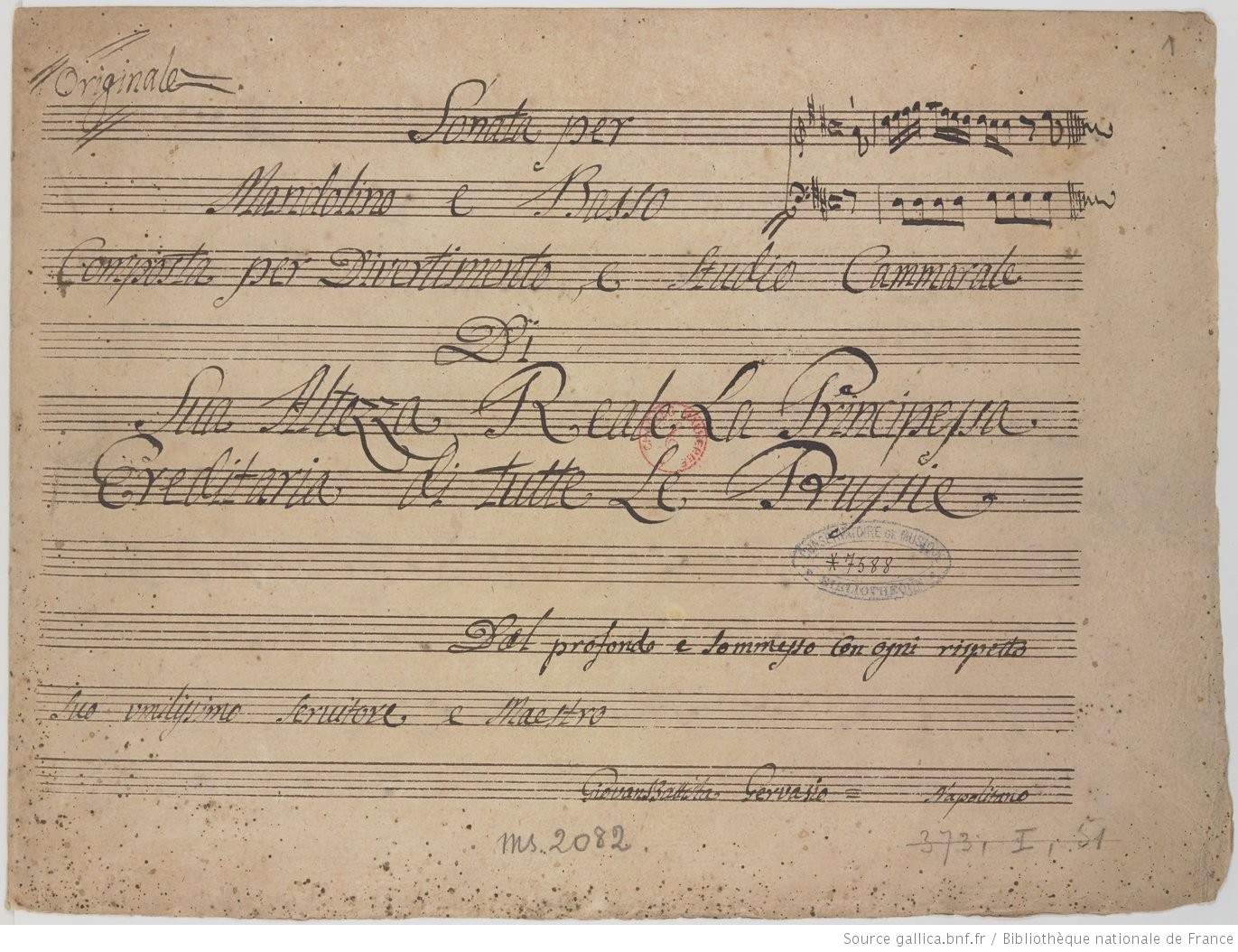

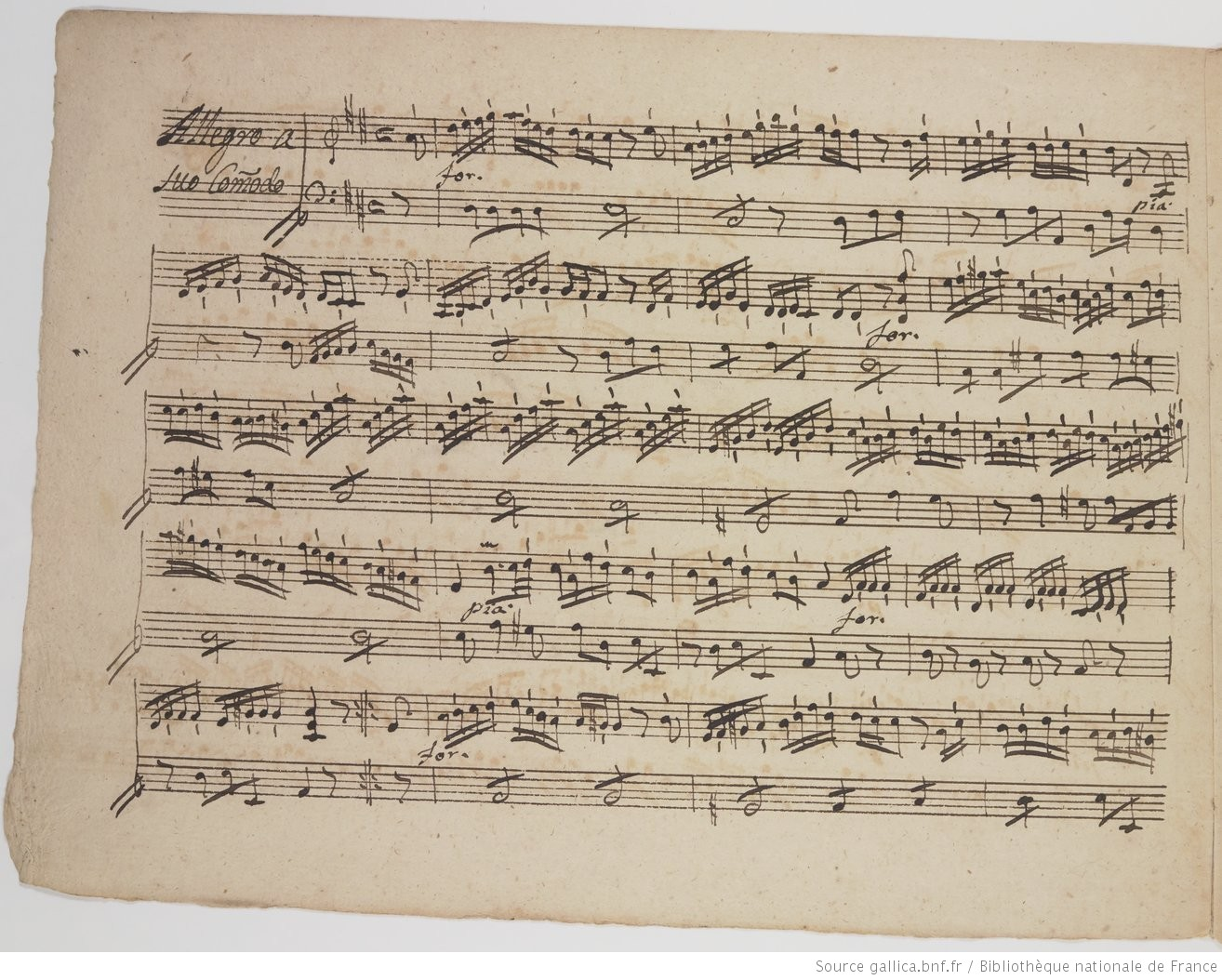

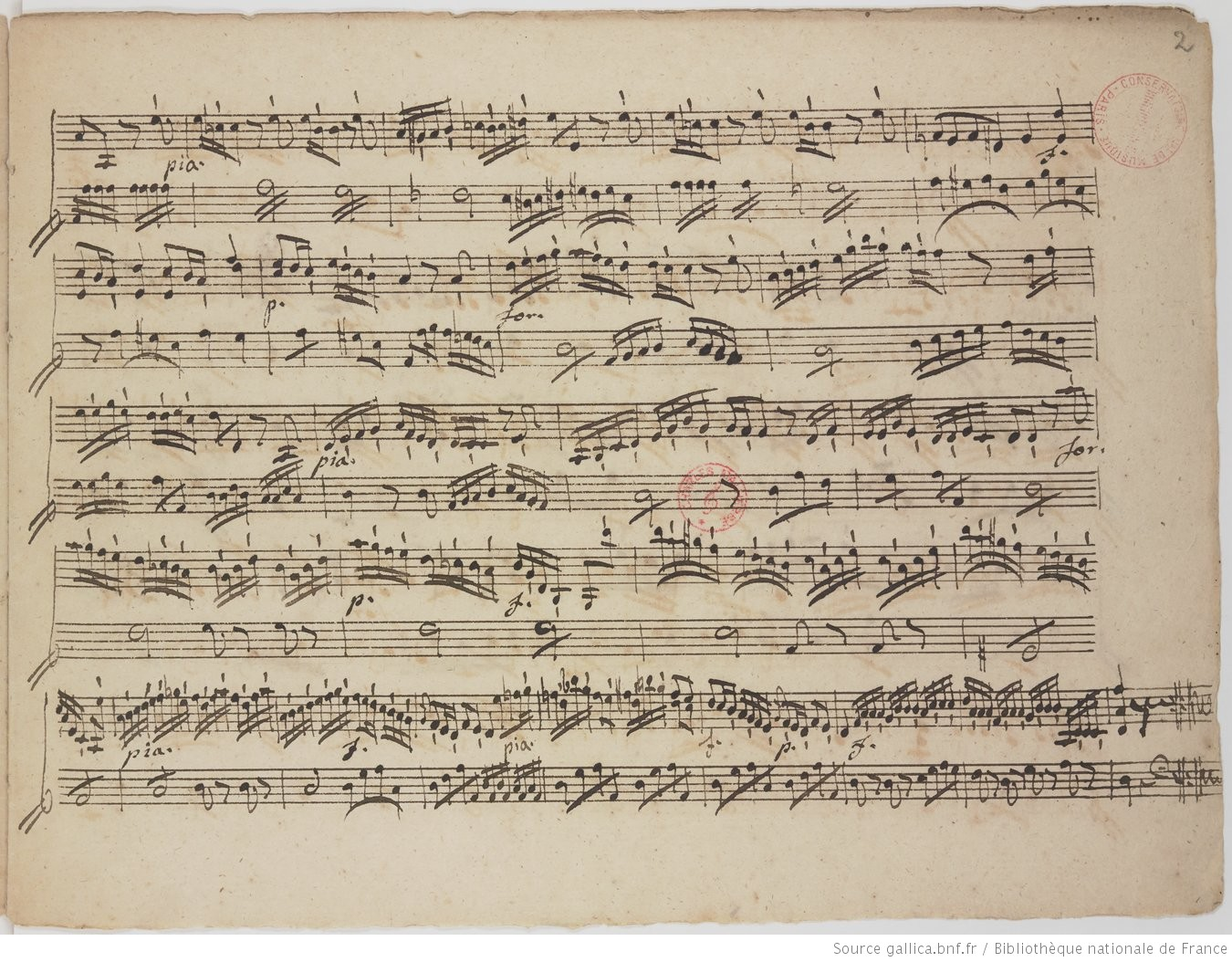

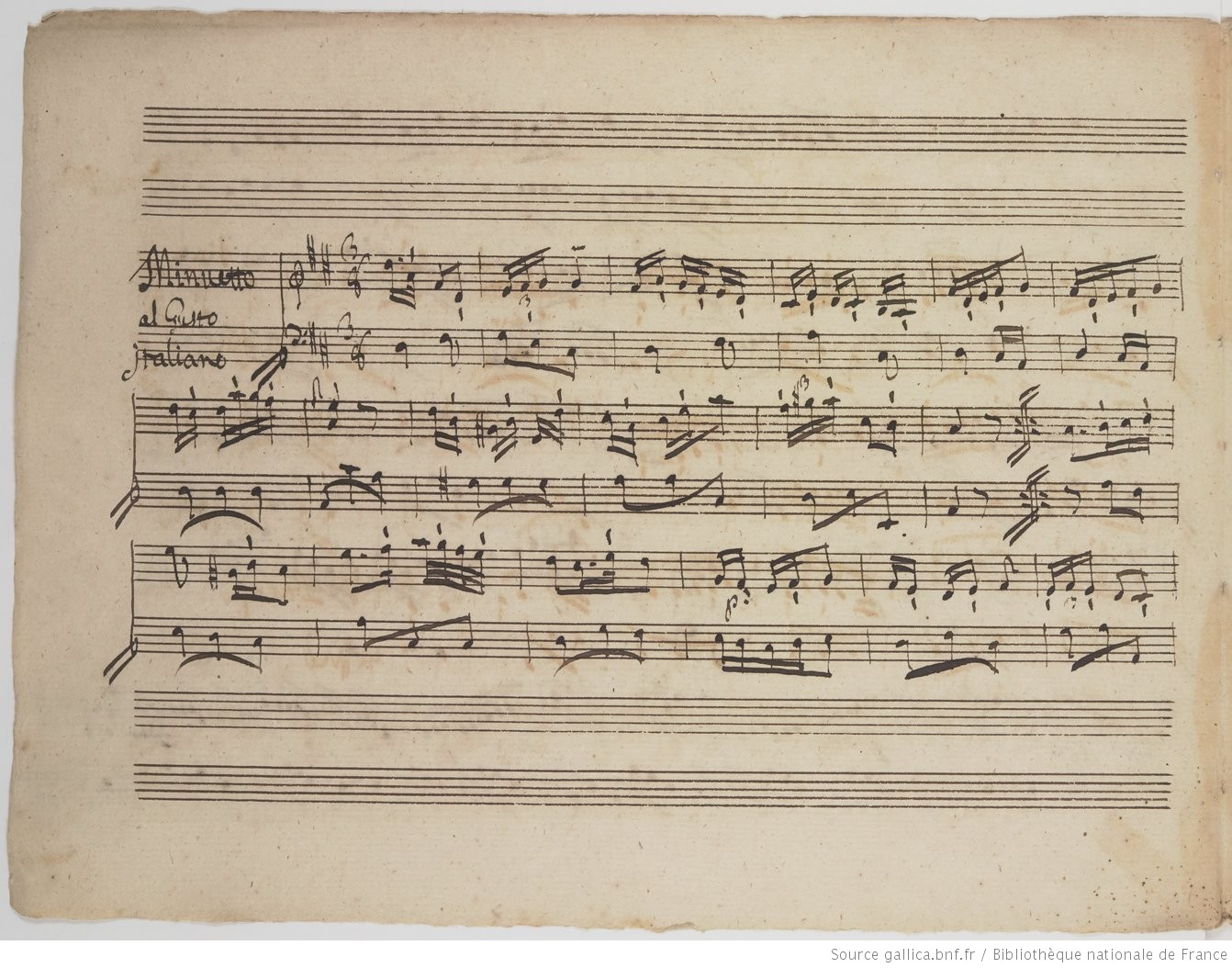

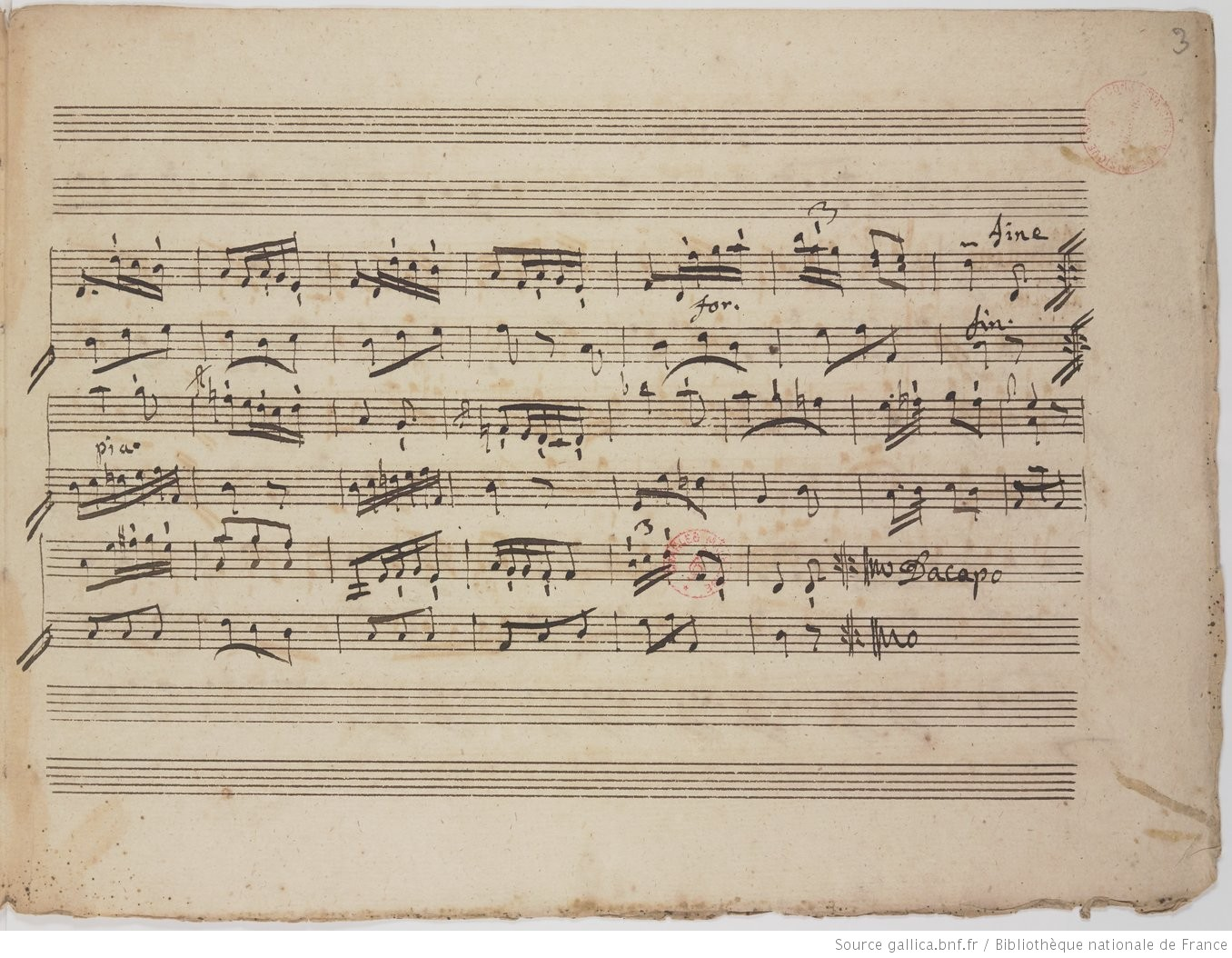

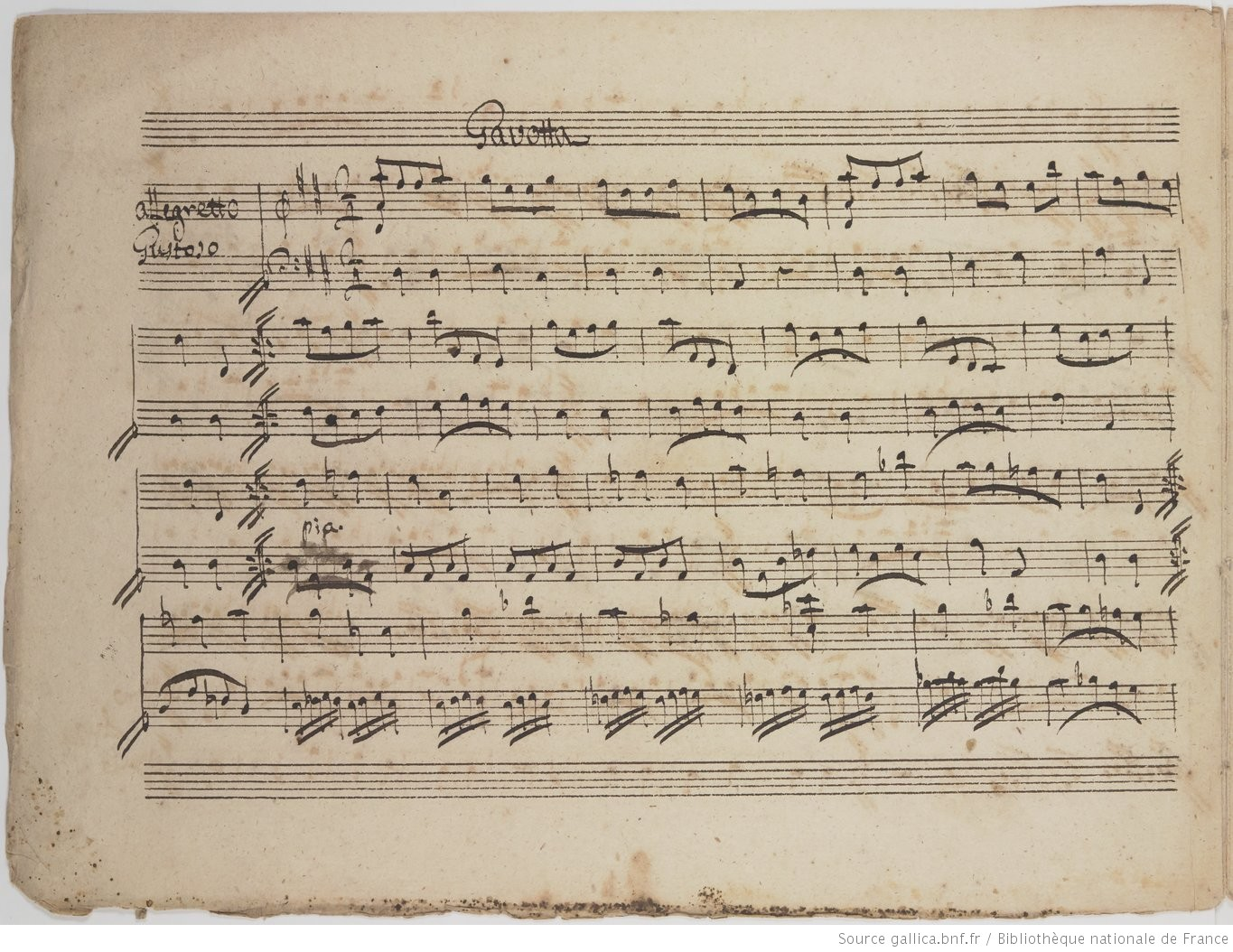

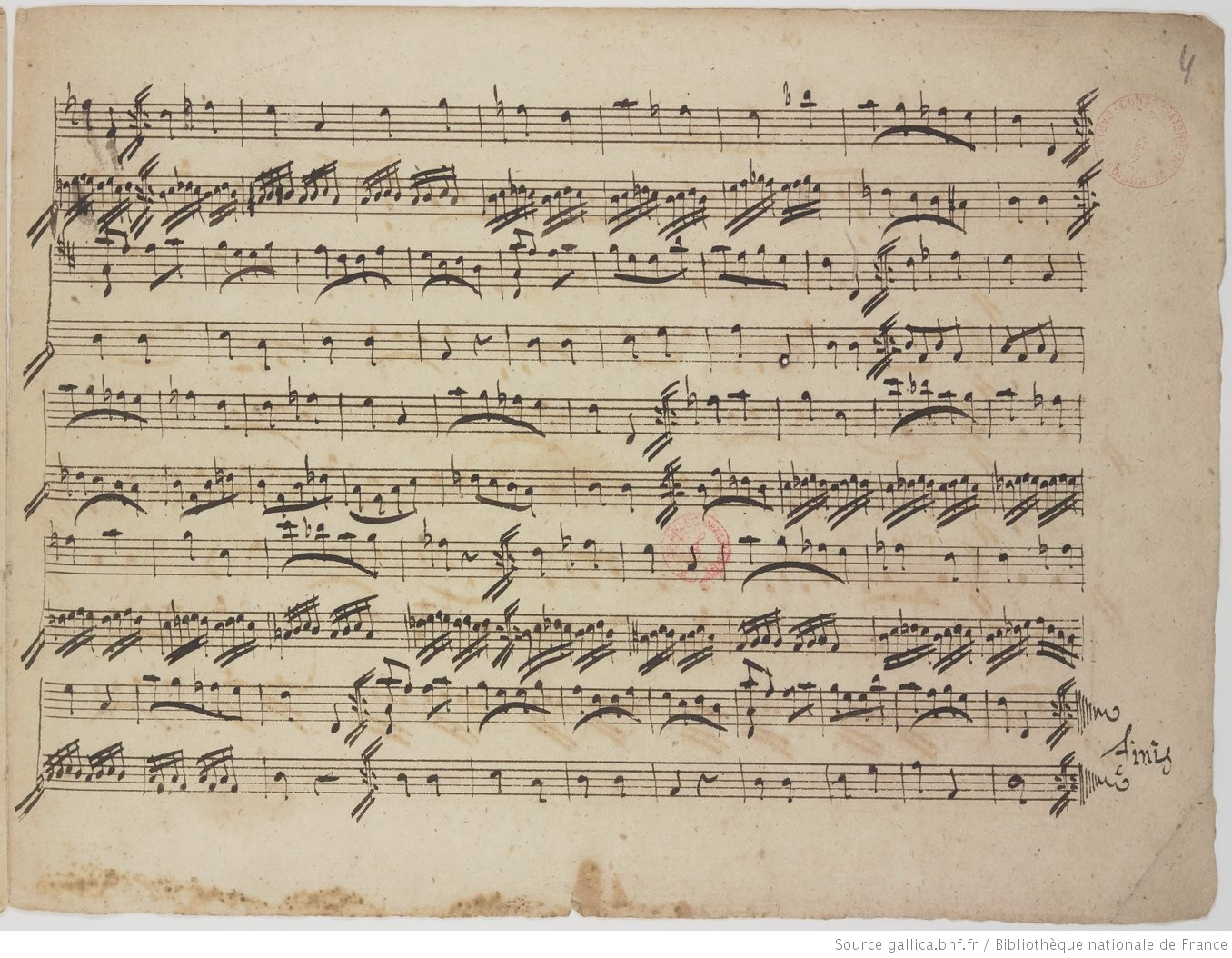

== Recordings ==
- 2011. Aonzo / Buttiero recordings. Il mandolino italiano nel settecento, Carlo Aonzo, Elena Buttiero
- 2016. Centaur Records. Gimo-Samling: 18th Century Sonatas & Trio Sonatas for Mandolin, played by Duo Acquavella.

== External ==
- Public domain sheet music for Gervasio
