= Mandolin playing traditions worldwide =

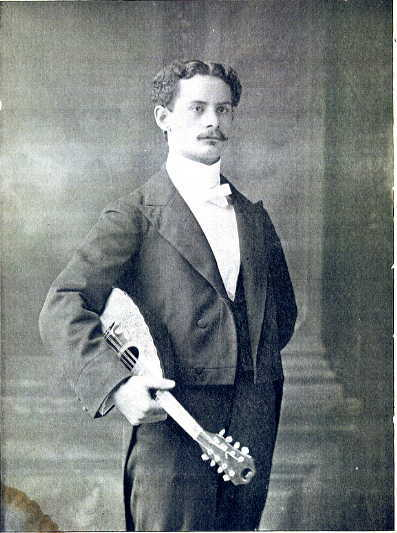
Italian mandolin virtuoso and child prodigy Giuseppe Pettine (here pictured in 1898) brought the Italian playing style to America where he settled in Providence, Rhode Island, as a mandolin teacher and composer. Pettine is credited with promoting a style where "one player plays both the rhythmic chords and the lyric melodic line at once, combining single strokes and tremolo."

Following its invention and development in Italy, the mandolin spread throughout the European continent. The instrument was primarily used in a classical tradition with mandolin orchestras, so called Estudiantinas or in Germany Zupforchestern, appearing in many cities. Following this continental popularity of the mandolin family, local traditions appeared outside Europe in the Americas and in Japan. Travelling mandolin virtuosi like Carlo Curti, Giuseppe Pettine, Raffaele Calace and Silvio Ranieri contributed to the mandolin becoming a "fad" instrument in the early 20th century. This "mandolin craze" was fading by the 1930s, but just as this practice was falling into disuse, the mandolin found a new niche in American country, old-time music, bluegrass and folk music. More recently, the Baroque and Classical mandolin repertory and styles have benefited from the raised awareness of and interest in Early music.

== Algeria ==
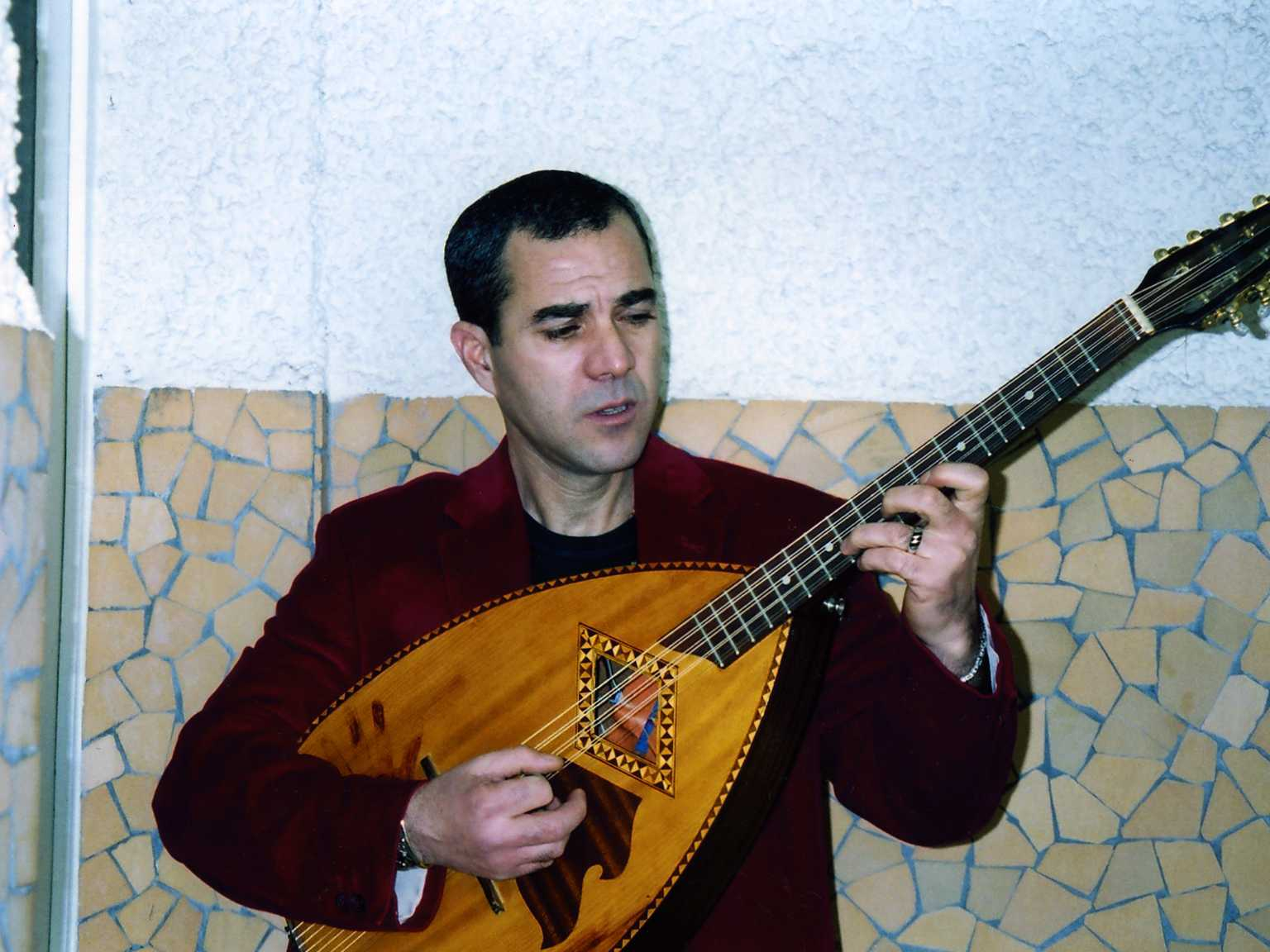
Karim Tizouiar with a mandole. His music helps to preserve and revive the Amazigh language and its heritage.

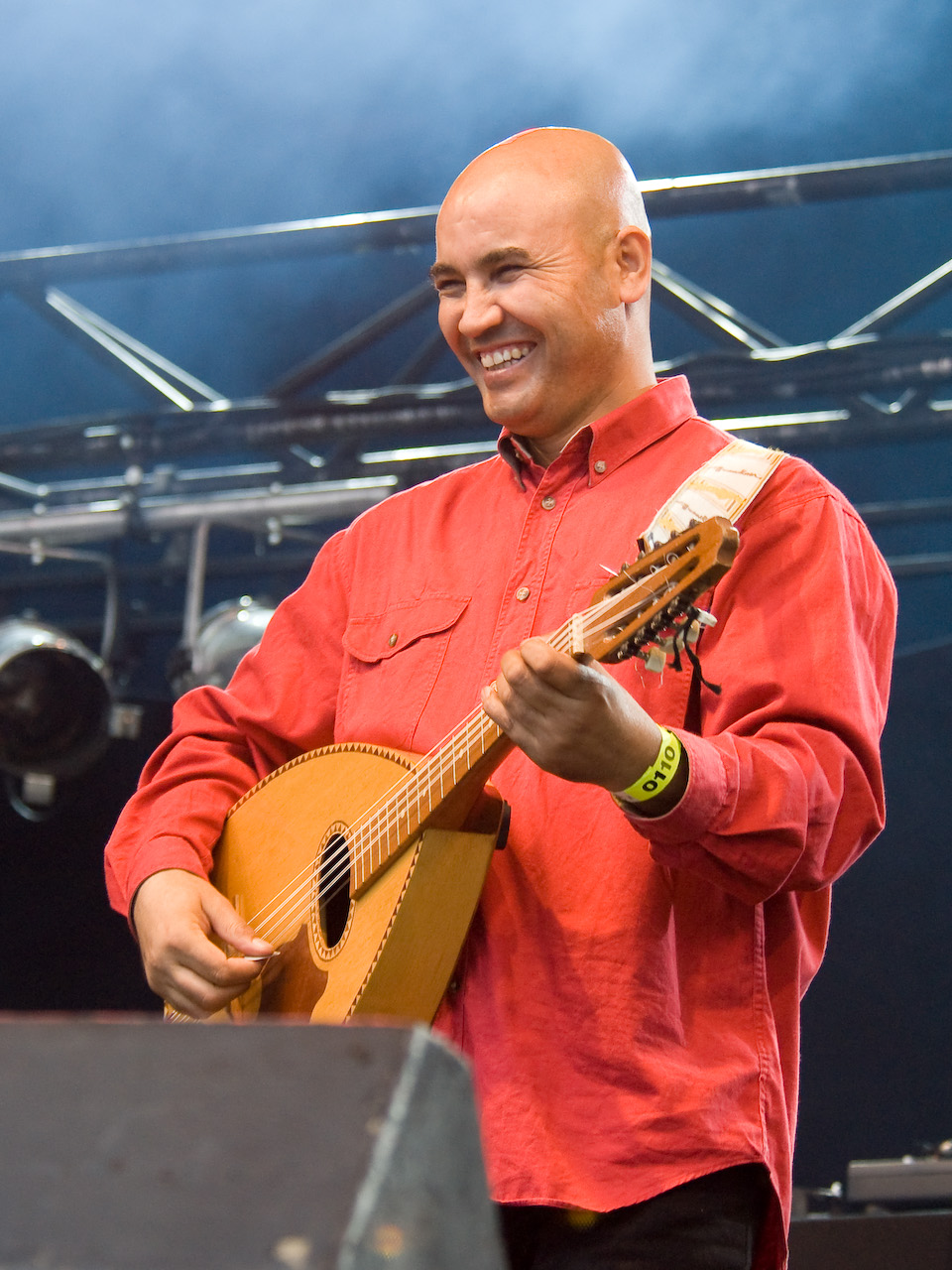
Abderrahmane Abdelli with Algerian mandole

Algeria was colonized by the French in the 19th century and there were large numbers of Europeans living there during the mandolin's golden age. Mandolins and larger members of the mandolin family were used in orchestras, including orchestras playing native Algerian music. With the decline of the mandolin worldwide, the mandolin became less common until by the 21st century it was rare. However, mandolins and mandolas are still occasionally made by luthiers. The major mandolin-family instrument in use today is the mandocello-sized mondol or "mandole" (French word for mandola applied to the new instrument). The flatback instrument was the result of a corroboration between an Italian luthier and an Algerian musician and was used initially for Chaabi. It has since spread to other music forms. Prominent players today include Mohamed Rouane, Takfarinas, Mohamed Abdennour (P'tit Moh), and Abderrahmane Abdelli. Past players include El Hadj M'Hamed El Anka, Boudjemaa El Ankis, El Hachemi Guerouabi, Amar Ezzahi, Cheikh El Hasnaoui, and Lounès Matoub. The mondol received some international attention on the movie El Gusto a featuring the reunion of some chaabi players (including a mondol player) years after the turmoil in Algeria came out in the 2010s.

== Australia ==
See Australian mandolinists

The earliest references to the mandolin in Australia come from Phil Skinner (1903–1991). In his article "Recollections" he mentions a Walter Stent, who was "active in the early part of the century and organised possibly the first Mandolin Orchestra in Sydney."

Phil Skinner played a key role in 20th-century development of the mandolin movement in Australia, and was awarded an MBE in 1979 for services to music and the community. He was born Harry Skinner in Sydney in 1903 and started learning music at age 10 when his uncle tutored him on the banjo. Skinner began teaching part-time at age 18, until the Great Depression forced him to begin teaching full-time and learn a broader range of instruments. Skinner founded the Sydney Mandolin Orchestra, the oldest surviving mandolin orchestra in Australia.

The Sydney Mandolins (artistic director: Adrian Hooper) have contributed greatly to the repertoire through commissioning over 200 works by Australian and International composers. Most of these works have been released on Compact Disks and can regularly be heard on radio stations on the ABC and MBS networks. One of their members, mandolin virtuoso Paul Hooper, has had a number of Concertos written for him by composers such as Eric Gross. He has performed and recorded these works with the Sydney Symphony Orchestra and the Tasmanian Symphony Orchestra. As well, Paul Hooper has had many solo works dedicated to him by Australian composers e.g., Caroline Szeto, Larry Sitsky and Michael Smetanin, as well as other works by Robert Allworth and Betty Beath.

In January 1979, the Federation of Australian Mandolin Ensembles (FAME) Inc. formed. Bruce Morey from Melbourne is the first FAME President. An Australian Mandolin Orchestra toured Germany in May 1980.

Australian popular groups such as My Friend The Chocolate Cake use the mandolin extensively. The McClymonts also use the mandolin, as do Mic Conway's National Junk Band and the Blue Tongue Lizards. Nevertheless, in folk and traditional styles, the mandolin remains more popular in Irish Music and other traditional repertoires.

== Austria ==
As the capital of an empire bordering Italy, musicians traveled to Vienna to work, compose and teach. Vienna was "the centre for the cultivation of mandolin playing" in the last part of the 18th century, and music written for mandolin has been preserved there. Composers and players who worked there or whose works have been preserved include Leonhard d'Call, Georg Druschetzky, Giovanni Giuliani, Giovanni Hoffmann, Leopold Kozeluch, Aichelbourgh, Giuseppe Blesber, Conrad Schlick (husband to Regina Strinasacchi), Leopold Neuhauser, Vincent Neuling.

== Belgium ==
In the early 20th century several mandolin orchestras (Estudiantinas) were active in Belgium. Today only a few groups remain: Royal Estudiantina la Napolitaine (founded in 1904) in Antwerp, Brasschaats mandoline orkest in Brasschaat, the Brugs mandolinegezelschap, the Mandolineclub De Krikskes (Berchem), the Cercle royal des mandolinistes Estudiantina in Mons (Bergen), the Königlichen Mandolinenorchester Eupen, the Ensemble de plectres de Nassogne and the Cercle royal des mandolinistes de Malmedy.

Gerda Abts is a well-known mandolin virtuoso in Belgium. She is also mandolin teacher and gives lessons in the music academies of Lier, Wijnegem and Brasschaat. She is now also professor mandolin at the music high school “Koninklijk Conservatorium Artesis Hogeschool Antwerpen”. She also gives various concerts each year in different ensembles. She is in close contact to the Brasschaat mandolin Orchestra. Her site is www.gevoeligesnaar.be

== Brazil ==
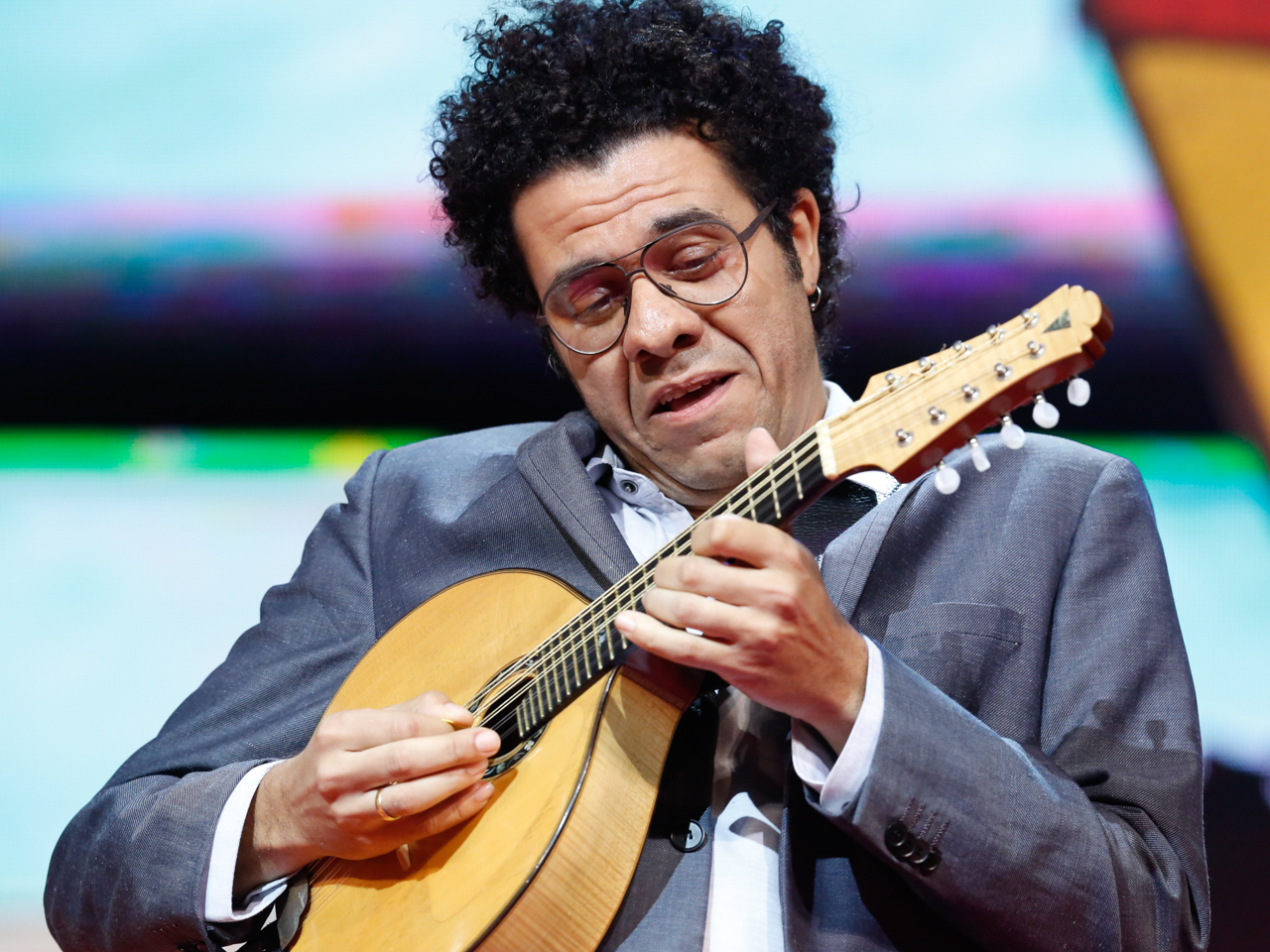
Brazilian Mandolin virtuoso Hamilton de Holanda playing a ten-string bandolim.

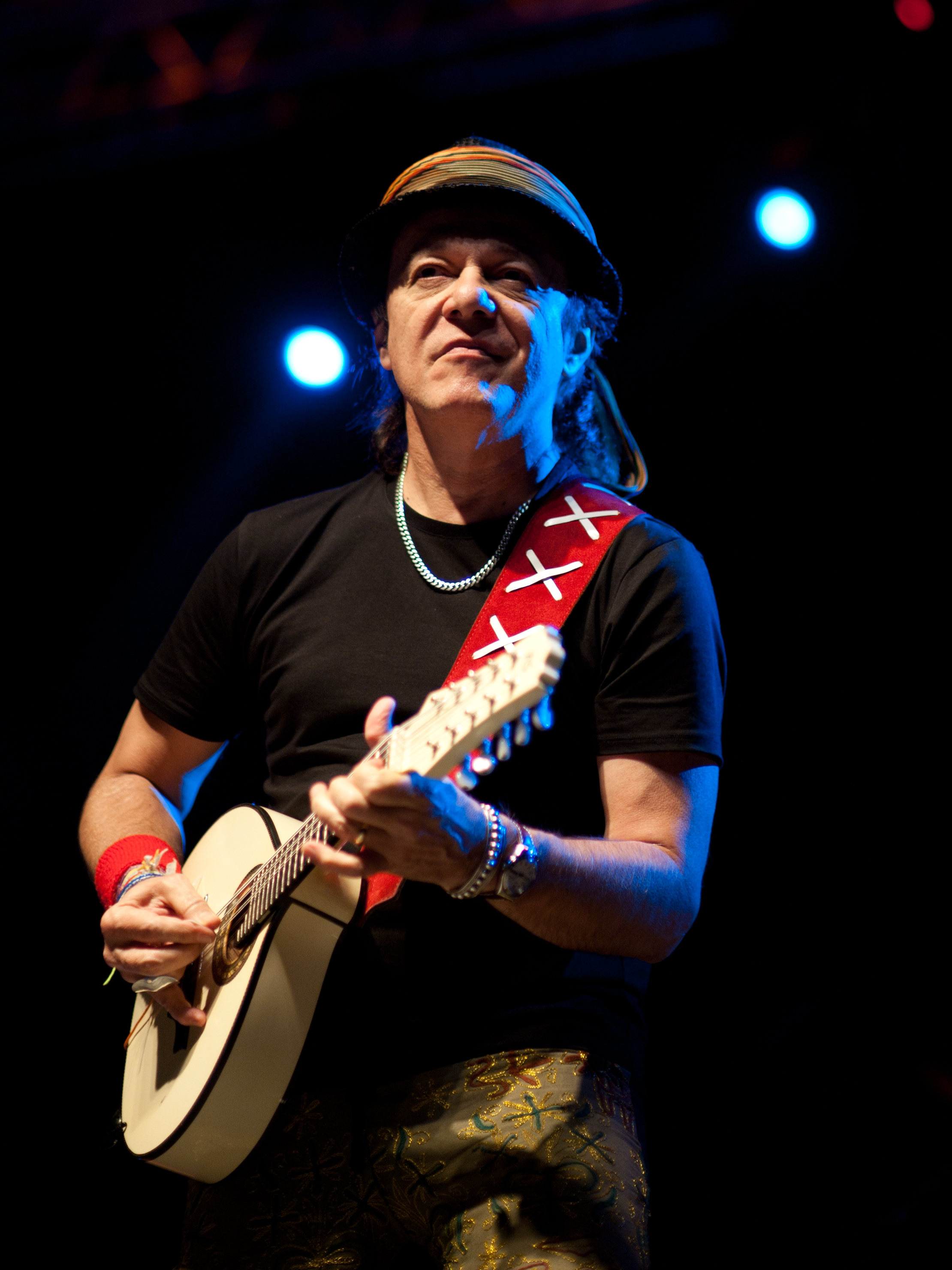
Brazilian guitarist Armandinho playing a bandolim.

See Brazilian mandolinists
See also the Portuguese guitar and Portuguese music.

The mandolin has a particular shape in Brazilian music and is known as the bandolim in the Portuguese language, which is spoken there. The Portuguese have a long tradition of mandolins and mandolin-like instruments and brought their music to their colonies.

In modern Brazilian music, the bandolim is almost exclusively a melody instrument, often accompanied by the chordal accompaniment of the cavaquinho, a steel-stringed instrument similar to a ukulele. The bandolim's popularity has risen and fallen with instrumental folk music styles, especially choro. The later part of the 20th century saw a renaissance of choro in Brazil, and with it, a revival of the country's mandolin tradition. Composer and mandolin virtuoso, Jacob do Bandolim, did much to popularize the instrument through many recordings, and his influence continues to the present day. Some contemporary mandolin players in Brazil include Jacob's disciple Déo Rian, and Hamilton de Holanda (the former, a traditional choro-style player, the latter an eclectic innovator.) Another is Joel Nascimento.

== China ==
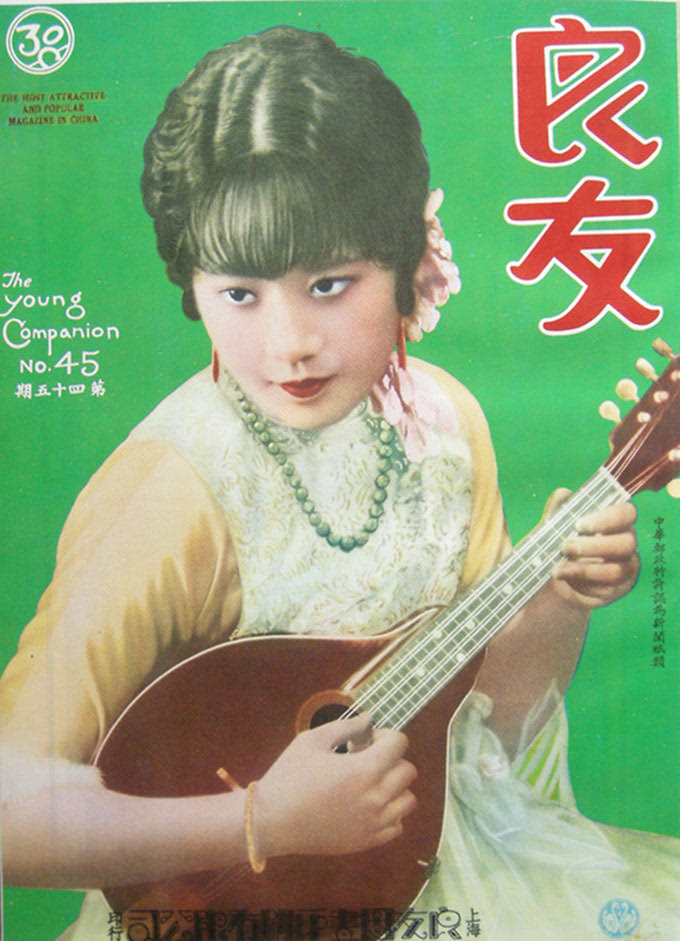
1930 cover of the Chinese magazine Liángyǒu (The Young Companion) with Chinese painter Guan Zilan playing a mandolin.

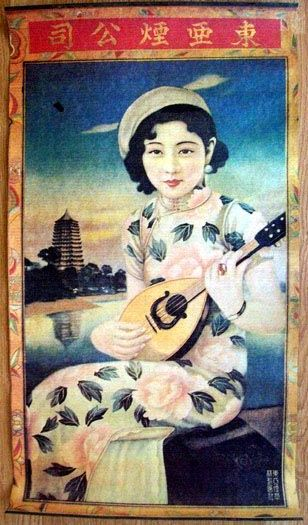
Advertising poster for the East Asian Cigarette Company c. 1930s, with a girl playing a mandolin.

Western instruments such as the guitar, mandolin and ukulele were "associated with youth and freedom", "sophistication and cosmopolitanism" in Shanghai and Hong Kong in the 1920s and 1930s. They appeared in the hands of movie stars and in magazines like Ling Long with "fashionable young ladies," where they became part of the modern girl image. Modern girls were college-age women, perceived as active and modern. Independent and westernized, they engaged in western recreational activities such as "driving motorcycles, swimming, horse riding, horse racing, rowing competitions," and playing musical instruments.

Artist Guan Zilan was one such modern girl, educated in Chinese and Japanese colleges. Her artwork was displayed in The Young Companion magazine, and she herself was on the cover with her mandolin.

Mandolins were also seen in Shanghai in an advertisement poster of the East Asia Cigarette Company, which showed a woman, well-dressed, holding a mandolin. A variation of this image was used elsewhere as a calendar illustration.

Although prominent in media in the hands of women, the instruments were not solely women's. Young men in western-run schools could choose them up as part of their education. Trying to be like his brother, Chou Wen-Chung was able to "dabble in" the mandolin at a school in Nanjing.

During the 1920s and 30s when the mandolin came to China, its popularity had peaked worldwide. Although the imported western instruments never became common in China, they were advertised for sale in Shanghai in 1920, in English-language publications, such as Our Navy, the Standard Publication of the U.S. Navy. When popularity for the fad began to fade after World War 1, China's neighbor Japan was an exception to that; mandolins were still popular and their use growing. Japan had commercial ties to coastal China, the very area from which the magazines and advertisements arose.

During the Chinese Cultural Revolution (1966–1976) it became dangerous in China to stick out from other people. The establishment feared "the taint of foreign ideas" and tried to root out the “representatives of the bourgeoisie who have sneaked into ... various spheres of culture.” Western classical music largely came to an end in China during the Cultural Revolution, when "listening to Beethoven became a political crime." At the Shanghai Conservatory of Music, western musical instruments were destroyed.

== Croatia ==
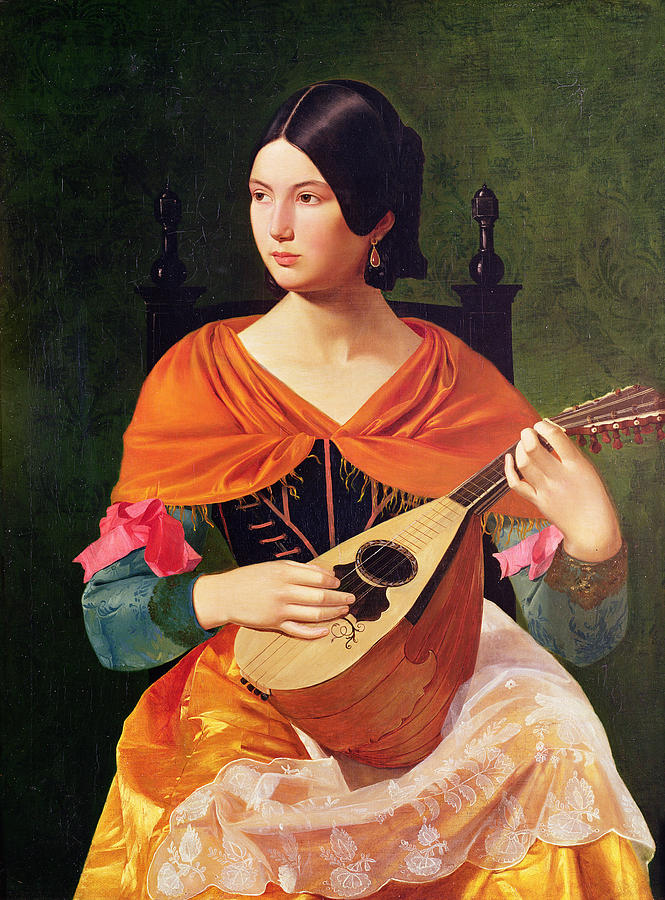
Painting by Croatian painter Vjekoslav Karas, c. 1845-1847. Rimljanka s lutnjom (Roman woman with a lute).

The mandolin is a staple of folk and traditional music on the Croatian coast. Croatian painter Vjekoslav Karas (1821–1858) painted an image of a girl playing a mandolin in about 1845.

== Czechia and Slovakia ==
See Czech mandolinists, Czech bluegrass

From Italy mandolin music extended in popularity throughout Europe in the early 20th century, with mandolin orchestras appearing throughout the continent.

In the 21st century an increased interest in bluegrass music, especially in Central European countries such as the Czech Republic and Slovak Republic, has inspired many new mandolin players and builders. These players often mix traditional folk elements with bluegrass. Radim Zenkl came from this tradition, emigrating to the United States, where he has played with U.S. stars, including David Grisman and Béla Fleck.

== Finland ==
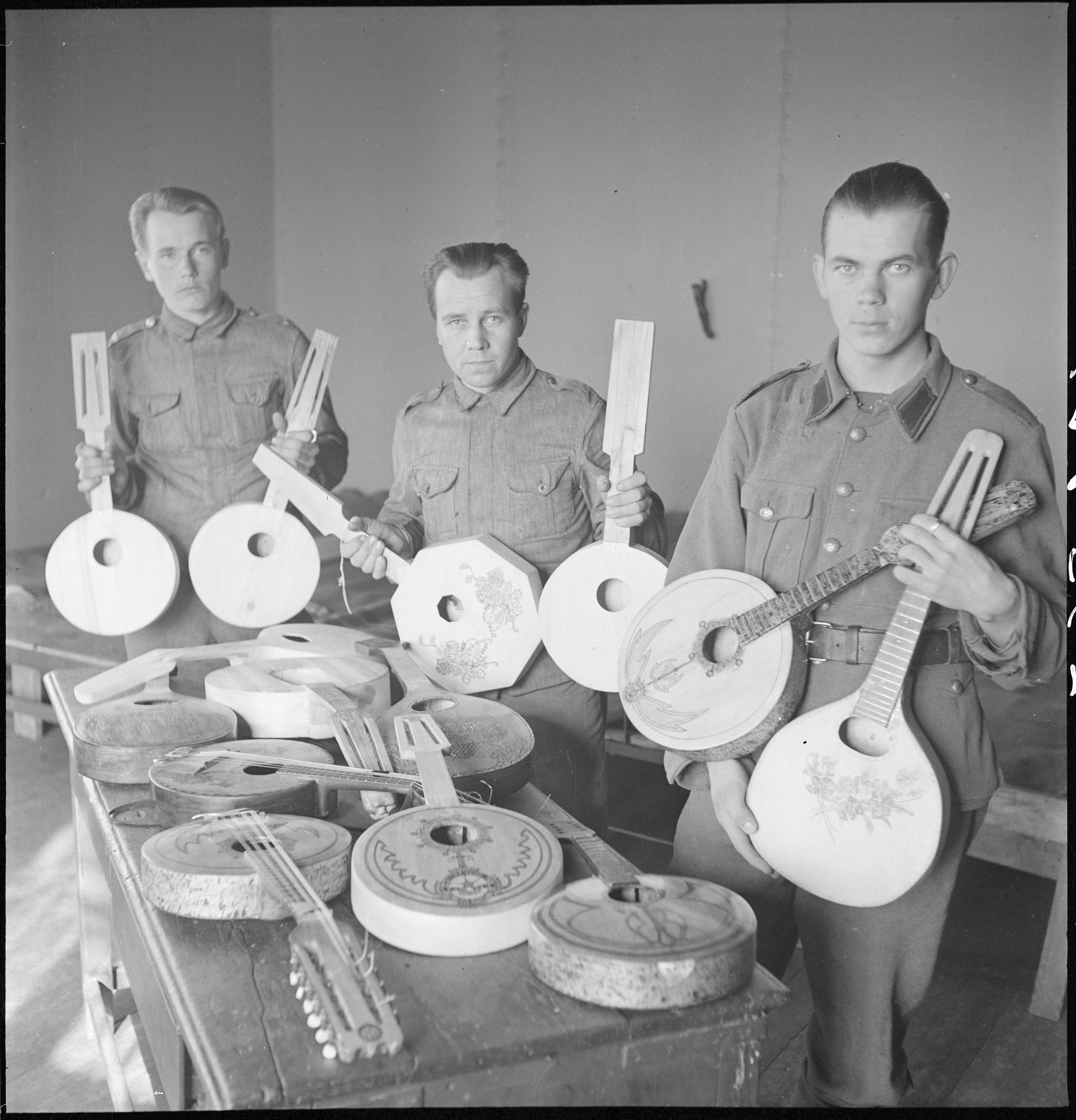
Finnish soldiers from 1943 with 12-string mandolins. One of the soldiers, Private Törrönen was credited as the luthier. Mandolin in bottom left is strung.

Finland has mandolin players rooted in the folk music scene. Prominent names include Petri Hakala, Seppo Sillanpää and Heikki Lahti, who have taught and recorded albums. Classical music is also represented with players such as Risto Aalto. A Finnish immigrant to the United States Arthur Kylander became a recording contract there in 1927, releasing 20 recordings with Victor Records, playing mandolin.

== France ==
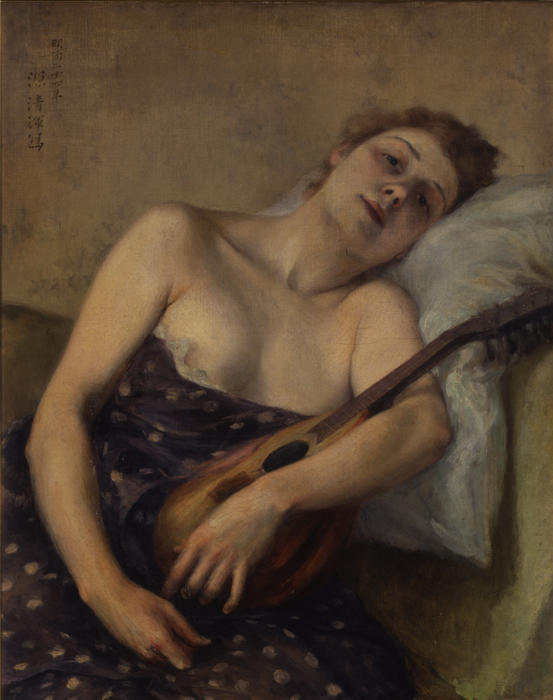
Painting by Kuroda Seiki, Woman holding a mandolin, 1891. He was a Japanese painter living in France.

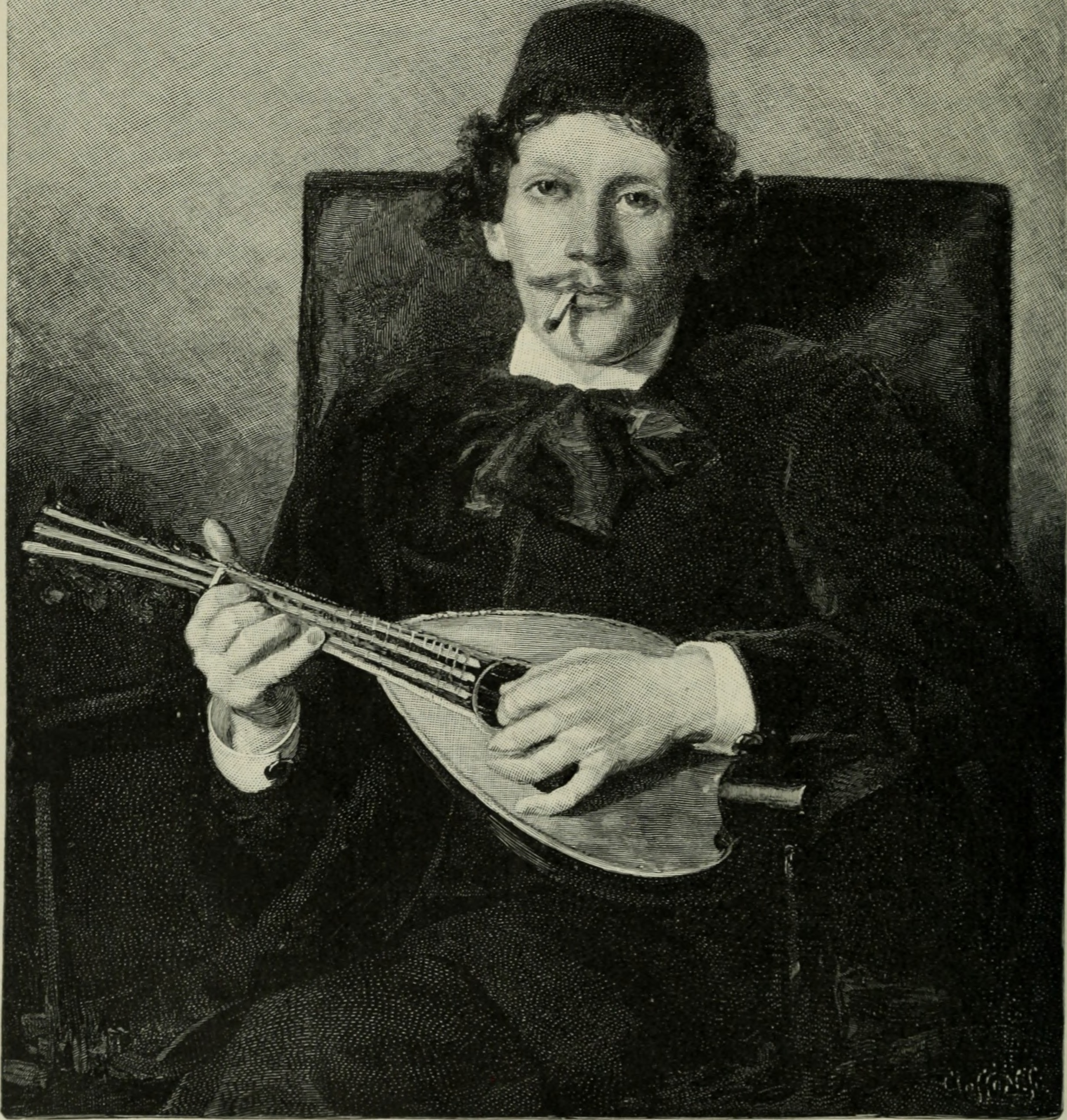
Painting by Charles Auguste Émile Durand, The Poet with the Mandolin, published in Scribner's Magazine, 1887.

In the 21st century, some have perceived a "rebirth" of the mandolin in France. Although an "Italian" instrument, France had a history with the mandolin family going back centuries, to the gitterns (12th-14th centuries), and the mandore arrived from Spain about 1570. One of the earliest surviving books of mandore music, the Music Tablature of François de Chancey was published in 1629 and featured music for the French court. It was dedicated to the Duke of Richelieu, Prime Minister of Louis XIII.

Prior to the Golden Age of Mandolins, France had a history with the mandolin, with mandolinists playing in Paris until the Napoleonic Wars. The players, teachers and composers included Giovanni Fouchetti, Eduardo Mezzacapo, Gabriele Leone, and Giovanni Battista Gervasio. From the mid-1750s until the Napoleonic War, virtuosos traveled Europe, performing, teaching and composing, many settling in France. Leone settled in Paris, Gervasio in Grenoble. Beginning with the French Revolution, the instrument declined from formal performance and "eclypsed" by 1820. It was rediscovered when the Spanish Students came to Paris for the Carnival of 1878. This was the beginning of the "Golden Age" of mandolins. During the Golden age itself (1880s-1920s), the mandolin had a strong presence in France. By the beginning of the 20th century, Paris had at least 30 mandolin orchestras. Prominent mandolin players or composers included Jules Cottin and his sister Madeleine Cottin, Jean Pietrapertosa, and Edgar Bara. Paris had dozens of "estudiantina" mandolin orchestras in the early 1900s. Mandolin magazines included L'Estudiantina, Le Plectre, École de la mandoline.

World War I marks the end of the golden age, as a "wave of American music at the Liberation buried the mandolin orchestras."

In the 21st century, interest in Baroque music has inspired a revival of concert mandolins for classical music, as musicians have begun rediscovering the "great repertoire." Partly this has been fed by the classical mandolin music tradition, preserved in Japan and Korea. French culture accepts music from around the globe, including former colonies — the Maghreb. Algeria, in particular, had a mandolin culture and created its own mandolin family instrument, the mandole. Other mandolin imports to France include Latin music from South America, American bluegrass mandolin, and the "plectrum instruments" of Slavic culture.

Today, French mandolinists include Patrick Vaillant, a prominent modern player, composer and recording artist for the mandolin, who also organizes courses for aspiring players.

== Germany ==
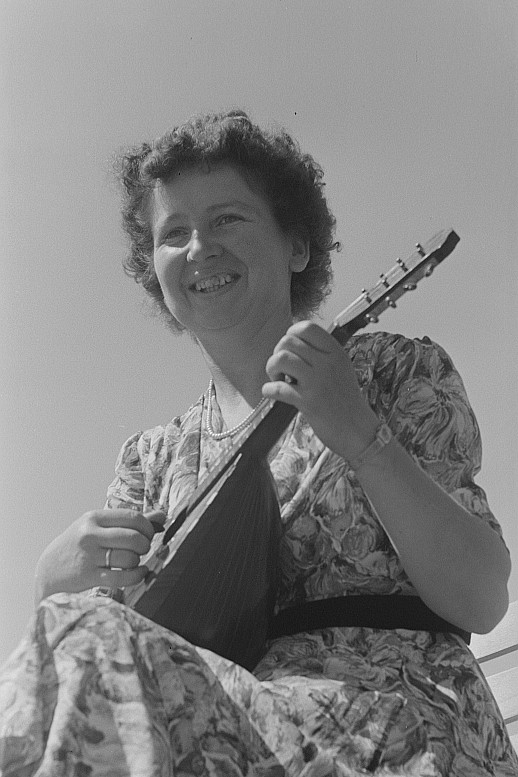
A woman playing a bowlback mandolin in Germany in 1952.

The mandore was known in Germany, prior to the invention of the Neapolitan mandolin. The mandolin spread to Germany with the visits of Italian mandolin virtuosi, including Achille Coronati. George Frideric Handel composed Alexander Balus in 1748. When the mandolin declined in much of Europe after the French Revolution, it found some energy in Bohemia, Germany and Vienna. Wolfgang Amadeus Mozart placed it in his 1787 work Don Giovanni, and Beethoven experimented with four compositions in 1795 and 1796. Johann Nepomuk Hummel created a mandolin concerto in 1799 and a mandolin and piano sonata.

The mandolin gained popularity as a folk instrument, especially with the groups of youth participating in the German youth movement, which began in 1897. In the early 20th century the mandolin was popular in the Wandervogel movement (groups of young men and women, hiking and camping, singing and playing instruments), due to the instrument's small size.

The mandolin became increasingly popular in contemporary music during the 20th century. An important German composer for mandolin and mandolin orchestra of the 20th century was Konrad Wölki; he was instrumental in bringing musicological recognition of the mandolin and the orchestra. Mandolin orchestras are still playing in Germany, in various chamber music ensembles and as a solo instrument. The instrument is popular enough today that there is an increasing number of professional mandolin players and composers writing new works for the mandolin.

At the college level, the mandolin has a presence, in the professorial chair for mandolins, chaired by Caterina Lichtenberg. She succeeded Marga Wilden-Hüsgen at the Hochschule für Musik und Tanz Köln, in Wuppertal. Another program with specialized training for students offering a diploma in this instrument takes place by Gertrud Weyhofen at the Music Academy Kassel and more recently at the University of Music Saar and by Steffen Trekel at Hamburg Conservatory.

The instrument was present in the folk revival of the 1970s. One mandolin player was Erich Schmeckenbecher in the duo Zupfgeigenhansel. Comedian Hans Süper played a modified mandolin, which he called his "Bovec," in the duo Colonia.

== Greece ==
The mandolin has a long tradition in the Ionian Islands (the Heptanese) and Crete, and later in the Urban centers of Southern Mainland Greece. It has long been played in the Aegean islands outside the control of the Ottoman Empire. It is common to see choirs accompanied by mandolin players (the mandolinátes) in the Ionian islands and especially in the cities of Corfu, Zakynthos, Lefkada and Kefalonia. The evolution of the repertoire for choir and mandolins (kantádes) occurred during Venetian rule over the islands.

On the island of Crete, along with the lyra and the laouto (lute), the mandolin is one of the main instruments used in Cretan Music. It appeared on Crete around the time of the Venetian rule of the island. Different variants of the mandolin, such as the "mantola," were used to accompany the lyra, the violin, and the laouto. Stelios Foustalierakis reported that the mandolin and the mpoulgari were used to accompany the lyra in the beginning of the 20th century in the city of Rethimno. There are also reports that the mandolin was mostly a woman's musical instrument. Nowadays it is played mainly as a solo instrument in personal and family events on the Ionian Islands and Crete.

Nikolaos Lavdas was a significant composer and mandolinist for Greece, who was the founder and director of the "Athenian Mandolinata", one of the oldest music associations and music schools in Greece.

== India ==
See Indian mandolinists

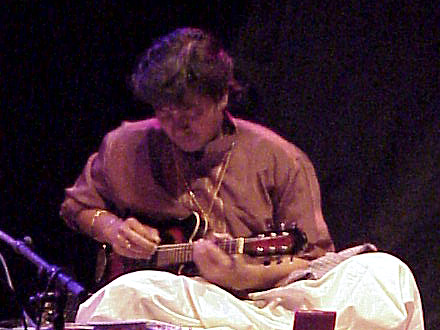
U. Srinivas

Mandolin music was used in Indian movies as far back as the 1940s by the Raj Kapoor Studios in movies such as Barsaat. The movie Dilwale Dulhania Le Jayenge (1995) used mandolin in several places. Bollywood music composer Ustad Sajjad Hussain (1917 – 1995) played the mandolin as a "Top Grade" player for the Indian film industry in Mumbai for more than five decades and was reputed to have played more than 22,000 songs, including title-songs and background music Besides the music for movies, he was known to play Indian classical music (Hindustani), as well as Arab and Sufi music.

Adoption of the mandolin in Carnatic music is recent and involves an electric instrument. U. Srinivas (1969–2014) has, over the last couple of decades, made his version of the mandolin very popular in India and abroad. He began his career with traditional 8-string (four-course) mandolin, but switched to a 5-string electric instrument tuned C-G-C-G-C, the two lowest strings tuned to the usual interval of a mandola (C-G-D-A) or five string mandolin with an added bass string.

Many adaptations of the instrument have been done to cater to the special needs of Indian Carnatic music. In Indian classical music and Indian light music, the mandolin, which bears little resemblance to the European mandolin, is usually tuned E–B–E–B. As there is no concept of absolute pitch in Indian classical music, any convenient tuning maintaining these relative pitch intervals between the strings can be used. Another prevalent tuning with these intervals is C–G–C–G, which corresponds to sa–pa–sa–pa in the Indian Carnatic classical music style. This tuning corresponds to the way violins are tuned for Carnatic classical music. This type of mandolin is also used in Bhangra, dance music popular in Punjabi culture.

Uppalapu Rajesh is another performer using the mandolin in Indian music, playing Indian classical music, jazz-fusion, and world music. He was nominated for a Grammy in 2009. He is brother to U. Srinivas.

== Ireland ==
See Irish mandolinists

The mandolin has become a more common instrument amongst Irish traditional musicians. Fiddle tunes are readily accessible to the mandolin player because of the equivalent tuning and range of the two instruments, and the practically identical (allowing for the lack of frets on the fiddle) left-hand fingerings.

Though almost any variety of acoustic mandolin might be adequate for Irish traditional music, virtually all Irish players prefer flat-backed instruments with oval sound holes to the Italian-style bowlback mandolins or the carved-top mandolins with f-holes favoured by bluegrass mandolinists. The former are often too soft-toned to hold their own in a session (as well as having a tendency to not stay in place on the player's lap), whilst the latter tend to sound harsh and overbearing to the traditional ear. The f-hole mandolin, however, does come into its own in a traditional session, where its brighter tone cuts through the sonic clutter of a pub. Greatly preferred for formal performance and recording are flat-topped "Irish-style" mandolins (reminiscent of the WWI-era Martin Army-Navy mandolin) and carved (arch) top mandolins with oval soundholes, such as the Gibson A-style of the 1920s.

Noteworthy Irish mandolinists include Andy Irvine (who, like Johnny Moynihan, almost always tunes the top E down to D, to achieve an open tuning of G–D–A–D), Paul Brady, Mick Moloney, Paul Kelly and Claudine Langille. John Sheahan and the late Barney McKenna, respectively fiddle player and tenor banjo player with the Dubliners, are also accomplished Irish mandolin players. The instruments used are either flat-backed, oval hole examples as described above (made by UK luthier Roger Bucknall of Fylde Guitars), or carved-top, oval hole instruments with an arched back (made by Stefan Sobell in Northumberland). The Irish guitarist Rory Gallagher often played the mandolin on stage, and he most famously used it in the song "Going To My Hometown."

== Israel ==
See Israeli mandolinists

The re-founding of Israel after World War II drew people from all across the world. Among them were people from Eastern European countries, where mandolin orchestras had been in use before the war. Researchers, such as Jeff Warschauer have gone to Israel, seeking to preserve klesmer music and Yiddish songs.

Mandolin orchestras were founded in the 1920s in the pioneering settlement in the Jezreel Valley and in the Jordan Valley by a teacher named Goldman. The orchestra in the Jordan Valley continues to operate today.

The oldest of the mandolin orchestras, which has been continuously active since the 1940s, is the Shfeya Orchestra, founded by Moshe Medalia, and today made up of graduates from the Shfeya Youth Village. The village is a boarding school for at-risk junior and senior high-school students. Part of the education includes students working together in small groups, teaching music to one another. There wasn't much in the way of learning materials when Moshe Jacobson, founder of the music program arrived in 1942. So he wrote text books for the instruments and composed music and songs.

Shimon Peres was an example of someone who brought his musical background. Peres, (born Szymon Perski), grew up in the then Polish town of Vishnyeva, was part of a mandolin orchestra when he was a child. The Vishnyeva orchestra of which he was part of was immortalized in a black-and-white photography, a group of young people dressed up holding their mandolins. Although busy with his political career, Peres remained musical for the rest of his life, composing songs in his home in Israel.

Israel today has four especially prominent mandolinists: Avi Avital, Alon Sariel, Jacob Reuven, and Tom Cohen. Another is composer Shaul Bustan, whose works include a Concerto for Mandolin and Accordion (2010) and an arrangement of Mozart's Symphony No 40 in G minor for mandolin, mandola, guitar and double bass (2014).

== Italy ==
19th-century visitors to Italy capture mandolin in art

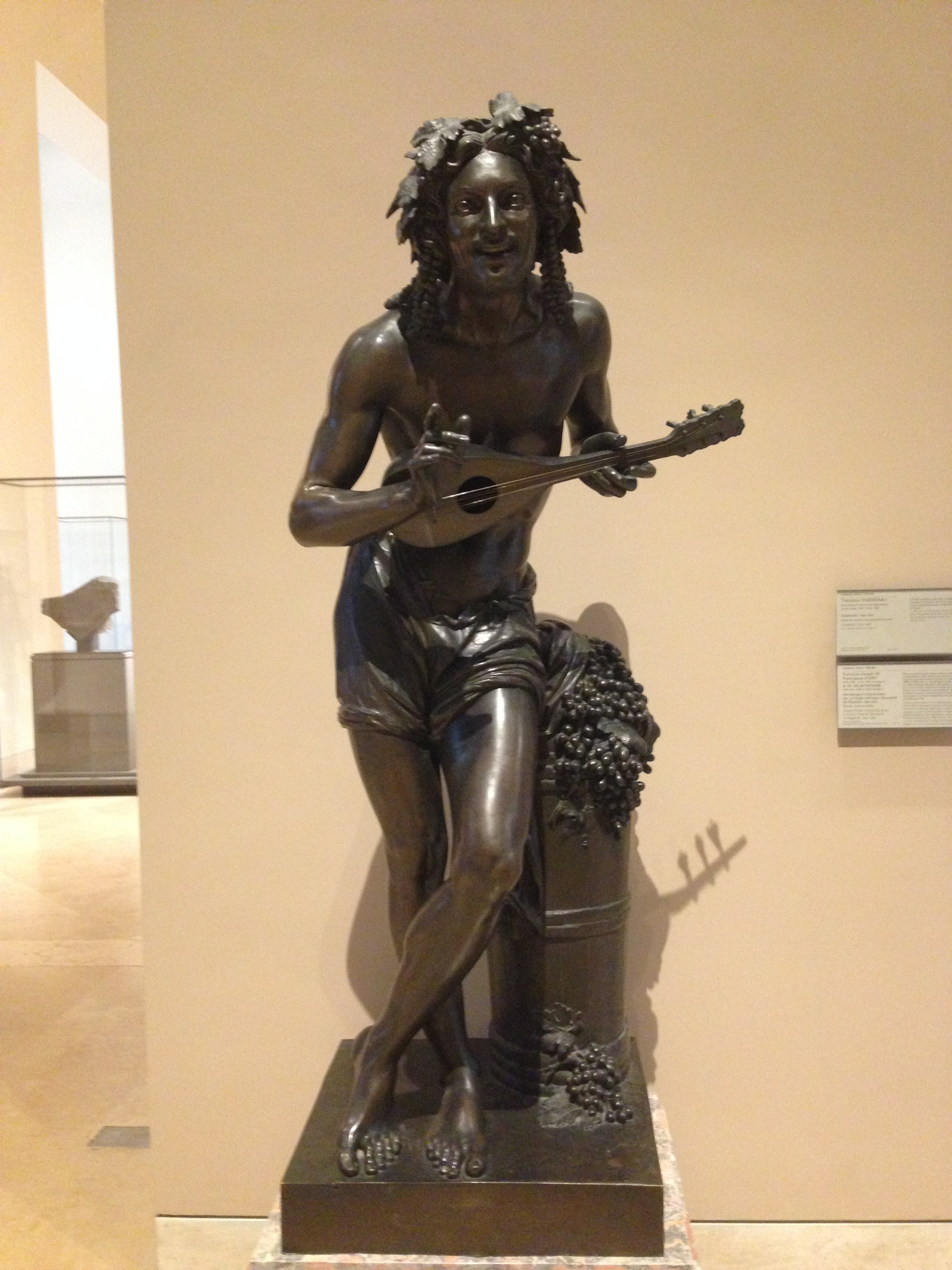
French sculptor Francisque Joseph Duret visited Naples and made Grape-picker Extemporizing by 1839. The mandolin was a folk instrument for most of the 19th century.

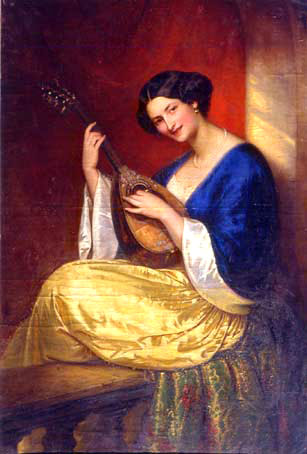
Estonia/Russia, The Mandolin Player by Julie Wilhelmine Hagen-Schwarz, 1851. She visited Italy for several years, when this was painted.

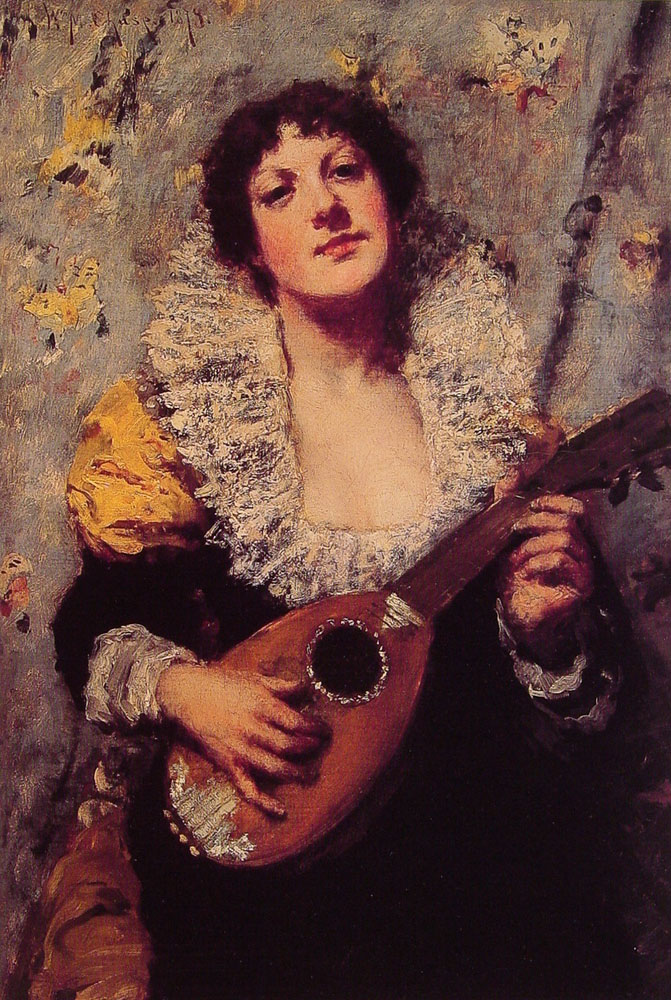
The Mandolin Player by William Merritt Chase (1879). He visited Italy 1877-1878. The mandolin in the painting was among his props in the USA.

See Italian mandolinists

Important performers in the Italian tradition include Raffaele Calace (luthier, virtuoso and composer of 180 works for many instruments including mandolin), Carlo Curti (who helped to popularize mandolin in the United States and Mexico), Pietro Denis (who also composed Sonata for mandolin & continuo No. 1 in D major and Sonata No. 3), Giovanni Fouchetti, Gabriele Leone, Carlo Munier (1859–1911), Giuseppe Branzoli (1835–1909), Giovanni Gioviale (1885–1949) and Silvio Ranieri (1882–1956).

Antonio Vivaldi composed a mandolin concerto (Concerto in C major op.3 no.6) and two concertos for two mandolins and orchestra.

Antonio Maria Bononcini composed La conquista delle Spagne di Scipione Africano il giovane in 1707. Others include Giovanni Battista Gervasio (Sonata in D major for Mandolin and Basso Continuo), Giuseppe Giuliano (Sonata in D major for Mandolin and Basso Continuo), Emanuele Barbella (Sonata in D major for Mandolin and Basso Continuo), Domenico Scarlatti (Sonata no.54 (K.89) in D minor for Mandolin and Basso Continuo), and Addiego Guerra (Sonata in G major for Mandolin and Basso Continuo).

More contemporary composers for the mandolin include Giuseppe Anedda (a virtuoso performer and teacher of the first chair of the Conservatory of Italian mandolin), Carlo Aonzo and Dorina Frati.

=== Cultural ghettoization and revival in Naples ===
In the late 20th century, information on the instrument, especially its history, became hard to find in Naples, where the instrument was born.

Historian Konrad Wölki commented on this in 1939, suggesting that after only a hundred years, there was a disturbing ignorance of the mandolin's history among Italian specialists. He felt that mandolinists must have fared better away from home and left "hardly any evidence of classical Italian mandolin music in Italy itself." His lists of places where the mandolin did better include Vienna, France and Germany.

The term cultural ghettoization has been used to describe the situation where no information is readily available about the mandolin's history, its luthiers, composers, musicians, and the relationship of the instrument to folk music and the "classic Neapolitan song". Tourists arriving in the city were more likely to find such information elsewhere. The city had moved on from mandolins and didn't place particular emphasis on remembering their history or place in Neapolitan culture.

Furthermore, throughout Italy there was a similar slide. By 1992 there was only one active chair remaining for mandolins at the country's conservatories, the Pollini Conservatory of Padua.

Since then there has been some progress made to revive the mandolin and knowledge of it.

Projects to address the lack of visibility of the mandolin and its history include the formation of a Neapolitan Mandolin Association in 1988, the restarting of the Neapolitan Mandolin Academy in 1992, and the creation of the Mandolin House.

The Neapolitan Mandolin Academy is a school in Naples offering a specialized course of study in the mandolin.

The Mandolin House is a restored house in via Duomo that has room for concerts, and which offers classes to international visitors, as well as serving as an information point for tourists. The crowdfunded project was in part begun by the efforts of Mauro Squillante as he tried to revive the mandolin tradition. He wanted a place in which to give concerts, do training and give exhibitions.

Another sign of progress is the growth of the mandolin within the college education system. While in 1992 there was only one active conservatory chair for mandolins, at Padua (instructor Dorina Frati), today there are also the Music conservatories of Naples, the Conservatorio di Milan (mandolin professor Ugo Orlandi), the Conservatorio di Musica "Niccolò Piccinni" in Bari (instructor Mauro Squillante), the Conservatorio di Musica "Nicola Sala" in Benevento (instructor Nunzio Reina), and conservatories in Palermo, and Salerno as well.

== Japan ==
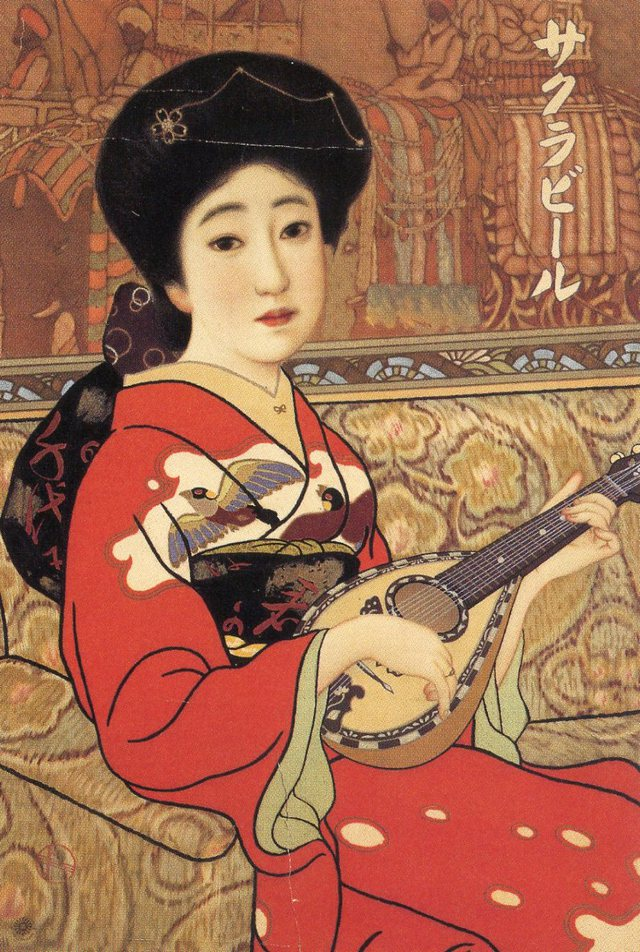
Japan, 1916, Sakura beer poster with girl playing mandolin. Art by Kitano Tsunetomi.

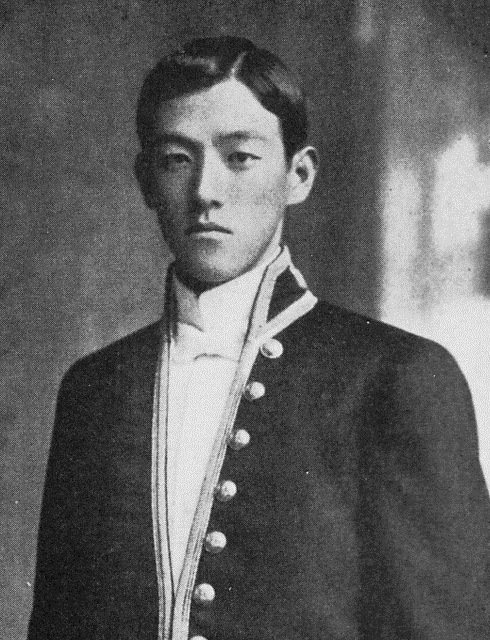
Morishige Takei in 1913.

Instruments of the mandolin family are popular in Japan, particularly Neapolitan (round-back) style instruments, and Roman-Embergher style mandolins are still being made there. Japan became seriously interested in mandolins at the beginning of the 20th century during a process of becoming westernized. In 1901, musical educator Kimihachi Hiruma (1867–1936) returned home to Japan after studying the mandolin. He opened a school and founded a mandolin ensemble in 1905.

Where interest in the mandolin declined in the United States and parts of Europe after World War I, in Japan there was a boom, with orchestras being formed all over the country.

Connections to the West, including cultural connections with World War II ally Italy, were forming. One musical connection that encouraged mandolin music growth was a visit by mandolin virtuoso Raffaele Calace, who toured extensively at the end of 1924, into 1925, and who gave a performance for the Japanese emperor. Another visiting mandolin virtuoso, Samuel Adelstein, toured from his home in the United States.

The expansion of mandolin use continued after World War II through the late 1960s, and Japan still maintains a strong classical music tradition using mandolins, with active orchestras and university music programs. New orchestras were founded and new orchestral compositions composed. Japanese mandolin orchestras today may consist of up to 40 or 50 members, and can include woodwind, percussion, and brass sections. Japan also maintains an extensive collection of 20th-century mandolin music from Europe and one of the most complete collections of mandolin magazines from mandolin's golden age, purchased by Morishige Takei.

In Nagoya the Mandolin Melodies Museum, founded by mandolin player Hirokazu Nanya, is dedicated to mandolins.

=== Influential people ===
Morishige Takei (1890–1949), a member of the court of Emperor Hirohito, established a mandolin orchestra in the Italian style before World War II. He was able to maintain his mandolin-guitar orchestra until 1943, in spite of the National Mobilization Law of 1938 that allowed the government to assert control of music, and ban western music and instruments, including the electric guitar, banjo and ukulele. He was also a major composer, with 114 compositions for mandolin.

Another composer, Jiro Nakano (1902–2000), arranged many of the Italian works for regular orchestras or winds composed before World War II as new repertoires for Japanese mandolin orchestras.

Original compositions for mandolin orchestras were composed increasingly after World War II. Seiichi Suzuki (1901–1980) composed music for early Kurosawa films. Others include Tadashi Hattori (1908–2008), and Hiroshi Ohguri (1918–1982). Ohguri was influenced by Béla Bartók and composed many symphonic works for Japanese mandolin orchestras. Yasuo Kuwahara (1946–2003) used German techniques. Many of his works were published in Germany.

== Jewish Eastern Europe and diaspora ==
In Jewish communities in Eastern Europe and North America, the mandolin was important in the years before World War II. The modern Ger Mandolin Orchestra website explained the importance, calling mandolins a "quintessential Jewish musical form... Mandolin clubs and orchestras were at one time ubiquitous in Jewish Eastern Europe and in North American immigrant communities." In the Holocaust Museum in Washington D.C, recorded memories recall the mandolin's place in Eastern Europe, in Poland, Latvia, Lithuania, Croatia and Macedonia. For some, the mandolin was progressive. Individuals, once from Eastern Europe, speak of playing music in different languages, of family members who were able to make the instruments needed for an entire orchestra, of playing or having family members play in mandolin orchestras, of parents who used to teach music.

The instrument was inexpensive and fairly easy for beginners to learn and became a first instrument for children. In the United States, it was embraced by left-wing "Socialists and Unionists" as the "Instrument of the people" and was part of the curriculum in Yiddish schools. There were Jewish mandolin orchestras and the instrument was popular with apartment dwellers as a quiet instrument that wouldn't disturb the neighbors. When Avner Yonai started researching the likely pieces that an Eastern European mandolin orchestra would have played, he found that little could be found about the repertoire his ancestor had played Poland; it was likely to have been light classical pieces, tango, and folk songs, possibly ethnic music from Jewish theater, Yiddish songs, Hasidic music and Klezmer.

Jewish mandolinists were prominent on the American mandolin. The earliest were performing during the Golden Era of the Mandolin, from the 1880s through the 1920s. They include Vaudeville musician Samuel Siegel of Des Moines (parents from Baden, Germany), Charles J. Levin of Baltimore, Samuel Adelstein of San Francisco, C.H. Pomeroy of Salt Lake City, and Valentine Abt of Pittsburgh. Another player who helped to keep the mandolin in the public eye after the Golden Era passed was Dave Apollon (1897–1972). Apollon grew up in Kyiv and performed in Vaudeville for 20 years, played with Russian, Latin, Gypsy and Ragtime material. His long lifetime playing let people hear virtuoso performances of the mandolin, and he contributed to the instrument's revival.

Modern players play a variety of music, as they explore their roots. Avner Yonai, a descendant of people from Gora Kalwaria, Poland, put together an orchestra in Berkeley, California in honor of the original Ger Mandolin Orchestra. Examples of the New Ger Mandolin Orchestra's repertoire include Russian Rag (a mandolin orchestra piece) and the Abe Schwartz Freylekh (Klezmer adapted for mandolins). Klezmer and mandolins came together in the 1970s in a "revival" in New York City, where "the overwhelmingly Jewish folk music scene would gather for Jam sessions – fiddles, banjos, and mandolins", with Klezmer and Bluegrass musician Andy Statman being credited for the success of the revival. Statman mixed jazz with klezmer.

Jeff Warschauer (a cantor since 2015) started the Klezmer Conservatory Band (1990–2003) and is part of The Strauss/Warschauer Duo (1995 to present) and has led Jewish mandolin orchestras Klez Camp and New York Arbeiter Ring. He has become a modern link to the older Jewish tradition, interviewing older Jewish musicians to collect songs in Yiddish and klesmer music. Coming from a background in Bluegrass, Swing, R&B and Folk music, he adapted his skills to use the mandolin in Klezmer, which doesn't use mandolin as a traditional instrument In one example on his album The Singing Waltz, Warschauer mixed mandolin with trombones for the song Dem Helfand's Tants (The Elephant's Dance), a combination that was also used for the Odessa Swing (composed by Steve Netsky). He mixed accordion, drums and piano with mandolin on the song Ot Azoy (That's the Way!).

Another bandleader is Eric Stein of Canada; his Beyond the Pale band plays Klezmer and Eastern European music.

Although information today is sparse, evidence of the musical culture remains, collected at The United States Holocaust Memorial Museum in Washington D.C., where there are pictures and recorded memories of Eastern European Jewish people, which recall the culture that existed in the first decades of the 20th century. Those that remained, emigrants to other countries took their music and memories with them, and gradually assimilated. Drawing on them for their memories has been part of the revival of the cultures that passed.

== Latvia ==
The Holocaust Museum has online artifacts dealing with musician Elfa Heifecs, a Jewish musician from Riga, Latvia, who organized mandolin orchestra there, about 1930.

== Macedonia ==
Macedonia has a mandolin tradition that dates back before World War II; The United States Holocaust Museum has a 1929 photo of a Jewish mandolin orchestra on display online. In modern times, the Skopje Mandolin orchestra was formed in 2001 and has performed in international competitions. Mandolinists associated with the Skopje Mandolin Orchestra include Ramadan Shukri, Suzana Turundzieva, Mustafa Imeri, Serafina Fantauzo, Gligor Popovski and Lazar Sandev.

== Mexico ==
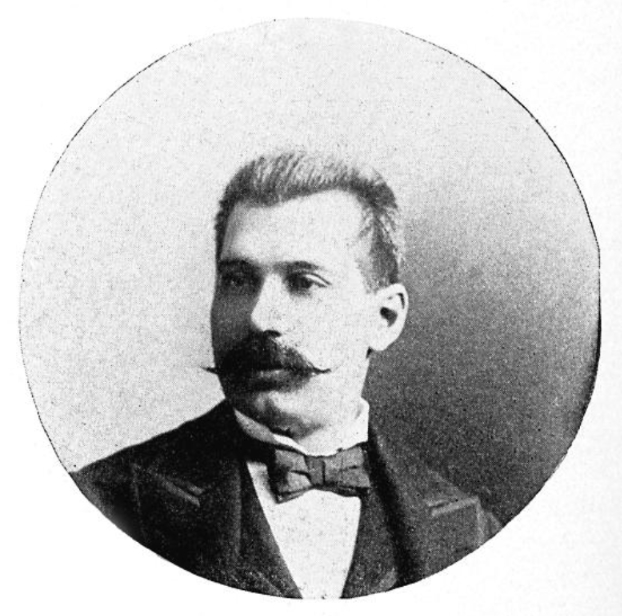
Italian musician Carlo Curti largely contributed to popularize mandolin in Mexico and United States since the late 19th century.

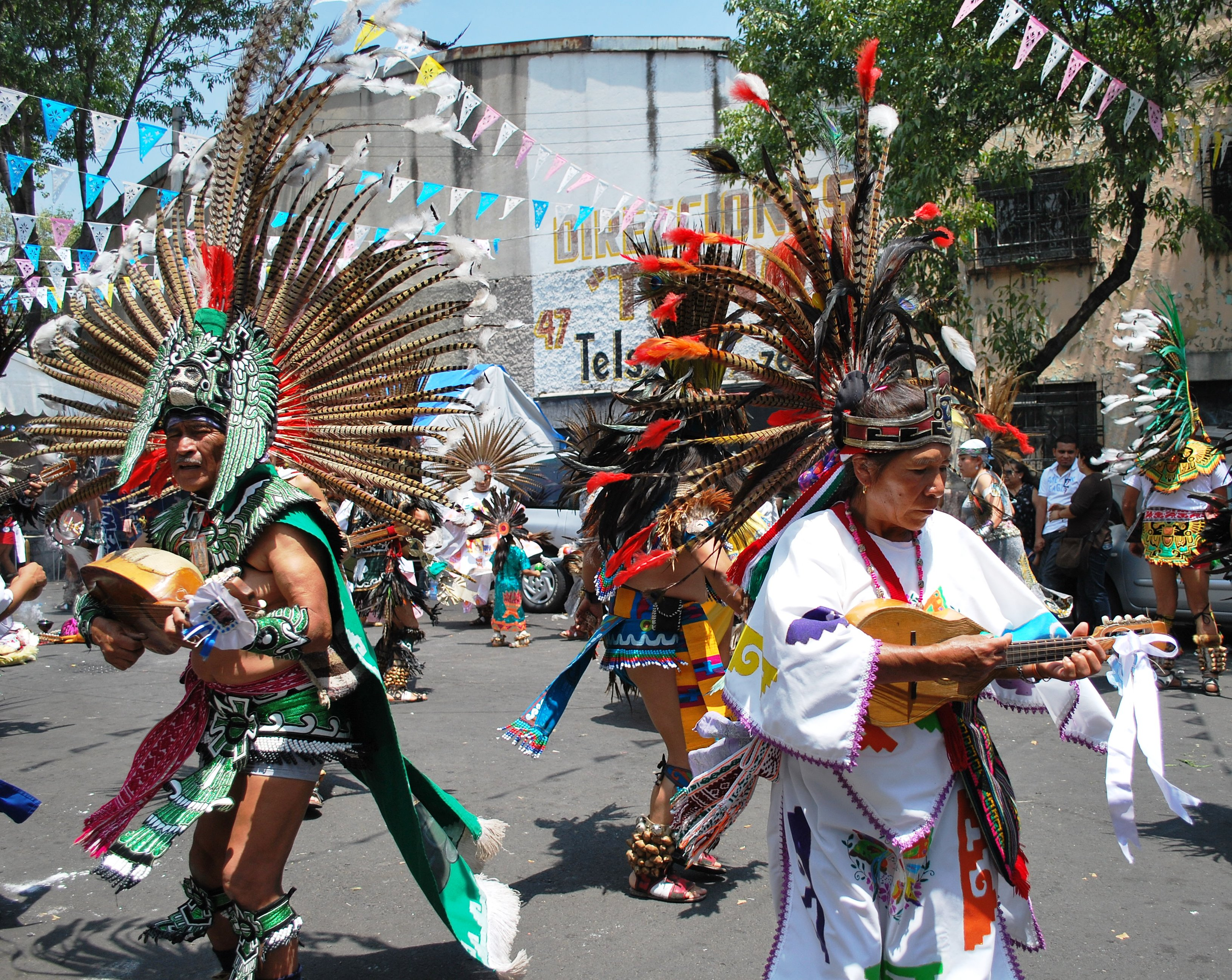
Concheros dancers with mandolin (right) and vihuela de conchera.

The mandolin has a mixed heritage in Mexico. Colonized by Spain, Mexico has both Spanish instruments as well as instruments created locally. These include the bandurria (like the mandolin, a descendant of the mandore/vandola), the bandolón and the conchera or concha. One group who regularly uses the mandolin are Native Americans, some of whom adopted the mandolin as a tribal instrument for the Concheros dances.

=== Native-American instrument ===
After the arrival of the Spanish invaders in 1519, the indigenous musicians and instrument makers of central and southern Mexico, took up European instruments. Tradition has it that the instruments were adopted by Native Americans in what is now modern Mexico in the 16th century. At least one person, not involved in the tradition, has speculated that the birth of the instrument might be closer to the mid-18th century.

The Spanish had prohibited the use of drums to Native Americans, in an effort to eliminate their dancing, which was tied to the drum rhythms. However the Spanish did not object to the Americans learning to play European instruments. The Americans took their drum rhythms and incorporated them into music on the lutes to "preserve the original beats of Danza rhythms." They used the Spanish instruments to "preserve their own songs, rhythms and sacred knowledge."

They copied the lute, and the mandolin (or its predecessors the vandola or gittern). The native instrument makers were so adept at creating beautiful sounding instruments, that soon the Spanish crown forbid the locals from making instruments, because this was taking business from the Spanish instrument makers of Europe and colonial Mexico. The natives were unable to make the wooden parts for the belly, for lack of the wood, small thin strips glued together into a bowl. They substituted a natural bowl, made of an armadillo shell. The instrument took its name (concha or conchera) from the shell, and the dancers (Concheros) from the instrument.

Three types of concheras exist, including the mandolin. Both roundbacks (armadillo shells) and regular flatback mandolin are played, using standard g-d-a-e tuning.

=== Carlo Curti ===
When Carlo Curti finished with playing mandolin with his "Spanish Students" in the United States, he organized a new act in Mexico in 1883–1884, the Mexican Typical Orchestra, which performed at the World's Industrial and Cotton Exposition (1885) in New Orleans and then toured the United States. The band included as many as seven bandolóns. Bandolóns were developed in Mexico, guitar sized instruments with 18 strings (in 6 courses of 3) related to the bandurria. When described in U.S. newspapers, it was noted that they looked like large mandolins. It was also noted that Carlo Curti was a well-known mandolin player, and some newspapers never found out what the bandolóns were, calling them mandolins.

The confusion may have added further to the impression in the United States that the mandolin and bandurria families were related. Musician Robert Braine wrote in the Etude in August 1918 that "the craze for the mandolin in the United States was a direct result of the concert tours, covering several years, of two of such orchestras, the 'Spanish Students' and the 'Mexican Typical Orchestra' from Mexico City." Braine was aware of the nature of the Neapolitan mandolin, but lumped mandolins and bandurrias together in his article, saying that the mandolin was "played, studied and taught" in Spain, Mexico and the South American countries.

== New Zealand ==
The Auckland Mandolinata mandolin orchestra was formed in 1969 by Doris Flameling (1932–2004). Soon after arriving from the Netherlands with her family, Doris started teaching guitar and mandolin in West Auckland. In 1969, she formed a small ensemble for her pupils. This ensemble eventually developed into a full-size mandolin orchestra, which survives today. Doris was the musical director and conductor of this orchestra for many years. The orchestra is currently led by Bryan Holden (conductor).

The early history of the mandolin in New Zealand is currently being researched by members of the Auckland Mandolinata.

== Peru ==
The mandolin is a recurrent instrument in the Andean music of Peru and in particular the huayno genre.

== Poland ==
The mandolin was used as a folk instrument throughout eastern part of European continent, including Poland, Ukraine and Slovakia in the early part of the 20th century. Mandolin orchestras were present as well. One example was the Mandolin Orchestra of Ger (Gora Kalwaria, Poland). A photo exists of the orchestra, made up of Jewish residents who were in the orchestra in the 1930s before the Jewish population was sent to the Treblinka extermination camp. A similar photo exists of a mandolin orchestra in the community of Grodno.

== Portugal ==
The bandolim (Portuguese for "mandolin") was a favourite instrument within the Portuguese bourgeoisie of the 19th century, but its rapid spread took it to other places, joining other instruments. Today you can see mandolins as part of the traditional and folk culture of Portuguese singing groups and the majority of the mandolin scene in Portugal is in Madeira Island. Madeira has over 17 active mandolin Orchestras and Tunas. The mandolin virtuoso Fabio Machado is one of Portugal's most accomplished mandolin players. The Portuguese influence brought the mandolin to Brazil and Sri Lanka.

== Romania ==
See Romanian mandolinists

== Russia ==
See Russian mandolinists

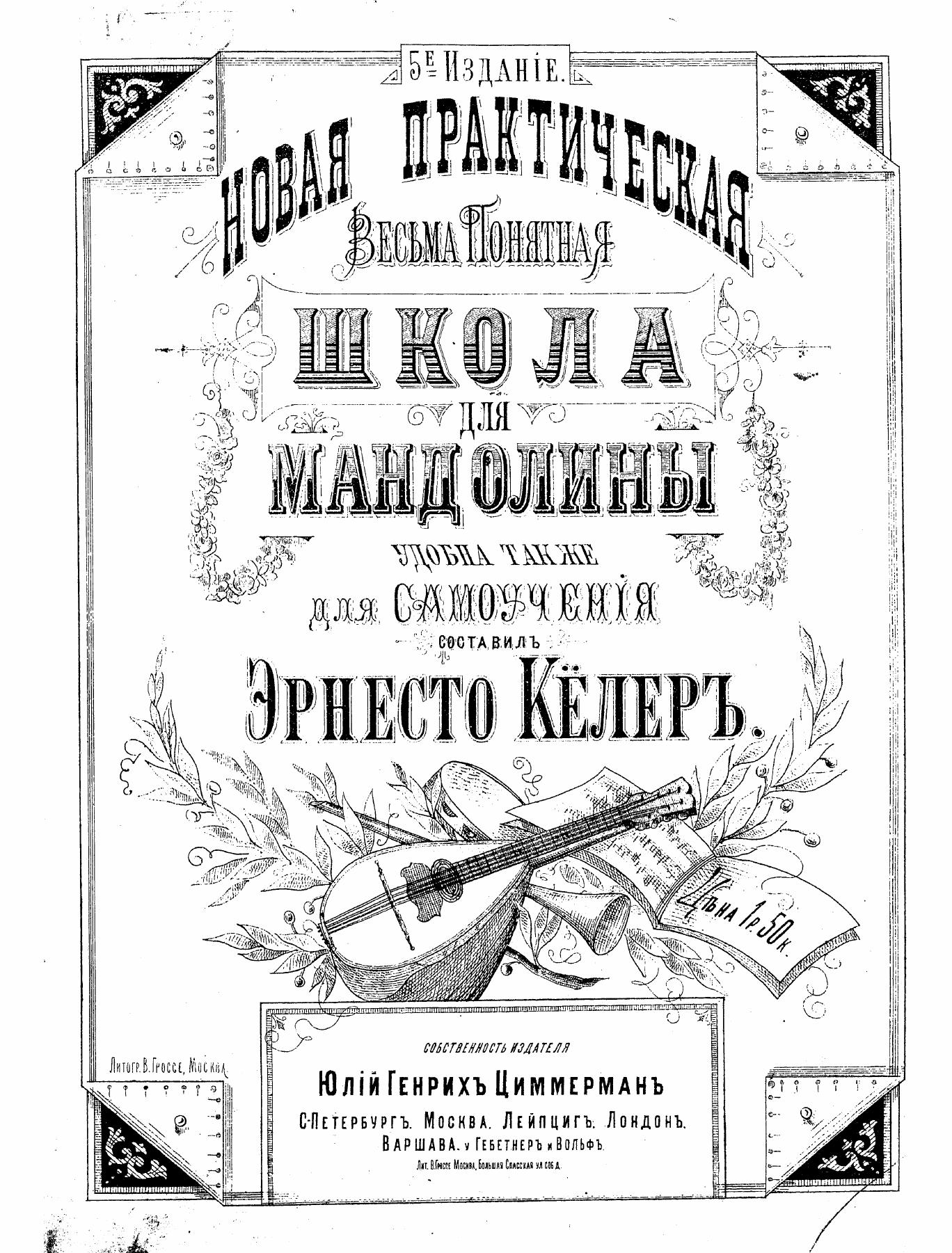
Cover of A New and Practical School for Mandolin (Новая практическая весьма понятная школа для мандолины) by Ernesto Köhler, with dual German-Russian entries. Version market to Germans was published c. 1887.

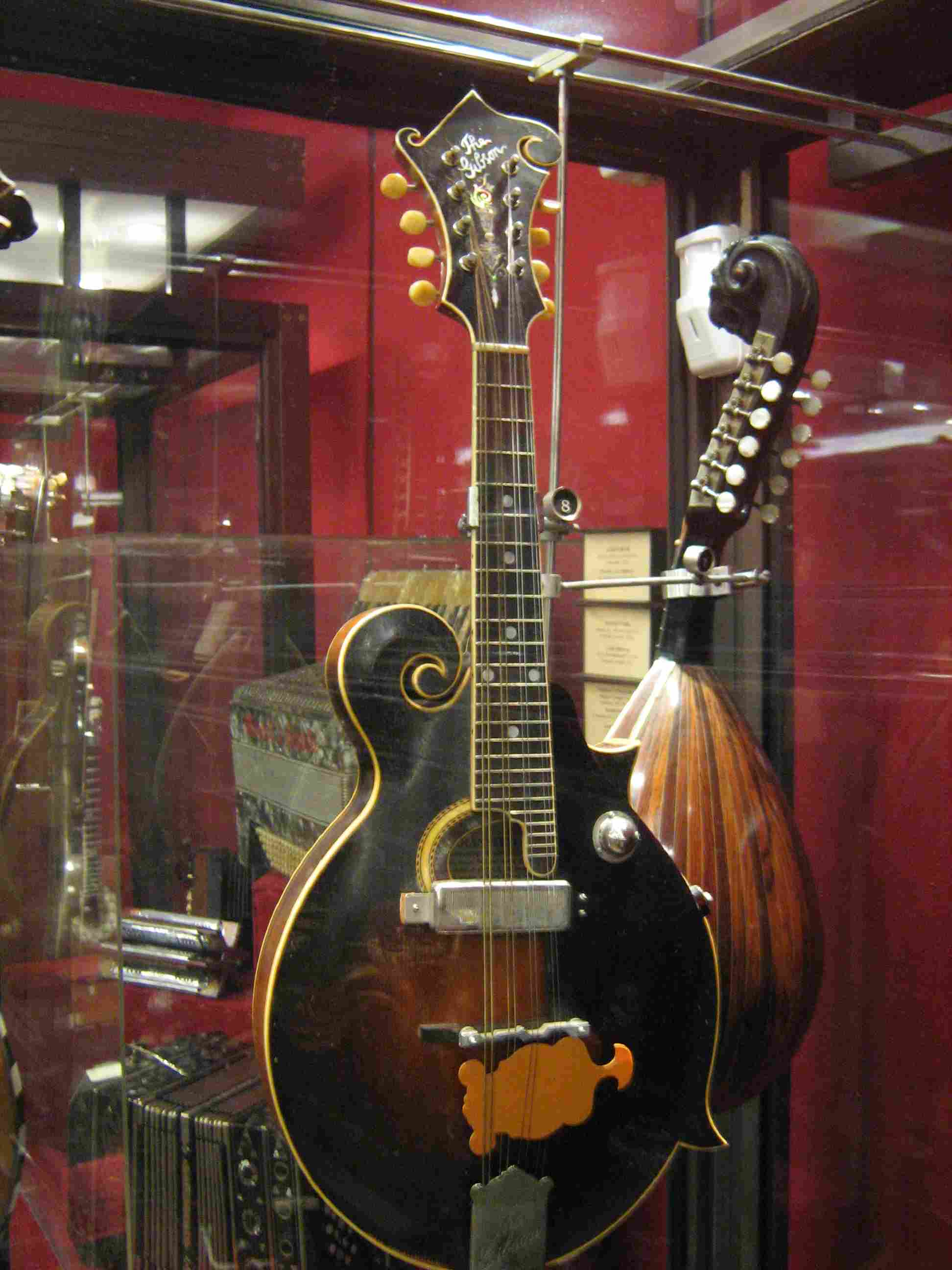
American-made Gibson mandolin, modified to electric with Russian-made pickups, at the Glinka National Museum Consortium of Musical Culture, Moscow, Russia.

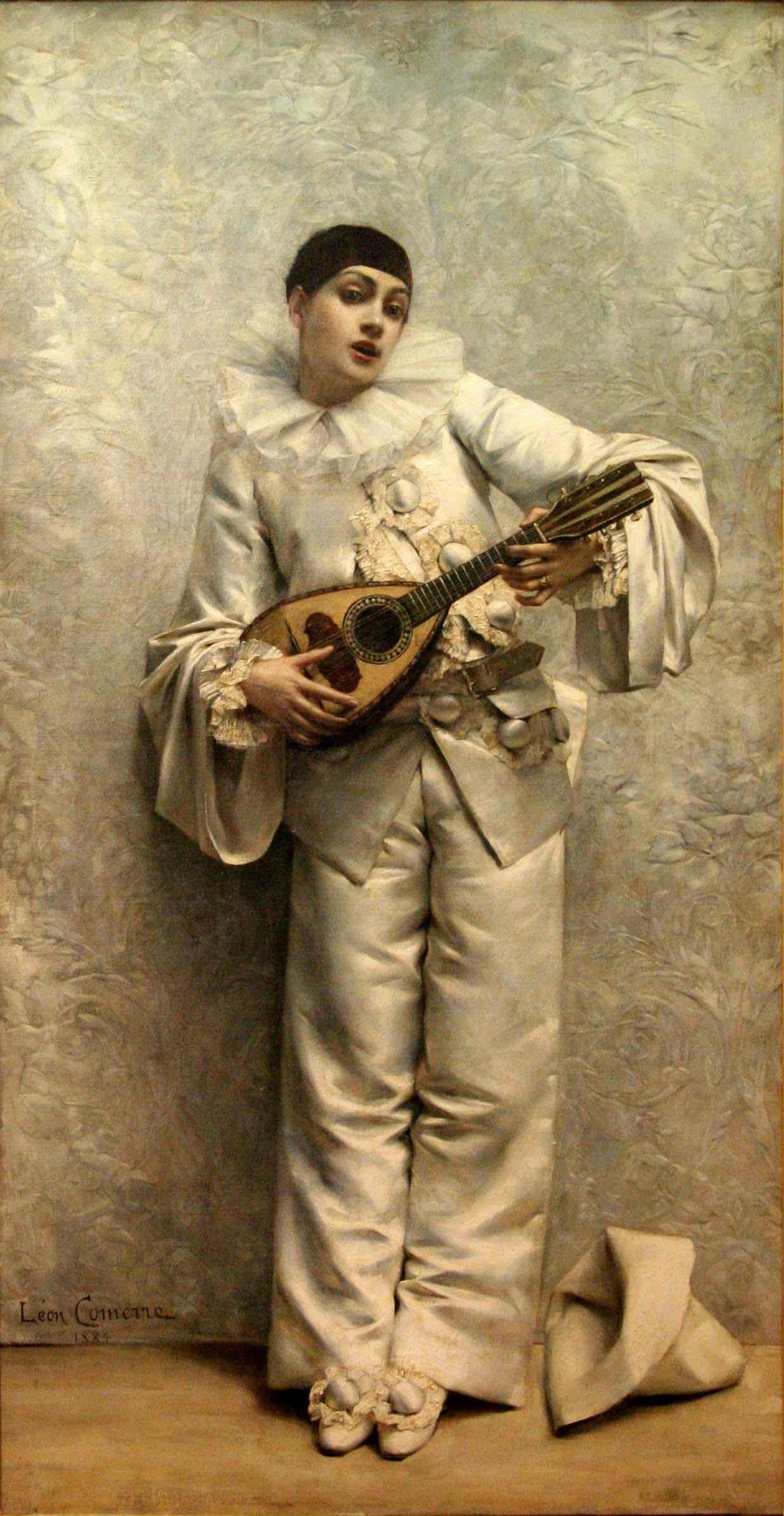
The 1976 Adventures of Buratino character, Pierrot, played a mandolin. Similarly, the French painter Léon Comerre painted this image of a mandolin-playing Pierrot in 1884.

The mandolin was popular in Russia in the pre-Soviet era and after as a folk instrument. Catalogs from the early 1900s offered a variety of bowlback mandolins, imports made by Italian companies. Locally made mandolins existed as well.

The first mandolin orchestra in Russia was put together in the early 1880s by an Italian immigrant, Ginislao Paris, called The Society of Amateur Mandolinists and Guitarists. Paris designed double-top mandolins, which he had Luigi Embergher build. At least one member of the royal family of Russia played the mandolin during this period, Tsarina Maria Fyodorovna who owned a Number 8 Embergher, a high-end instrument that would have been highly decorated.

There were talented mandolinists, in various parts of the country. Dave Apollon, who became a well-known (U.S.-based) player, was born in Kyiv, then part of Russia. After emigration from Russia, he was able to land a job in Vaudeville, exhibiting virtuosity.

After the rise of the Soviet Union, bowlback mandolins were not imported in the numbers they had been. Although possibly that had much to with the turmoil starting in 1917, of the country being reorganized into a communist state, the timing also coincides with the drop in popularity worldwide, as the mandolin's Golden Era peaked. The instrument had competition as a folk instrument as well, from the domra and balalaika. Vasily Andreyev who founded the first balalaika orchestra in Russia and resurrected the domra was inspired by a performance of Russia's first mandolin orchestra. The bowlback did not just disappear, as they are common in photos of mandolin orchestras in Eastern Europe in the 1930s. However, the mandolins produced in Soviet factories were of the cheap, flatback, "Portuguese" style—widespread throughout the Soviet Union.

In the 1970s and 80s, bluegrass music spread into Russia from Czechoslovakia, and through American performers touring in Russia, including Roy Clark and the Nitty Gritty Dirt Band. Russian bands were started with bluegrass elements that included a mandolin, including Kukuruza (with mandolinist Georgi Palmov) and Bering Strait (mandolinist Sergei Passov).

The mandolin was used in movies, including the 1976 film The Adventures of Buratino (Приключения Буратино) to accompany songs by Tortila and Pierro (Тортилы и Пьеро).

== South Africa ==
The mandolin has been a prominent instrument in the recordings of Johnny Clegg and his bands Juluka and Savuka. Since 1992, Andy Innes has been the mandolinist for Johnny Clegg and Savuka.

== Spain ==
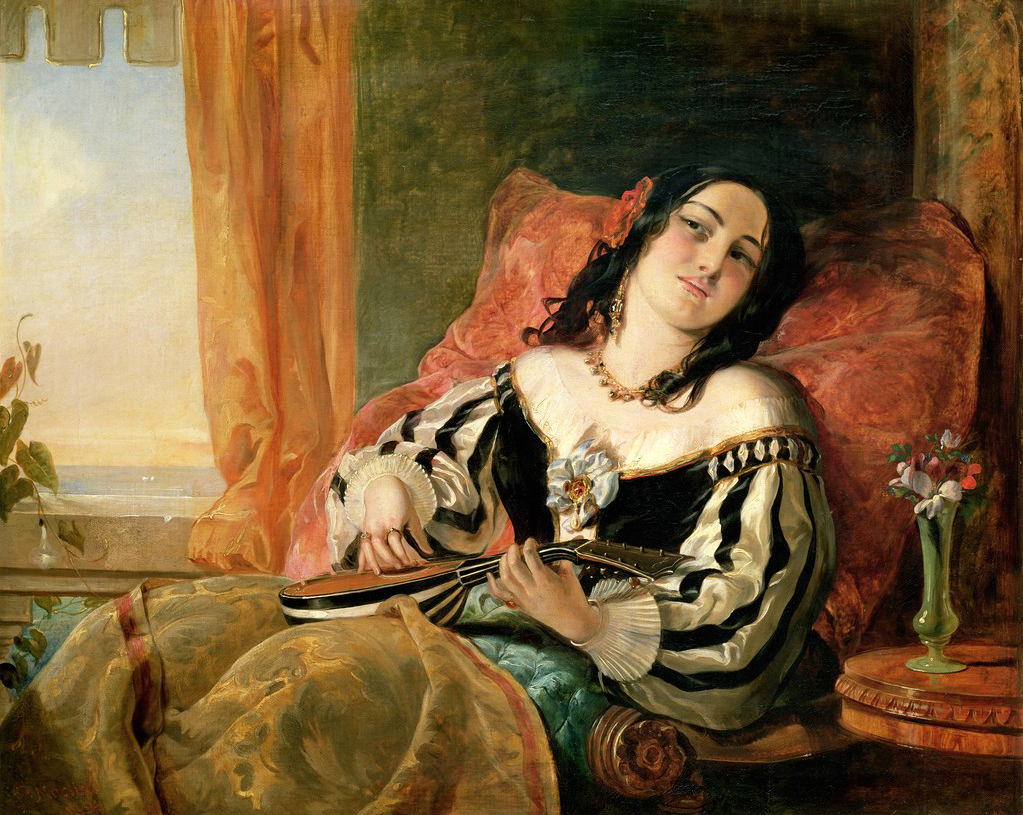
Painting by John Phillip in 1854, showing a Spanish woman with mandolin

According to historian Paul Sparks, Spain is "one of the few Western countries where the Neapolitan mandolin has never been widely played." As the mandolin was used in Italy to serenade young ladies and make music in the streets, the equally high pitched and plucked bandurria was used by Spanish youth to accompany their songs in the street and serenade. The instruments were used alongside guitars for traditional dances. The tradition of dancing to fast music was one of the draws of the Spanish Students when they went to Paris with their bandurrias, guitars and fiddles.

Both the Spanish bandurria and Italian mandolins ultimately were developments of the gittern and the mandore. In the 1880s, the mandolin and bandurria, with their small sizes and double rows of metal strings, were similar enough to be confused by ignorant audiences. This happened in America and, along with deception from opportunistic Italian musicians, led to the mandolin's expansion. Both instruments spread around the world from their original homes in Europe, the bandurria mainly in Spanish speaking areas such as South America and the Philippines.

In Spain today, the bandurria is a "national instrument." However, the mandolin can be learned there as well, especially by those pursuing a career as a classical musician. Although professional Spanish mandolinists may be rare, but they do exist: Hector Marin developed his skill with the mandolin sufficiently to complete in the Yasuo Kuwahara International Mandolin Competition in Germany in 2015. The competition that year had 11 other "virtuosos of the mandolin" competing, six from Germany and five from Russia. Marin, spoke in an interview, of learning first the bandurria and then later the mandolin, concentrating on the latter for having a broader range of classical material to play. He benefited from European culture, having teachers in both Spain and elsewhere in Europe as he pursued music. Marin attended several schools, including in Austria. He cited Juan Carlos Muñoz (Spanish, teaching in Austria), Mari Fe Pavón, Caterina Lichtenberg (German) and Avi Avital (Israeli) as his mandolin-playing musical influences.

== Sri Lanka ==
The mandolin was brought to Sri Lanka by the Portuguese, who colonized Sri Lanka from 1505 to 1658. The instrument has been heavily used in baila, a genre of Sri Lankan music formed from a mixture of Portuguese, African and Sinhala music. For example, the mandolin features prominently in M.S. Fernando's baila song, Bola Bola Meti. Victor Rathnayaka's Thaniwennata Mage Lowe, Sunil Perera & Gypsies Saima Cut wela and Sujatha Athanayaka's Hathara watin Kalukaragena are among other examples of songs with mandolin. Modern-day musicians include Antony Surendra, V. Hemapala Perera, Ananda Perera, Dinesh Subasinghe, Susantha Kariyakarawana, Sarath Fernando, Nalaka Sajee, Haasriza Imran and Buddhika Perera

== Tobago and Trinidad ==
The mandolin has a history on Tobago and Trinidad as the bandolin, dating back before World War I. It was a small instrument, approximately 20 x 40 centimeters, strung with 8 strings in four courses of two each. Before the war, it was commonly a round-backed instrument, made of strips of wood. The flat-backed version appeared after the war. Occasionally a turtle shell would be used for the back of the instrument. It is used in Trinidad's parang music, accompanied by "cuatro and maracas". There is another member of the mandolin family, the Trinidadian version of the bandol, different from the mainland bandola. It is the tenor of the mandolin family on the island, also strung with 8 strings in 4 courses; however, the lower two string courses are strung differently, each having a metal and a nylon string.

== Turkey ==
Turkey has been the home of a mandolin-banjo manufacturer, Cümbüs, since the early 20th century. The country had what may be its first Mandolin festival in June 2015, and has at least one Mandolin Orchestra. Mandolin playing in Turkey has been associated with contemporary musicians and ensembles, including performers who incorporate the instrument into folk and other musical styles.

One professional musician to use the mandolin is Sumru Ağıryürüyen who is known for singing and playing many styles of music including world music, Klezmer, Turkish folk, Balkan folk, blues, jazz, krautrock, protest rock and maqam.

== Ukraine ==
The Mandolin has been played in Ukraine, and pictures of it being played today can be found online. One famous former resident of Kyiv was Dave Apollon. Other photos dating back to the early 20th century show Ukrainian Mandolin orchestras in Canada and the United States. One of the offshoots of Ukrainian immigrants to North America is the Toronto Mandolin Orchestra (possibly the oldest mandolin orchestra in North America), which claims Ukrainians as among its founders. The orchestra's web site said of mandolins in Ukraine, that the instruments were popular in the early 20th century, but never reached folk-instrument status there. Ukrainian immigrants of the period took the instruments with them to their new countries.

The instrument has had to compete in Ukraine with native instruments that have been revived, such as the kobza. The orchestral variant of the kobza is similar to the Mandolin, having four strings and being tuned in fifths.

== United Kingdom ==
See British mandolinists

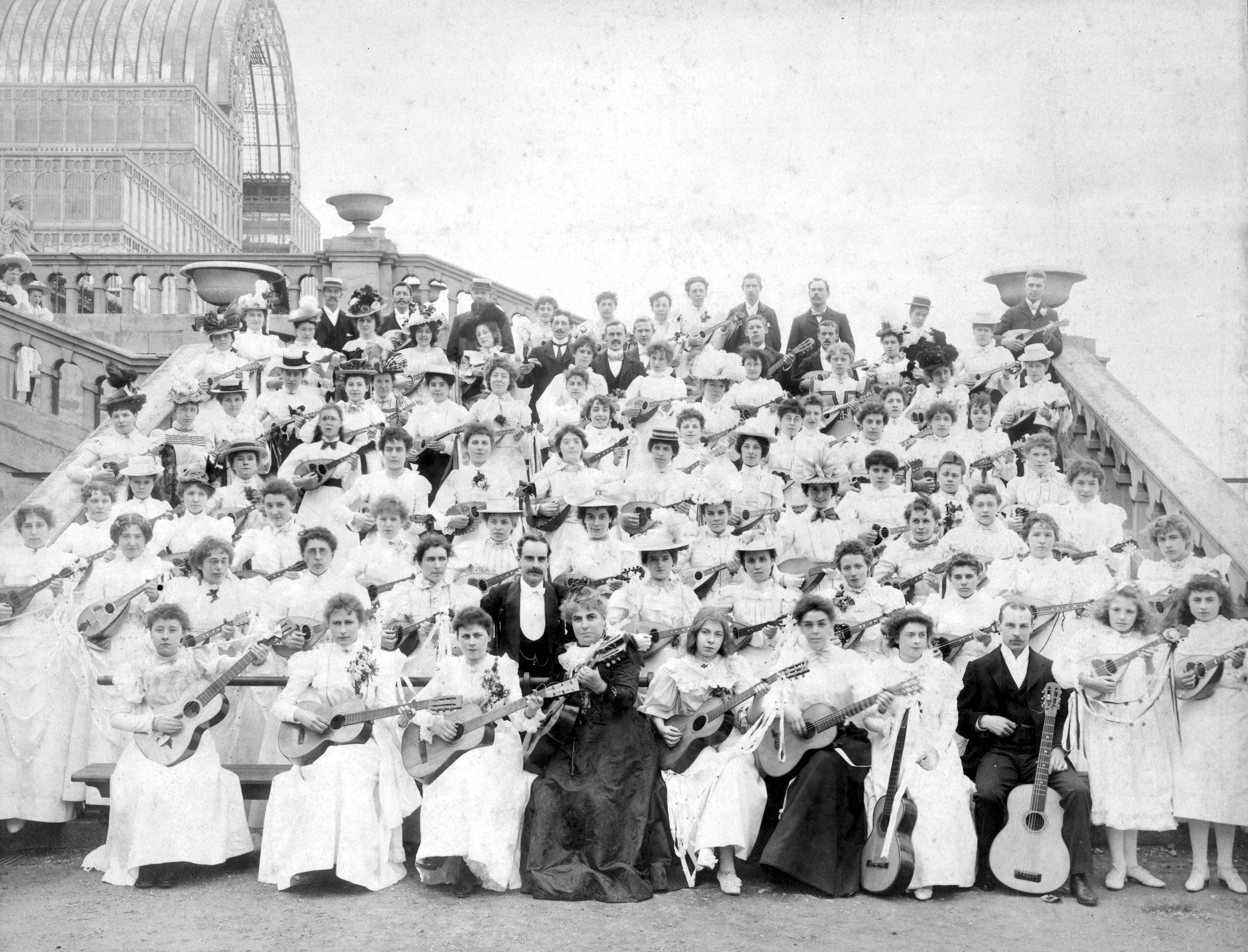
The Polytechnic and People's Palace Mandoline and Guitar Band in 1899 at the Crystal Palace.

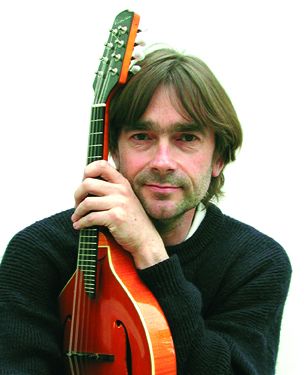
Simon Mayor has worked at creating a uniquely British voice for the mandolin.

The mandolin has been used extensively in the traditional music of England and Scotland for generations. Simon Mayor is a prominent British player who has produced six solo albums, instructional books and DVDs, as well as recordings with his mandolin quartet the Mandolinquents.

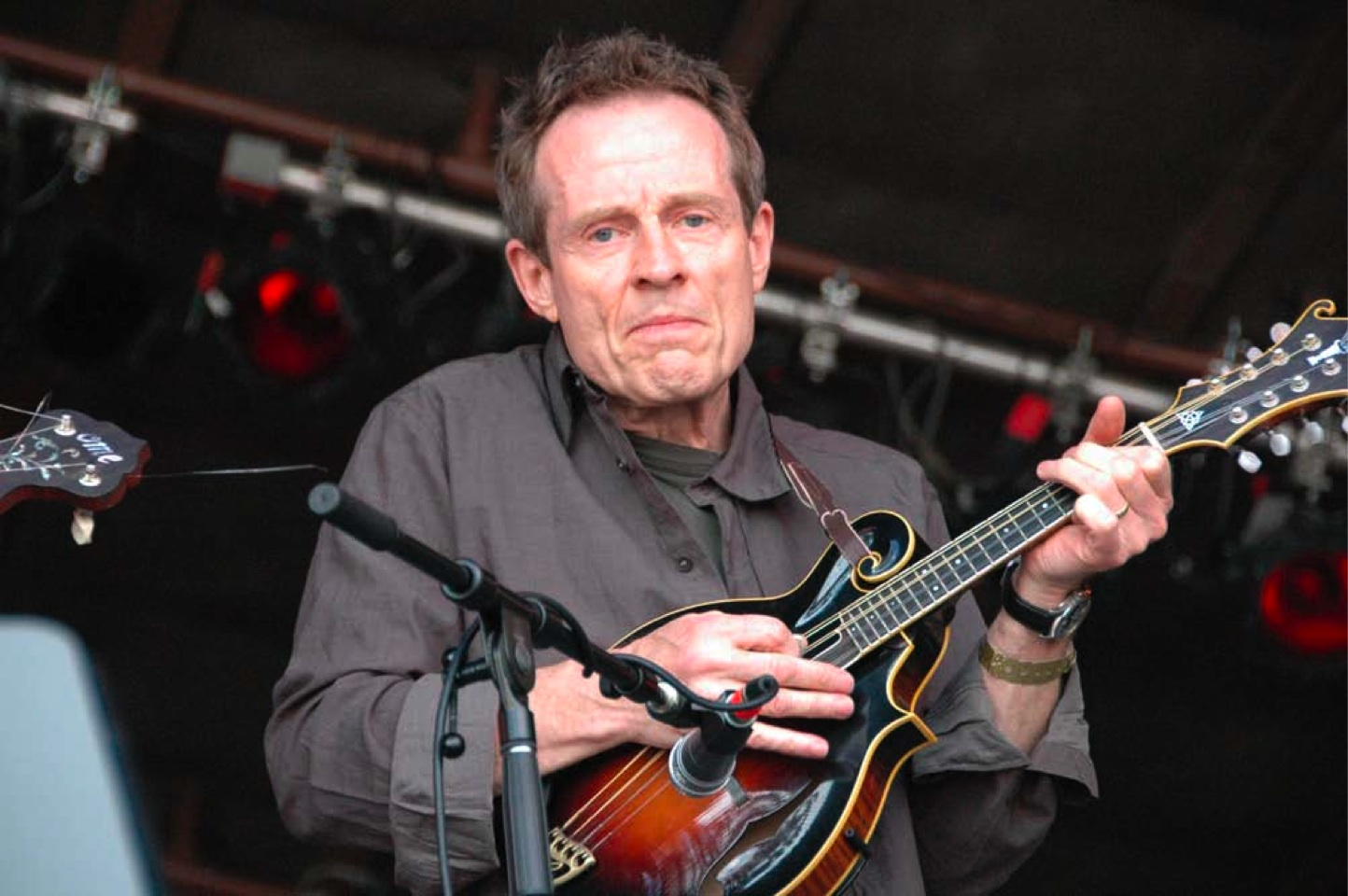
John Paul Jones playing mandolin with The Duhks on Zeppelin's "Whole Lotta Love" at MerleFest, 2007.

The instrument has also found its way into British rock music. The mandolin was played by Mike Oldfield (and introduced by Vivian Stanshall) on Oldfield's album Tubular Bells, as well as on a number of his subsequent albums (particularly prominently on Hergest Ridge (1974) and Ommadawn (1975)). It was used extensively by the British folk-rock band Lindisfarne, who featured two members on the instrument, Ray Jackson and Simon Cowe, and whose "Fog on the Tyne" was the biggest selling UK album of 1971–72. The instrument was also used extensively in the UK folk revival of the 1960s and 1970s with bands such as Fairport Convention and Steeleye Span taking it on as the lead instrument in many of their songs. "Maggie May" by Rod Stewart, which hit No. 1 on both the British charts and the Billboard Hot 100, also featured Jackson's playing. It has also been used by other British rock musicians. Led Zeppelin's bassist John Paul Jones is an accomplished mandolin player and has recorded numerous songs on mandolin including "Going to California" and "That's the Way"; the mandolin part on "The Battle of Evermore" is played by Jimmy Page, who composed the song. Other Led Zeppelin songs featuring mandolin are "Hey Hey What Can I Do", and "Black Country Woman". Pete Townshend of the Who played mandolin on the track "Mike Post Theme", along with many other tracks on Endless Wire. McGuinness Flint, for whom Graham Lyle played the mandolin on their most successful single, When I'm Dead And Gone, is another example. Lyle was also briefly a member of Ronnie Lane's Slim Chance, and played mandolin on their hit "How Come". One of the more prominent early mandolin players in popular music was Robin Williamson in the Incredible String Band. Ian Anderson of Jethro Tull is a highly accomplished mandolin player, as is his guitarist Martin Barre. The popular song "Please Please Please Let Me Get What I Want" by the Smiths featured a mandolin solo played by Johnny Marr. More recently, British folk-punk icons the Levellers also regularly use the mandolin in their songs. British comedian Ade Edmondson took the role of lead mandolin in his folk punk band, Bad Shepherds. Current bands are also beginning to use the mandolin and its unique sound, such as South London's Indigo Moss who use it throughout their recordings and live gigs. The mandolin has also featured in the playing of Matt Bellamy in the rock band Muse. It also forms the basis of Paul McCartney's 2007 hit "Dance Tonight". That was not the first time a Beatle played a mandolin, however; that distinction goes to George Harrison on "Gone Troppo", the title cut from the 1982 album of the same name. Also more recently hard rock supergroup Them Crooked Vultures have been playing a song, Highway One in which Jones "morphs an effected mandolin bluegrass run into a slick rock riff". This song was left off their debut album Them Crooked Vultures, and features former Led Zeppelin bassist John Paul Jones.

In the Classical style, performers such as Hugo D'Alton, Alison Stephens and Michael Hooper have continued to play music by British composers such as Michael Finnissy, James Humberstone and Elspeth Brooke.

The mandolin is taught in Lanarkshire by the Lanarkshire Guitar and Mandolin Association to over 100 people.

== United States ==
See: Mandolins in North America and Bluegrass mandolin

See American mandolinists and American bluegrass mandolinists

The mandolin has had a place in North American culture since the 1880s, when a "mandolin craze" began.

The continent was a land of immigrants, including Italian immigrants, some of whom brought their mandolins with them. In spite of the mandolin having arrived in America, it was not in the national consciousness until after 1880 when the Spanish Students arrived on their international performing tour. Afterwards, a "mandolin craze" swept the United States, with large numbers of young people taking up the instrument and teachers such as Samuel Siegel touring the country. The fad died out after World War I, but enough had learned the instrument that it remained. The mandolin found a new surge with the music of Bill Monroe; the Gibson F-5 mandolin he played, as well as other archtop instruments, became the American standard for mandolins. Bowlback mandolins were displaced. The instrument has been taken up in blues, bluegrass, jug-band music, country, rock, punk, Celtic and other genres of music. While not as popular as the guitar, it is widespread across the country.

== Venezuela ==
As in Brazil, the mandolin has played an important role in the Music of Venezuela. It has enjoyed a privileged position as the main melodic instrument in several different regions of the country. Specifically, the eastern states of Sucre, Nueva Esparta, Anzoategui and Monagas have made the mandolin the main instrument in their versions of Joropo as well as Puntos, Jotas, Polos, Fulias, Merengues and Malagueñas. Also, in the west of the country, the sound of the mandolin is intrinsically associated with the regional genres of the Venezuelan Andes: Bambucos, Pasillos, Pasodobles, and Waltzes. In the western city of Maracaibo the Mandolin has been played in Decimas, Danzas and Contradanzas Zulianas; in the capital, Caracas, the Merengue Rucaneao, Pasodobles and Waltzes have also been played with a mandolin for almost a century. Today, Venezuelan mandolists include an important group of virtuoso players and ensembles such as Alberto Valderrama, Jesus Rengel, Ricardo Sandoval, Saul Vera, and Cristobal Soto.

== Vietnam ==
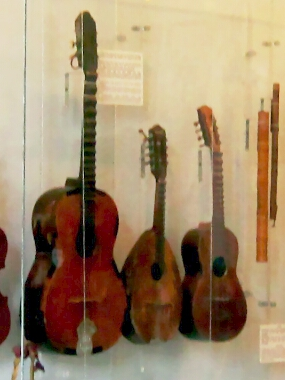
Three musical instruments with scalloped necks, guitar, mandolin, and a possible hybrid of the two.

The French ruled Vietnam completely by 1884 and set up a system of modern education. The population was exposed to French culture and music, which included the mandolin. The influence of French culture was strong enough to affect Vietnamese music. They began writing lyrics to French pop music in Vietnamese and teaching themselves other western instruments including mandolin, guitar, Hawaiian guitar and banjo. Through the Catholics and later the conservatories, European classical music and instruments were taught, including piano and bowed instruments.

The mandolin and guitar were played in both classical music and pop music. Although used in popular music, both instruments were also taught in the Saigon National Conservatory (now the Conservatory of Ho Chi Minh City). However, the mandolin has disappeared from the conservatory where it had been taught, apparently dropped from the curriculum. Instead of Guitar-Mandolin department, the school lists Guitar-Accordion.

Though probably never a dominant instrument, the mandolin was learned by enough people to have a presence among the settlers who left Vietnam for the United States, and who continued to play mandolins in their new home. There are still people in Vietnam playing as well, although the cost of a new instrument is prohibitive. There is at least one mandolin orchestra still playing, a group of aging players teaching newcomers.

Vietnamese luthiers have worked with mandolin design. Mandolins being made in Vietnam today for the international market use the French flatback style. However, some Vietnamese luthiers have added their own innovation, putting sound holes in the mandolins' sides.

The luthiers also worked with the idea of modifying the mandolin to meet local musical styles, making experimental changes to the necks of violins, guitars and mandolins to suit them to Cai luong opera music. In the mid-1930s, they made concave frets, scooping out extra wood between the frets, making the space between them deep and to allow the musicians to bend the notes, and stringing them with four single strings. Musicians Hai Nén and Hai Nhành were associated with the instruments, possibly being the first to use them. The sunken-fret mandolin (mandolin phím lõm) did not meet the musical needs as well as the sunken-fret guitar, because the mandolin's rigidity made it painful to get the same effects from the strings. Also the mandolin's narrow fretboard made it difficult to hit the notes. Another reason to move to a bigger instrument was the pitch range of the mandolin, high pitched and not as useful to accompany singing as the instruments that replaced it in the opera.
