= Silvio Ranieri =

Italian Mandolin virtuoso (1882–1956)

- Born: 1882; Rome
- Died: 1956 (aged 73–74)
- Occupation: Mandolinist

Silvio Ranieri (1882 – 1956) was an Italian Mandolin virtuoso. Born in Rome, he gave his first concert in 1897, aged fifteen, and he went on to tour Europe to great acclaim. It was his desire to elevate the Mandolin to a status similar to the violin in classical music, and he did much to contribute to the immense popularity of the mandolin in the 1920s. Later settling in Brussels, he established a tradition of Mandolin music in northern Europe. He always played Mandolins produced by Luigi Embergher, which he compared to the Stradivarius violin in perfection. Ranieri once visited Embergher's shop in Rome and tried out an instrument marked Gold Medal Paris 1900. When he wanted to buy it, the luthier replied that it was not for sale, but that he could play it at the evening recital. After the recital, Embergher approached Ranieri and offered him the instrument as a gift.

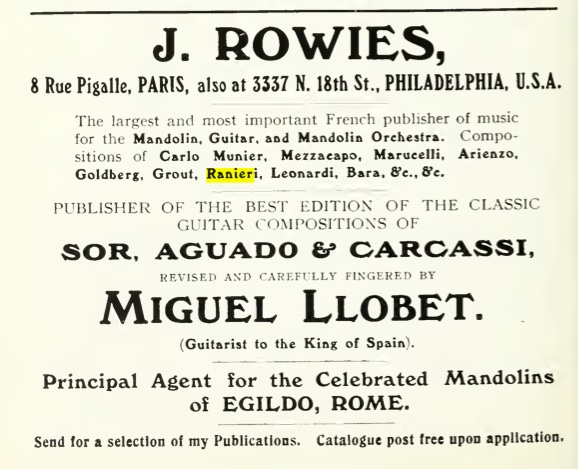
Advertisement for music publisher J. Rowies (Philadelphia, Pennsylvania) for mandolin sheet music. Artists include Ranieri and other mandolinists of his day, including Carlo Munier, Salvador Leonardi, Edgar Bara and Eduardo Mezzacapo. Taken from the book The guitar and mandolin, Biographies of celebrated players and composers for these instruments by Philip J. Bone, published by Schott and Company, London, 1914.

== See also ==
- List of mandolinists (sorted)
