= Giovanni Fouchetti =

Giovanni Fouchetti (pronounced [fuˈketti], fl.1757-1789) published one of the earliest method books for the mandolin, c. 1771. According to Philip J. Bone, Fouchetti was also known as Fouquet, and he lived in Paris during the 18th Century. He was a professor there in 1788. He is also credited with creating a Parisian school of mandolinists, along with Eduardo Mezzacapo, Gabriele Leone, and Gervasio.

His book Méthode pour apprendre facilement á jouer de la mandoline á 4 et á 6 cordes; dans la quelle on explique les differents coups de plume nécessaires pour cet instrument. On y a joint six sérenades et six petites sonates (Method for learning to play easily the mandolin of four or six strings. In which different pen strokes are needed to explain this instrument, with six serenades and six small sonatas) was republished in 1983 with methods by Gabriele Leone and Pietro Denis, both of whose methods were originally published in 1768. The 1983 book was called Méthodes de mandolin de Leone, Fouchetti, Denis.

== Controversy ==
One of Giovanni Fouchetti's works Allegro from the fourth sonata was published by Hoffmeister under the name Pietro Fouchetti; no one who has addressed the issue has come up with a reason.
