= Edgar Bara =

French musician (1876–1962)

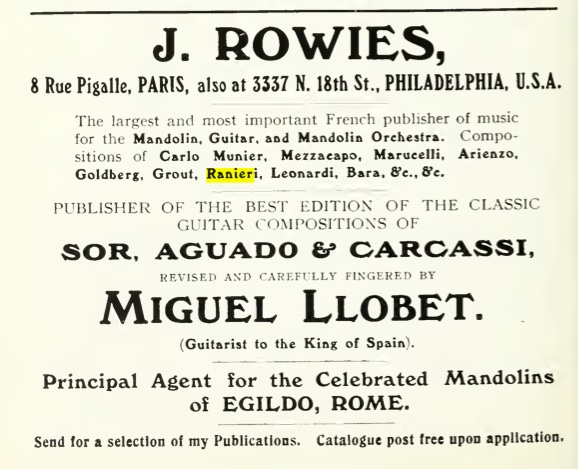
Advertisement for music publisher J. Rowies (Philadelphia, Pennsylvania) for mandolin sheet music. Included mention of Bara, alongside Salvador Leonardi, Eduardo Mezzacapo, Enrico Marucelli, Silvio Ranieri and Carlo Munier. Taken from the book The guitar and mandolin, Biographies of celebrated players and composers for these instruments by Philip J. Bone, published by Schott and Company, London, 1914.

Edgar Bara (1876–1962) was a mandolinist, author and composer. He wrote the method book Méthode de Mandoline et Banjoline, published 1903 in the United States, one of the few from that era which is still in print today, in France. He was also a conductor of a mandolin orchestra in Paris, the Cercle Mandoliniste in 1907.

== Works ==
- Lucia di Lammermoor
- Une Nuit à Bone Sérénade algérienne (pour violon et piano) Op. 103
- Une Fête à Séville, boléro
- Les Hallebardiers passent! Retraite pour piano et mandoline Op. 48
- La Veuve joyeuse, célèbre valse de Franz Lehar. Arrangée pour violon (ou mandoline) ou piano
- La Traviata, opéra de Verdi. Fantaisie
- La Norma, opéra de V. Bellini. Fantaisie pour mandoline et piano Op. 52
- La Esméralda, piano
- Indiscrétion, piano

== See also ==
- List of mandolinists (sorted)
