= Avi Avital =

Israeli musician

Avi Avital אבי אביטל
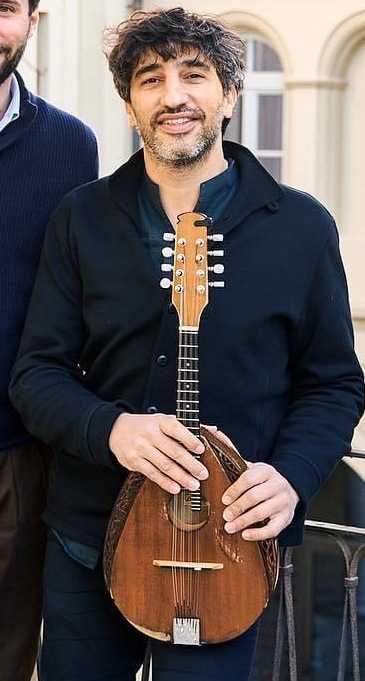
- Avi Avital with mandolin

Background information
- Born: 19 October 1978 (age 47); Be'er Sheva, Israel
- Genres: chamber music, classical music
- Instrument: mandolin
- Label: Deutsche Grammophon
- Website: www.aviavital.com

Avi Avital playing mandolin in St. Florian Monastery

Avi Avital (Hebrew: אבי אביטל; born 19 October 1978) is an Israeli mandolinist. He is best known for his renditions of well-known Baroque and folk music, much of which was originally written for other instruments. He has been nominated for a Grammy Award (Best Instrumental Soloist with Ensemble) and in 2013 signed a record agreement with Deutsche Grammophon.

== Early life ==
Avital was born in the Israeli city of Be'er Sheva and showed an aptitude for the mandolin at an early age; by the time he was eight years old, he was performing with a local orchestra. He went on to study at the Jerusalem Academy of Music and the Cesare Pollini Conservatory of Music in Padua, Italy, where the focus of his work moved from mandolin transcriptions of violin pieces to those originally written with his instrument in mind. His study in Italy was sponsored by the America-Israel Cultural Foundation.

== Performance career ==
Avital has performed at Carnegie Hall and the Lincoln Center in New York, the National Centre for the Performing Arts, the Forbidden City Concert Hall in Beijing, and the Berlin Philharmonie with international orchestras and chamber groups. In 2011, he performed throughout Australia with the Australian Brandenburg Orchestra, and again in 2016, with performances in Sydney, Melbourne and Brisbane. In 2013, he played on a tour with the Geneva Camerata. In addition to the Grammy nomination, he has won Israel's Aviv Competition and received Germany's ECHO Prize.

Avital's recording debut, a collection of sonatas and concertos entitled Bach, was released on June 12, 2012.

== Repertoire ==
Avital continues a tradition of virtuosic mandolin players that has brought the mandolin in classical music to public attention. Largely dormant as a group since the 1920s, players are again getting attention for performing new arrangements with the mandolin, including Italians Carlo Aonzo and Mauro Squillante, Americans Chris Thile, Joseph Brent and Mike Marshall, and Israelis Tom Cohen, Jacob Reuven and Alon Sariel.

Avital set out to successfully improve the mandolin's place in the world. After his concert at Carnegie Hall, he considers that accomplishment as evidence for a renaissance for the mandolin, of its increasing prominence in classical music. In 2012, he became the first mandolinist to be signed to the label Deutsche Grammophon. As of the fall of 2016, he added approximately 90 new mandolin pieces to the mandolin's repertoire.

Avital's career not simply involves digging into the archive of music historically played on the mandolin. That repertoire of music is relatively small. Aware of his role in bringing the mandolin into the concert hall, he realized that adding to the "quality repertoire" of the instrument is important for its future. He also specifically targets the perception that the instrument is limited by taking on "monumental works" by composers such as Bach to change the public's perception of his instrument.

Although he makes new arrangements of classical works not originally intended for mandolin, Avital has also added new music to the repertoire of classical mandolin music. Travelling around the world he recognized that the mandolin has been played in folk music everywhere he went. Therefore, he began to merge folk music for the mandolin with classical music, including Bulgarian, Welsh, and Klezmer music on his second album titled Between Worlds. In concerts and recordings, Avital has been performing with other musicians in world music and jazz.
