= Bandol (instrument) =

String instrument
- Classification: String instrument
- Hornbostel–Sachs classification: (Composite chordophone)
- Developed: Trinidad

Related instruments
- Mandolin, Mandola, Bandola

The bandol, bandola, or criolla mandolin is a string instrument in Trinidad and Tobago with four double courses of strings, totaling eight strings. It is the tenor representative of the mandolin family on Trinidad. Another member is the higher pitched Trinidadian bandolin.

On the bandol, thelower two courses are strung with one steel string and one nylon for each course, and the higher two courses have all nylon (or gut) strings. The bandol is used in Trinidadian parang music, accompanied by "cuatro, maracas" (the main instruments) and the bandolin .
