= Eduardo Mezzacapo =

Italian composer

Mezzacapo Quartet. Eduardo Mezzacapo (center).

Eduardo Mezzacapo (1832–1898) was an Italian mandolinist, recognized as a virtuoso. He was also a composer, and a performer, organizing and playing in a mandolin quartet in France. Although he died before recording technology, his quartet did get recorded between 1905 and 1910. He was also the founder of l'Ecole de mandoline française (The French Mandolin School).

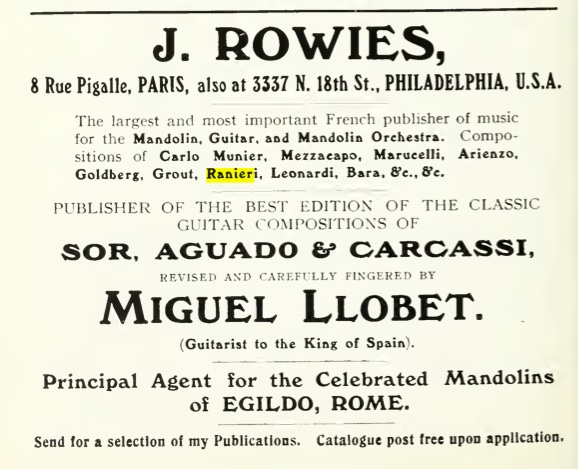
Advertisement for music publisher J. Rowies (Philadelphia, Pennsylvania) for mandolin sheet music. Artists include Silvio Ranieri and other mandolinists of his day, including Carlo Munier, Enrico Marucelli, Edgar Bara, and Salvador Leonardi. Taken from the book The guitar and mandolin, Biographies of celebrated players and composers for these instruments by Philip J. Bone, published by Schott and Company, London, 1914.

At the time that he was teaching in France and at the school, the mandolin was regaining popularity. There had been a decline since the early 19th century, but around the beginning of the 20th century from the 1880s to the 1920s there was a mandolin "craze" in which the instrument enjoyed new popularity. The movement in France was enough to found a movement of French mandolin artists, including Gabriel Leone, Giovanni Fouchetti and Gervasio. Mezzacapo "became the most important exponent of his time," through his performing and organizing and teaching.

Mezzacapo studied the mandolin in Naples, but went to France before he was 20. He performed with his family there, and their success was such that they performed Verdi's Othello in the Opéra Garnier. He also directed the Casino of Cannes orchestra, in the lounge of the Grand Duke of Mecklenburg. His work led him to be given credit for adding to the mandolin's successful rise as an orchestral instrument. He was also given the honor of having an orchestral work dedicated to him, the Enrico Marucelli work Valtzer Fantastico.

== Discrepancy ==
There is some confusion as to when Eduardo Mezzacapo died. His death date is given as 1898 and 1947. The later date may refer to a son.

== Works ==
- Aubade for Mandolin, Violin and Guitar
- Tarantella “Napoli” (1)
- Le Chant du Gondolier (Barcarolle)
- Marche des Mandolinistes
- Souvenir de Russie (Valse) (1)
- Souvenir de Naples (Valse) (1)
- Souvenir de Blois(Valse) (1)
- Bébé savant (Polka) (1)
- Regret (Romance sans paroles) (1)
- Petite Mignonne (Air de gavotte) (1)
- Élégance (Mazurka de salon) (1)
- Beaux yeux (Schottisch) (1)
- Paris (Marche) (1) Dedicated to "his pupil (prince) Robert de Broglie"
- Amitié (Polka) (1)
- Très jolie (Polka) (1)
- Princesse (Gavotte) (1)
- Duchesse (Gavotte) (1)
- Miniature (petite valse) (1)
- Tristesse (romance sans paroles) (1)
- Sérénade Barcarolle (1)
- Tolède Boléro (Gavotte) (1)
- Mandoline Polka (1)
- Mina (Gavotte) (1)
- Violettes (Polka) (1)
- Menuet Louis XV (1)
- Gavotte Pompadour (1)
- Sympathie (Valse) (1)
- Vision mélodie (1)
- Chez la marquise (Canzonetta) (1)
- Charme d'Espagne (Habanera) (1)
- Invocation (romance sans paroles) (1)
- Idéal (valse) (1)
- Bonita (sérénade-boléro) (1)
- Etincelles (galop) (1)
- Réponse (au rêve amoureux), mazurka (1)

(1) Work mentioned in a series of pieces for mandoline and piano (or guitar) entitled "Oeuvres pour mandoline par E. Mezzacapo" (Works form mandoline by E. Mezzacapo) at the back of "Paris, marche", published in Paris, s.d.

== See also ==
- List of mandolinists (sorted)
- Wiesenekker performers, has online mp3 of their rendition of Tarantella "Napoli"
