= Bandolin (Trinidad) =

Trinidadian variation of the mandolin

The Trinidad bandolin is a variation of the mandolin, smaller, approximately 24 x 40 centimeters. Its identity as a distinct instrument comes partly from changes made to the instrument on the island after World War I. Before that time, the instrument had a rounded back made of strips of wood, or occasionally the shell of a turtle. Today it can have either a flat or rounded back; the two are generally though not totally considered to be separate instruments. According to Lise Winer in the Dictionary of the English/Creole of Trinidad & Tobago: On Historical Principles, some people use the term mandolin for the flat-backed instrument and bandolin for the round-backed instrument. The instrument has four courses of steel strings, like a standard mandolin and distinct from the Ecuadorean bandolin. The latter uses four courses of triple strings and is tuned in fourths. A standard mandolin uses four courses of double strings and is tuned in fifths.

The Trinidad bandolin is also seen as distinct from the Trinidadian bandol or bandola, which is the tenor instrument in the same family. It is used in Trinidad's parang music, accompanied by "cuatro, bandola and maracas".
