= Toronto Mandolin Orchestra =

Canadian musical ensemble

The Toronto Mandolin Orchestra is a musical ensemble based in Toronto, Ontario, Canada. The orchestra performs both separately and as part of the Shevchenko Musical Ensemble. It was formed in 1956 as a revival of a tradition of mandolin orchestras in Toronto's Ukrainian and eastern European immigrant communities.

== History ==
=== Background ===
Mandolin orchestras were common among the Ukrainian and Jewish immigrant population in Toronto in the early 20th century. The Toronto Children's Mandolin Orchestra, founded in 1923, performed at the Ukrainian Labour Temple and toured in northern Ontario in 1926.

The first group to be called the Toronto Mandolin Orchestra was founded in July, 1931 with 27 members. It began giving performances at the Jewish Workers Cultural Centre on Brunswick Avenue in Toronto. Sometimes known as the Jewish Workers Mandolin Orchestra, the group played mainly traditional Ukrainian and other eastern European folk music. The orchestra soon expanded to about 50 members.

By 1937, the group had about 45 members; During World War II, the orchestra performed at military training camps.

=== Shevchenko Musical Ensemble ===
The current Toronto Mandolin Orchestra was formed in 1956 by Eugene Dolny, who was a conductor and music director for the Association of United Ukrainian-Canadians. The orchestra formed a part of the National Shevchenko Musical Ensemble, which also included a choir and a dance group. The orchestra's musicians play a variety of instruments, with various sizes of mandolins forming the string section.

In 1964 the orchestra toured western Canada with the Shevchenko Male Chorus.

The Ensemble performed at Expo 67, at Massey Hall, and were recorded for CBC Radio. In 1970 they toured in the USSR.

In 2010 the orchestra performed in Welland, Ontario with the Desna Ukrainian Dancers. The orchestra also staged its "Mandolins of the World" show in Peterborough, Ontario in 2013.
