= Mandolin Melodies Museum =

Museum in Nagoya, Aichi, Japan

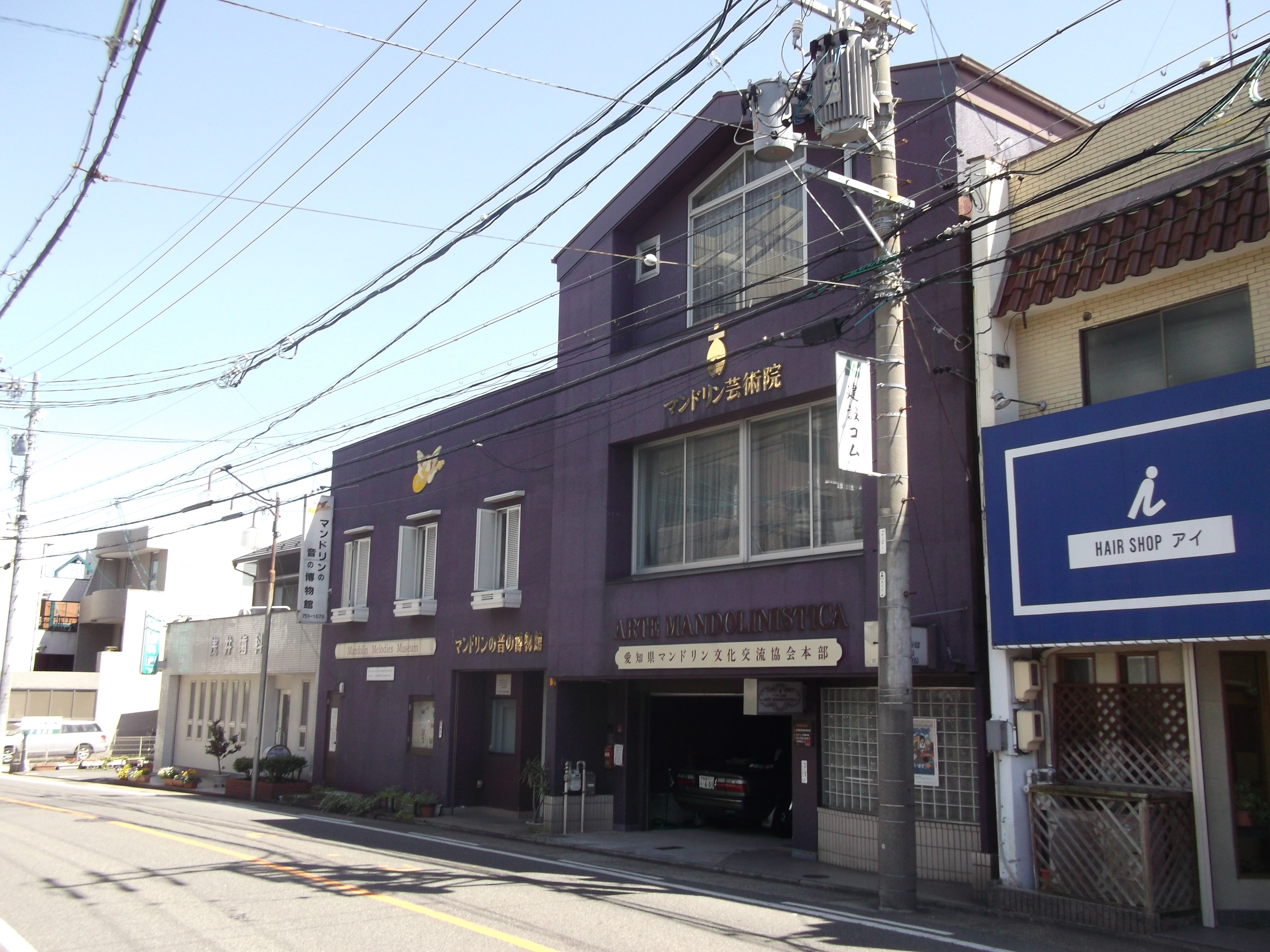
- Established: May 8, 1995
- Location: Nagoya, Aichi
- Coordinates: 35°8′59″N 136°56′46.03″E
- Type: Musical instrument museum
- Website: http://www5d.biglobe.ne.jp/~mandolin/

Mandolin Melodies Museum (Japanese: マンドリンのおとのはくぶつかん) is a private museum in Nagoya. It is the only museum that specializes specifically in mandolins in the world.

== History ==
Mandolin Melodies Museum was founded by mandolin player Hirokazu Nanya in a renovated pharmacy. The museum opened on May 8, 1995. It features Nanya's collection of mandolin LP and EP records, CD's, and 20 mandolins, dating from the 1920s to present. Notable holdings include mandolins owned by Gaetano Vinaccia, an Italian luthier, and Masakichi Suzuki, the first person in Japan to build a mandolin.

The records and CD's exhibited at the museum can be listened to for a fee.

== Bibliography ==
- 中日新聞本社社会部 (1998-11-09). ぶらり名古屋 歩楽八十八景 (in Japanese). 中日新聞本社.
