= Mauro Squillante =

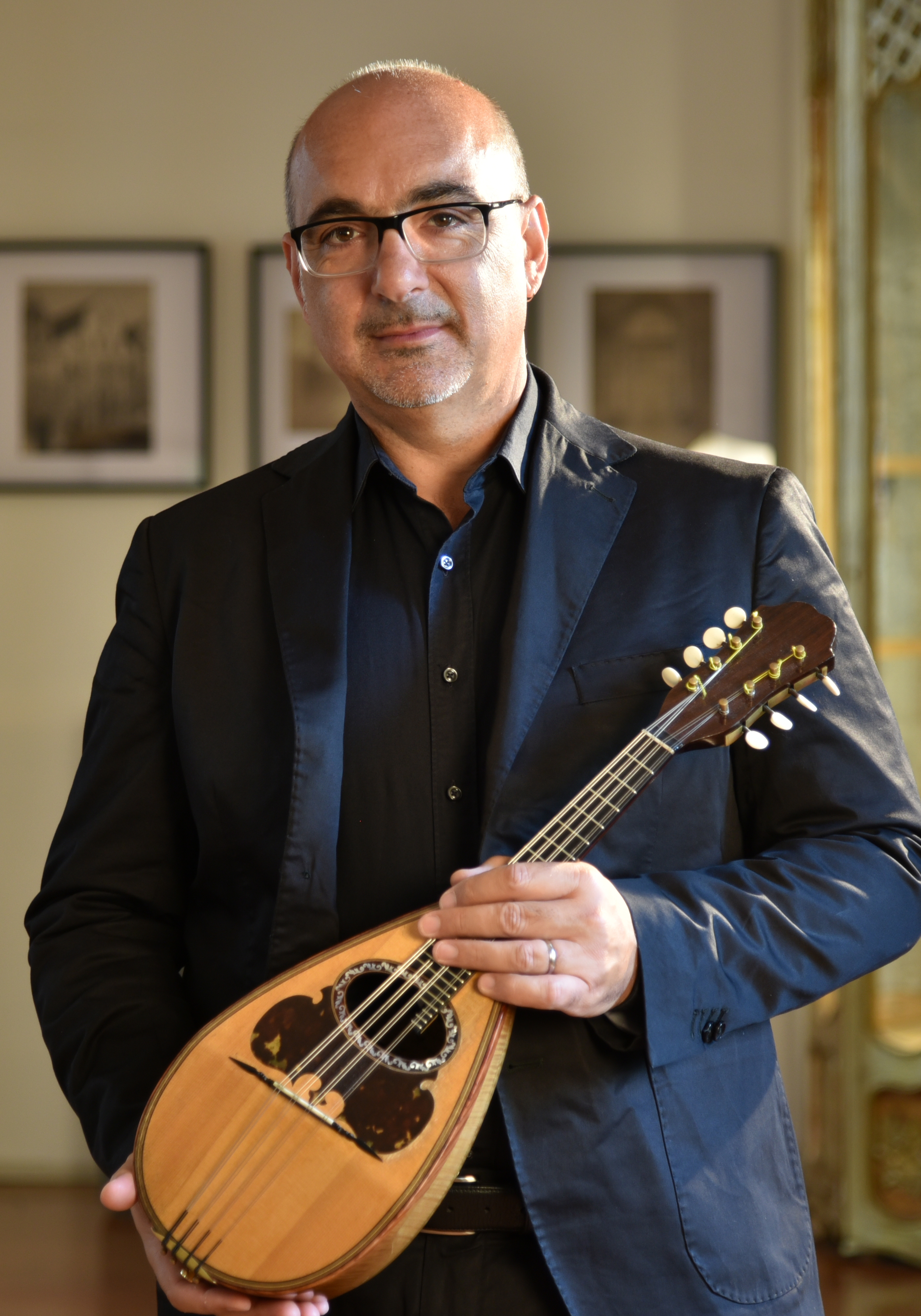
Mauro Squillante at a concert in the Royal Palace of Naples.

Mauro Squillante is a plucked-instruments researcher, a mandolinist and president of the Accademia Mandolinistica Napoletana (Neapolitan Mandolin Academy) in Naples, Italy, teaching classical-music mandolin. He also teaches at the Conservatory "Piccinni" of Bari and the "Martucci" of Salerno. He is important in the movement to revive the Neapolitan mandolin in its native city, where the instrument went out of style and its history became hard to access. His specialty is "ancient plucked string instruments" including the mandolin, mandola, mandolone, colascione and zither.

As part of rebuilding the presence of the Neapolitan mandolin in Naples, he and the Neapolitan Mandolin Academy take part in the Mandolin House, a performance venue but also a place for international students to take classes. The house works as a place where tourists can be exposed to the mandolin. The academy is recognized as having contributed to the revival of the mandolin in Naples.

Squillante is a graduate of the Pollini Conservatory of Padua and did further studying under with Hopkinson Smith and Crawford Young (at the Schola Cantorum Basiliensis), Enrico Baiano, Federico Marincola, Emilia Fadini and Edoardo Egüez.
