= Pietro Denis =

Italian composer

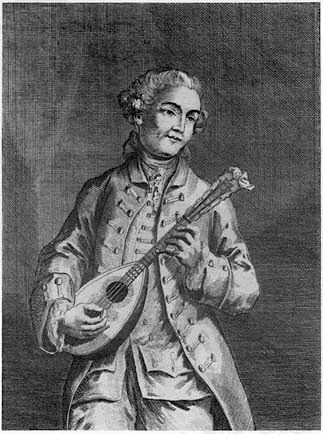
Portrait of Pietro Denis, 1768, taken from the cover of his book Méthode pour apprendre à jouer de la mandoline sans Maître (method to learn how to play mandolin without a teacher).

Pietro Denis (1720–1790), also known as Pierre Denis, was a French mandolin virtuoso and teacher, and composer. He studied under Giuliano in Naples and established himself in Paris. He is best known for his compositions Sonata for Mandolin & Continuo No. 1 in D major and Sonata No. 3 for Mandolin. He also wrote a mandolin instruction method, Méthode pour apprendre à jouer de la mandoline sans Maître (method to learn how to play mandolin without a teacher), published Paris in 1768.

He wrote another mandolin method, published in Paris in 1792, and was the author also of Four collections of airs for the mandolin; a New system of practical music, issued in Paris in 1747. Denis also wrote a French translation of Tartini's Tratto delle appogiature si asceudenti che discendeiiti per il violino, under the title of Traite des agremens de la musique, compose par le celebre Giuzeppe Tartini a Padua, et traduit par le Sigr. P.Denis. This volume was published by M. de la Chevardier, Paris.

In his final years, in 1780, he was a music master in a ladies' seminary in Saint Cyr.

== Other works ==
- Variations on La follia
- "A vous dirai-je maman" for two mandolins
- Variations on Air de Lison for two mandolins
- Prelude for solo "discordant" mandolin
- Variations for solo mandolin
- Kleine Stücke und Variationen : für zwei Mandolinen oder Mandoline und Mandola (Small pieces and variations: for two mandolins and mandolin and mandola)

=== Books ===
- Traité de composition musicale
- Treaty pleasures of music, containing the origin of the small note, its value, the manner of the place, all the different species of cadences, the way to use them, trembling and biting, use, that we can do, or charms natural modes, the modes artifficiels going to infinity, lan way to form a climax...
