= Salvator Léonardi =

Italian composer

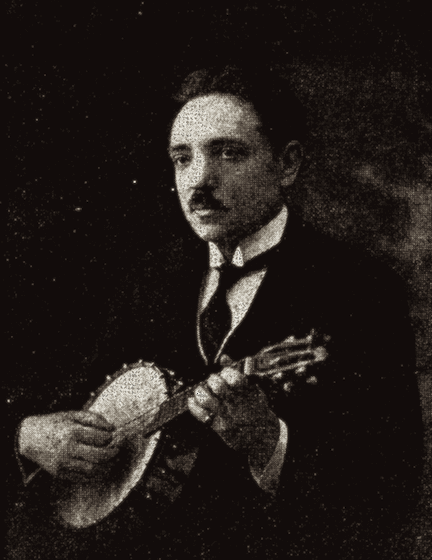
Salvator Léonardi

Salvator Léonardi (2 July 1872, Catania – 23 February 1938, Paris) was a mandolin virtuoso, teacher and composer. He taught in Egypt, Malta, London and Paris for more than 20 years, and also toured as a performer. Léonardi learned mandolin and guitar from an uncle, but went on to become a professional musician, studying the violin at a Naples conservatory. He won awards as a solo mandolinist at international music competitions in Florence and Rome.

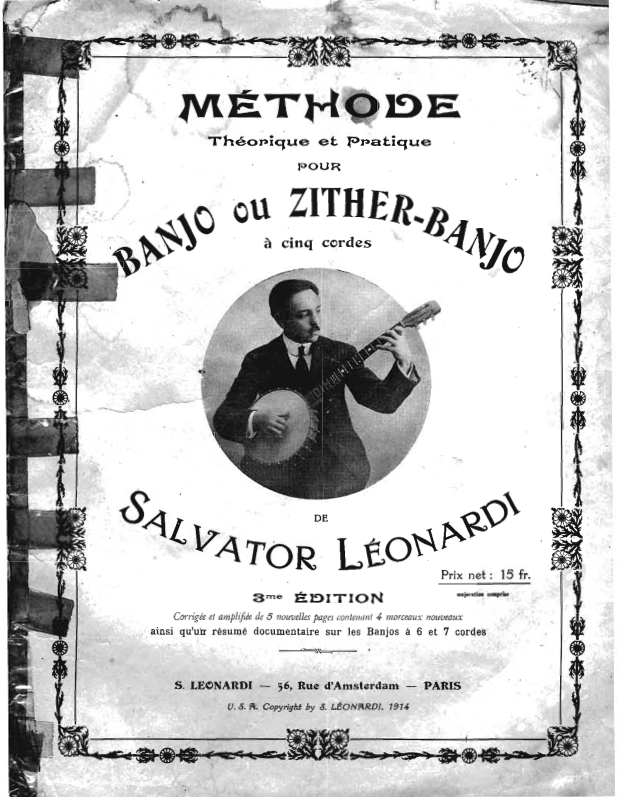
1914 Banjo instruction book, Methode Theorique pour Banjo ou Zither-Banjo by Salvator Leonardi

Léonardi was the author of the Méthode pour Banjoline ou Mandoline-Banjo (Method for Banjolin and Mandolin-Banjo). The book was rare among texts teaching mandolin, because it taught his method in three languages at once, English, French and Spanish. In the third edition of his mandolin-banjo method (1921), he stated in the introduction that the mandolin had been declining in popularity from previous times. In writing his book, he noted the instrument was soaring in popularity in the shape of the banjo. He did not just recycle old material for his book, but also included his own compositions, including Souvenir de Malta, Caminando (a tango), Souvenir de Rome, Un Beso Por Teléfono, Qui-Pro-Quo, Rêverie, and Capriccio (a polka).

As a music teacher, Léonardi was unsure of whether to include jazz in his book, saying he thought it was a faddish style of playing that might not be around very long. In spite of his speculation, he chose to include the section on how to play jazz, noting that he had played with American jazz bands after World War I.

He is known for composing Souvenir de Catania, Souvenir de Napoli, Souvenir de Sicile, and Angeli e Demoni.

== Compositions ==
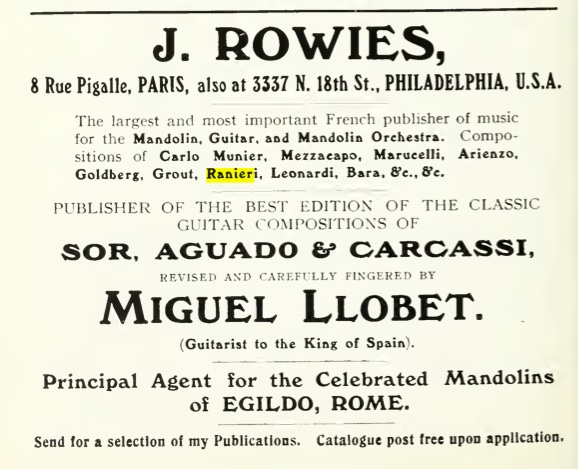
Advertisement for music publisher J. Rowies (Philadelphia, Pennsylvania) for mandolin sheet music. Taken from the book The guitar and mandolin, Biographies of celebrated players and composers for these instruments by Philip J. Bone, published by Schott and Company, London, 1914.

- Souvenir de Sicile
- Souvenir de Naples
- La bella sorrentina for mandolin with guitar or piano
- Angeli e demoni for mandolin
- Valse Fantastique
- Caprice Italien (waltz)
- La Mystérieuse Valse (waltz)

== See also ==
- List of mandolinists (sorted)
