= Mandolin =

Musical instrument in the lute family

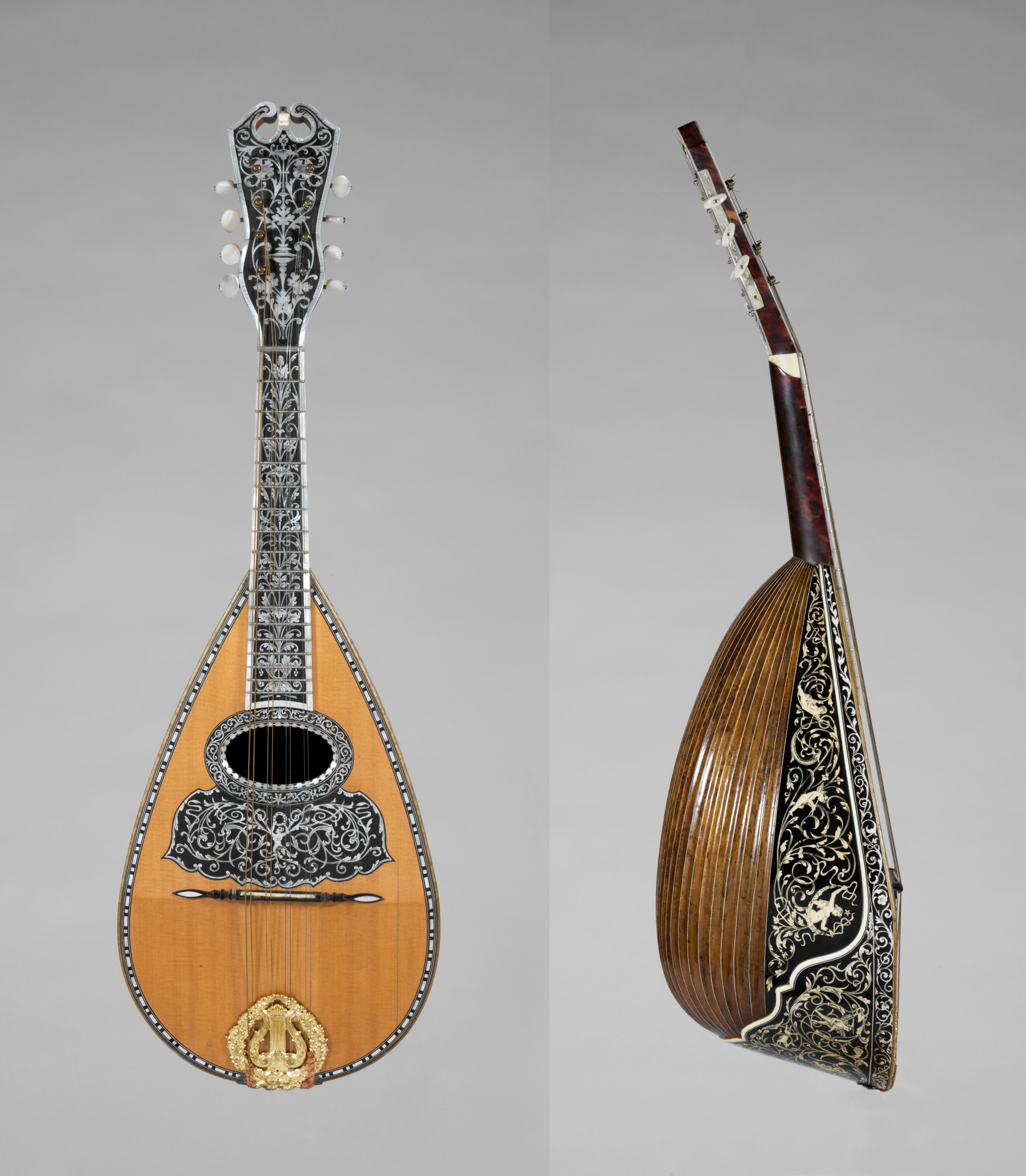
- Neapolitan mandolin

String instrument
- Classification: String instrument; Plucked string instrument
- Hornbostel–Sachs classification: 321.321-6 (Neapolitan) or 321.322-6 (flat-backed) (Chordophone with permanently attached resonator and neck, sounded by a plectrum)
- Developed: Mid-18th century from the mandolino
- Timbre: varies with the type: spruce carved-top, bright; flatback, warm or mellow
- Decay: fast

Playing range
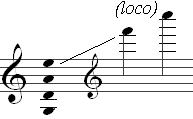
- (a regularly tuned mandolin with 14 frets to body)

Related instruments
- List: Modern Family; Mandolin; Mandola; Octave mandolin; Mandocello; Mandobass; Ancestral instruments; Gittern; Mandore; Related; Bandurria; Angélique; Archlute; Balalaika; Bouzouki; Chitarra italiana; Domra; Irish bouzouki; Lute; Mandriola; Mandole; Oud; Pandura; Tambura

Sound sample
- Oh Little Town of Bethlehem played on mandolins. A public domain recording.

A mandolin (Italian: mandolino, pronounced [mandoˈliːno]; literally "small mandola") is a stringed musical instrument in the lute family and is generally plucked with a pick. It most commonly has four courses of doubled strings tuned in unison, thus giving a total of eight strings. A variety of string types are used, with steel strings being the most common and usually the least expensive. The courses are typically tuned in an interval of perfect fifths, with the same tuning as a violin (G3, D4, A4, E5). Also, like the violin, it is the soprano member of a family that includes the mandola, octave mandolin, mandocello and mandobass.

There are many styles of mandolin, but the three most common types are the Neapolitan or round-backed mandolin, the archtop mandolin and the flat-backed mandolin. The round-backed version has a deep bottom, constructed of strips of wood, glued together into a bowl. The archtop, also known as the carved-top mandolin, has an arched top and a shallower, arched back both carved out of wood. The flat-backed mandolin uses thin sheets of wood for the body, braced on the inside for strength in a similar manner to a guitar. Each style of instrument has its own sound quality and is associated with particular styles of music. Neapolitan mandolins feature prominently in European classical music and in traditional music like the Andean music of Peru. Archtop instruments are common in American folk music, old-time music, and bluegrass music. Flat-backed instruments are commonly used in Irish, British, and Brazilian folk music, and Mexican estudiantinas.

Other mandolin variations differ primarily in the number of strings and include four-string models (tuned in fifths) such as the Brescian and Cremonese; six-string types (tuned in fourths) such as the Milanese, Lombard, and Sicilian; six-course instruments of 12 strings (two strings per course) such as the Genoese; and the tricordia, with four triple-string courses (12 strings total).

Design changes in the history of the mandolin have often involved the soundboard (the top). Early instruments were quiet, strung with gut strings, and plucked with the fingers or with a quill. Modern instruments are louder, using metal strings, which exert more pressure than the gut strings. The modern soundboard is designed to withstand the pressure of metal strings that would break earlier instruments. The soundboard comes in many shapes—but generally round or teardrop-shaped, sometimes with scrolls or other projections. It usually has one or more sound holes in it, which may be round, oval, or shaped like a calligraphic f (f-hole). A round or oval sound hole may be covered with a decorative rosette or bordered with purfling.

== History ==
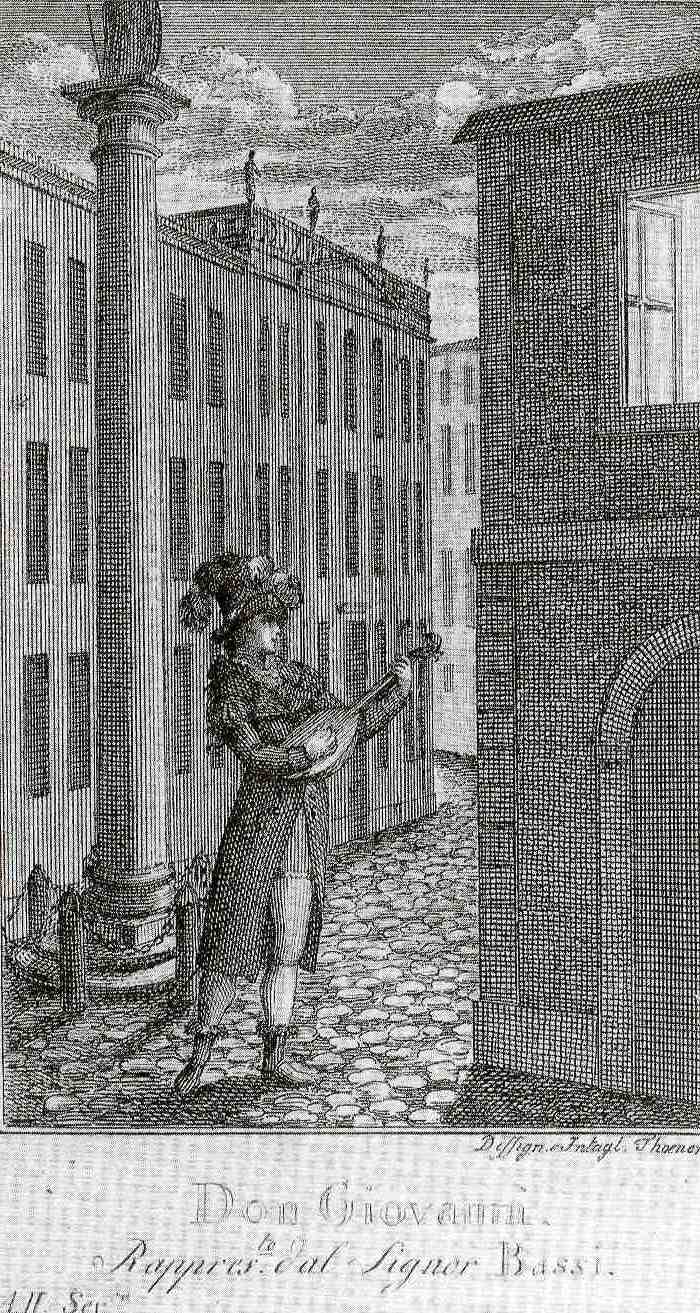
In 1787, Luigi Bassi played the role of Don Giovanni in Mozart's opera, serenading a woman with a mandolin. This used to be the common picture of the mandolin, an obscure instrument of romance in the hands of a Spanish nobleman

Mandolins evolved from lutes, a family of instruments in Europe. Predecessors include the gittern and mandore or mandola in Italy during the 17th and 18th centuries. There were a variety of regional variants, but the two most widespread ones were the Neapolitan mandolin and the Lombard mandolin. The Neapolitan style has spread worldwide.

== Construction ==
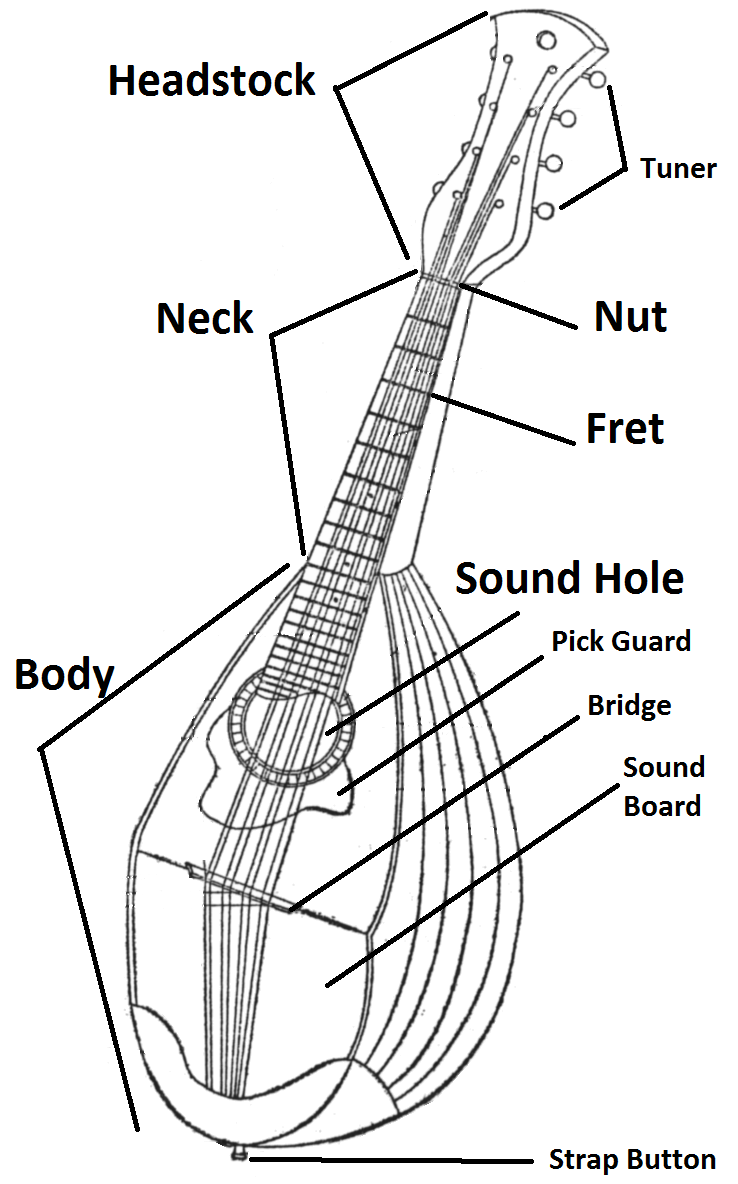
Anatomy of a bowlback mandolin in schematic drawing

Mandolins have a body that acts as a resonator, attached to a neck. The resonating body may be shaped as a bowl (necked bowl lutes) or a box (necked box lutes). Traditional Italian mandolins, such as the Neapolitan mandolin, meet the necked bowl description. The necked box instruments include archtop mandolins and the flatback mandolins.

Strings run between mechanical tuning machines at the top of the neck to a tailpiece that anchors the other end of the strings. The strings are suspended over the neck and soundboard and pass over a floating bridge. The bridge is kept in contact with the soundboard by the downward pressure from the strings. The neck is either flat or has a slight radius, and is covered with a fingerboard with frets. The action of the strings on the bridge causes the soundboard to vibrate, producing sound.

Like any plucked instrument, mandolin notes decay to silence rather than sound out continuously as with a bowed note on a violin, and mandolin notes decay faster than larger chordophones like the guitar. This encourages the use of tremolo (rapid picking of one or more pairs of strings) to create sustained notes or chords. The mandolin's paired strings facilitate this technique: the plectrum (pick) strikes each of a pair of strings alternately, providing a more full and continuous sound than a single string would.

Various design variations and amplification techniques have been used to make mandolins comparable in volume with louder instruments and orchestras, including the creation of mandolin-banjo hybrids with the drum-like body of the louder banjo, adding metal resonators (most notably by Dobro and the National String Instrument Corporation) to make a resonator mandolin, and amplifying electric mandolins through amplifiers.

== Tuning ==
A variety of different tunings are used. Usually, courses of 2 adjacent strings are tuned in unison. By far the most common tuning is the same as violin tuning, in scientific pitch notation G_{3}–D_{4}–A_{4}–E_{5}, or in Helmholtz pitch notation: g–d′–a′–e″.

- fourth (lowest tone) course: G_{3} (196.00 Hz)
- third course: D_{4} (293.66 Hz)
- second course: A_{4} (440.00 Hz; A above middle C)
- first (highest tone) course: E_{5} (659.25 Hz)

The numbers of Hz shown above assume a 440 Hz A, standard in most parts of the western world. Some players use an A up to 10 Hz above or below a 440, mainly outside the United States.

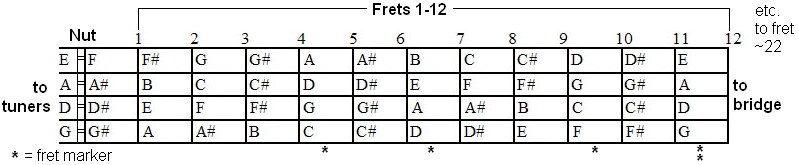

Other tunings exist, including cross-tunings, in which the usually doubled string runs are tuned to different pitches. Additionally, guitarists may sometimes tune a mandolin to mimic a portion of the intervals on a standard guitar tuning to achieve familiar fretting patterns.

== Mandolin family ==
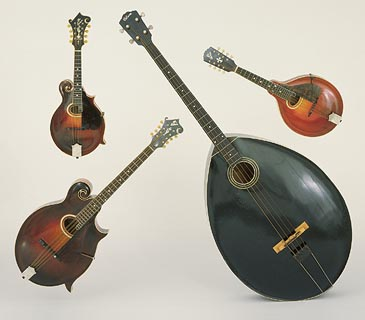
Clockwise from top left: 1920 Gibson F-4 mandolin; 1917 Gibson H-2 mandola; 1929 Gibson mando-bass; and 1924 Gibson K-4 mandocello from Gregg Miner's collection

=== Soprano ===
The mandolin is the soprano member of the mandolin family, as the violin is the soprano member of the violin family. Like the violin, its scale length is typically about 13 inches (330 mm). Modern American mandolins modelled after Gibsons have a longer scale, about 13 7/8 inches (350 mm). The strings in each of its double-strung courses are tuned in unison, and the courses use the same tuning as the violin: G_{3}–D_{4}–A_{4}–E_{5}.

=== Piccolo ===
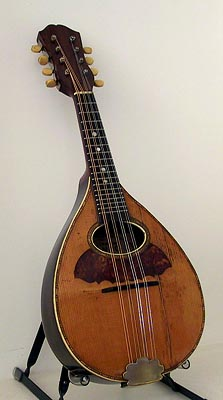
Piccolo mandolin

The piccolo or sopranino mandolin is a rare member of the family, tuned one octave above the mandola and one fourth above the mandolin (C_{4}–G_{4}–D_{5}–A_{5}); the same relation as that of the piccolo (to the western concert flute) or violino piccolo (to the violin and viola). One model was manufactured by the Lyon & Healy company under the Leland brand. A handful of modern instruments makers build piccolo mandolins.

=== Alto ===
The mandola, termed the tenor mandola in Britain and Ireland and liola or alto mandolin in continental Europe, is tuned a fifth below the mandolin, in the same relationship as that of the viola to the violin. Some also call this instrument the "alto mandola". Its scale length is typically about 16 1/2 inches (420 mm). It is normally tuned like a viola (perfect fifth below the mandolin) and tenor banjo: C_{3}–G_{3}–D_{4}–A_{4}.

=== Tenor ===
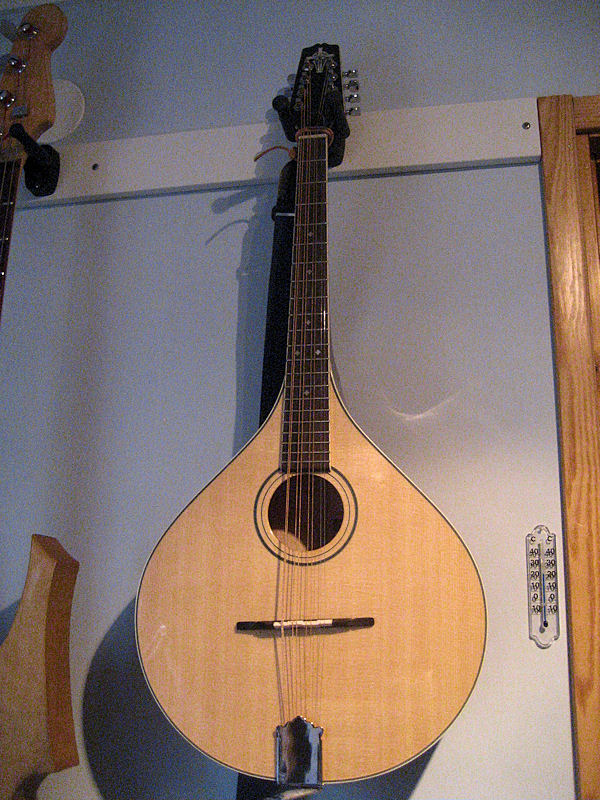
A flatback octave mandolin

The octave mandolin (US and Canada), termed the octave mandola in Britain and Ireland and mandola in continental Europe, is tuned an octave below the mandolin: G_{2}–D_{3}–A_{3}–E_{4}. Its relationship to the mandolin is that of the tenor violin to the violin, or the tenor saxophone to the soprano saxophone. Octave mandolin scale length is typically about 20 inches (510 mm), although instruments with scales as short as 17 inches (430 mm) or as long as 21 inches (530 mm) are not unknown.

The instrument has a variant off the coast of South America in Trinidad, where it is known as the bandol, a flat-backed instrument with four courses, the lower two strung with metal and nylon strings.

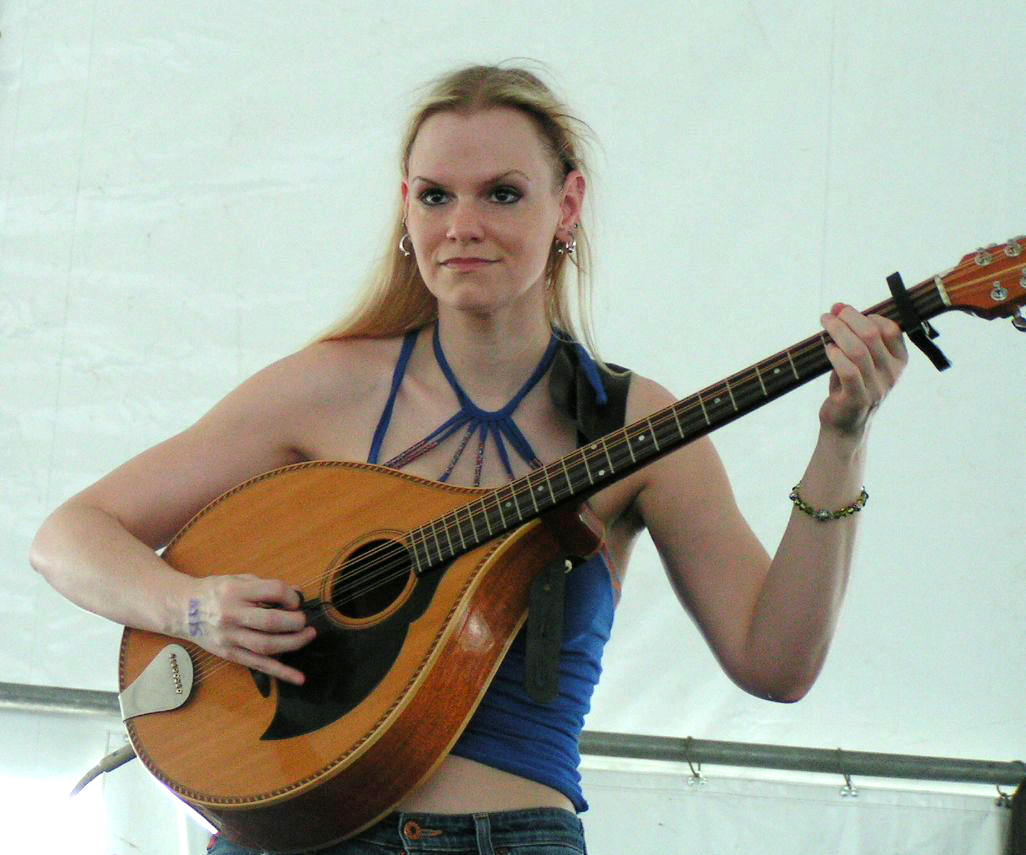
Irish bouzouki played by Beth Patterson at Dublin, Ohio's Irish Fest

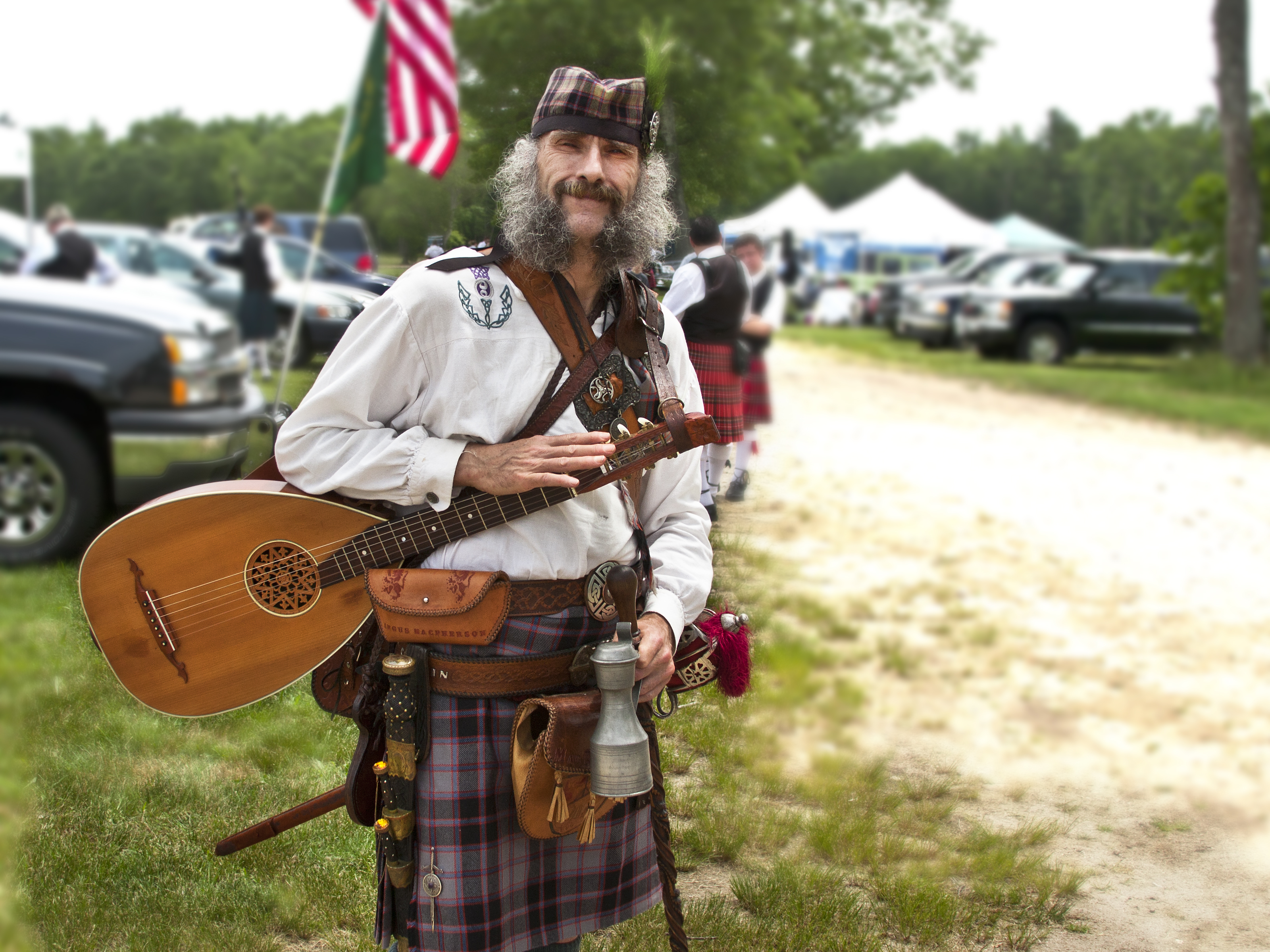
Musician with cittern, RI Scottish Highland Festival, June 2012

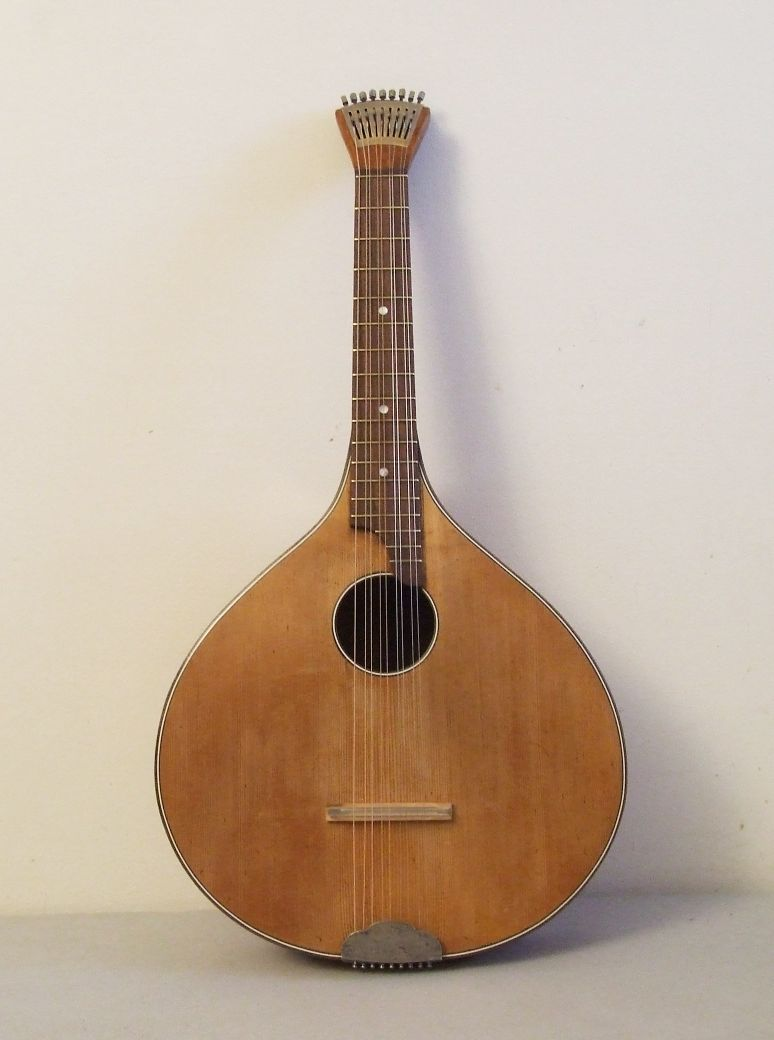
A waldzither

The Irish bouzouki, though not strictly a member of the mandolin family, has a reasonable resemblance and similar range to the octave mandolin. It derives from the Greek bouzouki (a long-necked lute), constructed like a flat-backed mandolin and uses fifth-based tunings, most often G_{2}–D_{3}–A_{3}–D_{4}. Other tunings include: A_{2}–D_{3}–A_{3}–D_{4}, G_{2}–D_{3}–A_{3}–E_{4} (an octave below the mandolin—in which case it essentially functions as an octave mandolin), G_{2}–D_{3}–G_{3}–D_{4} or A_{2}–D_{3}–A_{3}–E_{4}. Although the Irish bouzouki's bass course pairs are most often tuned in unison, on some instruments one of each pair is replaced with a lighter string and tuned in octaves, similar to the 12-string guitar. While occupying the same range as the octave mandolin/octave mandola, the Irish bouzouki is theoretically distinguished from the former instrument by its longer scale length, typically from 24 to 26 inches (610 to 660 mm), although scales as long as 27 inches (690 mm), which is the usual Greek bouzouki scale, are not unknown. In modern usage, however, the terms "octave mandolin" and "Irish bouzouki" are often used interchangeably to refer to the same instrument.

The modern cittern may also be loosely included in an "extended" mandolin family, based on resemblance to the flat-backed mandolins, which it predates. Its own lineage dates it back to the Renaissance. It is typically a five course (ten-string) instrument having a scale length between 20 and 22 inches (510 and 560 mm). The instrument is most often tuned to either D_{2}–G_{2}–D_{3}–A_{3}–D_{4} or G_{2}–D_{3}–A_{3}–D_{4}–A_{4}, and is essentially an octave mandola with a fifth course at either the top or the bottom of its range. Some luthiers, such as Stefan Sobell, also refer to the octave mandola or a shorter-scaled Irish bouzouki as a cittern, irrespective of whether it has four or five courses.

Other relatives of the cittern, which might also be loosely linked to the mandolins (and are sometimes tuned and played as such), include the 6-course/12-string Portuguese guitar and the 5-course/9-string waldzither.

=== Baritone/Bass ===
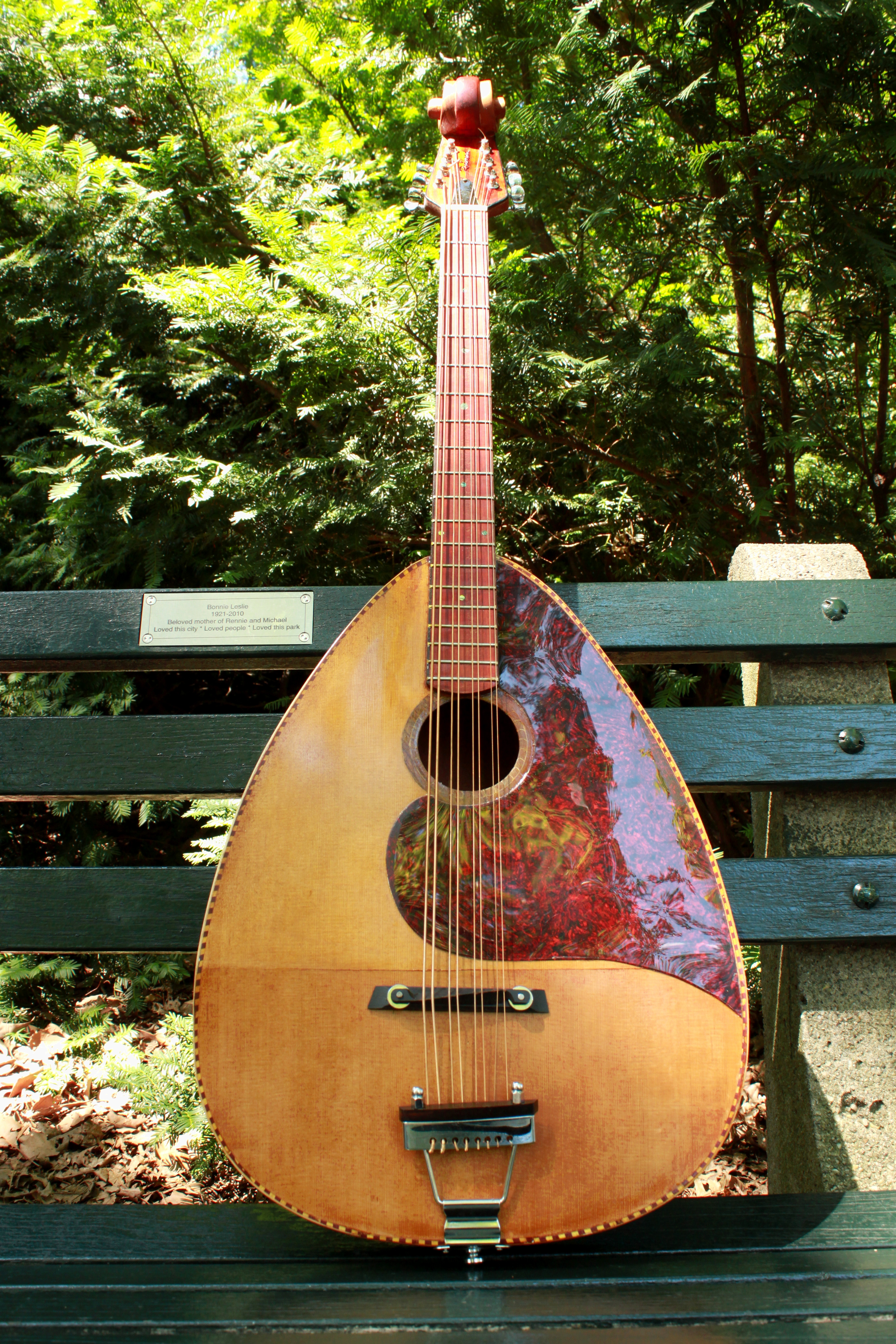
Neapolitan styled mandocello built to 26 3/8-inch (670 mm) scale

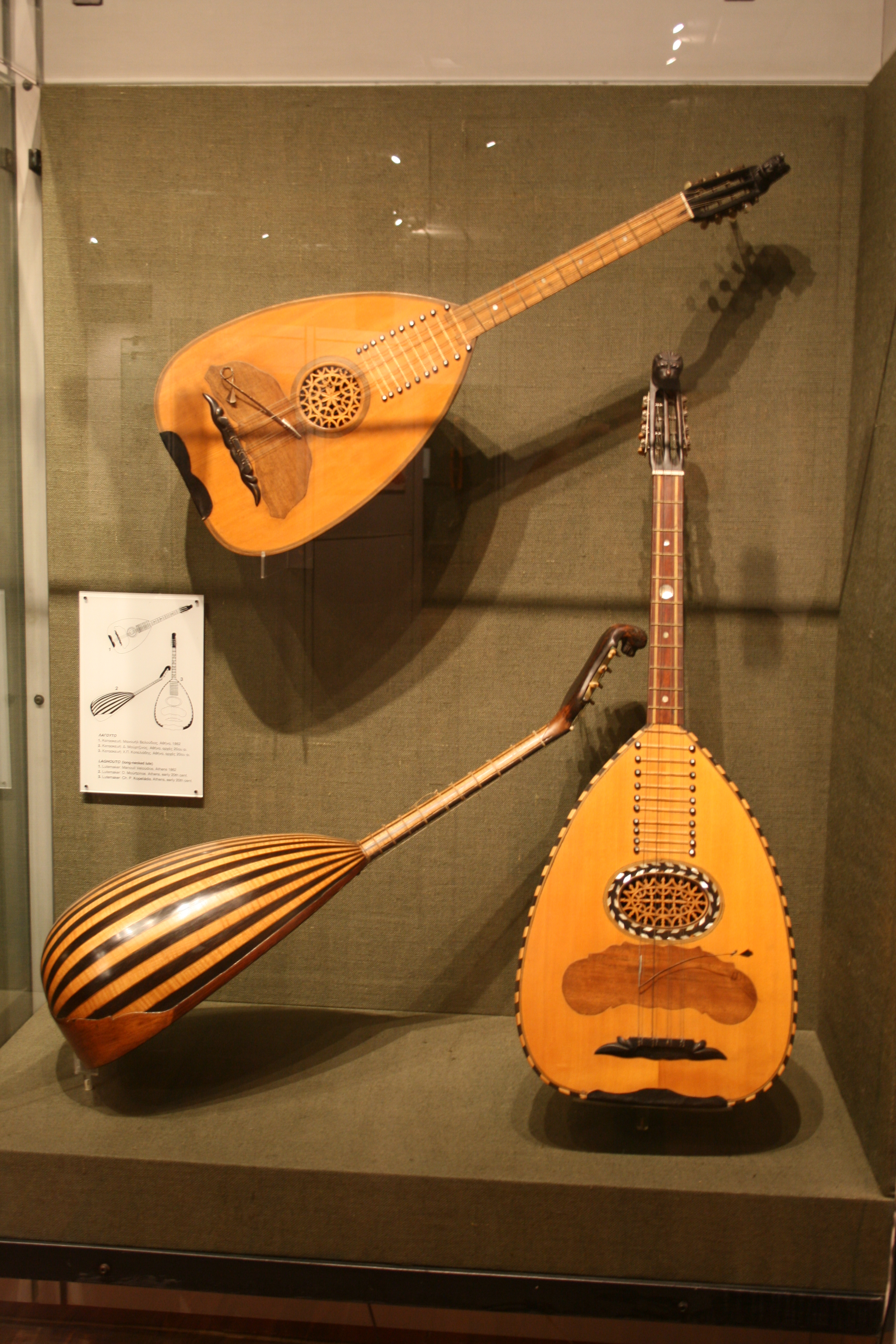
19th- and 20th-century laouta

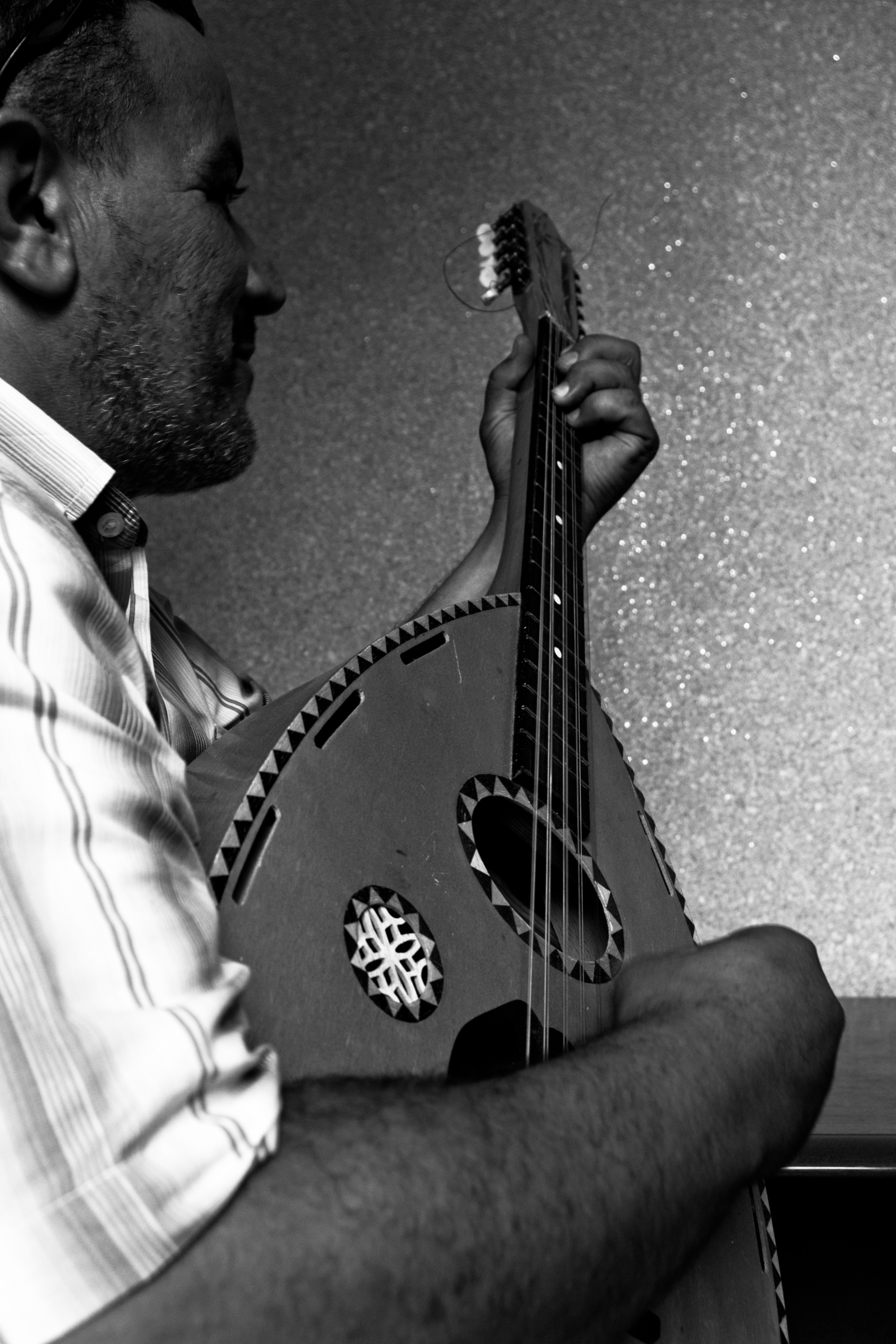
Algerian mandole (flatback) from the side

The mandocello is classically tuned to an octave plus a fifth below the mandolin, in the same relationship as that of the cello to the violin, its strings being tuned to C_{2}–G_{2}–D_{3}–A_{3}. Its scale length is typically about 26 inches (660 mm). A typical violoncello scale is 27 inches (690 mm).

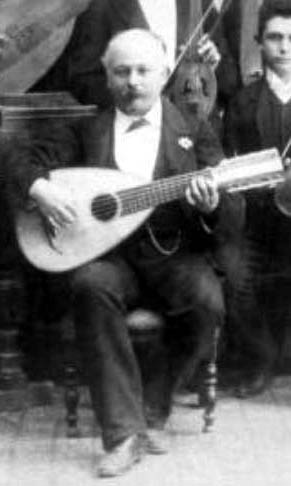
A mandolone played by Giuseppe Branzoli during a concert in Rome, 1889

The mandolone was a Baroque member of the mandolin family in the bass range that was surpassed by the mandocello. It was part of the Neapolitan mandolin family.

The Greek laouto or laghouto (long-necked lute) is similar to a mandocello, ordinarily tuned C_{3}/C_{2}–G_{3}/G_{2}–D_{3}/D_{3}–A_{3}/A_{3} with half of each pair of the lower two courses being tuned an octave high on a lighter gauge string. The body is a staved bowl, the saddle-less bridge glued to the flat face like most ouds and lutes, with mechanical tuners, steel strings, and tied gut frets. Modern laoutos, as played on Crete, have the entire lower course tuned to C_{3}, a reentrant octave above the expected low C. Its scale length is typically about 28 inches (710 mm).

The Algerian mandole was developed by an Italian luthier in the early 1930s, scaled up from a mandola until it reached a scale length of approximately 25 to 27 inches. It is a flatback instrument, with a wide neck and 4 courses (8 strings), 5 courses (10 strings) or 6 courses (12 strings), and is used in Algeria and Morocco. The instrument can be tuned as a guitar, oud, or mandocello, depending on the music it will be used to play and player preference. When tuning it as a guitar the strings will be tuned (E_{2}) (E_{2}) A_{2} A_{2} D_{3} D_{3} G_{3} G_{3} B_{3} B_{3} (E_{4}) (E_{4}); strings in parentheses are dropped for a five- or four-course instrument. Using a common Arabic oud tuning D_{2} D_{2} G_{2} G_{2} A_{2} A_{2} D_{3} D_{3} (G_{3}) (G_{3}) (C_{4}) (C_{4}). For a mandocello tuning using fifths C_{2} C_{2} G_{2} G_{2} D_{3} D_{3} A_{3} A_{3} (E_{4}) (E_{4}).

=== Mandobass ===
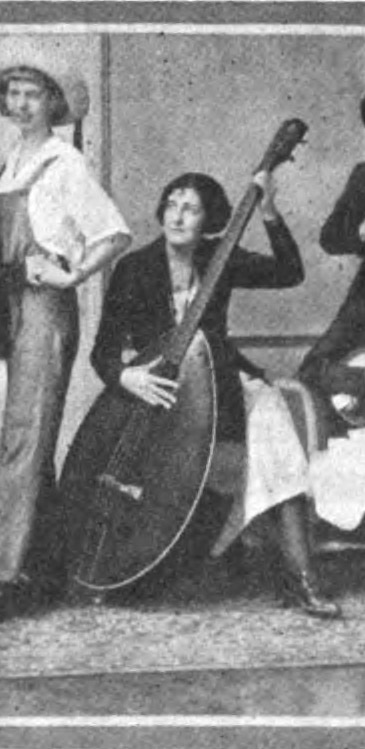
Gibson mando-bass from 1922 advertisement

The mandobass is the bass version of the mandolin, just as the double bass is the bass to the violin. Like the double bass, it most frequently has four single strings, rather than double courses—and like the double bass, it is most commonly tuned to perfect fourths rather than fifths like most mandolin family instruments: E_{1}–A_{1}–D_{2}–G_{2,}. These were made by the Gibson company in the early 20th century and were never very common. A smaller scale four-string mandobass, usually tuned in fifths: G_{1}–D_{2}–A_{2}–E_{3} (two octaves below the mandolin), though not as resonant as the larger instrument, was often preferred by players as easier to handle and more portable. Reportedly, however, most mandolin orchestras preferred to use the ordinary double bass, rather than a specialised mandolin family instrument. Calace and other Italian makers predating Gibson also made mandolin-basses.

The relatively rare eight-string mandobass, or "tremolo-bass", also exists, with double courses like the rest of the mandolin family, and is tuned either G_{1}–D_{2}–A_{2}–E_{3}, two octaves lower than the mandolin, or C_{1}–G_{1}–D_{2}–A_{2}, two octaves below the mandola.

== Variations ==
=== Bowlback ===
Bowlback mandolins (also known as roundbacks), are used worldwide. They are most commonly manufactured in Europe, where the long history of mandolin development has created local styles. However, Japanese luthiers also make them.

Owing to the shape and to the common construction from wood strips of alternating colors, in the United States these are sometimes colloquially referred to as the "potato bug", "potato beetle", or tater-bug mandolin.

==== Neapolitan and Roman styles ====
The Neapolitan style has an almond-shaped body resembling a bowl, constructed from curved strips of wood. It usually has a bent sound table, canted in two planes with the design to take the tension of the eight metal strings arranged in four courses. A hardwood fingerboard sits on top of or is flush with the sound table. Very old instruments may use wooden tuning pegs, while newer instruments tend to use geared metal tuners. The bridge is a movable length of hardwood. A pickguard is glued below the sound hole under the strings. European roundbacks commonly use a 13-inch (330 mm) scale instead of the 13 7/8 inches (350 mm) common on archtop Mandolins.

Intertwined with the Neapolitan style is the Roman style mandolin, which has influenced it. The Roman mandolin had a fingerboard that was more curved and narrow. The fingerboard was lengthened over the sound hole for the E strings, the high pitched strings. The shape of the back of the neck was different, less rounded with an edge, the bridge was curved making the G strings higher. The Roman mandolin had mechanical tuning gears before the Neapolitan.

===== Manufacturers of Neapolitan-style mandolins =====
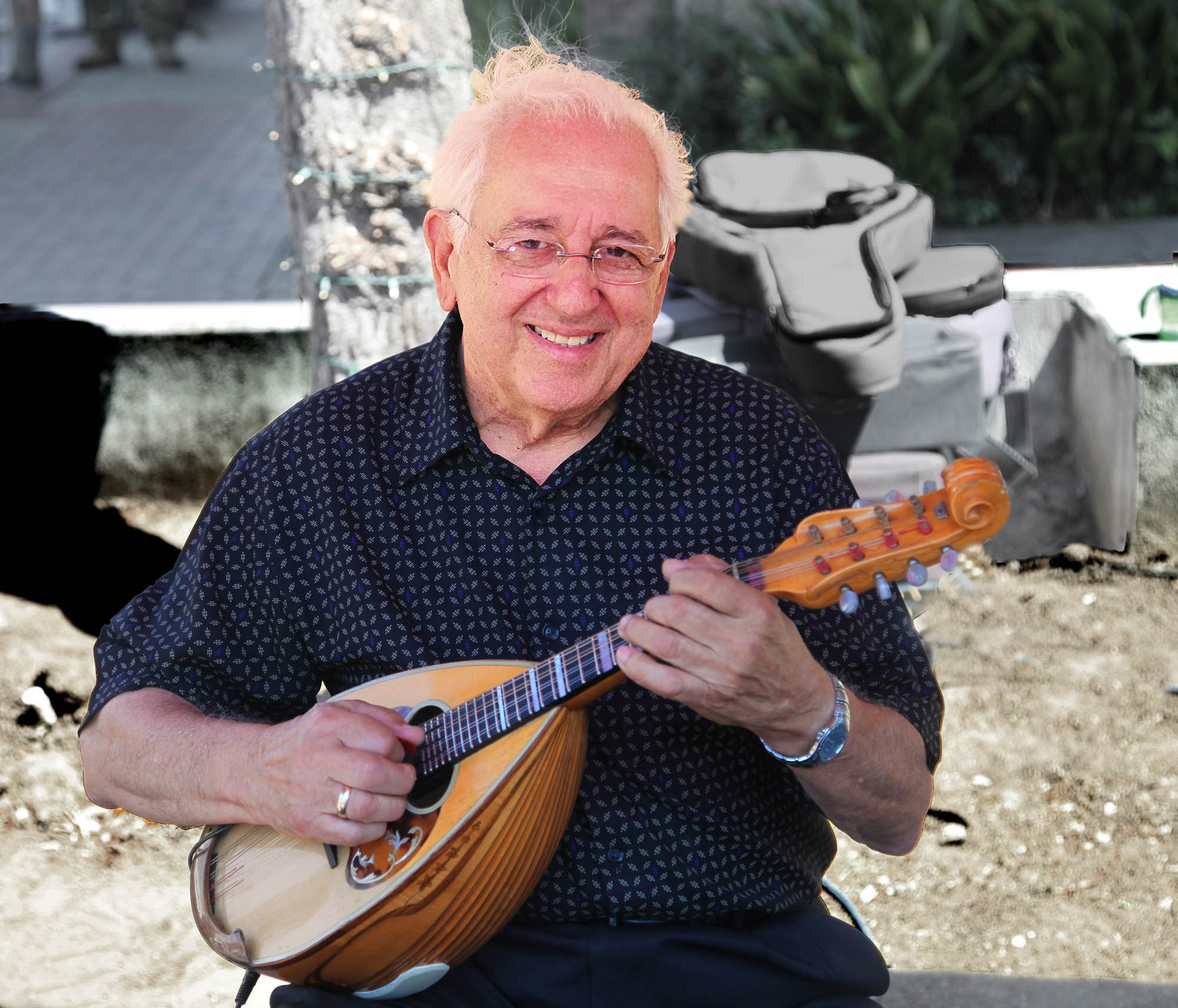
Modern bowlback mandolin manufactured by the Calace family workshop

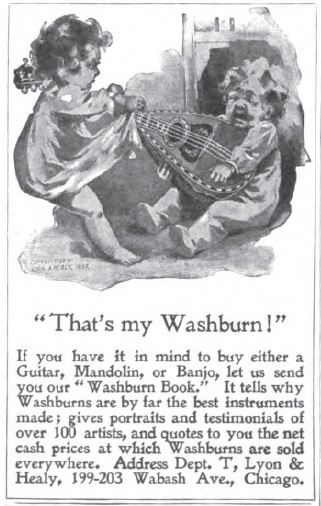
1897 Advertisement for a Lyon and Healy-made, Washburn brand mandolin

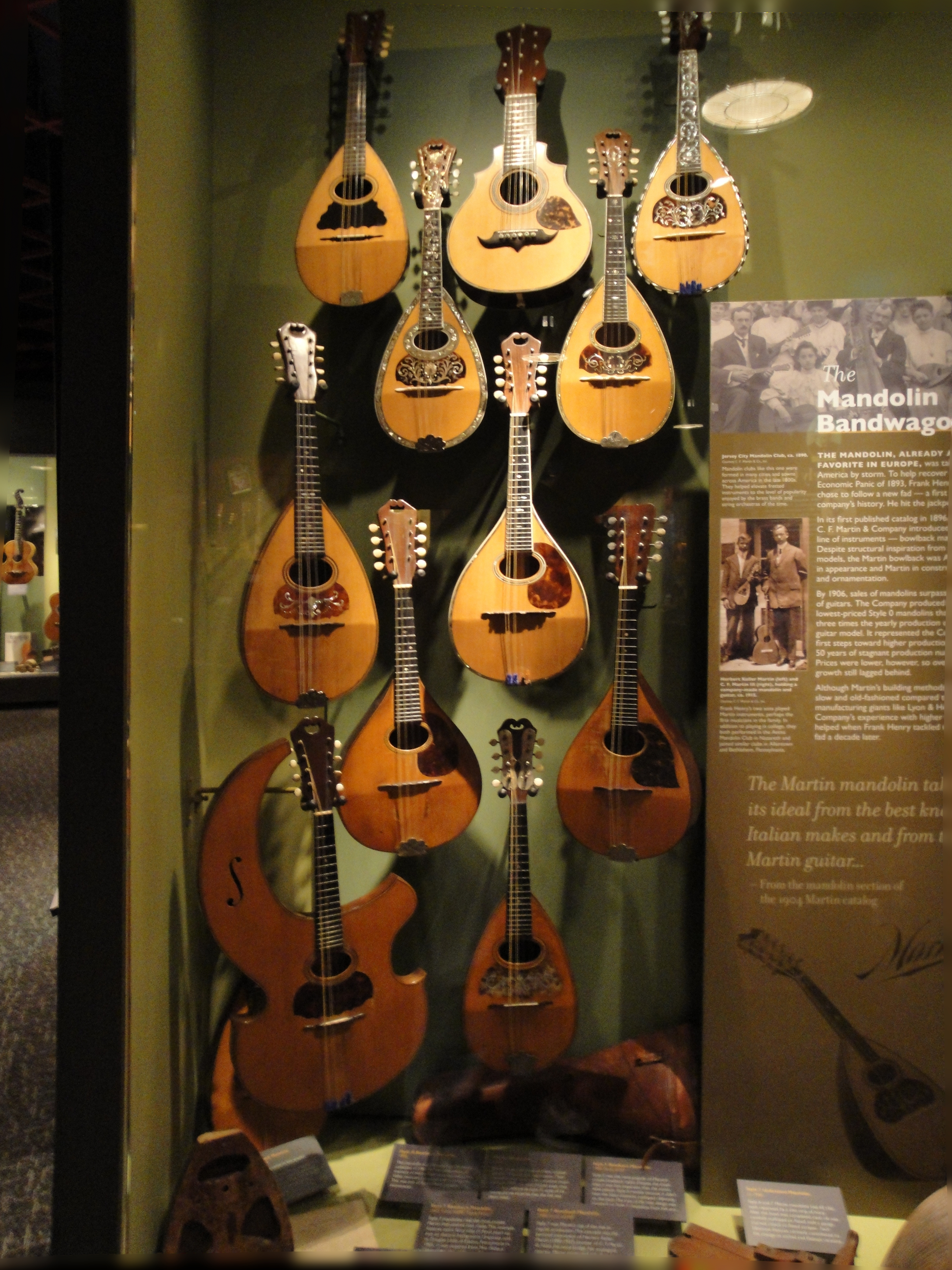
Martin mandolins and harp mandolin on display at the Martin Guitar Factory

Prominent Italian manufacturers include Vinaccia (Naples), Embergher (Rome) and Calace (Naples) who inspired a golden age of Neapolitan mandolin-making in the late 19th century and early 20th century. Other notable contemporaries of this period include Umberto Ceccherini, Giovanni de Meglio, Michele Maratea, and Giovanni Kasermann. Modern manufacturers include Lorenzo Lippi (Milan), Hendrik van den Broek (Netherlands), Brian Dean (Canada), Salvatore Masiello and Michele Caiazza (La Bottega del Mandolino) and Ferrara, Gabriele Pandini.

In the United States, when the bowlback was being made in numbers, Lyon and Healy was a major manufacturer, especially under the "Washburn" brand. Other American manufacturers include Martin, Vega, and Larson Brothers.

In Canada, Brian Dean has manufactured instruments in Neapolitan, Roman, German and American styles but is also known for his original 'Grand Concert' design created for American virtuoso Joseph Brent.

German manufacturers include Albert & Mueller, Dietrich, Klaus Knorr, Reinhold Seiffert and Alfred Woll. The German bowlbacks use a style developed by Seiffert, with a larger and rounder body.

Japanese brands include Kunishima and Suzuki. Other Japanese manufacturers include Oona, Kawada, Noguchi, Toichiro Ishikawa, Rokutaro Nakade, Otiai Tadao, Yoshihiko Takusari, Nokuti Makoto, Watanabe, Kanou Kadama and Ochiai.

==== Other bowlback styles ====
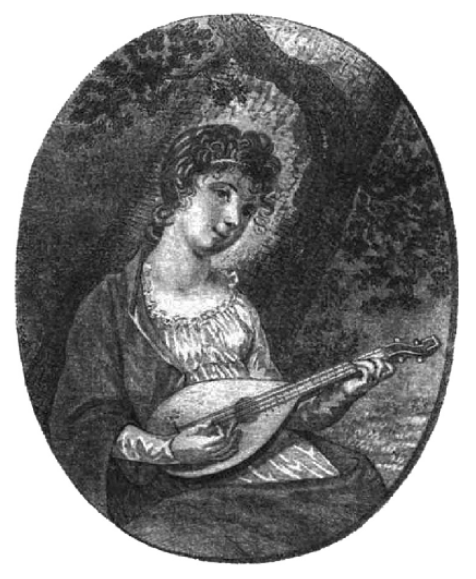
Cremonese mandolin with four strings, from an 1805 book by Bartolomeo Bortolazzi

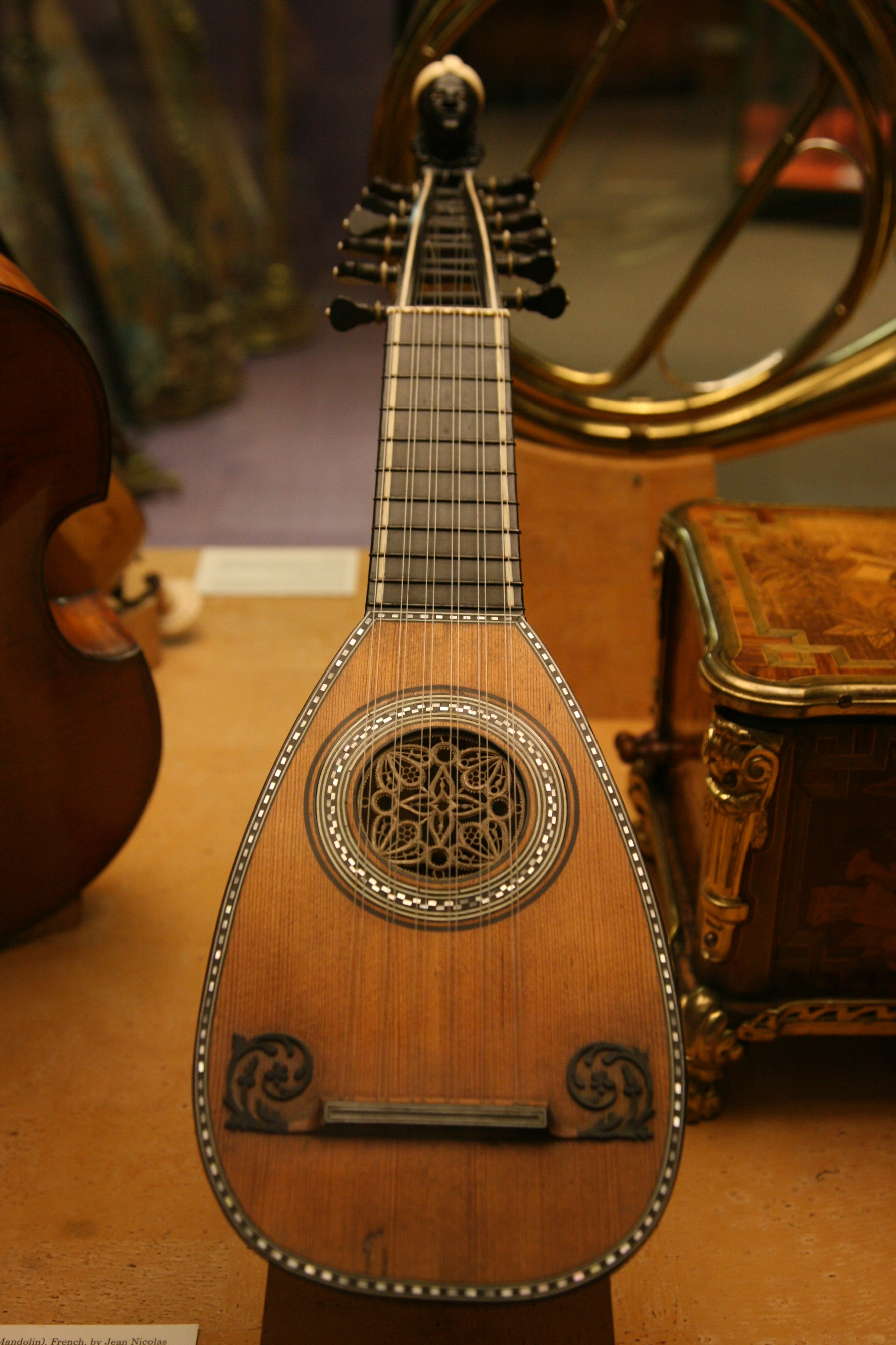
Lombard mandolin with twelve strings in six courses. The bridge is glued to the soundboard, like a guitar's bridge.

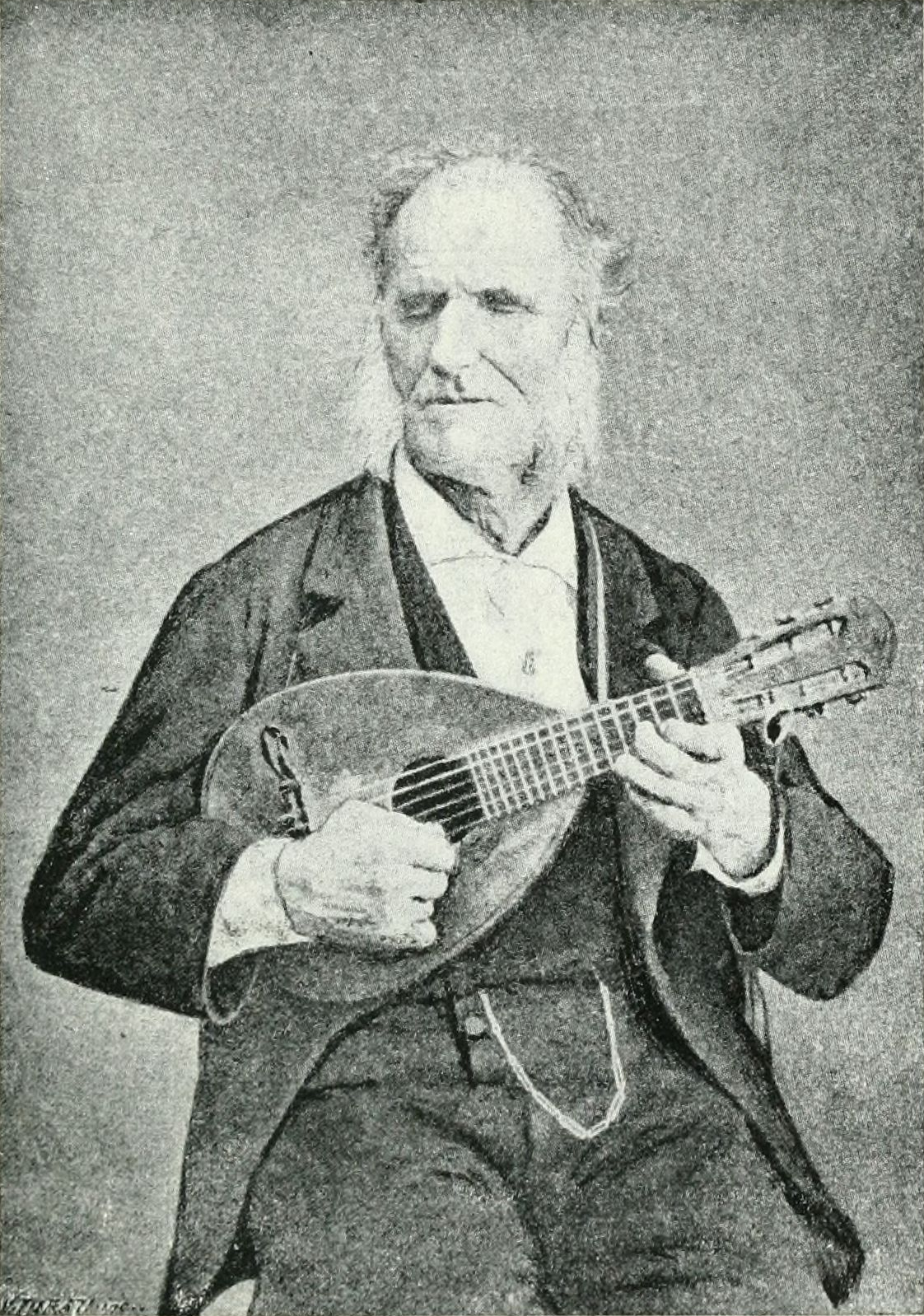
Giovanni Vailati, "Blind mandolinist of Cremona", toured Europe in the 1850s with a six-string Lombard mandolin.

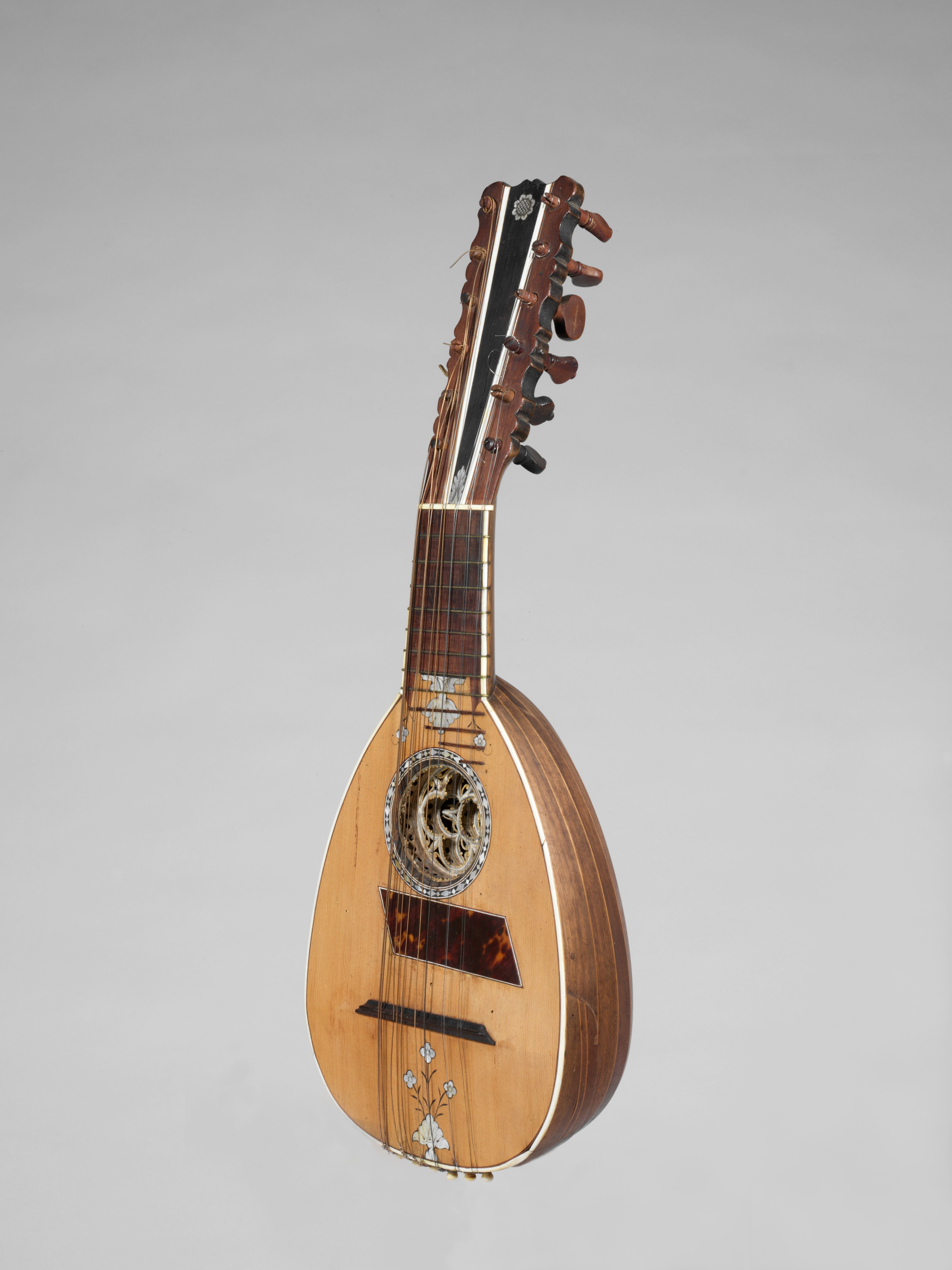
Genoese mandolin with twelve strings in six courses. The bridge is held to the soundboard by the strings.

Another family of bowlback mandolins came from Milan and Lombardy. These mandolins are closer to the mandolino or mandore than other modern mandolins. They are shorter and wider than the standard Neapolitan mandolin, with a shallow back. The instruments have 6 strings, 3 wire treble-strings and 3 gut or wire-wrapped-silk bass-strings. The strings ran between the tuning pegs and a bridge that was glued to the soundboard, as a guitar's. The Lombard mandolins were tuned g–b–e′–a′–d″–g″ (shown in Helmholtz pitch notation). A developer of the Milanese style was Antonio Monzino (Milan) and his family who made them for six generations.

Samuel Adelstein described the Lombard mandolin in 1893 as wider and shorter than the Neapolitan mandolin, with a shallower back and a shorter and wider neck, with six single strings to the regular mandolin's set of 4. The Lombard was tuned C–D–A–E–B–G. The strings were fastened to the bridge like a guitar's. There were 20 frets, covering three octaves, with an additional 5 notes. When Adelstein wrote, there were no nylon strings, and the gut and single strings "do not vibrate so clearly and sweetly as the double steel string of the Neapolitan."

===== Brescian mandolin or Cremonese mandolin =====
Brescian mandolins (also known as Cremonese) that have survived in museums have four gut strings instead of six and a fixed bridge. The mandolin was tuned in fifths, like the Neapolitan mandolin. In his 1805 mandolin method, Anweisung die Mandoline von selbst zu erlernen nebst einigen Uebungsstucken von Bortolazzi, Bartolomeo Bortolazzi popularised the Cremonese mandolin, which had four single-strings and a fixed bridge, to which the strings were attached. Bortolazzi said in this book that the new wire-strung mandolins were uncomfortable to play, when compared with the gut-string instruments. Also, he felt they had a "less pleasing...hard, zither-like tone" as compared to the gut string's "softer, full-singing tone." He favored the four single strings of the Cremonese instrument, which were tuned the same as the Neapolitan.

===== Genoese mandolin, a blend of styles =====
Like the Lombard mandolin, the Genoese mandolin was not tuned in fifths. Its 6 gut strings (or 6 courses of strings) were tuned as a guitar but one octave higher: e-a-d’-g’-b natural-e”. Like the Neapolitan and unlike the Lombard mandolin, the Genoese does not have the bridge glued to the soundboard, but holds the bridge on with downward tension, from strings that run between the bottom and neck of the instrument. The neck was wider than the Neapolitan mandolin's neck. The peg-head is similar to the guitar's.

=== Archtop ===
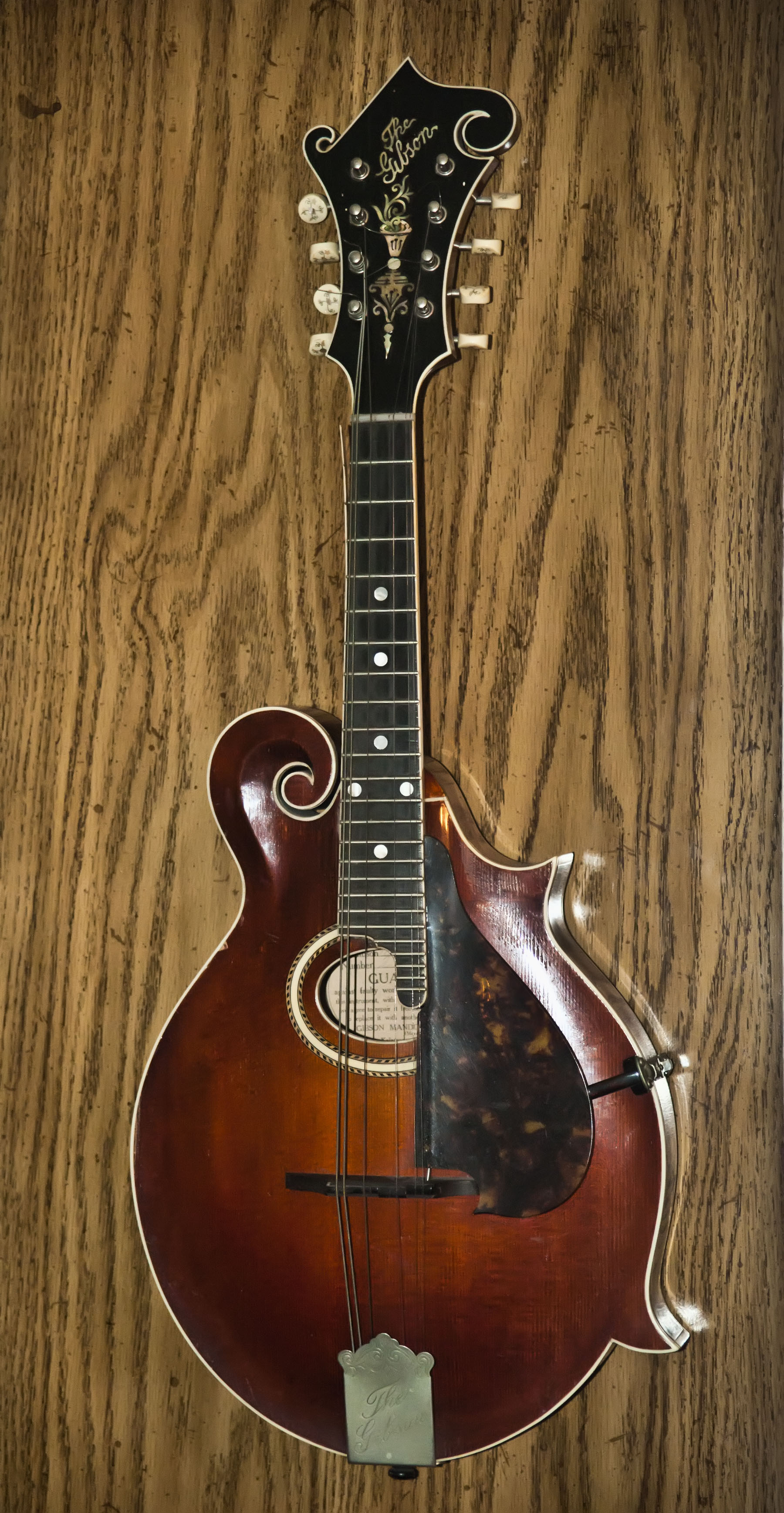
1916 Gibson F4 with arched and carved top, curled scroll and oval soundhole

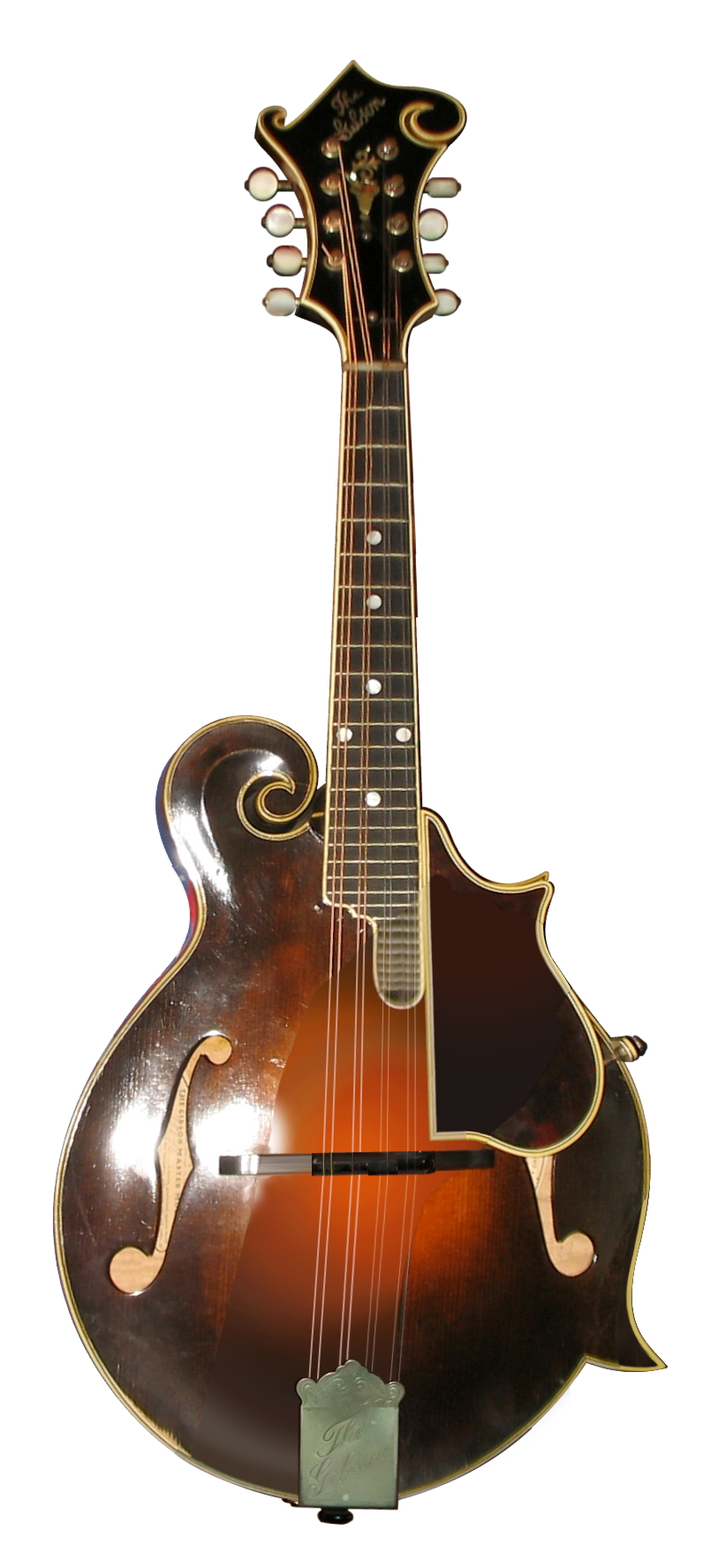
1924 Gibson F-5 mandolin, with f-shaped soundholes designed by Lloyd Loar

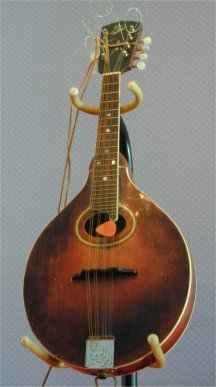
1921 Gibson A4 mandolin

At the very end of the 19th century, a new style, with a carved top and back construction inspired by violin family instruments began to supplant the European-style bowl-back instruments in the United States. This new style is credited to mandolins designed and built by Orville Gibson, a Kalamazoo, Michigan, instrument maker who founded the "Gibson Mandolin-Guitar Manufacturing Co., Limited" in 1902. Gibson mandolins evolved into two basic styles: the Florentine or F-style, which has a decorative scroll near the neck, two points on the lower body and usually a scroll carved into the headstock; and the A-style, which is pear-shaped, has no points and usually has a simpler headstock.

These styles generally have either two f-shaped soundholes like a violin (F-5 and A-5), or a single oval sound hole (F-4 and A-4 and lower models) directly under the strings. Much variation exists between makers working from these archetypes, and other variants have become increasingly common. Generally, in the United States, Gibson F-hole F-5 mandolins and mandolins influenced by that design are strongly associated with bluegrass, while the A-style is associated with other types of music, although it too is most often used for and associated with bluegrass. The F-5's more complicated woodwork also translates into a more expensive instrument.

Internal bracing to support the top in the F-style mandolins is usually achieved with parallel tone bars, similar to the bass bar on a violin. Some makers instead employ "X-bracing", which is two tone-bars mortised together to form an X. Some luthiers now using a "modified x-bracing" that incorporates both a tone bar and X-bracing.

Numerous modern mandolin makers build instruments that largely replicate the Gibson F-5 Artist models built in the early 1920s under the supervision of Gibson acoustician Lloyd Loar. Original Loar-signed instruments are sought after and extremely valuable. Other makers from the Loar period and earlier include Lyon and Healy, Vega and Larson Brothers.

==== Pressed archtops ====
The ideal for archtops has been solid pieces of wood carved into the right shape. However, another archtop exists, the top made of laminated wood or thin sheets of solid wood, pressed into the arched shape. These have become increasingly common in the world of internationally constructed musical instruments in the 21st century.

Pressed-top instruments are made to appear the same as carved-top instruments but do not sound the same as carved-wood tops. Carved-wood tops when carved to the ideal thickness, produce the sound consumers expect. Not carving them correctly dulls the sound. The sound of a carved-wood instrument changes the longer it is played, and older instruments are sought out for their rich sound.

Laminated-wood presstops are less resonant than carved wood, the wood and glue vibrating differently than wood grain. Presstops made of solid wood have the wood's natural grain compressed, typically creating a sound that is less full than a well-made, carved-top mandolin.

=== Flatback ===
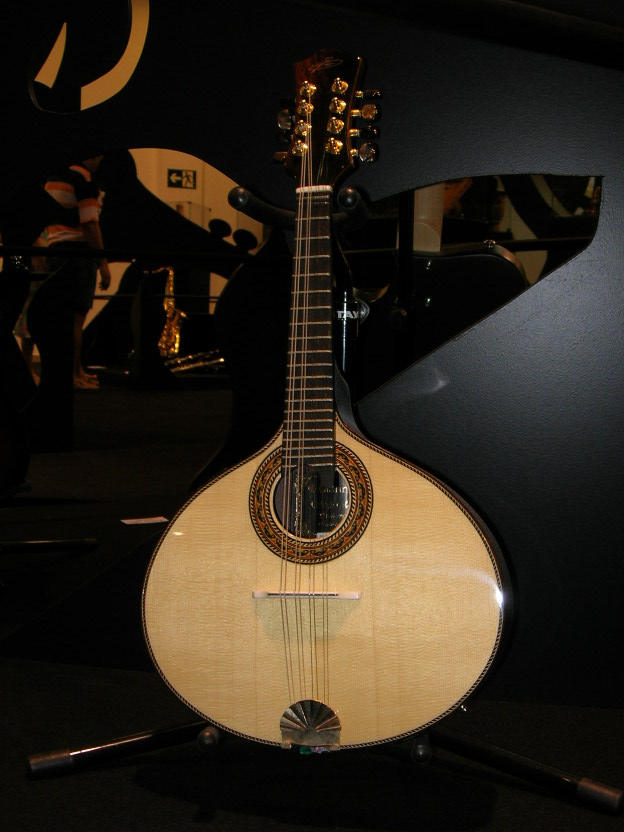
The bandolim is a Portuguese variant of the mandolin family. Instruments are flat on top and back.

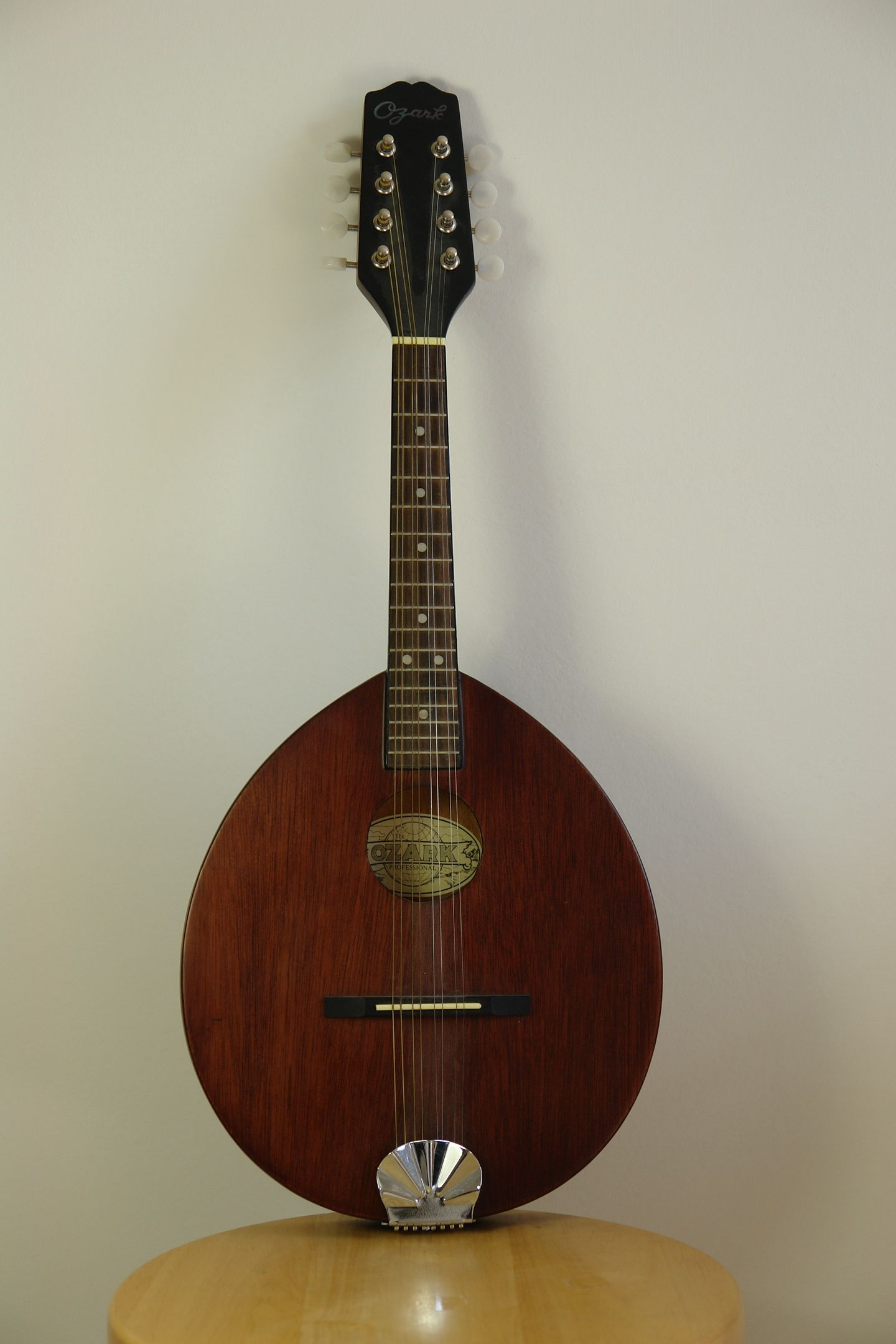
Army-Navy style mandolin

Flatback mandolins use a thin sheet of wood with bracing for the back, as a guitar uses, rather than the bowl of the bowlback or the arched back of the carved mandolins.

Like the bowlback, the flatback has a round sound hole. This has been sometimes modified to an elongated hole, called a D-hole. The body has a rounded almond shape with flat or sometimes canted soundboard.

The type was developed in Europe in the 1850s. The French and Germans called it a Portuguese mandolin, although they also developed it locally. The Germans used it in Wandervogel.

The bandolim is commonly used wherever the Spanish and Portuguese took it: in South America, in Brazil (Choro) and in the Philippines.

In the early 1970s English luthier Stefan Sobell developed a large-bodied, flat-backed mandolin with a carved soundboard, based on his own cittern design; this is often called a 'Celtic' mandolin.

American forms include the Army-Navy mandolin, the flatiron and the pancake mandolins.

==== Tone ====
The tone of the flatback is described as warm or mellow, suitable for folk music and smaller audiences. The instrument sound does not punch through the other players' sound like a carved top does.

=== Double top, double back ===
The double top is a feature that luthiers are experimenting with in the 21st century, to get better sound. However, mandolinists and luthiers have been experimenting with them since at least the early 1900s.

Back in the early 1900s, mandolinist Ginislao Paris approached Luigi Embergher to build custom mandolins. The sticker inside one of the four surviving instruments indicates the build was called after him, the Sistema Ginislao Paris. Paris' round-back double-top mandolins use a false back below the soundboard to create a second hollow space within the instrument. Neapolitan luthier Giovanni Kasermann also worked with a double top design during the same period but his efforts with that style were not met with commercial success.

Modern mandolinists such as Joseph Brent and Avi Avital use instruments customized, either by the luthier's choice or at the request of the player. Joseph Brent's mandolin, made by Brian Dean also uses what Brent calls a false back. Brent's mandolin was the luthier's solution to Brent's request for a loud mandolin in which the wood was clearly audible, with less metallic sound from the strings. The type used by Avital is variation of the flatback, with a double top that encloses a resonating chamber, sound holes on the side, and a convex back. It is made by one manufacturer in Israel, luthier Arik Kerman. Other players of Kerman mandolins include Alon Sariel, Jacob Reuven, and Tom Cohen.

=== Others ===
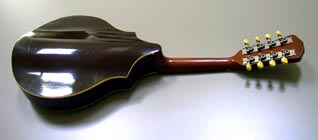
The bulge on the instrument's back side is visible in this photo of a Vega cylinder-back mandolin

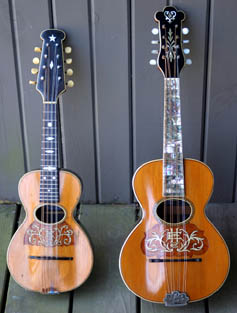
Howe-Ormes mandolinettos

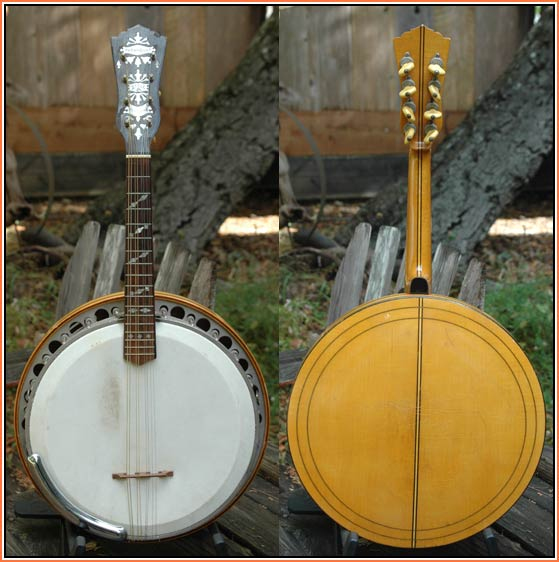
1926 Paramount Style A banjo mandolin

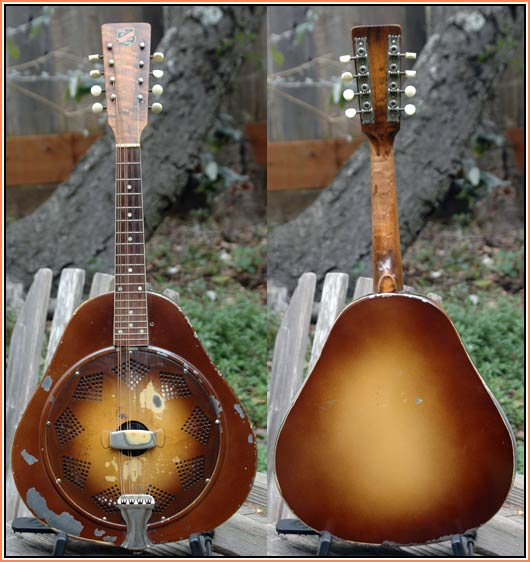
1930 National Triolian resonator mandolin

==== Mandolinetto ====
Other American-made variants include the mandolinetto or Howe-Orme guitar-shaped mandolin (manufactured by the Elias Howe Company between 1897 and roughly 1920), which featured a cylindrical bulge along the top from fingerboard end to tailpiece and the Vega mando-lute (more commonly called a cylinder-back mandolin manufactured by the Vega Company between 1913 and roughly 1927), which had a similar longitudinal bulge but on the back rather than the front of the instrument.

==== Mandolin-banjo ====
An instrument with a mandolin neck paired with a banjo-style body was patented by Benjamin Bradbury of Brooklyn in 1882 and given the name banjolin by John Farris in 1885. Today banjolin is sometimes reserved to describe an instrument with four strings, while the version with the four courses of double strings is called a mandolin-banjo.

==== Resonator mandolin ====
A resonator mandolin or "resophonic mandolin" is a mandolin whose sound is produced by one or more metal cones (resonators) instead of the customary wooden soundboard (mandolin top/face). Historic brands include Dobro and National.

==== Electric mandolin ====
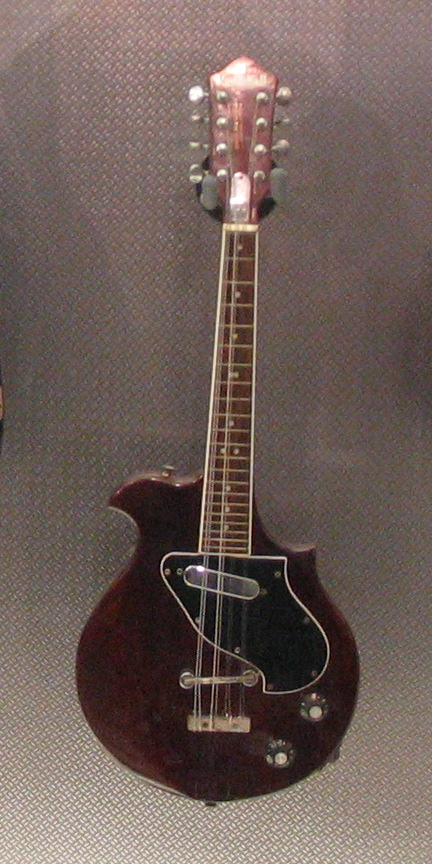
A solid-body electric mandolin

As with almost every other contemporary chordophone, another modern variant is the electric mandolin. These mandolins can have four or five individual or double courses of strings. They were developed in the early 1930s, contemporaneous with the development of the electric guitar. They come in solid body and acoustic electric forms.

Specific instruments have been designed to overcome the mandolin's rapid decay with its plucked notes. Fender released a model in 1992 with an additional string (a high A, above the E string), a tremolo bridge and extra humbucker pickup (total of two). The result was an instrument capable of playing heavy metal style guitar riffs or violin-like passages with sustained notes that can be adjusted as with an electric guitar.

== Playing traditions worldwide ==
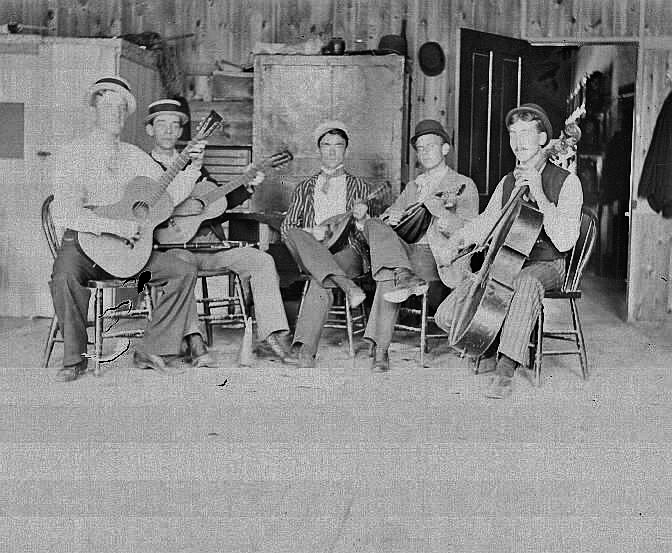
Mandolin Club from Napoleon, Ohio, approximately 1892

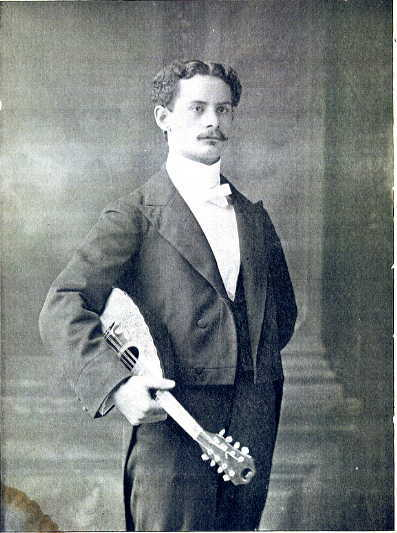
Italian mandolin virtuoso and child prodigy Giuseppe Pettine (pictured 1898) brought the Italian playing style to America where he settled in Providence, Rhode Island, as a mandolin teacher and composer. Pettine is credited with promoting a style where "one player plays both the rhythmic chords and the lyric melodic line at once, combining single strokes and tremolo"

The international repertoire of music for mandolin is almost unlimited, and musicians use it to play various types of music. This is especially true of violin music, since the mandolin has the same tuning as the violin. Following its invention and early development in Italy the mandolin spread throughout the European continent. The instrument was primarily used in a classical tradition with Mandolin orchestras, so-called Estudiantinas or in Germany Zupforchestern appearing in many cities. Following this continental popularity of the mandolin family local traditions appeared outside Europe in the Americas and in Japan. Travelling mandolin virtuosi like Carlo Curti, Giuseppe Pettine, Raffaele Calace and Silvio Ranieri contributed to the mandolin becoming a "fad" instrument in the early 20th century. This "mandolin craze" was fading by the 1930s, but just as this practice was falling into disuse, the mandolin found a new niche in American country, old-time music, bluegrass and folk music. More recently, the Baroque and Classical mandolin repertory and styles have benefited from the raised awareness of and interest in Early music, with media attention to classical players such as Israeli Avi Avital, Italian Carlo Aonzo, and American Joseph Brent. In India, the mandolin is played in classical Carnatic music. The musician U. Srinivas was perhaps the greatest mandolin player in this style. Lauded across the world for his virtuosity with the instrument, he died young. Although traditionally associated with Italian, American, and bluegrass styles, the mandolin has seen renewed popularity within Celtic and British folk traditions during the 2000s and 2010s, appearing frequently in contemporary Scottish acoustic ensembles.

== Notable literature ==
=== Western European classical music ===
The mandolin appears sporadically in the Western European classical music tradition. It was often perceived historically as a folk instrument. Significant composers did write music specifically for the mandolin, but few large works were composed for it by the most widely regarded composers. The total number of these works is rather small in comparison to—say—those composed for violin. One result of this dearth being that there were few positions for mandolinists in regular orchestras. To fill this gap in the literature, mandolin orchestras have traditionally played many arrangements of music written for regular orchestras or other ensembles. Some players have sought out contemporary composers to solicit new works.

Furthermore, of the works that have been written for mandolin from the 18th century onward, many have been lost or forgotten. Some of these await discovery in museums and libraries and archives. One example of rediscovered 18th-century music for mandolin and ensembles with mandolins is the Gimo collection, collected in the first half of 1762 by Jean Lefebure. Lefebure collected the music in Italy, and it was forgotten until manuscripts were rediscovered.

Vivaldi created some concertos for mandolinos and orchestra: one for 4-chord mandolino, string bass & continuo in C major, (RV 425), and one for two 5-chord mandolinos, bass strings & continuo in G major, (RV 532), and concerto for two mandolins, 2 violons "in Tromba"—2 flûtes à bec, 2 salmoe, 2 théorbes, violoncelle, cordes et basse continuein in C major (p. 16).

Beethoven composed mandolin music and enjoyed playing the mandolin. His 4 small pieces date from 1796: Sonatine WoO 43a; Adagio ma non troppo WoO 43b; Sonatine WoO 44a and Andante con Variazioni WoO 44b.

The opera Don Giovanni by Mozart (1787) includes mandolin parts, including the accompaniment to the famous aria Deh vieni alla finestra, and Verdi's opera Otello calls for guzla accompaniment in the aria Dove guardi splendono raggi, but the part is commonly performed on mandolin.

Gustav Mahler used the mandolin in his Symphony No. 7, Symphony No. 8 and Das Lied von der Erde.

Parts for mandolin are included in works by Schoenberg (Variations Op. 31), Stravinsky (Agon), Prokofiev (Romeo and Juliet) and Webern (opus Parts 10)

Some 20th-century composers also used the mandolin as their instrument of choice (amongst these are: Schoenberg, Webern, Stravinsky and Prokofiev).

Among the most important European mandolin composers of the 20th century are Raffaele Calace (composer, performer and luthier) and Giuseppe Anedda (virtuoso concert pianist and professor of the first chair of the Conservatory of Italian Mandolin, Padua, 1975). Today representatives of Italian classical music and Italian classical-contemporary music include Ugo Orlandi, Carlo Aonzo, Dorina Frati, Mauro Squillante and Duilio Galfetti.

Japanese composers also produced orchestral music for mandolin in the 20th century, but these are not well known outside Japan. Notable composers include Morishige Takei and Yasuo Kuwahara.

Traditional mandolin orchestras remain especially popular in Japan and Germany, but also exist throughout the United States, Europe and the rest of the world. They perform works composed for mandolin family instruments, or re-orchestrations of traditional pieces. The structure of a contemporary traditional mandolin orchestra consists of: first and second mandolins, mandolas (either octave mandolas, tuned an octave below the mandolin, or tenor mandolas, tuned like the viola), mandocellos (tuned like the cello), and bass instruments (conventional string bass or, rarely, mandobasses). Smaller ensembles, such as quartets composed of two mandolins, mandola, and mandocello, may also be found.

==== Unaccompanied solo ====
- Niccolò Paganini

Minuet

- John Peterson

Moving Fast Through Autumn Light (2000)

- Larry Sitsky

The Three Names Of Shiva (1992)

- Silvio Ranieri

Variations on a Theme by Haydn
Song of summer

- Eric Gross

Cadenza No.1
Cadenza No.2
Cadenza No.3
Cadenza No.4
Cadenza No.5
Cadenza No.6
Cadenza No.7
Cadenza No.8
Cadenza No.10
Cadenza No.11

- Raffaele Calace

Prelude No. 1
Prelude No. 2
Prelude No. 3
Prelude No. 5
Prelude No. 10
Prelude No. 11
Prelude No. 14
Prelude No. 15
Large prelude
Collard
Sylvia
Minuet of rose

- Heinrich Koniettsuni

Partita No. 1, etc.

- Herbert Baumann

Sonatine, etc.

- Siegfried Behrend

Sense – structure

- John Craton

The Gray Wolf
Perpetuum Mobile
Variations from Der Fluyten Lust-hof

- Sakutarō Hagiwara

Hataoriru maiden

- Takei Shusei

Spring to go

- Seiichi Suzuki

Variations on Schubert lullaby
City of Elm
Variations on Kojonotsuki of subject matter

- Gilad Hochman

Two Episodes for solo mandolin

- Jiro Nakano

"Spring has come" Variations
Prayer
Fantasia second No.
Serenata
Beautiful my child and where
Prayer of the evening
Variations on September Affair of the subject matter

- Makino YukariTaka

Spring snow of ballads

- Jo Kondo

In early spring

- Takashi Kubota

Nocturne
Etude
Fantasia first No.

- Yasuo Kuwahara

Moon and mountain witch
Impromptu
Winter Light
Mukyu motion
Jon-gara
Silent door

==== Accompaniment with solo ====
- Ludwig van Beethoven

Sonatine in C minor, WoO 43a
Adagio in E♭ major WoO 43b
Sonatine in C major WoO 44a
Andante and Variations in D major WoO 44b

- John Craton

Dioces aztecas
The Legend of Princess Noccalula

- Giovanni Hoffmann

4 Quartet for Mandolin, Violin, Viola, and Lute
4 Divertimenti for Mandolin, Violin & B.c.

- Johann Nepomuk Hummel

Sonata in C major Op. 35

- Vittorio Monti

Csárdás

- Carlo Munier

Spanish Capriccio
Mazurka for concert
Waltz for concert
Bizaria
Aria Varia data
Mandolin Concerto No. 1

- Raffaele Calace

Mandolin Concerto No. 1
Mandolin Concerto No. 2
Mukyu motion
Tarantella
Song of Nostalgia
Elegy
Mazurka for concert

- Silvio Ranieri

Warsaw of memories

- Enrico Marcelli

Gypsy style Capriccio
Fantastic Waltz
Mukyu motion
Polonaise for concert

- Hans Gál

Divertimento for mandolin and harp
Such as a duo for the mandolin and guitar

- Norbert Shupuronguru

Serenade for mandolin and guitar

- Franco Marugora

Grand Sonata for mandolin and guitar

- Kurt Schwaen

Slovenia wind Dances such as

- Dietrich Erdmann

Sonatine

- Mari Takano

Light of silence

- Rikuya Terashima

Sonata for mandolin and piano (2002)

==== Duo and musical ensemble ====
A duet or duo is a musical composition for two performers in which the performers have equal importance to the piece. A musical ensemble with more than two solo instruments or voices is called trio, quartet, quintet, sextet, septet, octet, etc.

- Ella Von Adajewska-Schultz (1846–1926)

Venezuelan Serenade

- Valentine Abt (1873–1942)

In Venice Waters

- Charles Acton

Chants Des Gondoliers

- Hermann Ambrosius

Duo

- Emanuele Barbella

Sonata in D major for Mandolin and Basso Continuo

- Ignazio Bitelli (c. 1880–1956)

L'Albero di Natale, pastorale for mandolin & guitar
Il Gondoliere, valse for 2 mandolins & guitar

- Costantino Bertucci

Il Carnevale Di Venezia Con Variazioni

- Pietro Gaetano Boni (1686–1741)

Sonate pour mandoline en la, Op. 2 n° 1
Sonate pour mandoline en ré mineur, Op. 2 n° 2
Sonate pour mandoline en ré, Op. 2 n° 9

- Antonio Del Buono

"In Gondola" Serenata Veneziana "Ai Mandolnisti Di Venezia

- Raffaele Calace

Barcarola Op. 100 Per Chitarra
Barcarola Op. 116 Per Liuto "A Mio Figlio Peppino"

- Gioacchino Cocchi

- Sinfonia for 2 Mandolins & Continuo, (Gimo 76)

- Jules Cottin

Au Fil De L'Eau

- John Craton

Charon Crossing the Styx (mandolin & double bass)
Four Whimsies (mandolin & octave mandolin)
Les gravures de Gustave Doré (mandolin & guitar)
Six Pantomimes for Two Mandolins
Sonatina No. 3 for Mandolin & Violin

- Hans Gál

Op. 59a Sonatina for 2 mandolins (1952)

- Eric Gross

Hooperisms Op.181 (1991)

- Eric Gross

Barbara and Deborah Op.175 (1990)

- Eric Gross

Three Mandolin Duets Op.282 (2005)

- Eric Gross

Paul and Adrian Op.165(1989)

- Giovani Battista Gervasio

Sonata for Mandolin & Continuo (Gimo 141)
Sonata per camera (Gimo 143)
Sinfonia for 2 Mandolins & Continuo, (Gimo 149)
Trio for 2 Mandolins & Continuo, (Gimo 150)
Sonata in D major for Mandolin and Basso Continuo
Sonata in G major for Mandolin and Basso Continuo

- Giuseppe Giuliano

Sonata in D major for Mandolin and Basso Continuo

- Geoffrey Gordon

Interiors of a Courtyard (mandolin & guitar)

- Addiego Guerra

Sonata in G major for Mandolin and Basso Continuo

- Positive Hattori

Concerto for two mandolin and piano

- Sean Hickey

Mandolin Canons (mandolin & guitar)

- Giovanni Hoffmann

3 Duets for Mandolin and Violin
Serenade for Viola and Mandolin

- Tyler Kaier

Den lille Havfrue (mandolin & guitar)

- Peter Machajdík

Mit den Augen eines Falken for mandolin & guitar (2016)

- Giovanni Battista Maldura

Barcarola Veneziana Di Mendelssohn

- Edward Mezzacapo (1832–1898)

Le Chant Du Gondolier

- Heinrich Molbe (1835–1915)

Gondolata Op. 74 Per Mandolino, Clarinetto E Pianoforte

- Carlo Munier (1859–1911)

"In Gondola" Ricordi di Mendelssohn
Notturno Veneziano Per Quartetto Romantico

- Jiro Nakano

Medaka, revolving lantern

- John Peterson

Wired Life (1999)

- Giuseppe Pettine (1874–1966)

Barcarola Per Mandolino

- Hideo Saito, Jiro Nakano

Du edge Martino

- Domenico Scarlatti

Sonata in D minor (K77)
Sonata in E minor (K81)
Sonata in G minor (K88)
Sonata No. 54 (K. 89) in D minor for Mandolin and Basso Continuo
Sonata in D minor (K89)
Sonata in D minor (K90)
Sonata in G (K91)

- Mari Takano

Silent Light for mandolin & harpsichord (2001)
Two Pieces for Two Mandolins (2002)

- Sergeij Taneev (1856–1913)

Venezia Di Notte, Barcarola Op. 9 No. 1
Serenata Per Voce, Mandolino E Pianoforte Op. 9 No. 2 Alla Contessa Tat'jana L'vovna Tolstaja

- Roberto Valentini (1674–1747)

Sonate pour mandoline en la, Op. 12 n° 1
Sonate pour mandoline en ré mineur, Op. 12 n° 2
Sonate pour mandoline en sol, Op. 12 n° 3
Sonate pour mandoline en sol mineur, Op. 12 n° 4
Sonate pour mandoline en mi mineur, Op. 12 n° 5
Sonate pour mandoline en ré, Op. 12 n° 6

==== Concerto ====
Concerto: a musical composition generally composed of three movements, in which, usually, one solo instrument (for instance, a piano, violin, cello or flute) is accompanied by an orchestra or concert band.

- Anna Clyne

Three Sisters, for mandolin and chamber orchestra

- Eric Gross

Concerto for Mandolin and Chamber Orchestra Op.141 (1984)
Concerto No. 2 Op.151 (1986)

- Larry Sitsky

Zohar, Sephardic Concerto (1998)

- Jane Stanley

The Spirit's Lay Concerto for Mandolin and Orchestra (2000)

- Caroline Szeto

Concerto For Mandolin and Chamber Orchestra (1998)

- Giovanni Hoffmann

Concerto for Mandolin and Orchestra in D Major

- Antonio Vivaldi

Mandolin Concerto in C major,
Concerto for two mandolinos in G major
Concerto for two mandolinos, 2 violons " in Tromba"—2 flûtes à bec, 2 salmoe, 2 théorbes, violoncelle, cordes et basse continuein in C major

- Francisco Rodrigo Arto (Venezuela)

Mandolin Concerto (1984)

- Dominico Caudioso

Mandolin Concerto in G Major

- John Craton

Mandolin Concerto No. 1 in D Minor
Mandolin Concerto No. 2 in D Major
Mandolin Concerto No. 3 in E Minor
Mandolin Concerto No. 4 in G Major
Concerto for Two Mandolins ("Rromane Bjavela")

- Gerardo Enrique Dirié (Argentina)

Los ocho puentes for four recorders, mandolin and percussion (1984)

- Johann Adolph Hasse

Mandolin Concerto in G major

- Leopold Kozeluch

Concerto for piano, mandolin, trumpet and double bass in E♭ major

- Giovanni Battista Pergolesi

Mandolin Concerto in B♭ major

- Giovanni Paisiello

Mandolin Concerto in E♭ major
Mandolin Concerto in C major
Mandolin Concerto in G major

- Johann Nepomuk Hummel

Mandolin Concerto in G major

- Armin Kaufmann

Mandolin Concerto

- Dietrich Erdmann

Mandolin Concerto

- Herbert Baumann

Mandolin and the Concerto for Strings

- Brian Israel (1951–1986)

Concerto for Mandolin (1985)
Sonatinetta (1984)
Surrealistic Serenade (1985)

- Makino YukariTaka

Mandolin Concerto

- Julian Dawes

Mandolin and the Concerto for Strings

- Tanaka Ken

"Arc" for mandolin and orchestra

- Vladimir Kororutsuku

Suite "positive and negative"

- Avner Dorman

Mandolin Concerto

- Gilad Hochman

"Nedudim" ("Wanderings") Fantasia-Concertante for mandolin and string orchestra (2014)

==== Mandolin in the orchestra ====
Orchestral works in which the mandolin has a limited part.

- Domenico Cimarosa

Opera La finta parigina

- John Craton

Opera The Curious Affair of the Count of Monte Blotto

- Michel Corrette

Concerto for orchestra 25 Concertos Comiques: Concerto nr 24 in C major "La Marche du Huron"

- Jonathan Dove

Opera "The Adventures of Pinocchio" (2007)

- Lukas Foss

Symphony No. 2 "Symphony Of Chorales" (1958)

- André Grétry

L'Amant jaloux (Paris, 1778)

- George Frideric Handel

Oratorio Alexander Balus

- György Ligeti

Opera Le Grand Macabre

- Bruno Maderna

Opera Don Perlimplin, ovvero il trionfo dell'amore e dell'immaginazione
Violin concerto (1969)
Suite aus der Oper "Hyperion" (1969–1970)
"Amanda"/Serenata VI
"Composizione in tre tempi"

- Gustav Mahler

Symphony No. 7, Song of the Night
Symphony No. 8, Symphony of Thousands
Symphony Song of the Earth

- Wolfgang Amadeus Mozart

Opera Don Giovanni

- Giovanni Paisiello

The Barber of Seville

- Willem Pijper

Opera Halewijn
Romance sans paroles
Symphony No. 2
Symphony No. 3

- Sergei Prokofiev

Ballet music Romeo and Juliet

- Ottorino Respighi

Symphonic poem Festivals of Rome

- Antonio Salieri

Tarare (Paris, 1787)

- Rodion Shchedrin

Ballet music Anna Karenina

- Arnold Schoenberg

Opera Moses und Aron
Variations for Orchestra

- Niccola Spinelli

Opera A Basso Porto: Intermezzo for mandolins and orchestra

- Igor Stravinsky

Ballet music Agon

- Giuseppe Verdi

Opera Otello

- Antonio Vivaldi

Oratorio Juditha triumphans

- Anton Webern

Five Pieces for Orchestra

== See also ==
- List of mandolinists
- List of mandolinists (sorted)
- List of string instruments
- Stringed instrument tunings
- Pandura
- Quintola
- Greek bouzouki
- Bluegrass mandolin
- Mandola
- Octave Mandolin
- Mandocello
- Mandobass
- Cittern
- Domra
- Irish bouzouki
- Portuguese guitar
- Troise and his Mandoliers
