= Pettine =

Pettine is an Italian surname that may refer to the following notable people:

- Giuseppe Pettine (1874–1966), Italian-American mandolinist
- Mike Pettine (born 1966), American football coach and former player
- Raymond James Pettine (1912–2003), United States District Judge

Pettine is also the Italian word for "comb," and can refer to the ridged board on which certain pasta shapes are made, like garganelli
