= Giovanni Kasermann =

20th century Italian luthier

Giovanni Käsermann (1881-1965) was a Neapolitan luthier during the first half of the 20th century specializing in mandolins. His workshop was located at Via Carbonara 112 (Palazzo Caracciolo) in Naples, Italy.

His instruments from the early 1900s bear various labels marked "Fratelli Häsermann," while later instruments in the 1910s to 1940s are labeled "Giovanni Käsermann." His craftsmanship featured classic Neapolitan mandolin styles apparent on his decorative bowlback mandolins, but he is also credited with employing a novel double-top design.

An advertisement for Käsermann's workshop published in the 1922 Musique-Adresses Universel states, "A distinguished workshop for Neapolitan mandolins. Unsurpassed concert mandolins for soloists, featuring a marvelous tone and absolutely perfect intonation in every position—a level of quality never before attained in such instruments. We also offer mandolas, mandoloncellos, lutes, mandolones, and guitars, as well as tortoiseshell plectrum and high-quality musical strings for all types of instruments."

In 1922, Käsermann, along with fellow prominent mandolin makers Fratelli Vinaccia, Raffaele Calace, and Luigi Embergher, donated mandolins to be given as a prize at a historic mandolin playing competition held in Naples. The organizing committee described Käsermann as one of the finest Italian makers of mandolins and stated that his instruments are highly sought-after. His donated instrument was described as a magnificent instrument, full of sweet and robust sound, containing an interior label signed by Käsermann, and deserving to be awarded to one of the finest soloists.

Fine instrument auctions confirm Käsermann also made guitars, with one listed at the Phillip's London Musical Instruments Auction in 1980. The lot is described as, "An Italian Guitar by GIOVANNI KASERMANN bearing the maker's signed label in Naples, dated 1928. The two-piece back and sides of medium curl maple with rosewood and purfling surround, the table of medium grain pine, the circular soundhole and table surround of patterned mother-o'-pearl inset black plastic. The fingerboard with alternate between frets of mother-o'-pearl and ebony divisions. The six string machine head culminating in a violin scroll. Pin bridge. (Three open cracks on lower table.)"

Aside from plucked instruments, Käsermann also made a violin that was exhibited at the 1937 National Violin Making Exhibition and Competition in Cremona, Italy.

Käsermann instruments have surfaced in online marketplaces with labels dated well into the 1940s, and his inclusion in Vannes' Dictionnaire universel des luthiers suggests he may have been commercially active until at least 1951 or later.
