= Beethoven's mandolin music =

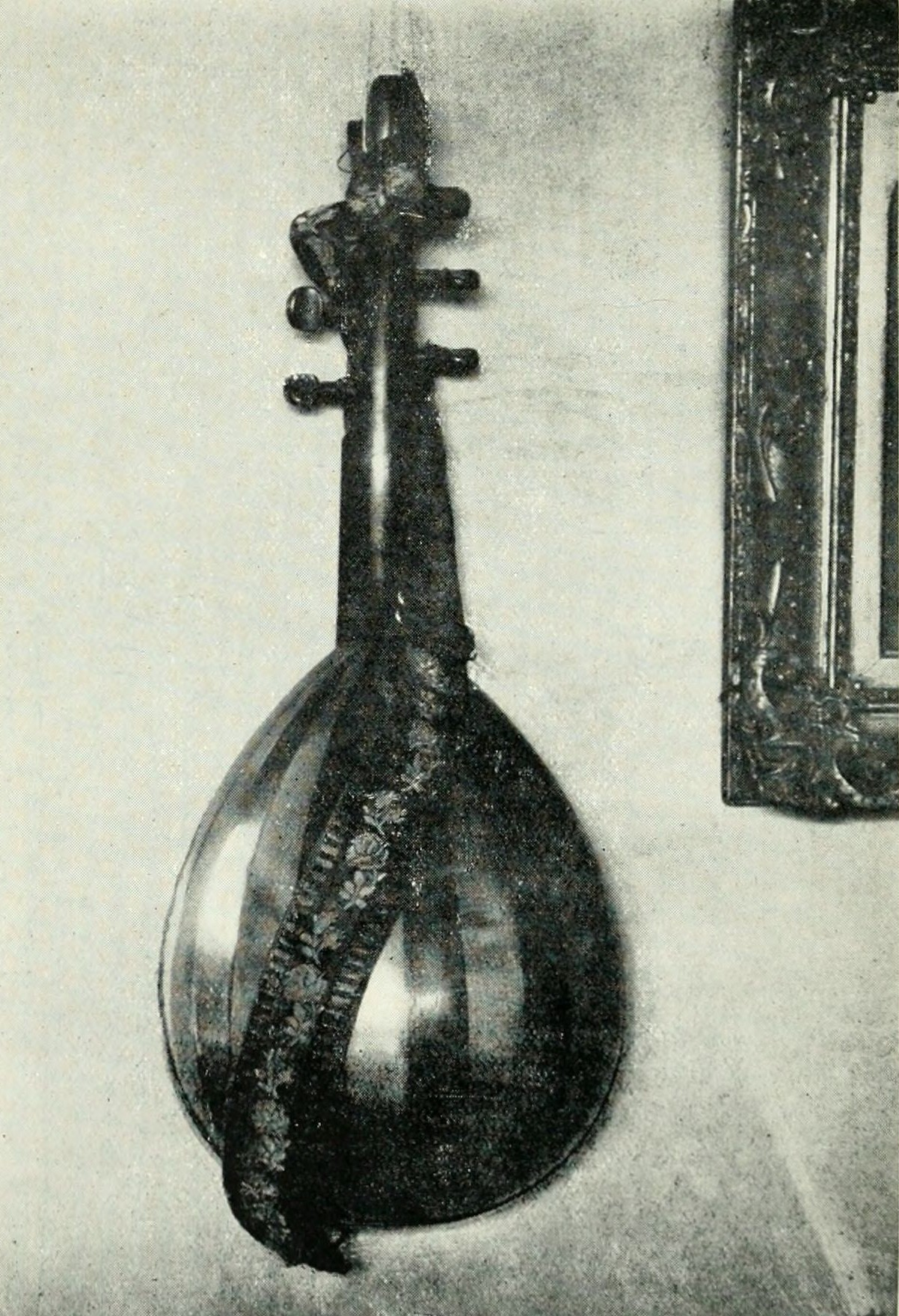
Beethoven's Milanese mandolin, hung beside the piano in his home

Ludwig van Beethoven composed at least six works for mandolin, four of which survive. None were published during his lifetime. Though known better as a pianist, Beethoven possessed a Milanese mandolin, which was hung beside his piano. He was friends with two prominent mandolinists, both of whom were linked to his surviving mandolin music.

== Wenzel Krumpholz ==
Beethoven cultivated a relationship with Wenzel Krumpholz, a Bohemian violinist and mandolin virtuoso who played the violin in the opera orchestra in Vienna. Carl Czerny wrote of Krumpholz that he was one of the first to recognize Beethoven's genius.

Beethoven had met Krumpholz in Vienna in 1795, after the release of Beethoven's Three Trios for Piano, Op. 1. Beethoven took violin lessons from Krumpholz and "the close relationship between Beethoven and Krumpholz may have led to the composition of two pieces for mandolin and harpsichord" (WoO 43, Numbers 1 and 2). As these were likely first attempts, Beethoven never published the pieces.

== Josephine de Clary ==
The other mandolinist was Josephine of Clary-Aldringen, the wife of Count Christian Christoph Clam-Gallas and mother of Eduard Clam-Gallas; the couple invited Beethoven in on his first visit to Prague to their palace, and he dedicated the aria "Ah! perfido" to the count's wife.

Josephine was a student of Johann Baptist Kucharz, a composer and organist who was also a mandolinist. He was the first to play mandolin in Mozart's Don Giovanni in the first production in 1787.

Joseph Braunstein said that Beethoven composed the second set of works (WoO 44, Numbers 1 and 2) in 1796, after he met Josephine in Prague. He also "revised" the second of his 1795 works (WoO43 #2) for the countess, adding a dedication, "pour la belle Josephine." According to Robert Cummings, Beethoven's four works using mandolin were all composed for the countess and were discovered in her husband's collection.

Beethoven wrote his mandolin works near the beginning of his career. The works are numbered in the WoO system of 'works without opus number', which designates compositions written throughout his career which were never published with an opus number. For example, "Ah! perfido", Op. 65, dedicated to countess Josephine and written about the same time as the mandolin sonatas, wasn't given an opus number until 1819. Beethoven was not known for his mandolin works, and ultimately focused elsewhere. However, Joseph Braunstein said of these pieces that, although "not great music ... they are valuable miniatures that fit well, biographically and stylistically, into the period of Beethoven's Opus 1, his first sonatas, the String Trio in E-flat, the song "Adelaide", and the Piano Concerto in B-flat."

== Mandolin works ==
- Sonatina in C minor, WoO 43, No. 1
- Adagio in E-flat, WoO 43, No. 2
- Sonatina in C, WoO 44, No. 1
- Andante and Variations in D, WoO 44, No. 2

== Recordings ==
- Mandolin music, Beethoven, Hummel, Maria Scivittaro (mandolin), Robert Veyron-Lacroix (harpsichord & piano), (1969, Nonesuch Records, New York)
- Beethoven Rarities for mandolin and piano, for violin and piano by Lajos Mayer (mandolin), Imre Rohmann (piano), Bela Banfalvi (violin), Sándor Falvai (piano) (1982, Hungaroton records)
- Beethoven, Hummel, Hoffmann: Works For Mandolin & Fortepiano, Duilio Galfetti (mandolin), Diego Fasolis (forte piano) (2000, Arts Music )
