= Jiro Nakano =

Japanese composer

- Born: 10 April 1902; Aichi, Japan
- Died: 10 June 2000 (aged 98)
- Other name: 中野 二郎
- Occupation: composer

Jiro Nakano (中野 二郎 = Nakano Jirō) (10 April 1902 – 10 June 2000) was a Japanese composer, conductor and arranger from Aichi Prefecture. He composed works for solo guitar, solo mandolin and Mandolin orchestra.

== Works ==
=== Mandolin orchestra ===
- Una notte di villaggio pescatori
- Capriccio sul canto d'Ainu
- Il libro pitture racconti dell antici Giapponese

=== Mandolin solo ===
- 2. Fantasia
- Harugakita con variazioni
- Preghiera
- Il canto delle foglie cadute
- Notturno stellato
- Serenata
- Rêverie du soir (Notturno)
- Tre studi
- Terra natale

=== Guitar solo ===
- Tema e Variazioni (Arirang)
- 30 Variazioni su un tema di Paganini
- Uno fiore
- Sentimento de Otono
- Canto de la peregrina
- Una Gaviota
- La iglesia sobre la colina
- Le Tour de reclame etincelant
- Juego de pelotilla
- Minuetto
- Pioggia de Maggio
- El camino del campo
