= Giovanni Hoffmann =

Giovanni Hoffmann (c. 1770 — 1814?) was a composer and mandolinist who dwelled in Vienna, c. 1800, and has works preserved in the Austrian Gesellschaft der Musikfreunde archives in Vienna. Konrad Wölki said that he produced an "extensive creative output," for mandolin with other instruments, to include duets, a concerto, quartets, divertimenti, sonatas and further works in different forms."

Almost nothing is known of him save that several compositions for mandolin in the Gesellschaft der Musikfreunde bear his name. Some bear a publication date of 1799. It is presumed that "Giovanni" is an Italianization of the name "Johann", but this cannot be proven. A concerto for mandolin and a quartet, the latter in an arrangement, have been recorded and, in 2023, on the Brillant Classics label, four quartets with mandolin played by Federico Maddaluno, Alberto Marano, Myriam Traverso, Alessandro Parfitt.

== Works ==
- Three duets for mandolin and violin (Opus 1)
- Three duets for mandolin and violin (Opus 2)
- Sonata in D minor for mandolin and guitar
- Sonata in C major for mandolin and bass
- Concerto for mandolin and orchestra in D major (strings and wind)
