= Luigi Embergher =

Antonio Luigi Embergher

1925 Mandolin sold by the Vichy Enchères auction, described as Model 5A "Cubist". This model never became a success and this is the only known example. During the 1930s, Italy's fascists introduced the concept of Degenerate art, a movement that condemned Futurism. The political upheavals were enough that Embergher had to shut down most of his business, including that which made this work of modern art. Photo by Jacques Henri Bayle

Antonio Luigi Embergher (4 February 1856, in Arpino – 12 May 1943, in Rome) was an Italian luthier known for his high quality bowlback mandolins. Son of the ebanist Pietro Embergher and Maria Ciccarelli, Born in Arpino 1856.

== Life and work ==
In the 1890s he collaborated with the Mandolin virtuoso G. B. Maldura, creating a series of concert mandolins for mandolin orchestras including two mandolin types, a mandoliola (also called Octave mandola) and a mandoloncello, all suited for playing string quartet pieces for mandolin. They were first displayed in Turin in 1898, and soon became came to set the standard measures for mandolin orchestras. Embergher made instruments from approximately 1880 through 1935. He is considered to have taken Rome's standard of building mandolins, exemplified by luthiers Giovanni De Santis and Giovanni Battista Maldura, and improved upon it. His instruments became known for their "strong, sonorous warm sound and a perfect intonation." Among improvements he made was to change the way the instrument sounded making alterations to the sound board and sound chamber. He also added a zero-fret, an extension of the fingerboard under the 2nd string up to the g, and a highly pronounced 'V'-shape in the cross-section of the neck. Instruments from his atelier were considered "the finest instruments" and demand for them rose until he was employing 15 luthiers in his workshop and exporting to other countries.

World-renowned mandolin virtuoso Silvio Ranieri did much to extend the fame of Embergher's instruments. Ranieri only performed using Embergher mandolins, and he compared them to the Stradivarius violin in perfection. After hearing one of his performances, Embergher gave Ranieri a superb instrument that had won the gold medal at a 1900 exhibition in Paris, and the two remained close friends. In 1904 a glowing review of one of Ranieri's concerts concluded by stating that "We are sure that Ranieri will not be offended if we attribute a part of his great triumphs to the excellence of his wonderful instrument. The instruments of Embergher are unequalled, not only the richness and fullness of tone are remarkable, but the intonation is also perfect"

In 1913, for his successful career, Embergher was knighted as "Cavaliere della Corona d'Italia" (Knight of the Order of the Italian Crown).

At the height of production, his shop produced between 80 and 100 mandolins a month, mainly mandolins, but also the terzino, mandola, mandoloncello, liuto cantabile and the mandobasso, all used in the mandolin orchestras of the day. Political upheavals in the 1930s made it difficult to export his instruments, and he closed his shop, continuing to make instruments for Italians in his atelier.

After his death in 1943, instruments were made with his standards by luthiers Domenico Cerrone (from 1938 to 1954) and his son Giannino Cerrone, and by Pasquale Pecoraro. Pecoraro was the last to build "in the exact Embergher-design and manner," and died in 1987.

== Types ==
1920s Mandola (5-bis) built in Rome by Luigi Embergher

There were eleven versions of his Roman pattern mandolins, indicated with the letters A or B and with a number. Type A and B were Mandolini da studio, student quality instruments. Mandolins Numbers 1—4 were orchestra instruments. Mandolins 5, 5-bis, and 6 were for the concert artist and soloist. Numbers 7 and 8 were elite instruments, more decorated than the other models.

The number 5 was sought after by virtuoso performers and "great masters." The number 8 was a more luxurious instrument and inlaid with ivory and mother-of-pearl; one of these was bought by Maria Feodorovna, the Queen mother of Tsar Nicholas II of Russia, in 1902.

== Works cited ==
- Sparks, Paul (2005). The Classical Mandolin. Oxford University Press.
- Tyler, James; Sparks, Paul (1996). "The Mandolin: Its Structure and Performance (Sixteenth to Twentieth Centuries)". Performance Practice Review. 9 (2) 5. doi:10.5642/perfpr.199609.02.05.
