= Herbert Baumann =

German composer (1925–2020)

- Born: 31 July 1925; Berlin, Germany
- Died: 21 January 2020 (aged 94); Munich, Germany
- Occupations: Conductor; Composer
- Organization: Herbert-Baumann-Stiftung
- Awards: Order of Merit of the Federal Republic of Germany

Herbert Baumann (31 July 1925 – 21 January 2020) was a German composer and conductor. His compositions were mainly for theatre and film, at theatres in Berlin and Munich, such as ballet music for Alice im Wunderland and Rumpelstilzchen.

== Life ==
Baumann was born in Berlin and began to study architecture, as his father wished. He studied conducting at the same time with Sergiu Celibidache, who was serving his first season with the Berlin Philharmonic. Baumann turned completely to music. He composed a piece as a conducting exercise that impressed Celibidache, who showed it to Paul Höffer, a composition professor.

Baumann then studied composition with Höffer at the Internationales Musikinstitut in Berlin, and after Höffer's death with Boris Blacher. He worked as leader of the stage music for the Waldsee open air stage. At age 22, he was recommended by Höffer as director of stage music at the Deutsches Theater in Berlin, a position that he held for six years, composing for the performances. In 1953, he moved on to the Staatliche Schauspielbühnen in West Berlin, and then to Munich in 1970, where he worked for the Residenz Theatre. He worked freelance from 1979. His ballet Alice im Wunderland, based on Lewis Carroll's novel Alice's Adventures in Wonderland, was premiered on 23 December 1984 at the Hessisches Staatstheater Wiesbaden. The success prompted a commission from the Städtische Bühnen Augsburg for a ballet Rumpelstilzchen, premiered in 1986. Carroll himself was a character in the ballet, named Der Dichter (The Author). A CD review of the Alice music, played by the NDR Radiophilharmonie conducted by the composer, described it as a neo-Romantic score with delicate instrumentation and clever story-telling ideas for his main characters Alice and Der Dichter.

Baumann received the Order of Merit of the Federal Republic of Germany in 1998. The same year, he founded the Herbert-Baumann-Stiftung, a foundation for the support of plucked instruments by concerts, festivals and competitions. He became an honorary member of the Tonkünstlerverband München in 2015.

Baumann died in Munich in January 2020 at the age of 94.
