= Giuseppe Pettine =

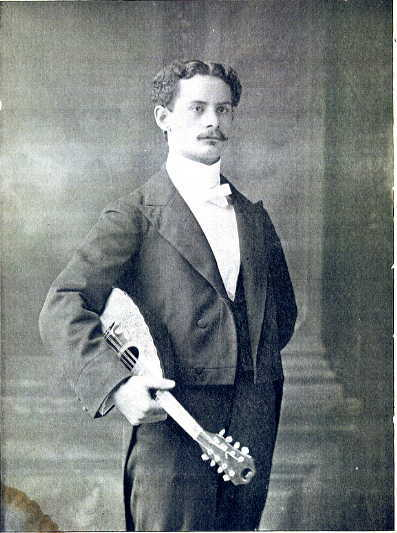
- Giuseppe Pettine in 1898

Background information
- Born: Giuseppe Antonio Luigi Pettine; 13 February 1874
- Origin: Isernia, Italy
- Died: 1966 (aged 91–92)
- Occupations: Musician, teacher, composer
- Instrument: Mandolin

Giuseppe Pettine (born Giuseppe Antonio Luigi Pettine; in Isernia, Italy, 13 February 1874 – 1966) was an Italian-American concert mandolinist, teacher, and composer.

== Early life and career ==
Pettine started to study the mandolin with Camille Mastropaolo at a very early age. After the Pettine family emigrated to the United States in 1889 and settled in Providence, Rhode Island, Giuseppe was regarded as a child prodigy of the mandolin because of his great concert appearances. Raffaele Calace (1863–1934) dedicated his First Mandolin Concerto op. 113 to Pettine, his fellow countryman and friend, in honor of his skills and passion for the mandolin.

Pettine was a member of the Big Trio, a trio formed by guitarist William Foden, banjoist Frederick Bacon and Giuseppe Pettine on mandolin. He published a mandolin method book in 1896, and a comprehensive seven-volume tutorial for the mandolin, titled Pettine's Modern Mandolin School. He also became a teacher of the Italian mandolin technique. Members of his school of American mandolinists include William Place Jr. (1889–1959) and Alfonso Balasone (Albert Bellson, 1897–1977). Today the Pettine method is still regarded as one of the most comprehensive works for mandolin ever published.

== Mandolin design ==
Besides these activities Pettine was concerned with the development and production of fine mandolins. For this he worked in close cooperation with the well-known VEGA musical instrument manufacturers company in Boston, creating the "Giuseppe Pettine Special" model, a soloist mandolin modelled after the modern Neapolitan mandolin designed by the Vinaccia luthier family of Naples.

== Composer ==
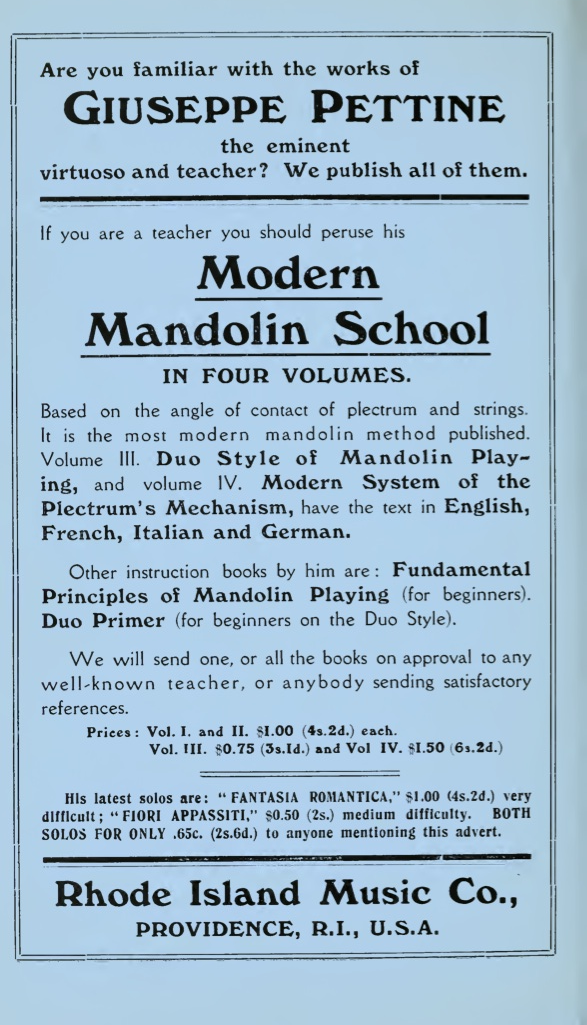
1914 advertisement for mandolin instruction books by Pettine from the book The Guitar and Mandolin by Philip J. Bone.

As a composer he greatly contributed to the mandolin repertoire, writing original music for solo mandolin and mandolin in combination with other instruments. Works include his published three-movement concerto titled Concerto Patetico for mandolin and piano accompaniment. This concerto also exists in an unpublished incomplete version for solo mandolin and orchestra consisting of winds and plucked instruments. The orchestra parts were written for first and second mandolin, mandola, mandoloncello, bass, tenor banjo, flute, piccolo flute, clarinet in A, bassoon, horn in F and timbales.

Another of Pettine's compositions for solo mandolin is his Fantasia Romantica, a substantial work in which he emphasizes the wonderful possibilities of the instrument by including seldom-heard harmonics, both natural and artificial, with chord arpeggios and virtuosic scale passages.

Not all of Pettine's works were for the mandolin. In 1925, he published 44 Solos in Duo Style, a book of moderate- to advanced-level etudes and solo pieces for the tenor banjo. According to the book's preface, it was written twenty-five years after his "systematized 'Duo School' for the Mandolin" and was "the first complete book on the 'Duo Style of Tenor Banjo Playing'."

== Praise ==
George C. Krick (1871–1962), a well-known guitarist, mandolinist, and contemporary of Pettine, wrote, "The man who undoubtedly has contributed more than anyone else to the American literature of the mandolin is Giuseppe Pettine." And "His concert repertoire includes many of the great violin concertos and original compositions and his concert tours have taken him from Maine to California. Amongst his numerous compositions the Concerto Patetico, for mandolin and piano, is his greatest contribution to mandolin literature."

Pettine died in 1966.

== Bibliography ==
- Janssens, R. Geschiedenis van de Mandoline, Antwerp, 1982.
- Krick, G. C. Internet site of the FMI (www.federmandolino.it)
- Sparks, P. The Classical Mandolin, Oxford 1995.
- Timmerman, A. CD Booklet Fantasia Romantica Sebastiaan de Grebber, 2006.
- Walz, R. Giuseppe Pettine 1874-1966, Plectrum FMI, Italy, 2004.
- Gioielli, M. Giuseppe Pettine, il leggendario mandolinista isernino, "Utriculus", X, n. 37, 2006, pp. 29–36.
- www.maurogioelli.net

== See also ==
- List of mandolinists (sorted)
