= Quintola =

String instrument
- Classification: String instrument
- Developed: United Kingdom

The Quintola is one of several stringed instruments.

== Violin Quintola ==
This type of Quintola is like a violin, but with 5 strings. It was developed by violin maker Victor Baston of Southall, United Kingdom in 1972.

== Mandolin-Mandola hybrids ==
This type of Quintola is like a mandolin or mandola, but with either 5 single strings or 10 strings in 4 paired courses. It is usually tuned C-G-D-A-E, combining the tuning of both the mandolin and mandola. They will sometimes have fanned fretboards to accommodate this tuning.

== Historical instruments ==
The name Quintola was also used historically to refer to the Gittern, along with the similar term Quintern. This instrument later evolved into the mandore and the mandolin.

== Other types ==
There is also an instrument like the charango that uses the name Quintola.
