= Mari Takano =

Japanese composer

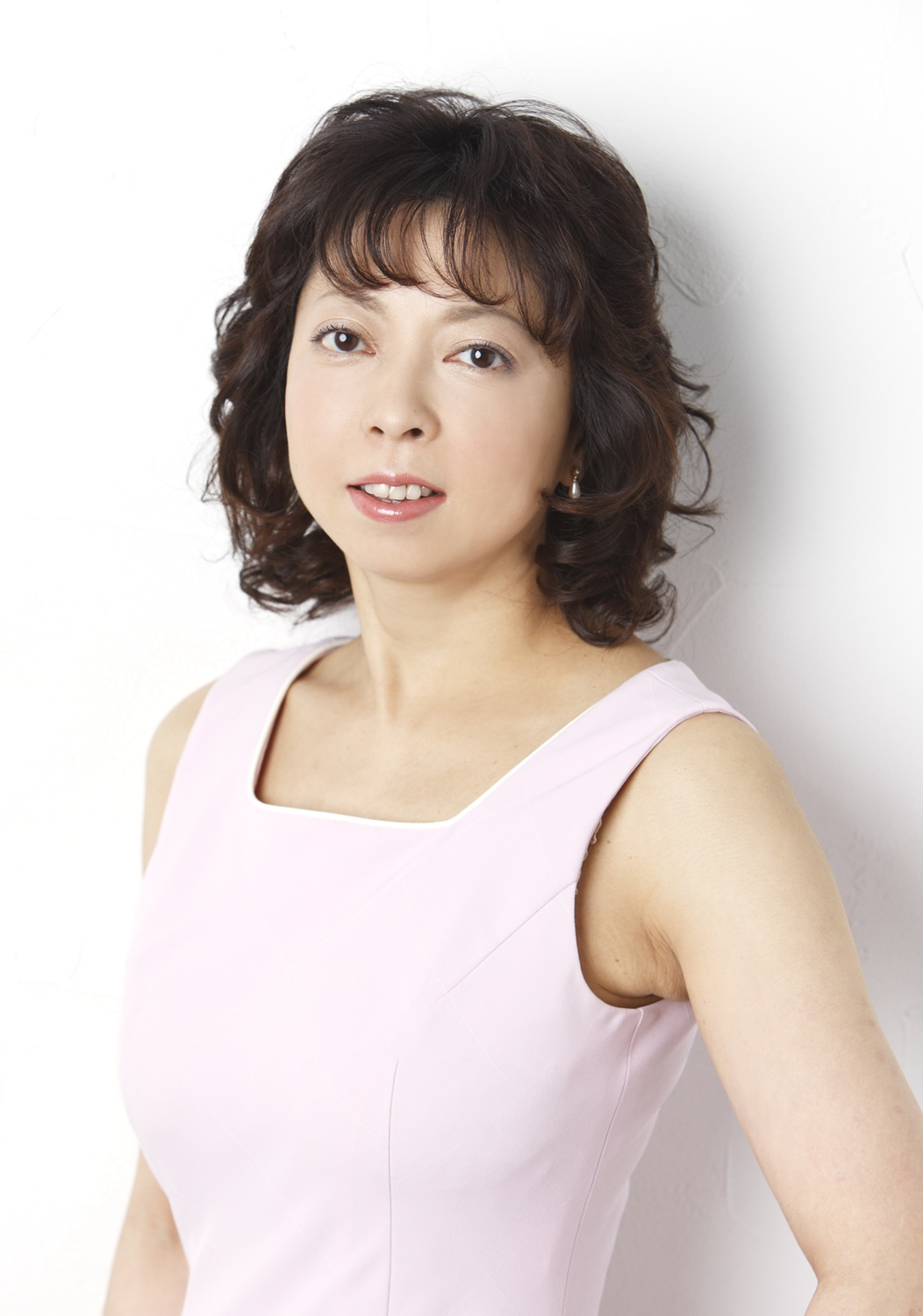
Mari Takano

Mari Takano (たかの 舞俐, Takano Mari; born before 1979 in Tokyo, Japan) is a Japanese composer, pianist, essayist, and teacher. Takano's work, and musical voice, has been recognized as among the most distinctive to be found amid Japanese composers of the "post-Takemitsu generation".

== Education ==
Takano completed four years of music instruction at the Toho Gakuen School of Music in her native Tokyo, including a composition course with Mutsuo Shishido and, in 1983, lessons with Yoriaki Matsudaira and Jo Kondo. From 1983, Takano began to study in Germany with Brian Ferneyhough at the Musikhochschule Freiburg (Freiburg University of Music), and in 1986 Takano had private lessons with Morton Feldman. After taking her diploma in Freiburg, Takano enrolled in the Hochschule für Musik und Theater (University of Music and Theatre, Hamburg) with György Ligeti, continuing there until 1994; she was awarded her MA under Ligeti in 1989. Takano's initial reputation in Europe was made while she served as pianist, keyboard player and composer with the contemporary music ensemble Hamburg Consort—later Chaosma—in which she participated with fellow Ligeti students Manfred Stahnke, Hans Peter Reutter, Hubertus Dreyer and Sid Corbett.

== Career ==
Takano resettled in Japan permanently in 1994, and since then Takano has taught at the Shobi Conservatory in Tokyo, the Toho Gakuen School of Music and, from 2004, at the Joshibi Daigaku. Takano has also conducted, and participated in, music courses in the United States, including a master class given at New York University at the invitation of Julia Wolfe in 2009.

Takano credits Ligeti with helping to find her personal sense of direction as a composer. Another important proponent of Takano's work is BIS Records' head Robert von Bahr, who issued her first album, Women's Paradise, and commissioned her to write a concerto for flautist Sharon Bezaly. She has had works commissioned by the city of Hamburg (1993, 1995), the twelfth Interlink Festival Tokyo (1995) and the Kanagawa Arts Festival (1997) (for singer Barbara Hendricks). Several Takano premieres have been held in the United States, including Full Moon (2009) for New York-based violinist Mari Kimura and LigAlien IV (2010) for the Northshore Saxophone Trio, based at Northwestern University in Chicago. Takano has also created works to commissions from mandolinist Akihiro Fukaya, Koto player Teiko Kikuchi, Hichiriki player Hitomi Nakamura, saxophonist Masahito Sugihara and pianist Ellen Ugelvik.

== Discography ==
- Mari Takano: Women's Paradise, BIS CD 1238
- Sharon Bézaly: Spellbound, BIS CD 1649

== Awards ==
- The IRINO PRIZE for Duende (1984)
- The Stuttgart Composition Prize for Kokai (1985)
- Ancona International Composition Competition first prize for Liebeslieder (1986)

== Works ==
=== Stage works ===
- Women's Paradise, abstract opera for mezzo-soprano, female choir, 3 saxes, 3 synthesizers or samplers & viola (1991)
- The Snow Queen, chamber opera (in progress, 1992 to present) various sections performed as separate works; "Flower Aria" (1993/1997), "Crow Scene" (1993/1995) and Act II, Scenes 1–5 (1995)
- Beautiful Mythology of Japan (incidental music) for violin & piano (2007)

=== Orchestral works ===
- Kokai for piano & orchestra (1984)
- Flute Concerto for flute & strings (2006)

=== Chamber works ===
- Duende, for flute, clarinet, T-bells, vibraphone & violin (1982)
- Felicitas, for 15 instruments (1984)
- Liebeslieder for flute solo (1985)
- Kreislauf, for percussion quartet (1985)
- Octet for 2 flutes, 2 oboes, 2 clarinets & 2 bassoons (1986)
- Four Pieces for Six Players for 3 winds, trombone, piano & percussion (1987)
- Are you going with me? [first version] for vibraphone & piano (1987)
- Are you going with me? [second version] for 2 guitars (1987)
- Zauberspiegel for oboe & piano (or synthesizer) (1988)
- Casablanca for sax, synthesizer, viola & double bass [first version] or sax, 2 synthesizers & viola [second version] (1989)
- L'Abandon for 14 guitars (1992)
- Octet in Two Movements, for clarinet, horn, guitar, piano, 2 percussionists, violin & double bass (1993)
- Snow Shadow; The Crow and the Jelly Fish for guitar, harp, percussion & rebab (1989)
- Mugen No Tsuki; Mugen No Hoshi for koto, 17-string koto, sho, hichiriki & violin (1998)
- String Quartet (1999)
- Song of the Pig-Mary (Paradox Love Song) for 6 harmonicas (2000)
- Moon Cherry for shakuhachi, koto & 17-string koto (2000)
- Silent Light for mandolin & harpsichord (2001)
- Two Pieces for Two Mandolins (2002)
- LigAlien I for soprano sax, tenor sax & piano (2003)
- LigAlien II for hichiriki, 17-string koto & violin (2003)
- LigAlien III for violin & harp (2007)
- LigAlien IV for Soprano sax, tenor sax & piano (2008)
- LigAlien X for shakuhachi, piano, violin & cello (2010)

=== Vocal music ===
- Drei Stücke für Stimmen for tenor, mixed chorus, 2 recorders & 2 percussionists or for tenor & mixed chorus (1987)
- Two Chansons for soprano & piano (1997)

=== Piano music ===
- Innocent (2000)
- Jungibility (2006)
- We Will Meet Again (2009)

=== Electronic music ===
- L'Abandon [first version] for guitar & electronics (1992)
- L'Abandon [second version] for synthesizer & MIDI (1992)
- Full Moon, for violin & electronics (2009)

== Additional sources ==
- Mari Takano: Liner Notes, "Women's Paradise," BIS CD 1238
- Mari Takano, Bericht zu meiner Arbeit, in Manfred Stahnke: Microtones and More; On György Ligetis Hamburg Paths (2005) pp. 333–342.
- Stephen Long: Japanese Composers Of the Post-Takemitsu generation. Speed Vol. 58 (2004), Cambridge University press. P. 14-22.
- Jean Vermeil. Mari Takano. Repertoire, May 2003 (French)
- Lutz Lesle. Mari Takano: Women's Paradise. New Magazine for Music, July/August 2003, p. 76
- Uncle Dave Lewis, review of "Women's Paradise," All Music Guide
- MUGI Bio: Mari Takano (in German)
