= Mandolin orchestra =

Orchestra with instruments from the mandolin family

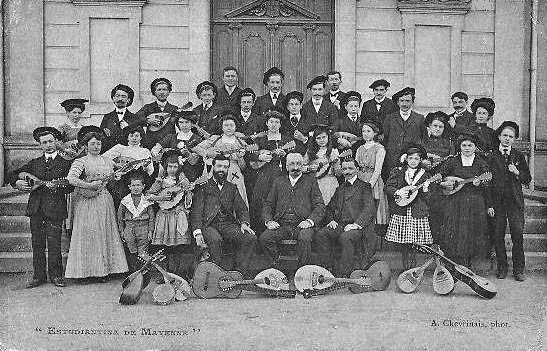
The Mandolin "Estudiantina" of Mayenne, France around 1900 when Mandolin orchestras were at the height of their popularity

A mandolin orchestra is an orchestra consisting primarily of instruments from the mandolin family of instruments, such as the mandolin, mandola, mandocello and mandobass or mandolone. Some mandolin orchestras use guitars and double-basses instead of, or as well as, the lower mandolin-family instruments.

== Orchestra composition ==
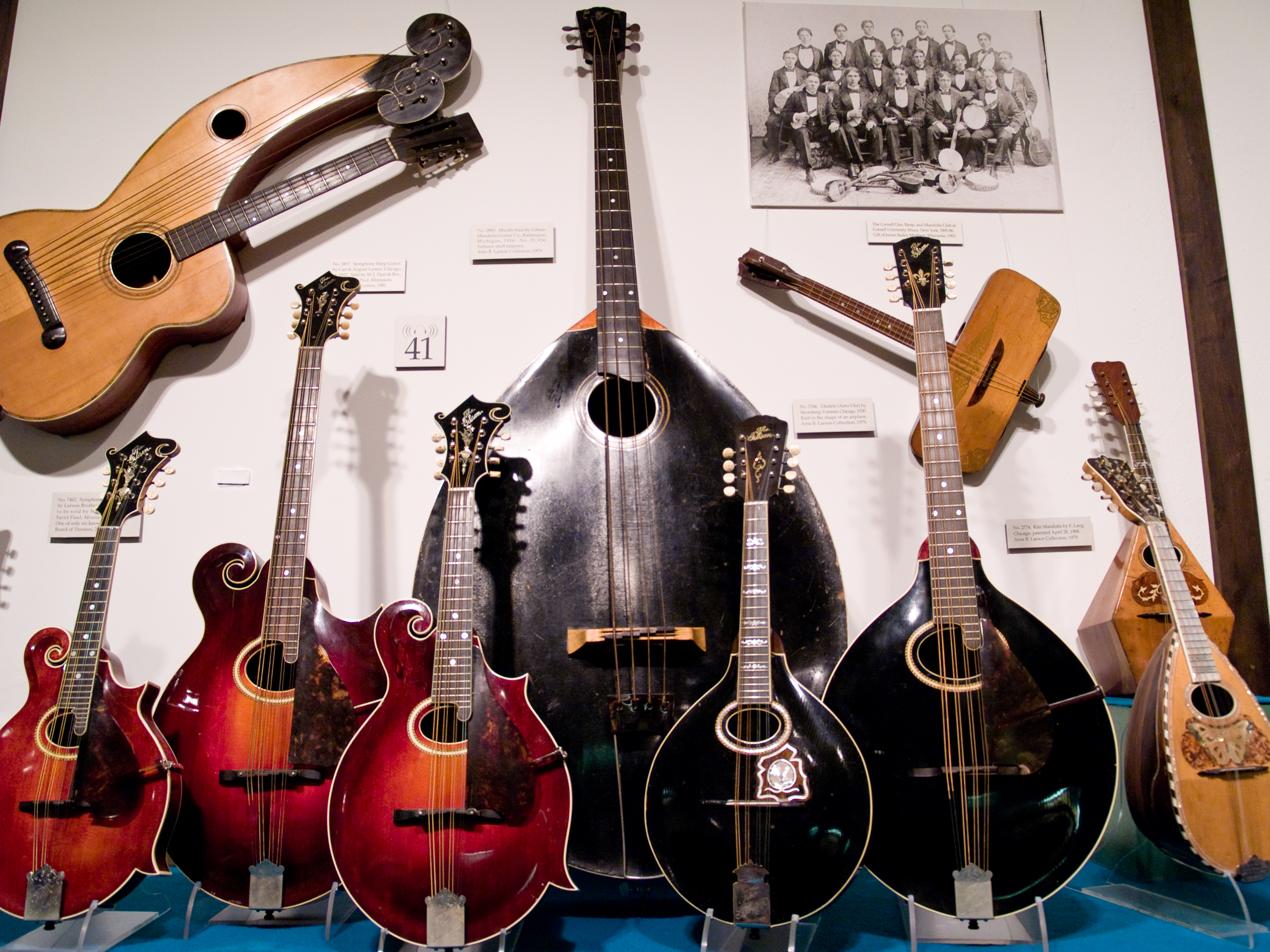
Instruments of the mandolin family, all built by Gibson.

A mandolin orchestra is an ensemble of plucked string instruments similar in structure to the string sections of a symphony orchestra. There are first and second mandolin sections (analogous to first and second violins); a mandola section (analogous to the viola section); mandocelli (analogous to the violoncelli), classical guitars, and a bass section originally of mando-basses but nowadays more likely to be acoustic bass guitar or double bass.

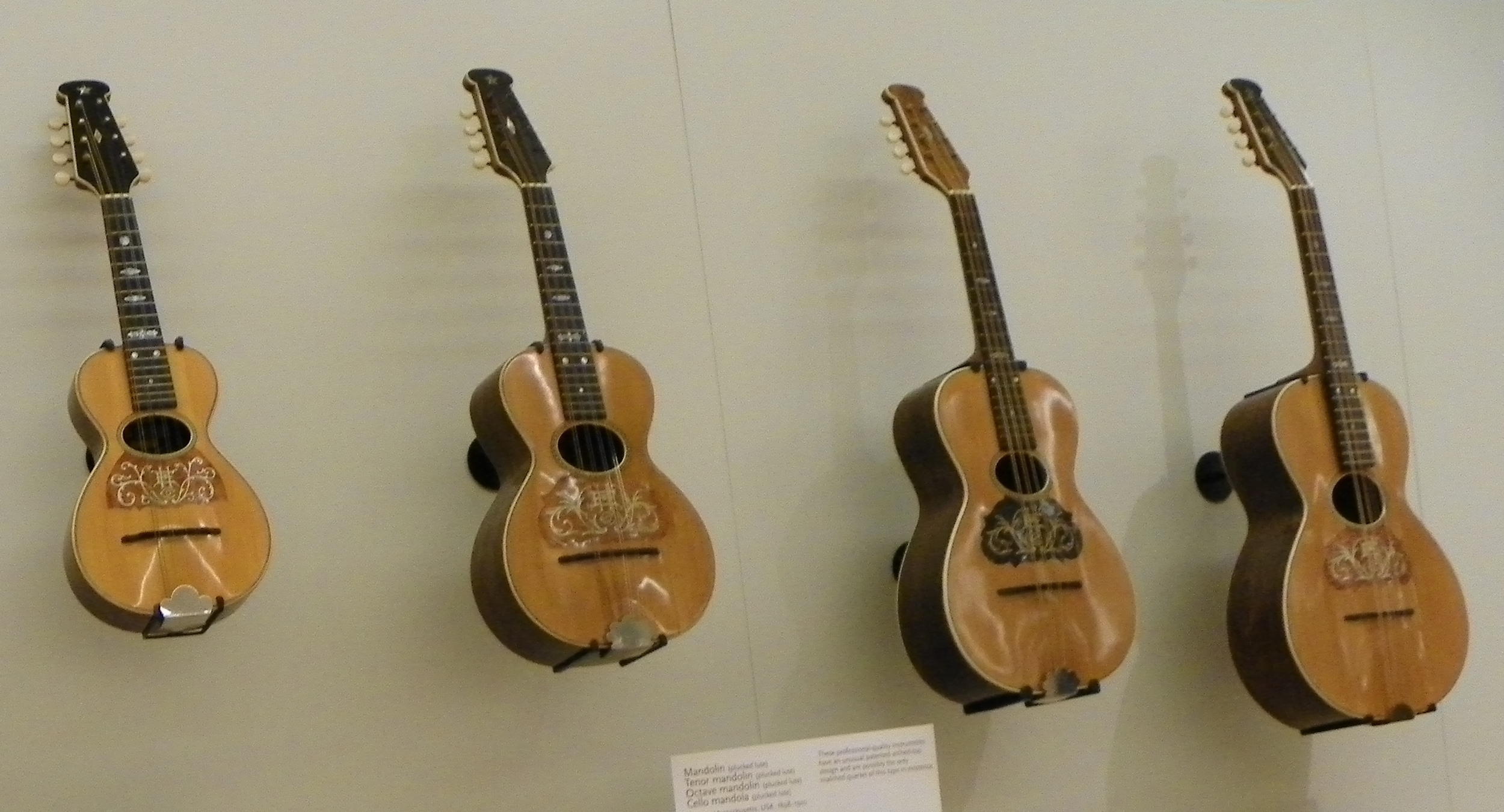
A manufacturer's idea which didn't take over, the mandolinetto or guitar-shaped mandolin by Howe-Orme. Pictured are a mandolin, tenor mandolin, octave mandolin, and cello mandola.

The classical guitar section is very important and many orchestras are more accurately described as mandolin and guitar orchestras. Many orchestras also include a percussion section.

Most mandolin orchestras are community-based and are supported by a core of professional musicians and teachers with a passion for plucked string instruments and music. They are found in nearly all major cities in the western world, as well as Japan, Korea, and South America.

== History ==
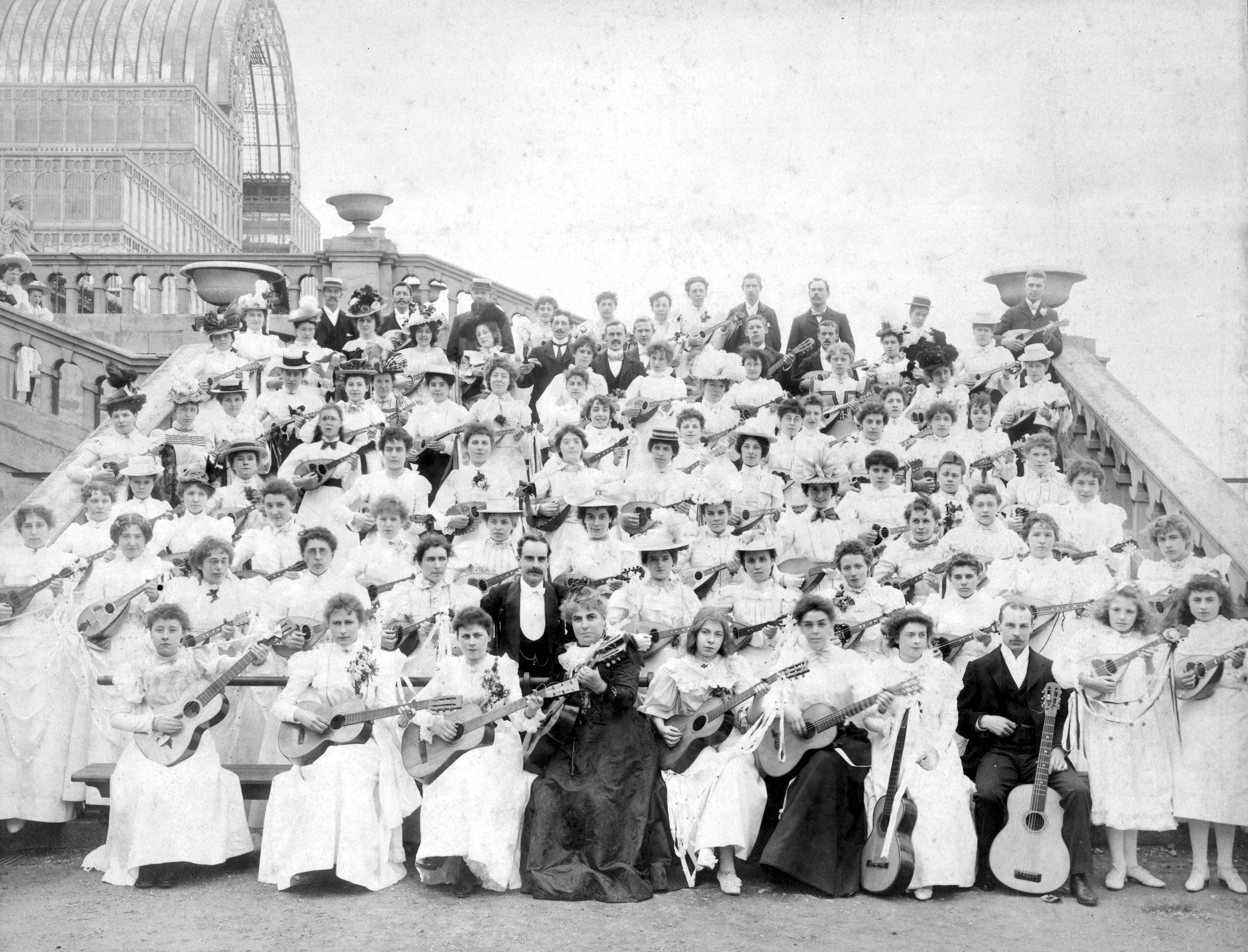
Mandolin orchestra at The Crystal Palace, 1899

The stimulus to create mandolin groups often came from travelling mandolinists and teachers. Immigration from Europe to other parts of the world resulted in the concept spreading rapidly, with movements beginning quite early in the US, Japan and Australia. Some indication of the speed of these developments across the globe can be appreciated by the following:

- The first German mandolin clubs formed in the 1890s, at first completely dependent on Italian music.
- In January 1913, the German magazine "Die moderne Hausmusik" reports 200 mandolin clubs of mandolin and guitar players in northern Germany.
- The 1899 Banjo, Mandolin and Guitar Music Festival held in Philadelphia, USA lists a festival orchestra of 130 members comprising 43 mandolinists and featured the American mandolinist Joseph Edward Pettine.
- The third Banjo, Mandolin & Guitar Festival was held in Sydney, Australia on 27 August 1896, organised by Walter Stent - the word "mandolin" appearing in the title for the first time.
- In Sydney, Australia Walter Stent was "active in the early part of the century (i.e. very early 1900s) and organised possibly the first Mandolin Orchestra."
- In 1918 the Gisborne Mandolin Orchestra was formed in Gisborne, New Zealand by George Moore (1883–1962) and wife Barbara (1885–1963).

On reviewing the S.S. Stewart's "Banjo and Guitar Journal", later called "Banjo, Guitar and Mandolin Journal", between 1884 and 1900 one comes to a view, at least in the US and Australia, that mandolin ensemble playing evolved within the banjo movement, eventually replacing it as the better ensemble instrument.

Mandolin orchestras were popular in the early 20th century, and many cities and schools had one.

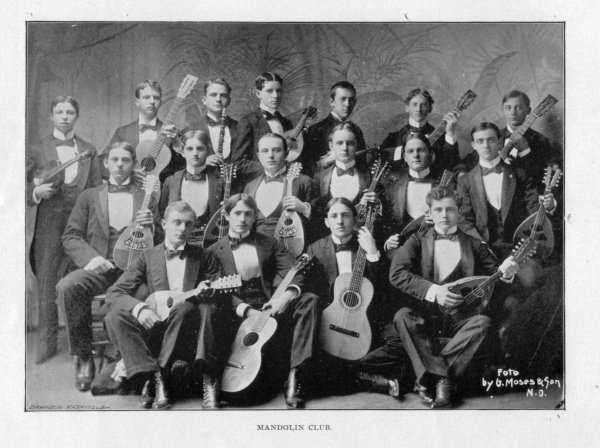
Tulane Mandolin Club in New Orleans, 1896

A considerable body of music was created, much of which was simple or popular marches and foxtrots that were easy and fun to play. However, some "serious" music was also created and which requires every bit as much skill to play as anything in the more well-known violin repertoire. Principal among the important composers of such music were Raffaele Calace, Arrigo Cappelletti, Giuseppe Manente and Carlo Munier, who all wrote beautiful and virtuosic music for various mandolin chamber music ensembles (mandolin and guitar, two mandolins and mandola, etc. as well as full orchestras).

After World War I, the mandolin orchestras went into a period of decline in the US. Orchestras continued to exist in Japan, and Germany where they are known as Zupforchester, and also in Italy.

In Canada, new mandolin orchestras were organized in Toronto, Winnipeg and other cities by left-wing immigrants from Eastern Europe. Frequently performing in labour halls, these groups were sometimes under government scrutiny, suspected of spreading socialist propaganda. Children's orchestras were also formed in Ukrainian communities.

The New York Mandolin Orchestra continued to perform during World War II.

Interest in the mandolin was renewed as a part of the resurgent interest in folk music in the late 1950s and 1960s. As this music began to be re-discovered, orchestras began to form anew in large cities in the US.

In the modern era, many cities in the US host mandolin orchestras of many years experience; many have libraries of hundreds of compositions. Significant new music continues to be written all over the world by composers including Victor Kioulaphides, John Craton, Annette Kruisbrink, Clarice Assad, Francine Trester and Jeff Hijlkema.

== Works for mandolin orchestra ==
Composer	Title	Publisher
Clarice Assad	Song for My Father (2004)	Trekel
Betty Beath	Lament for Kosovo	
Bernard van Beurden (b. 1933)	Le silence du moment (2003)	
Cesar Bresgen (1913-1988)	Tanzstücke (1967)	Breitkopf & Härtel
Cesar Bresgen (1913-1988)	Turkmenische Suite (1968)	Breitkopf & Härtel
John Craton	The Legend of Princess Noccalula	
John Craton	Danseries Anciennes	
Philip Dewalt	Zephyrisms (2010)	Trekel
Hans Gál (1890-1987)	Biedermeiertänze, op. 66 (1954)	Trekel
Hans Gál (1890-1987)	Capriccio (1948)	Trekel
Hans Gál (1890-1987)	Sinfonietta No. 1, op. 81 (1961)	Trekel
Hans Gál (1890-1987)	Sinfonietta No. 2, op. 86 (1966)	Trekel
John Goodin (1951-2001)	Another Late Spring in Iowa (2004)	
John Goodin (1951-2001)	Bethlehem On the Ohio (2007)	
John Goodin (1951-2001)	Cathedral Hill (2001)	
John Goodin (1951-2001)	Heavens On Earth: New Harmony, Equity, Shakertown (1994)	Trekel
John Goodin (1951-2001)	Last Call at Hawley-Cooke (2008)	
John Goodin (1951-2001)	The Louisville Suite: Up River Road, Cave Hill, Locust Grove (1990)	Trekel
John Goodin (1951-2001)	Smitten (2006)	
John Goodin (1951-2001)	The Waltz Lesson (2008)	
John Goodin (1951-2001)	Wedding March Set (2007)	
Bruce Graybill (b. 1956)	The Walnut Valley Suite (three movements) 1999	Mando Kinetics
Bruce Graybill (b. 1956)	The Wake	
Bruce Graybill (b. 1956)	Ritual Dance	
Bruce Graybill (b. 1956)	The Procession	
Owen Hartford	Family Squabble (2000)	
Jeff Hijlkema (b. 1971)	Perpetua Melomania	
Joel R. Hobbs (b. 1963)	In Memory of Nell Wilson Pond (2012)	Hyoshi
Joel R. Hobbs (b. 1963)	Memories from the Future (2015)	Creative Commons
James J. Kellaris (b. 1956)	Au Café Cardamome (2022)	
James J. Kellaris (b. 1956)	Emozione Chelate (2017)	
James J. Kellaris (b. 1956)	Philoxenia (2016)	
James J. Kellaris (b. 1956)	Persephonia II (2015)	Trekel
James J. Kellaris (b. 1956)	Persephonia (2014)	
James J. Kellaris (b. 1956)	Chrysopylae Reflections (2012)	
James J. Kellaris (b. 1956)	Kalamazoo Suite (2010)	
Kalamazoo Swag (2009)	Trekel	
Victor Kioulaphides (b. 1961)	Concerto per orchestra a pizzico	
Victor Kioulaphides (b. 1961)	Sinfonia a pizzico	
Victor Kioulaphides (b. 1961)	Broadway `79 2 mandolins and mandolin orchestra	
Barbara Kolb (b. 1939)	Aubade (2003)	Boosey & Hawkes
Annette Kruisbrink (b 1958)	Dreamtime (1997)	Vogt & Fritz
Annette Kruisbrink (b 1958)	Gone with the Wind (1999)	Vogt & Fritz
Yasuo Kuwahara (1946-2003)	Song of the Japanese Autumn	
Chiel Meijering (b. 1954)	Spötterdämmerung (1997)	Donemus
Dimitri Nicolau (1946-2008)	Dances & Melodies, op. 125	Trekel
Dimitri Nicolau (1946-2008)	In Memoriam a S. Behrend, op. 102	Trekel
Francine Trester	Three Movements for Mandolin Orchestra (2006)	

== See also ==
- Classical Mandolin Society of America
- Fretworks Mandolin and Guitar Orchestra
