= Bernardo De Pace =

Italian opera singer

Bernardo De Pace Bernardo Di Pace
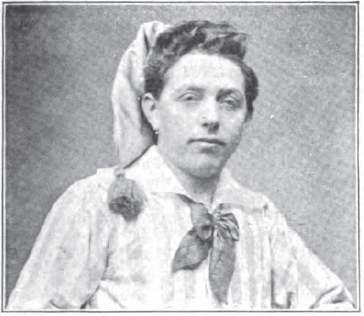
- De Pace in 1919 from Music Trades magazine

Background information
- Born: March 31, 1881; San Ferdinando di Puglia of the Province of Foggia or Foggia
- Died: June 15, 1966 (aged 85) Brooklyn, New York, U.S.
- Genres: classical, opera, vaudeville
- Occupations: musician, actor
- Instrument: mandolin
- Years active: 1899 – c. 1959
- Labels: Columbia, Pathé Frères, Actuelle, Victor, Metro-Movietone, Vitaphone
- Formerly of: De Pace Opera Company; De Pace Sextet; De Pace Brothers; Les Marchantes

Bernardo De Pace (March 31, 1881 – June 15, 1966) was an actor, musician and comedic vaudeville entertainer of the 1910s and 1920s, billed as "the Wizard of the Mandolin". He learned to play mandolin in the Italian tradition under Francesco Della Rosa. De Pace's repertoire and technique was described in the Brooklyn Life as involving "the most difficult violin and piano compositions, executed at inconceivably rapid tempi demanding an uncanny technique seldom heard on fretted instruments". In 1927 the Minneapolis Star said that he had been recognized as one of the best mandolinists in the United States. It added that he was more than a mandolinist, that his skill was in playing on human emotions as few musicians were able.

Growing up in the Golden Age of the Mandolin, he was one of its star performers in both Europe and the United States. De Pace won an international mandolin contest at an early age, and as his grandson Bobby De Pace later put it, "From 11 to 17, he played for kings and queens." He worked in England for nearly 10 years, starting in 1900, playing with the Blackpool Winter Gardens' Orchestra for 3 seasons and touring the country for nearly 7 seasons with his brother Nicolas, until 1909 when they emigrated to the United States from Italy.

By 1921 he had toured extensively both as a musician and a vaudeville performer. For many years, De Pace was mandolin soloist at the Metropolitan Opera in addition to his turns on the vaudeville stage. His talents were also recorded in the newly emerging film industry; his camp performance style is captured in a Warner Bros. Vitaphone short from 1927 (Bernado [sic] de Pace: The Wizard of the Mandolin) which was released on DVD in 2007 as part of The Jazz Singer deluxe edition, and two MGM shorts from 1929. He also released a series of recordings ranging from light classical pieces to original compositions in traditional Italian style.

== European tours ==
Bernardo moved to Naples with his family when he was two. He began to play the mandolin at five years of age and it became his passion "to the exclusion of all else". He has been credited with having for teachers both Luigi Della Rosa (violin) and Francesco Della Rosa (violin and mandolin). He impressed Luigi with his musical aptitude and received lessons for free, but when it was apparent that he was more interested in the mandolin, to the disgust of his teacher, the lessons ended. This would have been in the 1890s, when the mandolin was the instrument of the moment, worldwide. The two instruments (which are tuned the same and of similar size) are similar enough for Bernardo to have applied his educated understanding of the violin to the mandolin. His other teacher, Francesco, was a mandolinist who ran in the same artistic circle as Raffaele Calace and Nicole Calace in Naples.

Bernardo won an international competition for mandolin players in Europe in 1899. Born in 1881, he would have been 18. He then won similar contests of musical skill in Naples, Paris, London, Berlin, and St. Petersburg. He impressed the Sultan of Turkey (in Paris) and performed before Emperor Franz Joseph of Austria-Hungary, Kaiser Wilhelm II in Berlin and Czar Nicholas II of Russia in St. Petersburg. Bernardo and his brother Nicola toured in England for nearly a decade and then emigrated to the United States in August 1909.

== De Pace brothers in America ==
=== De Pace Opera Company ===
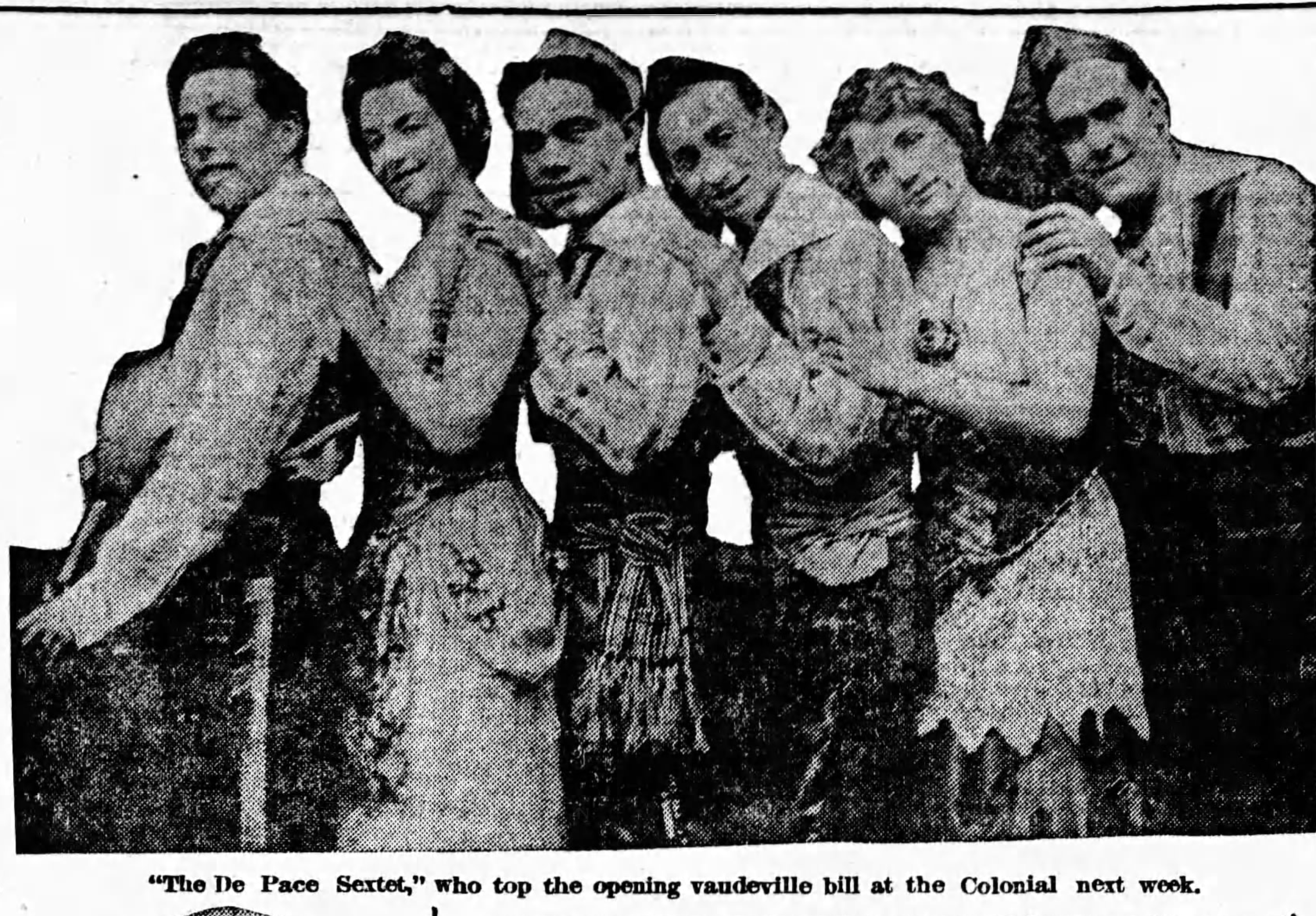
De Pace Sextet, 1916, from the Akron Beacon Journal. From the left Bernardo De Pace, Adeline Dossena, next three unknown. The last man may be Nicolas De Pace, Bernardo's brother.

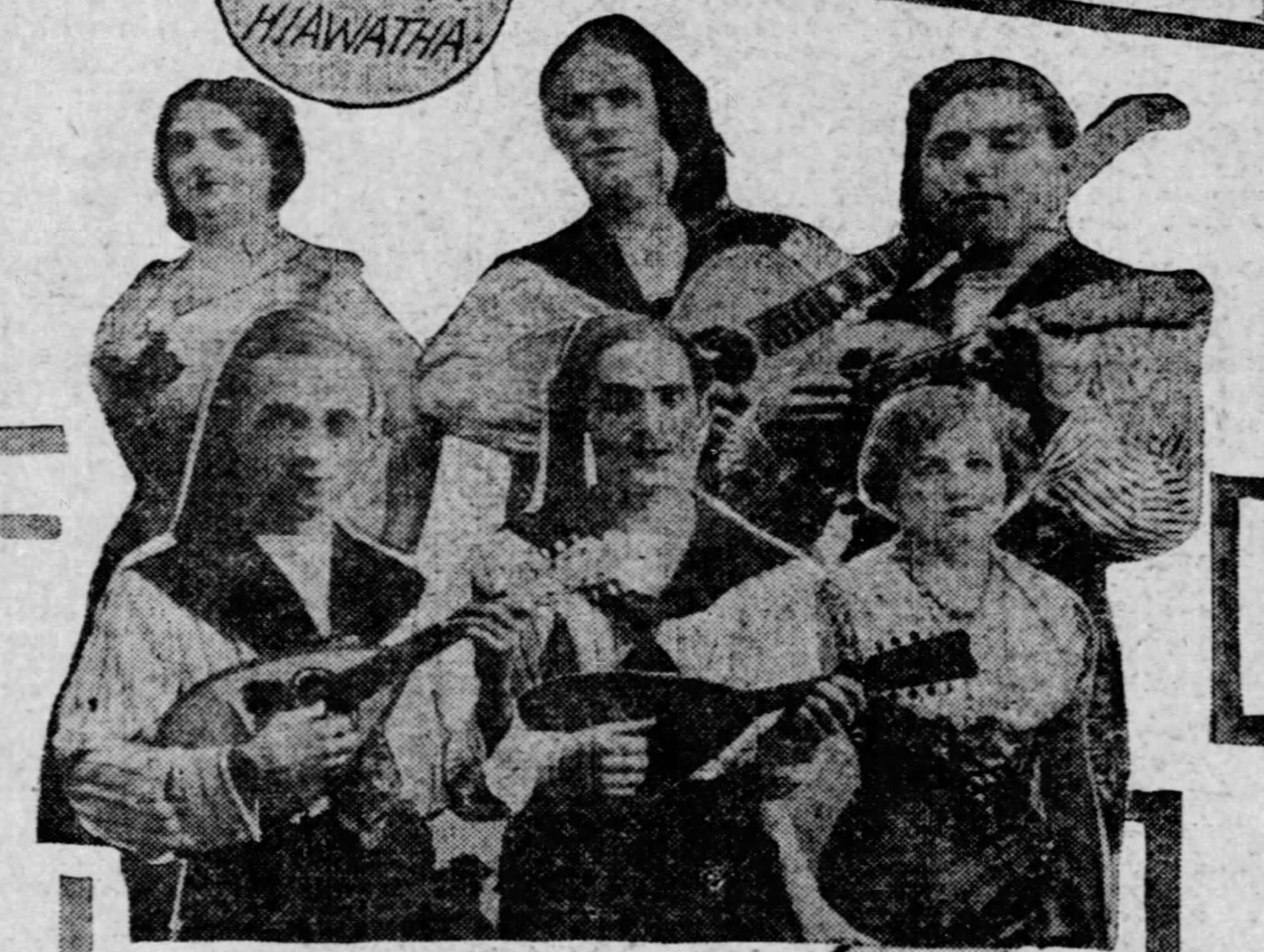
The De Pace Opera Company in 1914. The article text said they had seven in their group, but only six were in the photograph. Back row: Adelina Dossena, Nicolas (with guitar) and Bernardo (mandolin)

After arriving in the United States, August 27, 1909, Bernardo and his older brother Nicholas began touring performances. A newspaper clipping from Washington, D.C. in May 1910 calls their act the De Pace Brothers. At first they worked as instrumental performers, doing guitar and mandolin instrumentals.

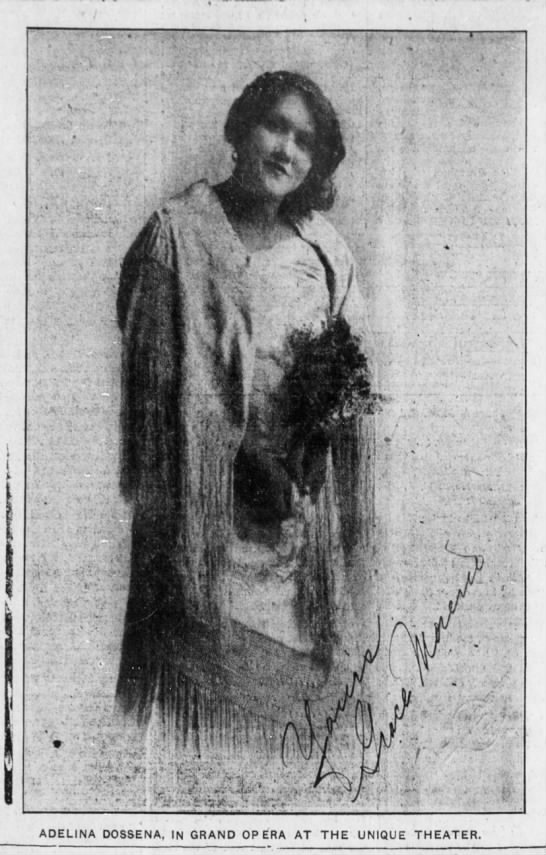
Adeline Dossena, an Italian opera singer who was credited in American newspapers as having sung in La Scala opera house in Milan. From San Bernardino Daily Sun, 1913. She appeared with the De Pace brothers in acts from 1914 through 1919.

Beginning in 1914 they performed under the name De Pace Opera Company, a cast of 6 or 7 accomplished singers, whose performance included instrumentals and vocal numbers. Their lead singer was the soprano Adeline Dossena, who had performed at the La Scala theater in Milan. Both brothers sang in operatic style as well as played their instruments. The opera company gave condensed performances of popular operas. The Atlanta Constitution gave a description of their show in 1917, saying, "Their repertoire includes arias from the greatest operas ever written and are signalized because they differ from the regulation so-called "classic song" that one usually hears nowadays on the stage. Besides being singers of attainment, each member of the company is an expert instrumentalist, their selections on the mandolin and guitar being equally as credible as their singing." They were also billed the De Pace Sextet, playing classical and popular selections. In Akron the group was labeled one of the most "finished groups" to have performed there.

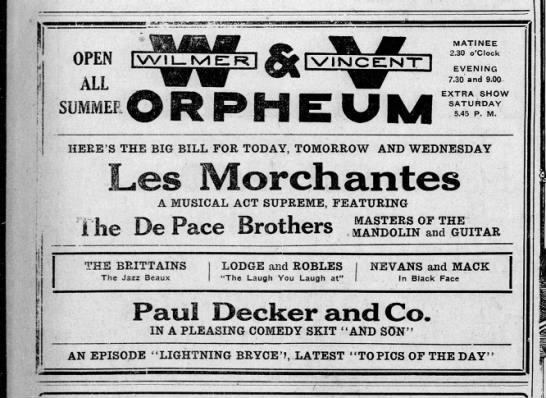
Les Morchantes in Allentown, Pennsylvania, April 1920

=== Transition to separate careers ===
In 1920 the brothers performed under the name Les Marchantes, still playing mandolin and guitar. This group also had two female performers, who sang and played instruments. Sometime between 1920 and 1930, the brothers began to perform separately. By 1930, Nicolas was living in Queens, working as a musician in a theater. Bernardo began to branch out into other performance venues. In 1931, he gave a performance over the Blue radio network.

De Pace performing in The Wizard of the Mandolin, a 1927 Vitaphone Variety

He also branched into the movie and recording industry, doing work for Vitaphone in 1927 and Metro-Movietone in 1929. With Vitaphone, Bernardo performed in a short film called The Wizard of the Mandolin on April 4, 1927. The films of the time were silent films, but Vitaphone tried to change that by synchronizing a recording to play while the silent movie rolled. De Pace was the subject of the short film, and his music was recorded live, even as the 35mm was being exposed. The short film was also known as Bernardo De Pace in the Wizard of the Mandolin Plays Morning, Noon, and Night in Vienna.

In the film, De Pace was dressed as a clown or Pierrot. As he played, he used exaggerated facial expressions as part of his Pierrot pantomime-act. He used similar "contortions" in his live acts as well. A reviewer for the Des Moines Register saw the performance in 1925, two years before it was filmed. Seeing it on stage, he found the combination of music and comedy effective, saying, "In an effective frame he appears as a Pierrot with a mandolin which cries, laughs, and talks under his skillful fingers. His music is worth going far to hear." The music he played in the short was Morning, noon and night in Vienna, That's why I love you, Tarentella, and a medley of Souvenir (from The Tales of Hoffmann) and Humoresque.

Films of Bernardo De Pace showed variations on his act with the clown costume as late as 1935, when his performance with the Andrini Brothers was briefly reviewed in Minneapolis. The performers were wearing white chalk makeup and Pagliacci costumes. The act, which had been popular enough that it played around the country and as far away as Australia for almost ten years was wearing thin by 1935. The Minneapolis Star Tribune commented then that the group "clowned feebly" and "raised no blood pressure." De Pace didn't face a decline of popularity alone; Vaudeville itself was on the decline. Bernardo was successful enough, however that he remained in the field as late as 1940, calling himself a vaudeville actor in the U.S. census. However, his work may no longer have been steady, as he was 59 and had only worked a few weeks the previous year.

Less work in Vaudeville didn't mean retirement for Bernardo, whose talent allowed his move onto a more prestigious stage, the Metropolitan Opera in New York. In a 1946 news article, De Pace was named responsible for supplying fretted instrument players to the opera, when such were needed, himself playing the mandolin. Artists he worked with include Enrico Caruso, Mario Lanza and Ezio Pinza.

== Compositions ==
His composed works were characterized my music historian Paul Sparks as pieces in the Italian traditions he grew up with and light classical music, although he did write some serious works, including a mandolin concerto.

- 1920 (Sept 14) Just for another day with you, words by W. A. Edwards, music by Bernardo De Pace
- 1920 (Sept 21) Little Joe, words by W. A. Edwards, music by Bernardo De Pace
- 1920 (Sept 14) You remind me of someone I knew, words by W. A. Edwards, music by Bernardo De Pace
- 1920 (Oct 28) Hairy (the) Toupee of the Laddie O'Lea, words by W. A. Edwards, music by Bernardo De Pace
- 1921 (June 10) Neapolitan Mazurka
- 1921 (June 10) Red Devil Polka No. 1
- 1921 (June 10) Serenata
- 1921 (June 10) Valse Modern
- 1921 (Dec 28) Marcia America
- 1921 (Dec 28) Re-Union Waltz
- 1924 You're never going to fool me again, words by Fanny Watson, music by Fanny Watson and Bernardo De Pace
- 1926 (Jan 8) Capricciosa tarentella
- 1928 (Feb 1) Take and Give: foxtrot
- 1951 (Feb 27) Bouquet of Flowers mandolin solo
- 1951 (Feb 27) Dearest Mandolin scherzo mandolin
- 1951 (Feb 27) Nocturne mandolin and guitar
- 1951 (Feb 27) Serenade mandolin and guitar
- 1951 (Feb 27) Sonatina 2 mandolins and guitar no. 1
- 1951 (Feb 27) La Torre (The Tower) mandolin solo
- 1958 (Dec 5) Just Washed My Hair, words Teresa Dirska, music Bernardo De Pace
- 1959 (Oct 19), You're not the girl for me, words Nick De Pace, music Bernardo De Pace

== Discography ==
=== Audio recordings ===
Bernardo Di Pace and his brother Nicholas Di Pace performed on records sold by Columbia, Pathé Frères, Actuelle (another label of Pathé Frères) and Victor. Fratelli De Pace is Italian for the De Pace brothers. Nicholas was called Nino on the Columbia records. When they played together, Bernardo played his mandolin and Nicolas, the guitar.

==== Columbia Records ====
- 1917 – Di Pace brothers, Berceuse (from Jocelyn by Godard)
- 1917 – Di Pace brothers, Humoreske (Dvořák)

==== Pathé Frères phonography ====
- Neapolitan Mazurka (De Pace)
- Valse Moderne (De Pace)

==== Actuelle ====
- 1921 – De Pace brothers, Three O'Clock in the Morning, waltz, by Dorothy Terriss and Julián Robledo
- 1921 – Moon River, waltz, by Lee David (1891–1978)

==== Victor Records ====
- 1924 – Bernardo De Pace, Hungarian lustspiel
- 1924 – Bernardo De Pace, Neapolitan mazurka
- 1924 – Fratelli De Pace, Mazurka napoletana
- 1924 – Bernardo De Pace, Diavoli rossi polka
- 1924 – Fratelli De Pace, Serenata espanola
- 1924 – Fratelli De Pace, La Paloma
- 1924 – Bernardo De Pace, William Montague, Harry Lauder, Love makes the world a merry-go-round
- 1927 – Bernardo De Pace, La capricciosa
- 1927 – Bernardo De Pace, Souvenir, barcarolle, humoresque
- 1927 – Bernardo De Pace, Mattino, pomeriggio e sera a Vienna
- 1927 – Bernardo De Pace, Neapolitan caprice
- 1928 – Bernardo De Pace and Nicola De Pace, Meditation
- 1928 – Bernardo De Pace and Nicola De Pace, Take and give
- 1928 – Bernardo De Pace and Nicola De Pace, The bridal rose : Overture
- 1928 – Bernardo De Pace and Nicola De Pace, Silver bells

=== Vitaphone ===
- Bernardo De Pace, The Wizard of the Mandolin Plays Morning, Noon and Night in Vienna (Warner Brothers, 1927)
- Bernardo De Pace, The Wizard of the Mandolin Plays Caprice Viennois (and Others) (MGM, 1929)
- Bernardo De Pace, The Wizard of the Mandolin Plays Thaïs (and Others), (MGM, 1929)
