= Elias Howe Company =

American musical firm

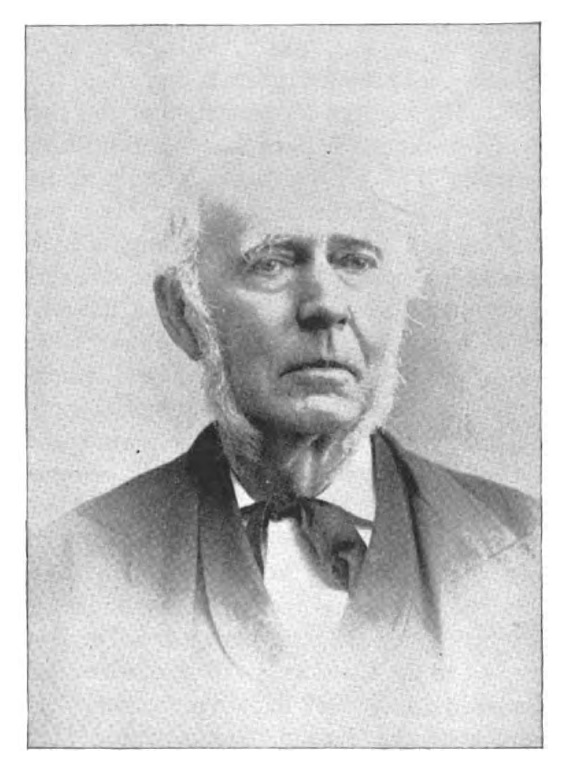
Elias Howe, Jr., published 1892 in "Boston of Today".

The Elias Howe Company was a 19th and early 20th century musical firm located in Boston, USA and founded by Elias Howe, Jr. (1820–1895). His company was successful, selling more than a million copies of his music instruction books by 1892. Howe was cousin to the inventor of the sewing machine and related to Julia Ward Howe, composer of The Battle Hymn of the Republic.

== The development of the company during Howe's lifetime ==
Howe acquired a fiddle as a young boy and soon learned to play, working his way through tunes that he heard. He couldn't afford to buy the expensive sheet music of his day, but his ear was good enough for him to write down tunes that he heard other New England fiddlers play. He put together a book of tunes in this manner, while still young.

Civil War era book of military-inspired music, including military calls, marches and dances, published in 1863 by Elias Howe.

=== Musical publications ===
Howe eventually acquired a substantial collection of these tunes and managed to get them published in book form in 1840 as The Musician's Companion. He was unable to pay all at once for the 500 copies that printer Wright & Kidder agreed to print for him, but bought copies as he was able. The books were successful, and he sold enough of them, door-to-door and city-to-city, to open his own shop in 1842.

By 1850, Howe had published several other volumes of tune collections and musical instruction. In about that year, he sold his rights to those works to the Oliver Ditson Company of Boston and agreed to desist from publishing music for a period of 10 years, buying land in South Framingham and managing the South Reading Ice Company. He returned to publishing in about 1861 after the term of the agreement with Ditson had elapsed and became one of the country's most prolific musical publishers. By his own estimate, he compiled and published about 200 "musical works", under his own name, and using the pseudonyms "Gumbo Chaff," "Patrick O'Flanigan," and "Mary O'Neill."

=== Musical instruments ===
Sky notes that during the American Civil War, Howe expanded his activities to include manufacturing drums for Massachusetts regiments. He was offered the position of Director of Bands for the United States Army, and the rank of Lt. Colonel, by President Lincoln. He chose instead to continue manufacturing drums and fifes and publishing books on their use in marching bands.

=== Location of the Company ===
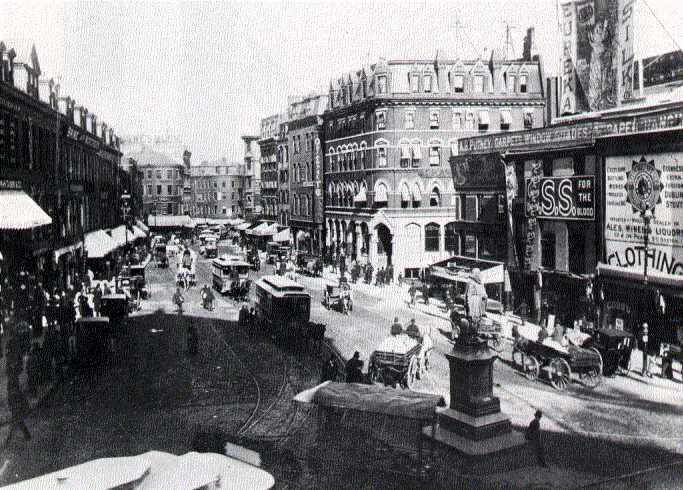
Barely visible, silhouetted against the sky at the far end of the square, at the left, is the "Howe's Music" sign of the Elias Howe Company

The Elias Howe Company for many years was located at 88 Court Street in Boston and many of the volumes of sheet music and instrumental instruction that the company produced bear that address. Archival photos of the Scollay Square area of Boston dating from the 1880s often show the "Howe's Music" sign silhouetted against the sky above the buildings at the end of Court Street.

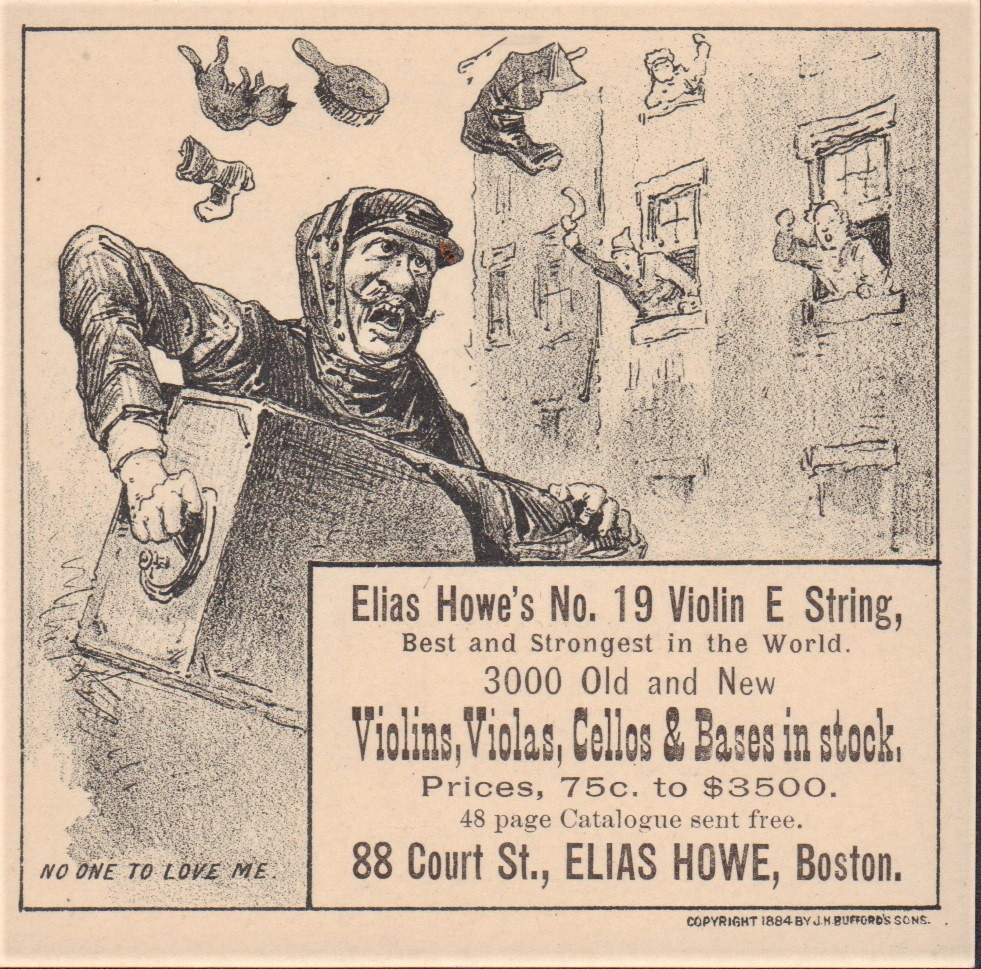
19th Century Trade Card - Boston, MA, Musical Instruments, Sheet Music, Instrument Parts

== The Company after Howe's death ==
Although company letterhead states that the firm was founded in 1840 (when Elias Howe, Jr. first published his fiddle tune collection), it was not formally incorporated until 1898, three years after the death of its founder. The principals at that time were Elias's sons Willam H. and Edward F. Howe, who served as president and treasurer, respectively. Their sister Harriet Howe was the company bookkeeper. The company expanded its operations considerably and became a full-service music store, offering several different types of musical instrument, parts for instruments, and, of course, an extensive catalog of musical publications. It has not been proven whether the company made their own instruments or contracted with local companies to build them. Whether they made the instruments or not, they did handle tonewood and were described as a large importer of the wood.

The company later relocated to 8 Bosworth Street in Boston, a few blocks from its earlier Court Street address. From the Bosworth Street location, the Elias Howe Company issued an extensively illustrated 97-page catalog.

Howe-Orme pick guard

Although most of the goods for offer were related to violin-family instruments, the catalog also includes lines of guitars and mandolins. Of particular note are the Howe-Orme guitars and mandolins. These were highly innovative instruments that as early as 1897 incorporated novel features that eventually found their way into the designs of American instruments that followed. The mandolins featured an elaborate "E H Co" monogram inlaid in ivory-colored plastic into the instruments' tortoise pick guards. That logo may be among the most enduring visual reminders of the company. Ironically, it did not appear until two years after Elias Howe's death.

The Elias Howe Company closed its doors in the 1930s. Many of the music collections and instruments the company supplied to the nation remain in active use and are valued to this day.

== Howe-Orme brand ==
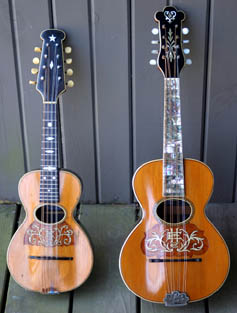
Howe-Ormes mandolin and mandola

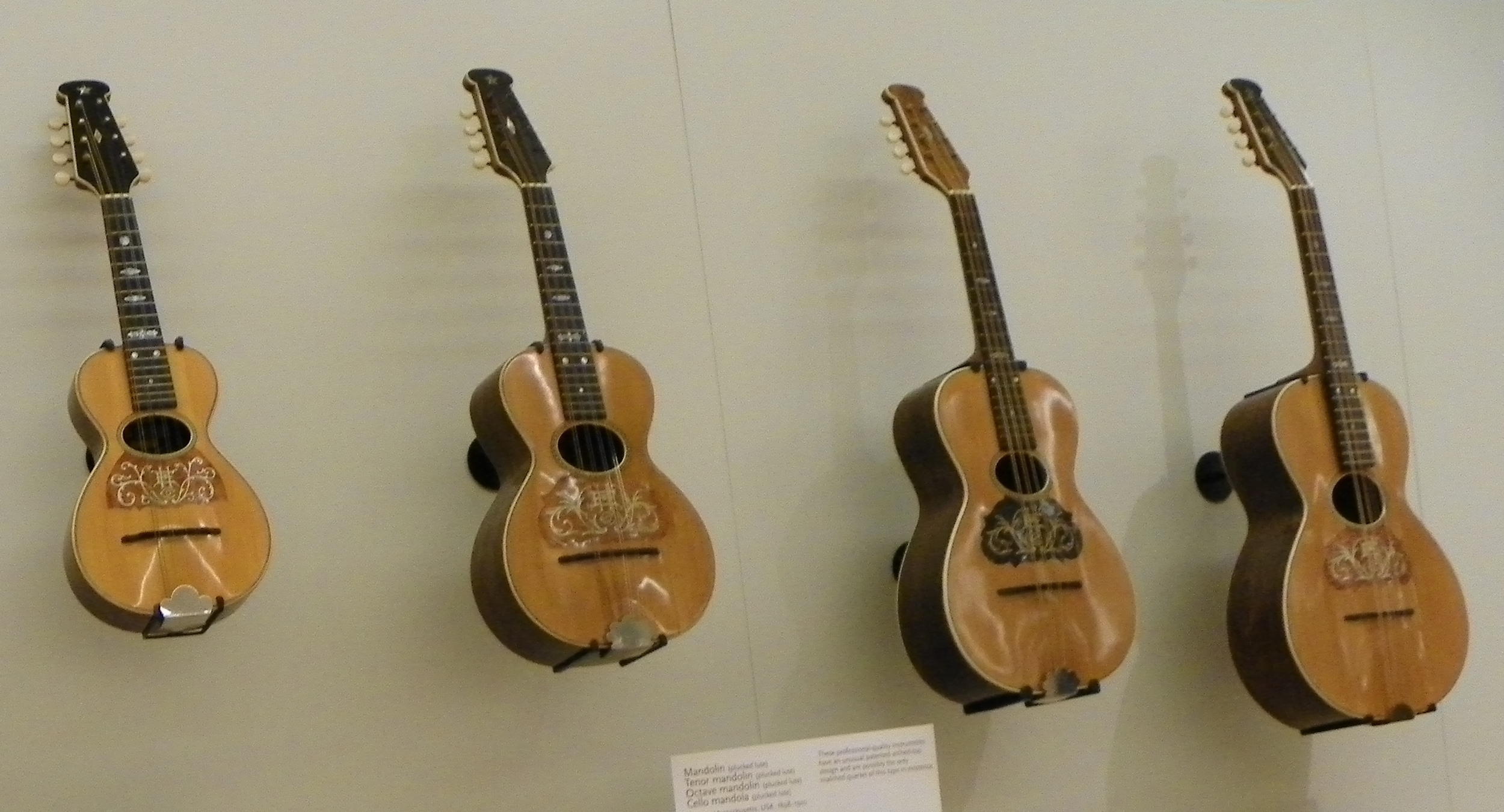
From the left are a Howe-Orme mandolin, tenor mandolin, octave mandolin and cello mandola.

Howe-Orme mandolinettos

The Howe-Orme name arises from the association of the younger Howes (William H. and Edward F. Howe) of Boston with George L. Orme of Ottawa, Ontario, Canada. A May 1896 newspaper article announced a deal between Orme & Son and the Elias Howe Company for the United States manufacturing rights (on a royalty basis) for "the celebrated Orme guitar and lute banjo.

G. L. Orme was the younger partner in J. L. Orme & Son, a company founded by his father, James L. Orme. J. L. Orme & Son was a retailer of musical instruments, primarily pianos and organs, and a publisher of sheet music. They also had a musical instrument factory for their violins and guitars over their piano "wareroom". Like Elias Howe, Jr., J. L. Orme was deceased by the time that the Howe-Orme instruments appeared and his son, George, ran the company.

George Orme was an associate of James S. Back, with whom he shared patent rights to the musical instrument design that became the hallmark of Howe-Orme instruments. This design, first described in an 1893 patent (U. S. Patent No. 508858) awarded to Back with half-ownership assigned to Orme. The critical feature described in the patent is a "raised longitudinal belly ridge" extending along the top of the instrument, under the strings, from the end of the fingerboard to the tailpiece. The innovation is depicted on a guitar in the patent application but the patent text makes mention of its applicability to other stringed instruments. A subsequent design patent (U. S. Patent No. D27560) shows the concept applied to a guitar-shaped mandolin. That patent was awarded to Edward F. Howe on August 24, 1897.

=== Instruments ===
The Howe-Orme instrument line comprises several models of guitar and an entire line of mandolin-family instruments including mandolin, tenor mandola, octave mandola, and mando-cello. Howe-Orme instruments were among the first to be produced in the United States in multiple sizes analogous to the members of the violin family. These mandolin-family instruments are unique not only because of the "raised longitudinal belly ridge" but because they are shaped like guitars and have absolutely flat backs. Although guitar-shaped mandolins were subsequently manufactured by other firms, an Elias Howe Company catalog from approximately 1910 notes that the Howe-Orme mandolins were the first such instruments. The catalog also points out the ease of holding a guitar-shaped instrument in contrast to the awkwardness of the bowl-back mandolins of that era.

The guitars had another unique feature in addition to the longitudinal ridge: their necks were easily detachable and their angle could be adjusted without any disassembly. The neck design, like the longitudinal ridge, originated with J. S. Back and is described most fully in U. S. Patent No. 538205, issued to Back, with half-ownership to G. L. Orme, in April, 1895.

Examples of a guitar-shaped mandolin made solely by J. L. Orme company are very rare; after discovering one, a collector called his "the missing link" between the Canadian company and its patents and the variety of "Howe-Orme" instruments made by The Elias Howe Company. Although the J.L. Orme Company made the guitar-shaped mandolin in Canada, advertisements from the company focus on their guitars and their lute-banjos. The J. L. Orme & Son "Lute-Banjo" had a rounded, fat, oval body, with a neck held on by three screws (making the angle adjustable).

The (U.S. based) Elias Howe Company's "Howe-Orme" instruments had bodies shaped like guitars, with (at least for the mandolins) necks that were glued to the bodies with a dove-tail joint.

The patents covered a wide variety of instruments, being used to create guitars, mandolins and lute-banjos. What the two companies' instruments shared was the patented arched soundboard. Opinions by collectors have indicated that the Elias Howe instruments had a pressed soundboard, which kept its shape with internal braces. The Howe-Orme guitar also shared the adjustable neck system.
