= Giuseppe Branzoli =

Italian composer

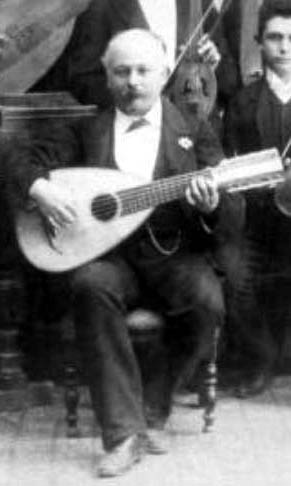
Branzoli playing a mandolone (bass mandolin) during a concert at Palazzo Doria-Pamphili of Rome, 24 May 1889

Giuseppe Branzoli (1835 in Cento – 21 January 1909, in Rome) was a violinist, mandolinist, composer, author, educator at the Liceo Musicale di St. Cecilia in Rome, and the founder of the periodical IL mandolin Romano. His compositions were for violin, mandolin, flute and cello, as well as church music.

He taught at Cento and Bologna and played first violin at the Theatre of Apollo Orchestra in Rome. Also played in the Theatre of Massimo in Rome. After his son died and he used music as a way to "stifle and conquer his grief". He taught as a professor of stringed instruments at the college level and worked as a conductor of the Philharmonic Society. He also helped found the Liceo Musicale di St. Cecilia in Rome and taught as a professor of harmony there and worked as a librarian.

== Compositions ==
He composed for the mandolin band. He also did operas, Torquato Tasso and Sorrento which were successful. Wrote an elegy for orchestra, A tear over the tome of Meyerbeer.

- Une Larme sur la tombe de Gaetano Donizdth. Elegie pour violon avec accompagnement de piano par Giuseppe Branzole. Op. 51 (A Tear at the tomb of Gaetano Donizdth. Elegie for violin with piano accompaniment by Giuseppe Branzole. Op 51)
- Le mariage polka pour piano op. 53 (Marriage polka for piano op. 53)
- Rimembranze soave: (facili). (Sweet remembrances: (easy))
- Margherita Polka

== Books and periodical ==
Cover of one of the 1909 issues of Ill Mandolino Romano, published by Carlo Munier. Magazine was founded by Branzoli.

While in Rome, he devoted himself to historical musical research, with Professor Rodolfo Berwin. He also founded the periodical Ill mandolino Romano in an effort to advance the mandolin and guitar. The publication ran from 15 January 1907 until two years after his death in 1909.

He wrote the instruction book, A Theoretical and practical method for the mandolin, a two volume set published in 1875 by Franchi, in French and English. Each book in the set contained progressive studies, sonatas and duos for two mandolins. The method won first prize at the International Musical Exhibition in Bologna in 1888. Two years later he revised the set, and won at the Palace of Industry Exhibition in Paris. He also wrote methods for the guitar and the lute, with history and illustrations.

- The lute and its story
- Historical handbook for violinists
- Historical and practical method for the lute (pub 1891 by Venturini in Florence) contains illustration of lute made by Stradivarius in 1700
- Theoretical and practical method for the mandolin
- Ricerche sullo studio del liuto (Research on the study of the lute)
- Delle' Udito schediasmi musicali; conferenza tenuta in Bologna nella sala dei Fiorentini la sera del 5. Marzo 1891

== See also ==
- List of mandolinists (sorted)
