= Andrini Brothers =

Italian American musicians

Frank Andrini
- Born: July 14, 1906; Livorno, Italy
- Died: August 23, 1969 (aged 63) California
- Occupations: Musician, composer
- Instruments: Liuto cantabile, Guitar, Harp guitar, Tenor banjo
- Years active: c. 1915-1969

Lawrence Andrini
- Born: April 8, 1908; Livorno, Italy
- Died: April 1, 1974 (aged 65) San Francisco, California
- Occupations: Musician, composer
- Instrument: Mandolin
- Years active: c. 1915-1974

The Andrini Brothers were an Italian American musical outfit playing classical, opera, and ballo liscio music.

== Bibliography ==
Andrini, Frank, & Andrini Lawrence. Mills mandolin solos. With guitar accompaniment (plectrum style) As specially arranged and featured by Frank and Lawrence Andrini. New York, NY: Mills Music, Inc., 1923.
