= Mandolone =

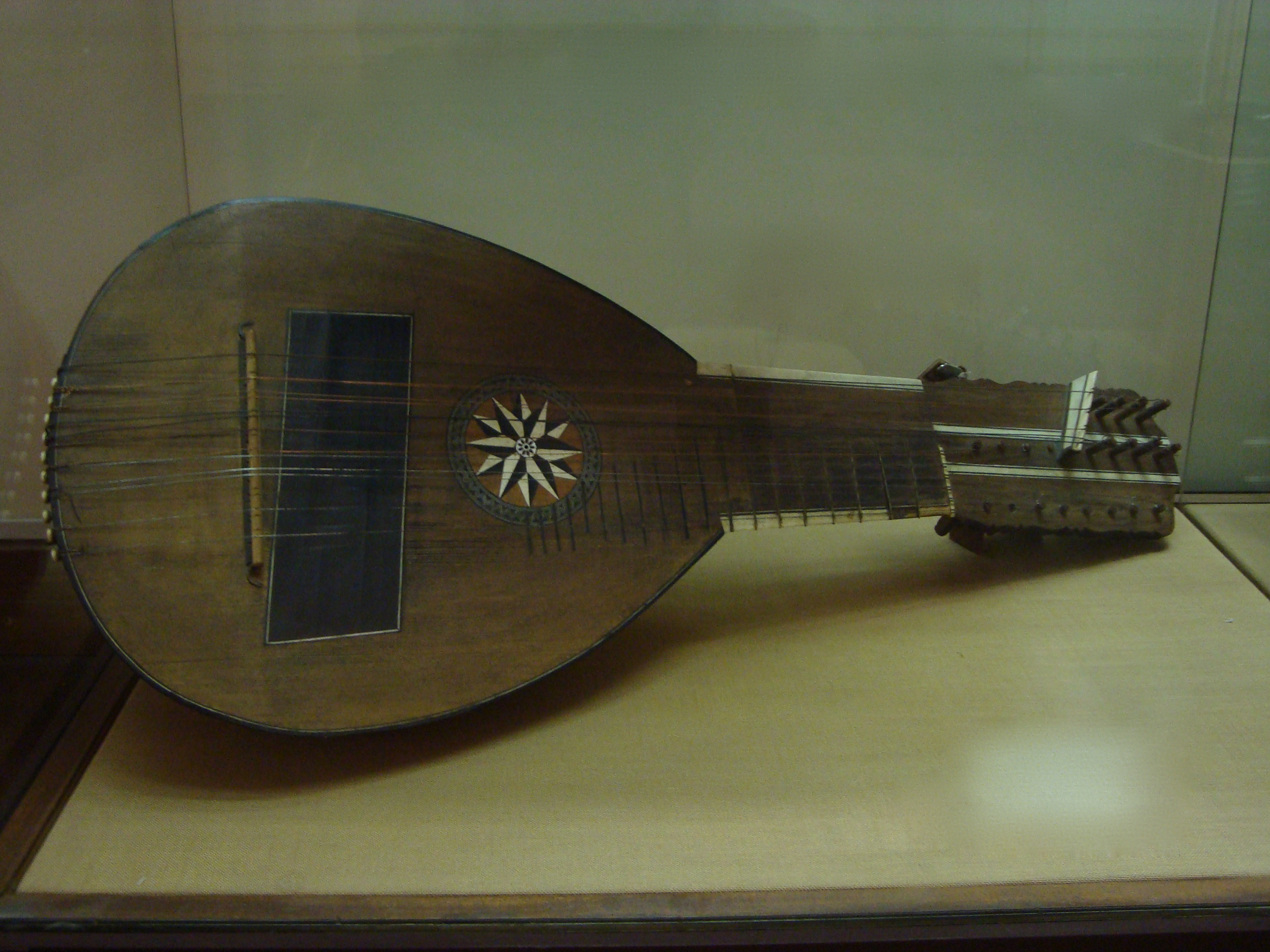
- 19th–century mandolone exhibited at the Musical Instrument Museum of Rome, Italy
- Classification: String instrument (plucked)
- Hornbostel–Sachs classification: 321.322 (Composite chordophone)
- Developed: 18th century

Related instruments
- List: Mandobass; Mandolin

A mandolone is a member of the mandolin family, created in the 18th century. It is a bass range version of the Neapolitan mandolin. Its range was not as good as the mandocello, which replaced it in mandolin orchestras, and had largely disappeared in the 19th century.

Besides the lesser range, compared to the mandocello, the mandolone was also a quieter instrument. This was a problem, because the other instruments making up the mandolin orchestras were getting louder. In regular orchestras, it had to be heard with violins, violas and cellos, which were getting louder as well.

== Experts unclear over definition ==
Donald Gill pointed out that there is some uncertainty as to the exact nature of the instruments or what they were tuned to. He wrote about the 1989 book that James Tyler and Paul Sparks wrote together, The Early Mandolin: the Mandolino and the Neapolitan mandolin. He quoted Paul Sparks as saying the four-course Roman mandolone was "usually referred to as a liuto." This was important because the instrument did not seem to match the music written for it, and that it is unclear whether "mandolone" refers to a large mandoline or the Roman instrument created by Gaspar Ferrari. He felt that the two authors had not addressed the instrument definitively, leaving questions of interpretation.

=== Mandolone defined ===
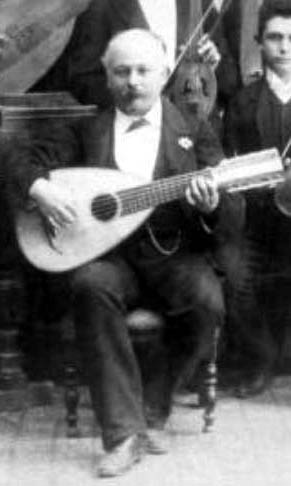
(Left): Mandolin Club of Brescia. Instruments are not named but are in the mandocello and bass ranges. Possible names for the instruments include mandolones or liuto cantabile and arciliuto or mandobasses; (right): Giuseppe Branzoli playing an instrument identified as a mandolone restrung as a 12-string guitar, 1889

In 1995 Paul Sparks released the book The Classical Mandolin. He took some pains to define and describe the liuto, mandolin and liola. He said that the liola and mandolone were the same instrument, different from the liuto. The mandolone was a flat-backed, bass instrument, "much larger than the liuto" with "four heavy wound strings" tuned (in fourths) to A-D-G-c.

The encyclopedia, Musical Instruments of the World says the mandolones existed with six to eight courses of string pairs. David Betts, who has played a mandolone for the Munier Mandolin & Guitar Orchestra in Philadelphia, said that fifths is the native tuning for the mandolone. He also said that is a likely reason for the instrument's decline. The instruments longer scale length (longer than the mandocello or liuto) makes playing the instrument difficult. He said his orchestra intends to restring their mandolone, to tune it in fourths instead (which he says is standard with bass-family, stringed instruments).

Another way of tuning the mandolone has been written about by Vincent Schisano. He indicates that a version of the instrument could have its strings tuned individually instead of in pairs, showing a tuning pattern D-E-F-B-E-G-C-F.

=== Liuto defined ===
The liuto cantabilis, a type of mandocello also known as the liuto moderno, had five courses of strings tuned in fifths to C C-G G-d d-a a-e' e'. It resembled the Neapolitan mandolin, 39 inches long with 20 frets. Its music was written in the bass clef except for solo parts which were written as for the guitar in the treble clef (but sounding an octave lower).
