= Fretworks Mandolin and Guitar Orchestra =

The brainchild of the classical guitarist and banjo and lute performer Douglas Back, Fretworks Mandolin and Guitar Orchestra was the first public-school-affiliated mandolin youth ensemble in America.

== History ==
The orchestra, based in Montgomery, Alabama, consisted of an ever morphing lineup of 13- to 18-year-olds over several years who represented the most talented musicians at the Baldwin Arts and Academic Magnet School as well as talented alumni. The ensemble utilized several unconventional instruments including the mandola, mandocello, classical banjo, tenor banjo, and octave mandolin in addition to the more conventional mandolin and classical guitar.

Due to their unique position as a one-of-a-kind ensemble and through the guidance of Back, the group achieved moderate success and notoriety in the mandolin and classical guitar worlds and regularly performed at music festivals around the country. In addition to such performances, Fretworks also recorded a total of three albums over the course of its life including El Cumbanchero, Cathedral Hill, and a self-titled CD released in 2003 featuring a suite composed by the composer John Goodin as well as a "Divertimento for Mandolin Orchestra" composed by Lynette Morse, both of which being specifically written for the group. Perhaps, however, the most notable achievement attained by the ensemble was the 2003 performance on the National Public Radio show From the Top which introduced Fretworks to a national radio audience of roughly 25 million people.

In 2006, they released a new CD, New Harmony.

== Performers ==
The lineup from the self-titled album is as follows:

1st Mandolin

- Robert Thornhill - Concertmaster
- Aaron Shows
- James Nichols

2nd Mandolin

- Morgan Dowdy - Principal
- Taylor Hall
- Joey Nelson

Mandola

- Logan Yates - Principal
- Collin Taylor
- Joey McElvy
- Wilson Franklin

Mandocello

- Collin Taylor

Guitar

- Mark Edwards - Principal
- Joel Littlepage
- Ruddy Thompson
- Scott Redding
- Travis Manuel

Plectrum Banjo

- Joey McElvy

Contrabass Guitar

- Alesia Davidson

Percussion

- Aaron Shows - Drums
- Joel Littlepage - Egg Shaker
