= Liuto cantabile =

Liuto Cantabile
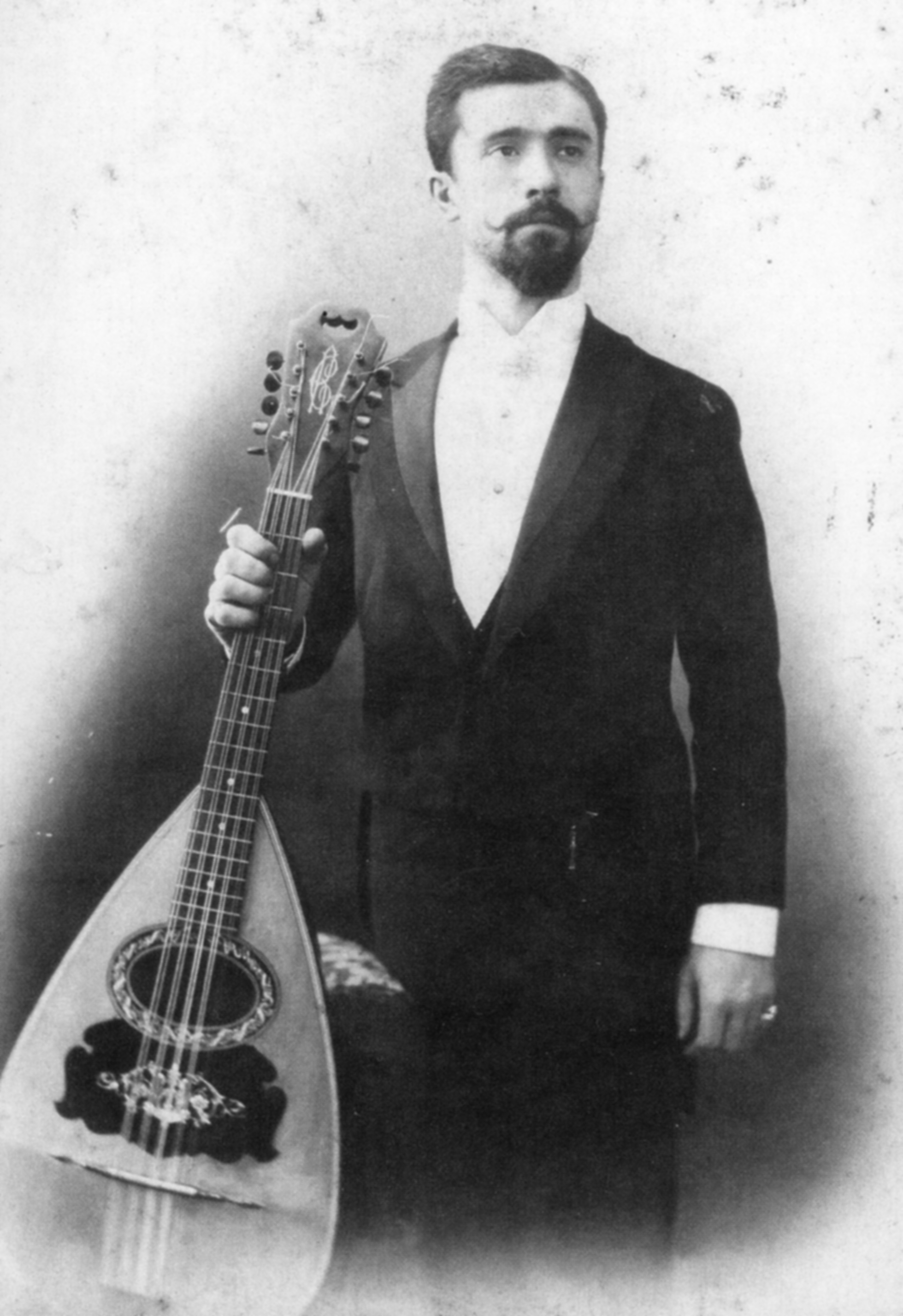
- Raffaele Calace holding a Liuto Cantabile, c. 1900. String instruments Plucked string instruments
- Other names: Liuto Moderno

Related instruments
- Family: Mandolin; Mandola; Octave mandolin; Mandocello; Mandobass

The liuto cantabile, also termed a liuto moderno, is an uncommon ten-stringed mandocello. This bass variant of the mandolin family was developed by the Neapolitan luthiers of the Vinaccia family in the late 19th century and perfected by Raffaele Calace. The scale of a modern Calace-manufactured liuto cantabile is 61 cm (24"). The instrument overlaps or is equivalent to the mandolone and mandocello.

== Tuning ==
The liuto cantabile is tuned CC-GG-dd-aa-e'e'.

== Solo repertoire ==
A substantial catalog of solo liuto works have been composed, most notably by the mandolin virtuoso, composer and luthier Raffaele Calace, who championed the instrument.

Raffaele Calace - Piccola Serenata
Piccola Serenata performed on liuto by Todd Billeci

== Ensemble repertoire ==
The instrument is also the bass member of the classical mandolin quartet, or plectrum quartet. This ensemble consists of mandolin I and II, mandola and liuto cantabile. The earliest known classical plectrum quartet with this configuration was the Florentine Quartet formed in 1890 in Florence, Italy. The regular members of this quartet were Luigi Bianchi (mandolin I), Guido Bizzari (mandolin II), Riccardo Matini (octave mandolin), and Carlo Munier (liuto cantabile, director).
