= Howe-Orme =

Instrument manufacturer in Boston, Massachusetts

Howe-Orme instruments were manufactured by the Elias Howe Company of Boston, MA. The company was founded by Elias Howe Jr. (1820–1895). Although the inventor of the sewing machine had the same name, this Elias Howe Jr. was not associated with that invention. The two men were contemporaries, lived in the same part of Massachusetts, were acquainted with one another, and according to stories passed down through family members, were not always on the best terms.

== History ==
Elias Howe Jr. from the cover of his company's music catalog.

Howe-Orme instruments made their appearance after the death of the company founder, at a time when his two sons, William H. and Edward F. Howe ran the Elias Howe Company. The Howe-Orme name arises from the association of the younger Howes with George L. Orme of Ottawa, Ontario, Canada. G. L. Orme was the younger partner in J. L. Orme & Son, a company founded by his father, James L. Orme. J. L. Orme & Son was a retailer of musical instruments, primarily pianos and organs, and a publisher of sheet music. Like Elias Howe Jr., J. L. Orme was deceased by the time that the Howe-Orme instruments appeared and his son, George, ran the company.

George Orme was an associate of James S. Back, with whom he shared patent rights to the musical instrument design that became the hallmark of Howe-Orme instruments. This design, first described in an 1893 patent (U. S. Patent No. 508858) awarded to Back with half-ownership assigned to Orme. The critical feature described in the patent is a "raised longitudinal belly ridge" extending along the top of the instrument, under the strings, from the end of the fingerboard to the tailpiece. The innovation is depicted on a guitar in the patent application but the patent text makes mention of its applicability to other stringed instruments. A subsequent design patent (U. S. Patent No. D27560) shows the concept applied to a guitar-shaped mandolin. That patent was awarded to Edward F. Howe on August 24, 1897.

=== Instruments ===
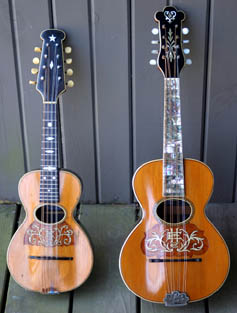
Howe-Ormes mandolin and mandola

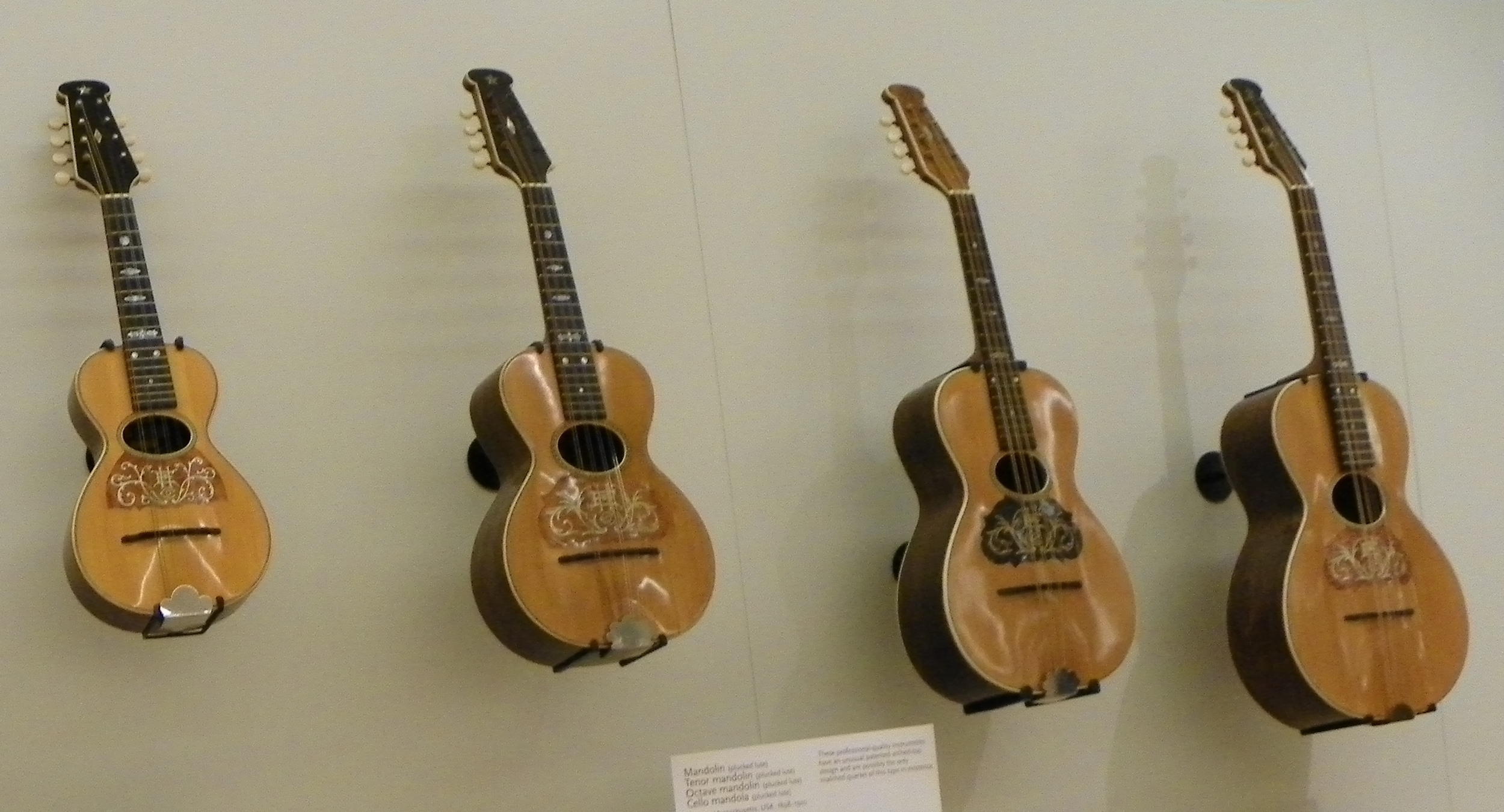
From the left are a Howe-Orme mandolin, tenor mandolin, octave mandolin and cello mandola.

Howe-Orme mandolinettos

The Howe-Orme instrument line comprises several models of guitar and an entire line of mandolin-family instruments including mandolin, tenor mandola, octave mandola, and mando-cello. Howe-Orme instruments were among the first to be produced in the United States in multiple sizes analogous to the members of the violin family. These mandolin-family instruments are unique not only because of the "raised longitudinal belly ridge" but because they are shaped like guitars and have absolutely flat backs. Although guitar-shaped mandolins were subsequently manufactured by other firms, an Elias Howe Company catalog from approximately 1910 notes that the Howe-Orme mandolins were the first such instruments. The catalog also points out the ease of holding a guitar-shaped instrument in contrast to the awkwardness of the bowl-back mandolins of that era.

The guitars had another unique feature in addition to the longitudinal ridge: their necks were easily detachable and their angle could be adjusted without any disassembly. The neck design, like the longitudinal ridge, originated with J. S. Back and is described most fully in U. S. Patent No. 538205, issued to Back, with half-ownership to G. L. Orme, in April, 1895.
