= Mandocello =

Musical instrument in the mandolin family

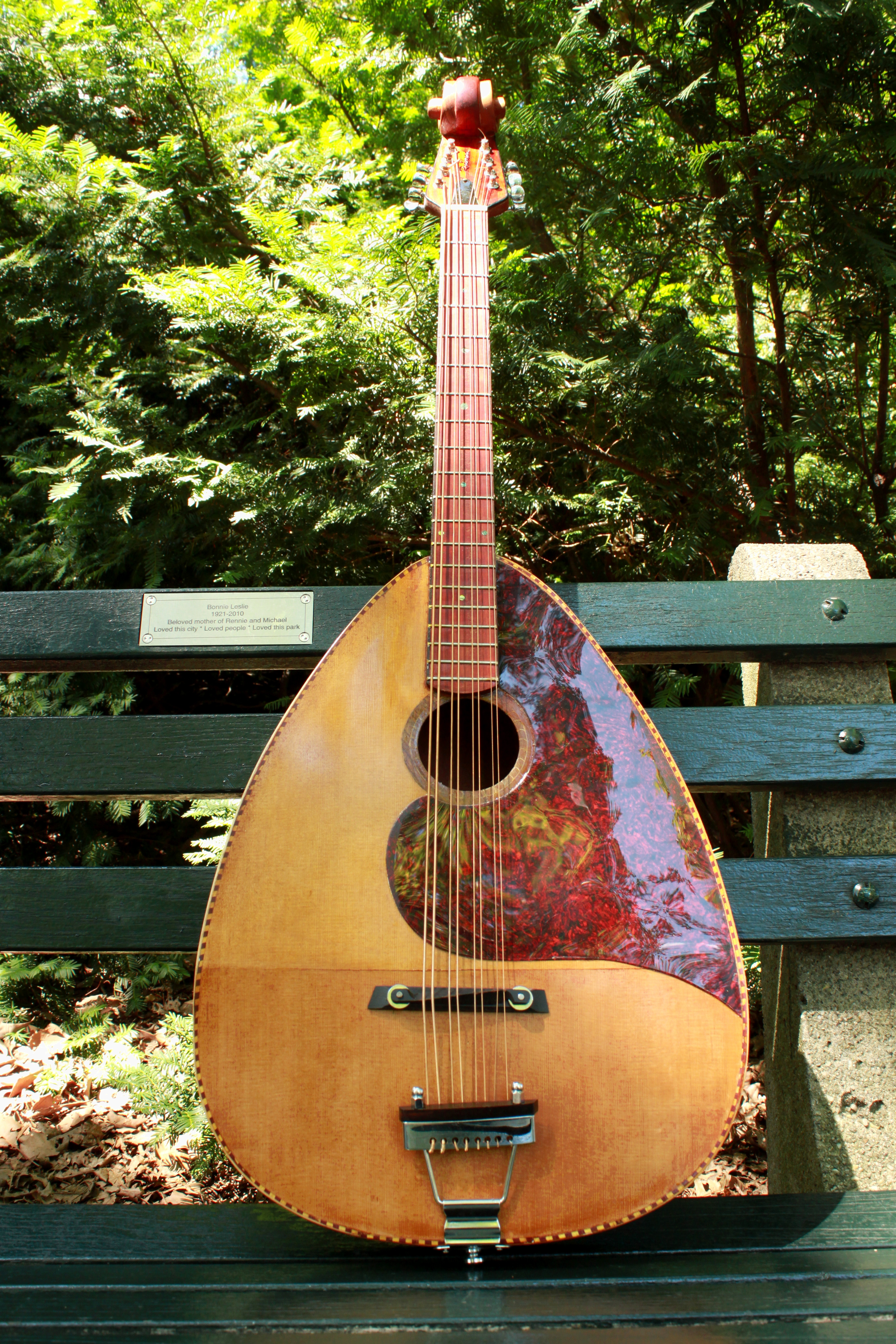
- Redhead brand mandocello
- Classification: String instrument (plucked)
- Hornbostel–Sachs classification: 321.322 (Composite chordophone)

Related instruments
- List: Family; Mandolin; Mandola; Octave mandolin; Mandocello; Mandobass; Angélique (instrument); Archlute; Barbat (lute); Bağlama; Bouzouki; Irish bouzouki; Lute; Theorbo

The mandocello (Italian: mandoloncello, Liuto cantabile, liuto moderno) is a plucked string instrument of the mandolin family. It is larger than the mandolin, and is the baritone instrument of the mandolin family. Its eight strings are in four paired courses, with the strings in each course tuned in unison. Overall tuning of the courses is in fifths like a mandolin, but beginning on bass C (C2). It can be described as being to the mandolin what the cello is to the violin.

== Construction ==
Mandocello construction is similar to the mandolin: the mandocello body may be constructed with a bowl-shaped back according to designs of the 18th-century Vinaccia school, or with a flat (arched) back according to the designs of Gibson Guitar Corporation popularized in the United States in the early 20th century. The scale of the mandocello is longer than that of the mandolin. Gibson examples have a scale length of 24.75 in (62.9 cm) but flat-back designs have appeared with both significantly shorter and longer scale lengths (27"/68.58 cm on some Vega mandocellos). Bowl-back instruments may have a shorter scale length, on the order of 22.5" (about 57 cm).

The internal bracing also bears some similarity to the mandolin. Gibson's mandocellos were typically constructed with a single transverse brace on the top just below the oval soundhole. Modern builders also use X-bracing.

As is typical of the mandolin family, mandocellos can be found with either a single oval soundhole or a pair of "F" soundholes.

These instruments typically have between 18 and 22 frets; concert bowl-back instruments may have more frets permitting virtuoso passage work in the upper register.

=== Layout of strings ===
The mandocello generally has four courses of two strings each. Because of the heavy gauge of the lowest course, some folk mandocello players remove one of the C strings to prevent rattling while playing fortissimo, or use lighter gauge strings so that the two C strings do not rattle.

There are 10-string/5-course mandocellos, containing an additional course of strings above the first (highest) course, sometimes termed a liuto cantabile or liuto moderno, although these instruments remain technically mandocellos.

== History ==
Like most other instruments in the mandolin family the mandocello originated in Europe. Mandolins evolved from the lute family in Italy during the 17th and 18th centuries, and the bowl back mandolin, produced particularly in Naples, became common in the 19th century. It was during the Baroque period (1600–1750) that interest in the mandolin began to increase, along with its use in ensemble playing, resulting in increased interest in developing and expanding the mandolin family.

The first evidence of modern metal-string mandolins is from literature regarding popular Italian players who travelled through Europe teaching and giving concerts. Notable are Signor Gabriele Leone, Giovanni Battista Gervasio, Pietro Denis, who travelled widely between 1750 and 1810. This, together with the records gleaned from the Italian Vinaccia family of luthiers in Naples, Italy, has led musicologists to believe that the family of modern steel-string mandolins were developed in Naples by the Vinaccia family.

Mandolin ensembles were popular in the late Baroque period, and a number of instruments were added to the family around this time, including the mandalone a flat-backed, bass instrument, "much larger than the liuto" with "four heavy wound strings" tuned (in fourths) to A2-D3-G3-C4. This instrument may have been the direct precursor of the mandocello. The popularity of mandolin ensembles began to wane during the late Classical (1750–1825) period, and after 1815 the mandolin largely transitioned to the status of a folk instrument, and the mandolone all but disappeared.

It was during this decline in popularity that Pasquale Vinaccia (1806–1885) made his modifications to the instrument that his family made for generations, creating the Neapolitan mandolin.

The mandolin was largely forgotten outside of Italy by that point, but the stage was set for it to become known again, starting with the Paris Exposition in 1878. Vinaccia modernized several members of the mandolin family, improving resonance, increasing ranges, and adding features. In addition to creating the Neapolitan mandolin c. 1835, he reconceived the mandalone and related instruments, which had limited range, and a much quieter tone than the treble mandolins. The Neopolitan mandocello he developed had increased volume, extended range, and effectively superseded the mandolone as the bass instrument of the mandolin family.

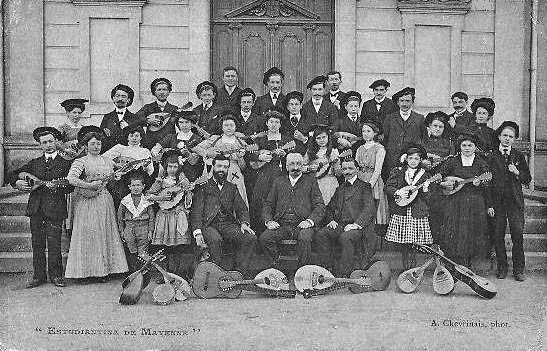
The Mandolin "Estudiantina" of Mayenne, France around 1900 when Mandolin orchestras were at the height of their popularity

Beginning with the Paris Exposition of 1878, the mandolin's popularity began to rebound. In particular, the Spanish Estudiantina Figaro, an "association of young teachers, musicians ... created and established in Madrid forming a magnificent band of guitars, bandurrias and violins" attracted widespread attention.

This was followed by a wave of Italian mandolinists traveling in Europe in the 1880s and 1890s, and in the United States by the mid-1880s, playing and teaching their instrument. The instrument's popularity continued to increase during the 1890s and mandolin popularity was at its height in the "early years of the 20th century. Thousands were taking up the instrument as a pastime, and it became an instrument of society, taken up by young men and women. Mandolin orchestras were formed worldwide, incorporating the mandolin family of instruments—mandolins, mandolas, mandocellos, and even mandobasses—as well as guitars, double basses and zithers.

Around this time, the Gibson company began building mandocellos in the style of their mandolins with arched tops and backs. Gibson is known to have produced at least four models of mandocello between 1905 and the 1920s: the K-1, K-2, K-4, and K-5. Other American instrument companies also produced mandocellos.

After the 1930s the popularity of mandolin ensembles once again began to decline, though not as completely as it had in the 19th century. Mandolins continued to be produced, but production of other members of the family decreased significantly, although—with the possible exception of the mandobass—it never died out completely.

== Tuning and range ==
Usually, courses of two adjacent strings are doubled (tuned to the same pitch). The standard mandocello tuning of C2 C2•G2 G2•D3 D3•A3 A3 is equivalent to that of the violoncello:

- fourth (lowest tone) course: C2 (65.4064 Hz)
- third course: G2 (97.9989 Hz)
- second course: D3 (146.832 Hz)
- first (highest tone) course: A3 (220.000 Hz)

The average range, therefore, is about three-and-a-half octaves, with the exact range depending on the number of frets on the individual instrument: from two octaves below middle C up to D#5/Eb5, in the octave above middle C, (with 18 frets), to as high as A5, with 24 frets.

On 10-string/5-course instruments an additional string-pair, placed above the first course, is tuned to E4 E4, adding an additional half-octave or so to the upper range up to E6.

== Usage ==
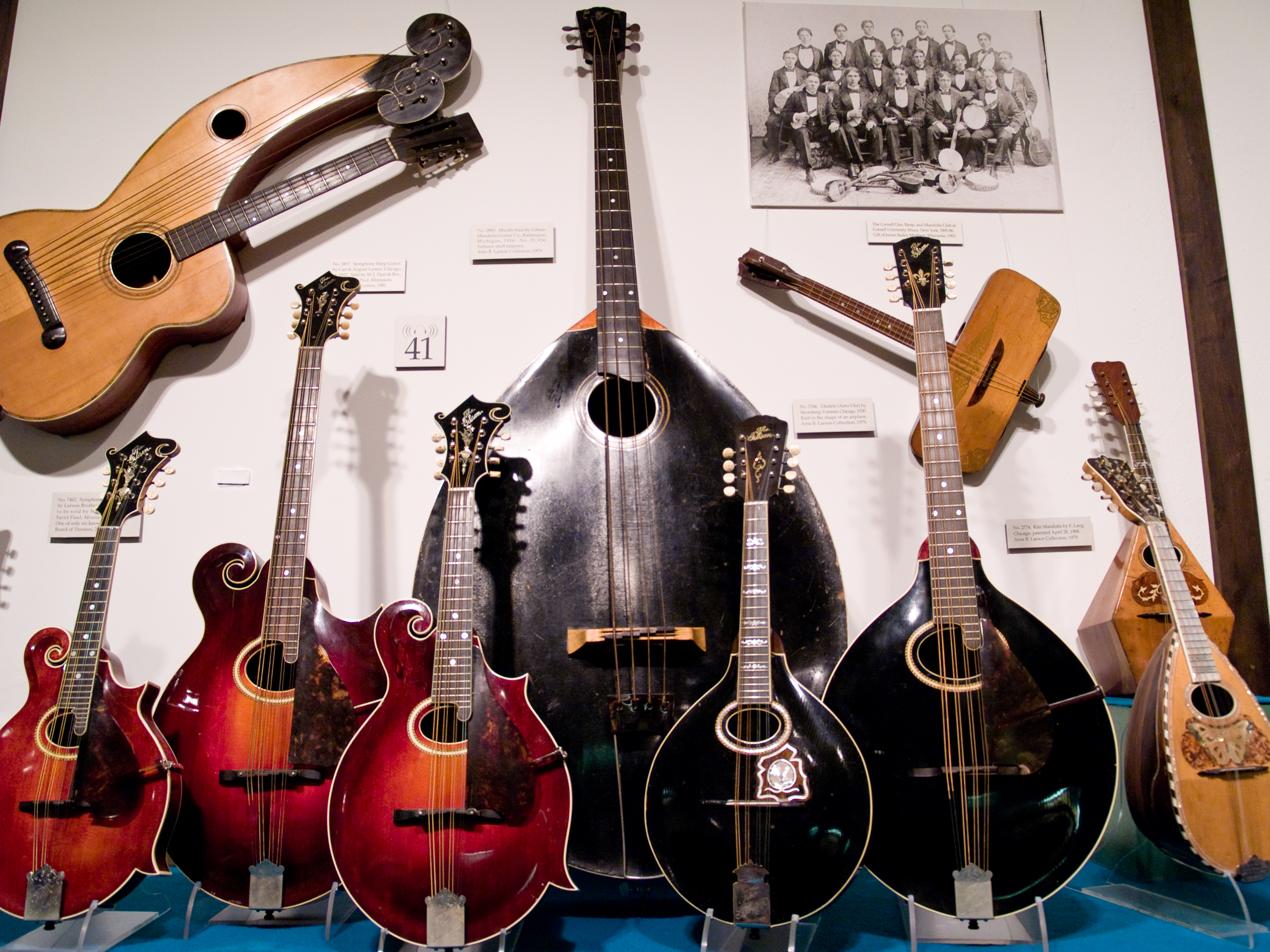
Gibson mandolin family: mandocello is 2nd from right, front row

The bowl-back mandocello is chiefly used in mandolin orchestras and mandolin quartets, where it provides a melodic and bass role similar to the cello in a bowed string quartet. It is occasionally used as a solo instrument for the performance of classical music, such as concertos and unaccompanied repertoire originally composed for solo cello. However, some pieces specifically for liuto cantabile were composed by Raffaele Calace, who championed the instrument in the early 20th century. More recent music for solo mandocello was presented at the 2018 Classical Mandolin Society Convention in Santa Rosa by Dr. James Imhoff. An article on this event and examples of the music appear in the CMSA Mandolin Journal. Imhoff continued these presentations at subsequent CMSA events, including composers from the UK, Germany, Australia, and the USA.

The mandocello also has a role in modern folk music, such as bluegrass or Celtic music. In this setting the flat-back mandocello is typically used. The mandocello's lower range does not produce the bright, projecting sound of the mandolin or mandola, and its use in this setting has been generally eclipsed by mandolin artists since Bill Monroe. The amplified instrument has infrequently been used in modern rock music groups. The bowl-back mandocello (mandoloncello) is traditionally used for Italian folk music.

The most historically significant mandocellist was Raffaele Calace, who wrote the first method book specifically for liuto cantabile, and is thought to have perfected the design of the instrument following its putative introduction by the Vinaccia family. Luigi Embergher also contributed significantly to advancements in the design of the instrument during the late 19th and early 20th centuries.

== Image in contemporary music ==
Accomplished artists specializing in mandocello performance in 21st century America are relatively few in number, and only a modest number of contemporary recordings prominently feature the instrument. One American mandocello artist, Stanley Greenthal, is a specialist in the music of Brittany and an instructor at Zouk Fest. The mandolinist Radim Zenkl is also well known for performances of American, Italian, and other European folk music on the mandocello. One recent recording with mandolin virtuosos Carlo Aonzo and David Grisman has featured Zenkl's mandocello on the album of Italian folk music "Traversata" published by Acoustic Disc. Steve Knightley of the English folk-rock band Show of Hands plays the cello-mandolin, however his instrument is tuned GDAD, similar to an octave mandolin. Mike Marshall, best known for his collaborations with David Grisman, Darol Anger and Chris Thile has performed and recorded frequently with the mandocello. Ryan Delahoussaye of the American rock band Blue October plays a mandocello on stage. His Eastwood Warren Ellis model instrument is styled to resemble an electric guitar.

== Notable uses ==
Steve Knightley, the English folk musician and songwriter, made the mandocello a key part of his songwriting and overall sound, especially with his band Show of Hands. Knightley uses instruments made by David and Nicholas Oddie in Devon, England, in the tuning GDAD which makes the instrument more effective for chunky chord accompaniments as well as playing tunes. Knightly also plays guitar, cuatro mandolin, and tenor guitar.

Geoff Goodman, New York born European jazz musician and composer, features both guitar and mandocello in his compositions.

Patterson Hood, front man for Drive-By Truckers, plays a mandocello made by Scott Baxendale of Baxendale Guitars in Athens Georgia. Baxendale starts with a vintage Harmony guitar and converts it from six string standard tuning to the mandocello.

Bryn Haworth uses a mandocello on his album, Let The Days Go By.

John Nagy and David Grisman play mandocello on the Earth Opera album, The Great American Eagle Tragedy.

Mike Marshall played a mandocello on his collaboration album Uncommon Ritual with Edgar Meyer and Béla Fleck and plays it live occasionally (for example with Darol Anger on violin).

Rick Nielsen of the band Cheap Trick has a stringed instrument collection that includes electric mandocellos custom made by Hamer Guitars. Such an instrument was used for the title track from their LP Heaven Tonight, while their song "Mandocello", released on the band's debut album, used a standard acoustic mandocello. This song was later covered by Concrete Blonde and released on their album Still in Hollywood.

Jaco Pastorius, bassist for Weather Report, overdubbed a mandocello on their hit "Birdland."

Richie Sambora, guitarist for Bon Jovi, used a mandocello on the song "Lay Your Hands on Me" from their acoustic album This Left Feels Right.

Elliott Sharp uses the mandocello in avant-garde as well as modern rock and blues settings, on such albums as Revenge of the Stuttering Child by poet Ronny Someck; with the contemporary blues band Elliott Sharp's Terraplane on the albums Sky Road Songs, 4AM Always, and Kick It Six; in duo with accordionist William Schimmel on Blues, Hues, and Views; and on E#’s solo mandocello album Mandocello.
