= Raffaele Calace =

Italian composer

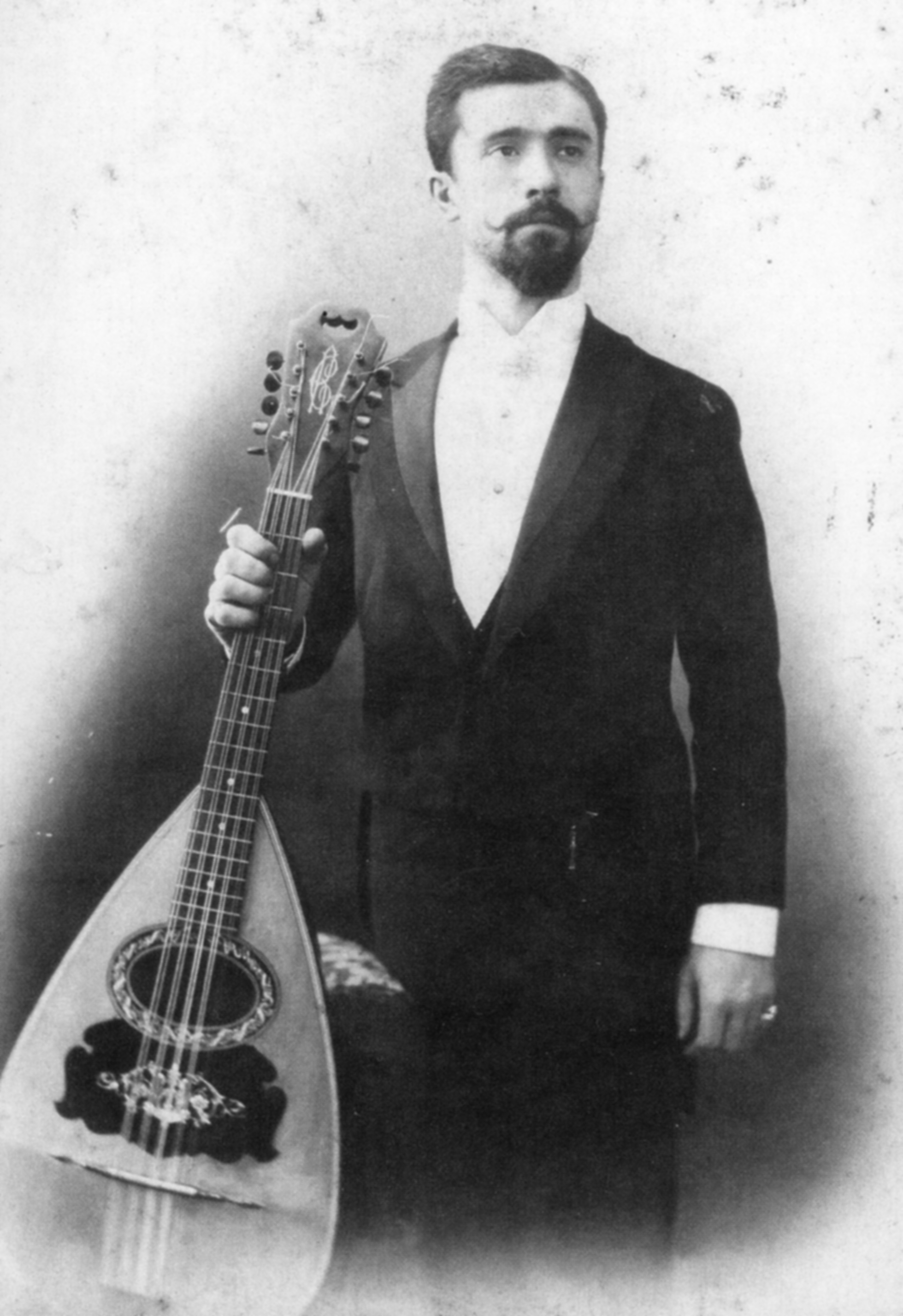
Lutenist Rafaelle Calace holding a liuto cantabile. This photo was taken by 1901 and was featured in Samuel Adelstein's book Mandolin Memories, printed that year.

Raffaele Calace (1863–1934) was an Italian mandolin player, composer, and luthier.

Calace was born in Naples, Italy, the son of Antonio Calace, a successful instrument maker. He initially trained to be a musician, discovered the mandolin, and soon became a virtuoso. After Calace graduated with high honors from the Regio Conservatorio di Musica in Naples, he set out to elevate the mandolin's place in music. To achieve this, he toured Europe and Japan, giving concerts on the Neapolitan mandolin and liuto cantabile. The liuto cantabile is a bass variant of the mandolin family that scholars believe Neapolitan luthiers of the Vinaccia family created in the last decade of the 19th century, and that Raffaele Calace subsequently perfected. Raffaele Calace made three long-playing phonograph records on which he plays mandolin and liuto cantabile.

Raffaele Calace wrote about 200 compositions for mandolin. These include concert works for mandolin solo and compositions for mandolin and other instruments—duets with piano, trio combinations with mandola and guitar, the Romantic Mandolin Quartet (two mandolins, mandola, and guitar), and quintets.

Calace also wrote pedagogical works, including a mandolin method, Schule für Mandoline, and a method for playing the liuto cantabile. The mandolin method was published in 1910 and elaborates on the 18th-century Italian mandolin tutors by Giovanni Battista Gervasio, Gabriele Leone and others. It shows the development of the traditional Italian playing style. The Calace school forms a bridge between other modern methods for mandolin, such as those by Raffaele Calace's countryman Silvio Ranieri, a Roman virtuoso who settled in Brussels, and the American-based Italian mandolinist Giuseppe Pettine.

Raffaele Calace and his brother Nicola Calace, also a musician, also became instrument makers in the Neapolitan mandolin family. They introduced improvements in building techniques and modernized the Neapolitan mandolin. Among other innovations, they enlarged its sound box and—like the Roman luthier Luigi Embergher—extended the fingerboard over the sound hole to increase the range.

At the peak of the golden age of the Neapolitan mandolin in 1922, a grand mandolin playing competition was held in Naples spanning the best mandolin orchestras and soloists. Calace and the other leading Italian mandolin makers of the time including the Fratelli Vinaccia, Giovanni Kasermann, and Luigi Embergher, donated hand made instruments as prizes. The Naples-based newspaper Il Giornale d'Italia wrote that Calace's donated prize, a concert mandolin, was "exquisite in every respect."

When Nicola Calace emigrated to the United States in 1898, Raffaele continued the Calace workshop with his daughter Maria (also a mandolin player), and his son Giuseppe Calace. In addition to plucked instruments, Raffaele made many fine violins, mostly of golden amber varnish. He taught his son, Giuseppe, to make his first violin in 1919. Giuseppe took over the workshop in 1934 upon the passing of his father and submitted a violin, viola, cello, and bass to the 1937 Exhibition of Modern and Contemporary Violin Making in Cremona, Italy. Today the Calace atelier is run by Calace's grandson Raffaele Jr.

== See also ==
- List of mandolinists (sorted)
