= Harvey Samuel Whistler =

American music educator

Harvey Samuel Whistler Jr.
- Born: September 7, 1907; Ventura, California
- Died: March 17, 1976 (aged 68); Ventura, California
- Education: Bachelor of Arts, Fresno State Teachers College; Master of Science, University of Southern California; Ph.D., Ohio State University
- Occupations: Violinist, Music Educator, Composer, Music Arranger, Editor, Author, Bow Collector, Antiquities Appraiser.

Harvey Samuel Whistler Jr. (September 7, 1907 – March 17, 1976) was an American violinist, editor, arranger, and composer of educational music studies for studio, homogenous, and heterogeneous class instrumental (strings and band) instruction. In all, Whistler and colleagues published around 83 known educational music collections and methods for instrumental ensembles. Among his best known works are his violin and viola etude books, "Introducing the Positions," "Preparing for Kreutzer," "From Violin to Viola," and "Developing Double Stops" all of which were published by the Rubank, Inc. music publishing company, and are still available through the Hal Leonard Co.

The development of instrumental music education in American public school began around the turn of the twentieth century. Like many of his early- to mid-twentieth century contemporaries, Samuel Applebaum, Merle J. Isaac, Gilbert Waller, and others, Harvey S. Whistler sought to enhance instrumental music education around the United States by composing, arranging, and editing music educational resources and repertoire for aspiring young musicians. Whistler's instrumental works are known for their repurposing of nineteenth-century solo instrumental etudes for heterogeneous and homogenous instrumental classrooms and elastic scoring. His "Introducing the Positions for violin" remains one of the most recognized shifting etude books in the violin literature.

== Life ==
=== Musical training (1907–1930) ===
Harvey Samuel Whistler Jr. was born September 7, 1907, in Fresno, California, to hotel owners, Harvey Samuel and Sallie Byrn Whistler. His mother, a classically trained pianist, insisted that music be part of Harvey Jr.’s education and oversaw his earliest training on piano. His father, like-minded in his wife's approach, ensured his son attended the local symphony every other week. Around age 9, Harvey Jr. expressed an interest in violin and enrolled in lessons with George W. Hastings (c. 1916-1919), a renowned band and orchestra director from Santa Cruz. At age 13, he switched to Will C. Hays (ca. 1920-1925), his orchestra director and former violinist with the San Francisco Symphony. By age 18, he had developed considerable ability, performing the maestoso, larghetto, and andantino sections of Niccolò Paganini's Le Streghe (Witches’ Dance), Op. 8 at his high school graduation ceremony, the final movement of Mendelssohn's Violin Concerto in E minor, Op. 64 at his studio recital, and Sarasate's Zigeunerweisen, Op. 20 for a local Fresno radio station.

Following high school graduation, Whistler attended Fresno State Teachers College (1925-1930). Personal records suggest Whistler used this period to study piano more seriously and to become better acquainted with woodwind, brass, and percussion instruments, eventually labeling himself a “legitimate” clarinetist. Whistler also continued studying violin and viola with Kornelis Bering, violinist with the San Francisco Symphony, Carl Grissen, violinist and author of the Learn with Tunes violin method, and Karl Ondricek, the Czech violin virtuoso.

Whistler attributed his knowledge of music arranging and composition to Herman A. [August] Hummel, a professional songwriter, arranger, and composer from Cleveland, Ohio. In 1929, Hummel moved his family to Los Angeles at the behest of Sam Fox of the Sam Fox Publishing Company. While there, he assumed a position as Chief of Musical Staff for Fox West Coast Theaters where Whistler performed as a violinist from 1925 to 1930. Though the circumstances of their meeting have been forgotten, Whistler studied with Hummel for several years (ca. 1929–1934), beginning what would become a lifelong collaboration and friendship between the two musicians.

In 1929, Whistler completed his coursework and was appointed Supervisor of Teacher Training for the Fresno State College Training School (FSCTS). Similar to modern-day String Projects, the FSCTS provided instrumental instruction to area school children and teacher training to collegiate students studying instrumental music education. Whistler directed the string and wind ensembles, managed student teachers, and assisted the Head of the Instrumental Department, Howard S. Monger. Citing his work, Arthur G. Wahlberg, Head of the Music Department, later wrote, “His work was so outstanding he could have remained with us indefinitely.” Whistler graduated on June 13, 1930, with a Bachelor of Arts Degree, music special secondary specialization (i.e., teacher licensure), and an honorable mention in scholarship.

=== Public school music educator (1930–1939) ===
One month before graduating from Fresno State, Whistler was appointed Director of Instrumental Music at Selma-Union High School (SUHS) and Grammar School in Selma, California, a position that provided him ample opportunity to hone his newly acquired compositional and pedagogical skills. According to Arthur Wahlberg, Whistler "built the [SUHS] music department into one of the strongest in [California].” SUHS faculty, staff, and students likewise dedicated their 1934 yearbook to him: “The Magnet Staff Broadcasting Company dedicates to Mr. Whistler this twenty-seventh program of [the] Selma Union High School network. Under his baton for the past four years the musical department of SUHS has won not only local but state-wide recognition.”

Outside of work, Whistler continued violin studies with the Russian concert violinist, Josef Piastro Borissoff (c. 1930–1932), and began composing music for his school ensembles. By 1939, Whistler had published six marches with Carl Fischer and Volkwein Brothers music publishing companies, three of which were publicly performed by local city bands. Whistler also remained active in the community running his own private violin studio and serving in the California-Western Division Chapter of the Music Educators National Conference (MENC) as a string clinician and administrative committee member. Most notable of these appointments were his two-terms as President of the California-Western Central Section (1934-1935).

In summer 1933, Whistler enrolled part-time at the University of Southern California to study educational administration with additional coursework in sociology and psychology. He graduated two years later in June 1935 with a Master of Science Degree in education and administrative credentials. His master's thesis entitled, The Organization and Administration of Music Departments in Secondary Schools, provides a rare description of California's public-school instrumental program structure during the 1930s.

After graduation, Whistler and his colleague, Arthur C. Nord (1890-1970), began work on a large-scale string class method book entitled Beginning Strings: The World's Masters-Method for Stringed Instruments (1939). Published in 1939 by Carl Fischer, Beginning Strings was intended for use among “mixed string instrument groups in the public schools”—a sentiment shared by Merle J. Isaac, who had written his namesake String Class Method just one year earlier. Unlike Isaac's book, however, Whistler and Nord arranged and sequenced standard nineteenth-century string methods (e.g., Hohmann, Wohlfahrt, Dancla) for heterogeneous group instruction, arguing that these long-established studies were “going to waste as far as public schools were concerned” and should continue to be studied. Whistler would adopt this ‘repurposing’ approach throughout much of his later works.

In Summer 1938, Whistler left SUHS, handing its directorship over to Nord. Whistler, in turn, assumed Nord's position as Instrumental Music Instructor at Charles W. Eliot Junior High School (EJHS), but only briefly. He resigned in July 1939 to begin a Doctor of Philosophy degree in education and musicology at The Ohio State University.

=== Composer, arranger, scholar, soldier (1939–1947) ===
Around the same time Whistler left EJHS and enrolled in his Ph.D. program, both he and Hummel were hired by Rubank, Inc. to publish educational texts for school string and band ensembles. The pair got to work immediately publishing a number of folios and method books, among them Solos for Strings (1940) and Paving the Way: From Instrumental Instruction to Band Playing (1940), a method book for full-orchestra classes and Whistlers second attempt at a classroom method.

On August 15, 1940, the Mendelssohn Conservatory in Chicago (now defunct) conferred upon Whistler an Honorary Doctorate in Music (D.Mus.), for his work in music education. Two years later, on June 15, 1942, Whistler graduated from OSU after successfully defending his dissertation, “The Life and Work of Theodore Thomas.” According to Ezra Schabas, author of Theodore Thomas: America's Conductor and Builder of Orchestras, Whistler dissertation "deals best with Thomas's Chicago years; including an exhaustive bibliography." Whistler later published parts of the dissertation detailing Thomas as a violinist in the October 1944 volume of Violins and Violinists Magazine.

Intending to refocus his efforts on Rubank, Whistler's plans were interrupted by the U.S. insertion into World War II. On July 19, 1942, thirty-four days after his graduation, Whistler enlisted in the United States Army. He then spent the next three and a half years at various U.S. universities serving as a military instructor, classification officer, and orientation officer for the Adjutant General's Office. By early 1946, First Lieutenant Whistler resigned from service. Military records state:

First Lieutenant Harvey S. Whistler resigned from military service in 1946 during the closing of World War II. During this period, resignations of officers from active duty were being encouraged as part of the phase-out of the military forces.

Joseph Roda, wrote on January 31, 1946, welcoming his friend home. “I suppose you are happy to be a civilian again.”

Despite serving in the war effort, the years between 1941 and 1947 were some of Whistler's most productive as an author and arranger. Whistler published five music folios and methods for orchestra with Hummel and colleagues, including First Steps in Band Playing: A Class Method for All [Band and String] Instruments (1941), Ensemble Time: For Instrumental Trio and Quartet Playing (1943) and Essentials for Band Playing (1943). He also published 26 texts on his own, including his 16-book Modern Instrumentalist Series, described by Rubank as a “series of famous methods and studies entirely revised, re-edited and re-styled to meet the demands of modern education;” his Modern Hohmann-Wohlfahrt: Beginning Method for Violin in two volumes; as well as Introducing the Positions for violin (vol.1, 1944; vol.2, 1946) and cello (1947), Developing Double Stops (1947), and From Violin to Viola (1947).

=== Rubank, Inc. and expanding interests (1947–1962) ===
Upon returning home in 1946, Whistler resumed collaborations with Hummel, publishing a number of folios for both strings and band ensembles (Ensembles for Strings, 1949; String Time, 1949; and Twenty Grand Orchestra Folio, 1950). In the years that followed (1951-1957), Whistler wrote Preparing for Kreutzer etude collections (1952) and Introducing the Positions for Viola (vol.1, 1953; vol.2, 1954). He also worked with Hummel to create the First Series for beginning-level students (First Solo Album, First Etude Album, First Duo, Trio, and Quartet Albums) and their seven duo albums for either two violins or violin and viola, and three trio albums for string or piano trio. All albums were progressive in sequence, keeping in mind the limitations of both beginning and intermediate chamber ensemble, and contain arrangements of marches, waltzes, classical, and traditional tunes.

As Whistler traveled the western and central United States promoting his books at conferences, school districts, and universities, he arrived at the University of Oregon in Summer 1954. While there, Whistler met Georgeanna Kathryn Beaver, a graduate student in music education with two prior degrees in violin performance from the Cleveland Institute of Music. After approximately 18 months of visits, courtship, and many cinnamon buns, Harvey and Georgeanna were married in December 1955. The pair remained inseparable, working together in almost every aspect of Whistler's work outside of Rubank.

By mid-1950, Whistler's and Hummel's texts had garnered significant praise among performers, studio teachers, supervisors of instrumental music, and collegiate faculty around the United States. Frank W. Hill, Treasure and future President of the American String Teachers Association (ASTA) wrote, “Just a note to tell you I am using your books right and left, especially the new ones.” He also requested that Whistler send copies to Paul Rolland, then American String Teacher Journal Editor. Gustave Rosseels, the original second violinist of the Paganini String Quartet, wrote Rubank saying, “A few days ago I received your sample of music comprising a violin method by Harvey S. Whistler . . . I want you to know that in my opinion it is indeed a very fine work.” Rosseels then used Whistler's books to teach his five-year-old son violin. E. Rollin Silfies, Supervisor of Instrumental Music in the Oakland Public Schools wrote, "I received the copies of your two new books . . . we played through practically all of [them] . . .The whole group was most enthusiastic about them as was I." To this point, Dakon (2011, pp. 15–16) further states:

Other institutions such as St. Mary's Academy in Portland, Oregon; the Instrumental Music Program at Louisiana State University; Allegheny College in Meadville, Pennsylvania; and University of California, Santa Barbara all claimed to use Whistler's texts in some fashion, either in instrumental classrooms, applied studio studies, methods courses, or other preservice teacher-training programs.

Alongside his Rubank writings, Whistler also worked on a number of academic projects. In 1948, he wrote an article for Violins & Violinist Magazine on the violin luthier, Jean Baptiste Vuillaume (1947–48), with his long-time friend and authority on fine string instruments, Ernest N. Doring. The two would later co-author Jean-Baptiste Vuillaume of Paris (1961), published by W. Lewis, Chicago. Around the same time, Whistler began collaborating with Louis P. Thorpe, Professor of Secondary Education and Clinical Psychology at the University of Southern California. Whistler and Thorpe published three works in total: Musical Aptitude Test for Grades 4 through 10 (1950), an article on testing for musical talent in Educational Music Magazine, and another on memorizing piano music. They also began a textbook on the psychology of music, however, the project was never completed.

=== Retired author and appraiser (1962–1976) ===
Whistler retired from Rubank in 1962 at age 55. Edward H. Wolske, President of Rubank Inc., wrote the following to congratulate him:

Since your retirement comes up this month, I do want you to know how much I have enjoyed our association. Every once in a while, Harold [Walters; Chief Composer for Rubank] and I discuss Whistler humor and Whistler situations over the years, and I must say out thoughts are always pleasant . . . It is my hope that the fruits of your labor do endure and I am certain that some of your work will be around for years to come.

In the years that followed, Whistler turned his attention to a number of other hobbies he had entertained since the 1930s, namely academic writing, collecting instrument bows, and appraising antiquities. In 1962, he was invited to join the editorial board of the Music Journal where he published String Symposium, a series of five reports “quot[ing] 127 teachers and performers of distinction . . . from various levels of music instruction” on the most pressing pedagogical issues involving violin, viola, cello, and string bass instruction. Among the survey respondents were Rex Underwood, Frank W. Hill, and Paul Rolland, all key figures in the founding of ASTA, as well as renowned string pedagogue, Samuel Applebaum. Also a renowned bow collector, Whistler published several articles in the Music Journal regarding bows and luthiers, namely Francois Tourte, Dominique Peccatte, and Nikolaus Ferder Kittel. He also began work on a multivolume dictionary titled “Bow Makers of the World: A Critical and Historical Encyclopedic Dictionary.” The work was never completed. Harvey Samuel Whistler died on March 17, 1976, at Ventura Community Hospital in Ventura, California, after suffering a stroke one month earlier. He is buried was Grandview Cemetery in Salem, Ohio, and was survived by his wife, Georgeanna Whistler. Dakon (2011) states "Whistler's family and friends remembered him most for his love of learning, his intense compassion toward others, an uncanny sense of humor, and his exuberant presence." James C. Carter of the Amon Carter family wrote the following about his departed friend.

Dr. Whistler, best known to his friends as Harvey, was truly a gentleman, scholar and standing tribute to the professional fields of music and education. . . . His choice of fashioning his life to serve others, irrespectively, came of his inheritance, personal greatness and intelligent evaluation to the needs of others. And from this his life reached fulfillment in the desire to serve to the betterment of fellowman and to his country, all of which he held deep responsibility, regard and warm, honest love and affection."

The Harvey Whistler Papers are housed in The Jerome Lawrence and Robert E. Lee Theatre, Research Institute, Ohio State University Libraries

== Characteristics and contributions ==
Harvey S. Whistler's contributions to American music education are eclectic, consisting of 83 known music pedagogical texts, a psychometric music aptitude test, and more than a dozen writings in music psychology, pedagogy, administration, instrument craftsmanship and appraisal. Of these, Whistler's instrumental methods are the most significant, 65 of which are still in print through Hal Leonard Corporation. Several of his string texts are still recommended in nationally renown repertoire lists, like the ASTA Certification Program, the ASTA String Syllabus and the Indiana University-Bloomington String Academy.

Dakon (2011) asserts that Whistler's methods exhibit three pedagogical characteristics: (1) most works were "retrospectively formatted," meaning they were made up of nineteenth-century etudes that were repurposed for homogenous and heterogeneous instrumental classrooms; (2) most methods used elastic scoring, meaning they were composed and arranged to meet the instrumentation needs of different classroom settings, and (3) they are written using the "C" or "Natural" key approach.

=== "Retrospective formatting" or repurposing ===
Many of Whistler's books contain collections of edited and re-sequenced nineteenth-century string etudes from pedagogues such as Wohlfahrt, Hohmann, Alard, Dancla, and many others. The results are sequential, well-paced, and level-appropriate technique building methods for both beginning- and intermediate-level students. Examples include Whistler's "Modern Klose-Lazarus: Comprehensive Course for Clarinet: A compilation of two famous methods, entirely revised, re-edited, and re-styled." Hyacinthe Klosé and Henry Lazarus, both nineteenth-century clarinet pedagogues, wrote renowned clarinet methods--Klosé Méthode complète de clarinet (1843) and Lazarus Method for Clarinet. Whistler, in turn, edited and resequenced select etudes from each text to create the Modern Klose-Lazarus: Comprehensive Course for Clarinet. Similar work was done with the Preparing for Kreutzer: an intermediate course of violin study based on the famous works of Kayser, Mazas, Dont, De Beriot, Dancla, Blumenstengel, and other masters of the violin repertoire (Vols. 1-2), and Modern Hohmann-Wohlfahrt: Beginning method for violin: a compilation of two famous methods, entirely revised, re-edited, and re-styled to meet the demands of modern education (Vols. 1-2). All of Whistler's duo and trio albums use the same technique, with the purpose of ensuring these valuable texts were not, as Whistler stated, “going to waste as far as public schools were concerned.” To Whistler, these methods belonged not only in the private studios, but in school classrooms.

=== Elastic scoring ===
Seeking to help music instructors tailor repertoire selections to each year's changing class enrollment, many of Whistler's chamber music texts were arranged using elastic scoring. Elastic scoring is a compositional technique in which the score allows for diverse groups of instrumentalists to play the same piece of music. For example, Whistler's Ensembles for Strings refers to itself as "An indispensable ensemble collection for stringed instrument groups, suitable for duet, trio and quartet playing, as well as string orchestra performance." In other words, each piece in the collection could be performed adequately in either duet, trio, quartet, or ensemble form with any instrumentation. Solos for Strings was written in a similar fashion.

=== "C" or "natural" key approach ===
Whistler's books use the 'C', 'natural key', or 'piano' approach, meaning they begin in the key of C and progress through G major, F major, D major, and B♭ major, respectively. While more common in piano instruction, this approach has proven less than ideal for teaching band and string instruments over the past century. Strings typically use the "Sharp" approach, which begin in D major, followed by G, C, F, B♭, A, and E♭ major, respectively. Bands typically use the "Flat" Approach, which begins in B♭ major. Beginning-level students using Whistler's texts will need to be well versed in the key of C major before they start.

=== Popular string instrumental methods ===
==== Introducing the Positions series (1944, 1947) ====
Introducing the Positions for Violin, as the title suggests, is a two-volume series that focuses specifically on the development of positional and shifting technique in all seven positions. Whistler wrote Positions for a couple reasons. First, he believed contemporary school string class methods could not address shifting and positional studies well enough to prepare students for technical demands of the standard orchestral repertoire. Second, other traditional nineteenth-century positional methods for violin available at the time, like De Bériot's Méthode de Violon, Op. 102, Scholz's Schule de Lagenspiels, Op. 3, Ries's Violin School, and Hohmann's Practical Violin Method, introduced the positions sequentially in ascending order (i.e., second, third, fourth, etc.) and, thus, were “of no value to students in the public schools.” Whistler felt it more efficient to begin in third and fifth position, arguing that these positions were not only easier, but also employed more often in orchestral literature.

Subsequently, Introducing the Positions uses an odd-even approach to positional instruction, in that third and fifth position are taught in volume one, followed by second, fourth, sixth, and seventh positions in volume two. Each sections teaches the position first using a variety of exercises and études in C major from nineteenth-century violin methods, such as those of De Bériot, Scholz, Ries, and Hohmann, as well as Alard's Méthode de Violon, Mazas’ Méthode de violon, Op.34, and Wohlfahrt's 50 Easy Melodious Studies, Op. 74. Once students have familiarized themselves with a position, Whistler then introduces shifting into the respective position.

Whistler's battery of shifting exercises are extensive and thorough, exploring nearly all relevant finger combinations on each string of the instrument. The exercises begin with same-finger classical shifts shown in Figure 1. In these exercises, students practice the shift in its simplest form, moving from each respective finger in first position to the same finger in third position (1-1, 2-2, 3-3, 4-4). This sequence is then repeated on each string. The slurred rhythmic pattern used is also strategic. By shifting in a slur, teachers can see and hear whether the student's shift is relaxed and hushed. The repeated half notes then provide the student time to listen and adjust their intonation as necessary after the shift.

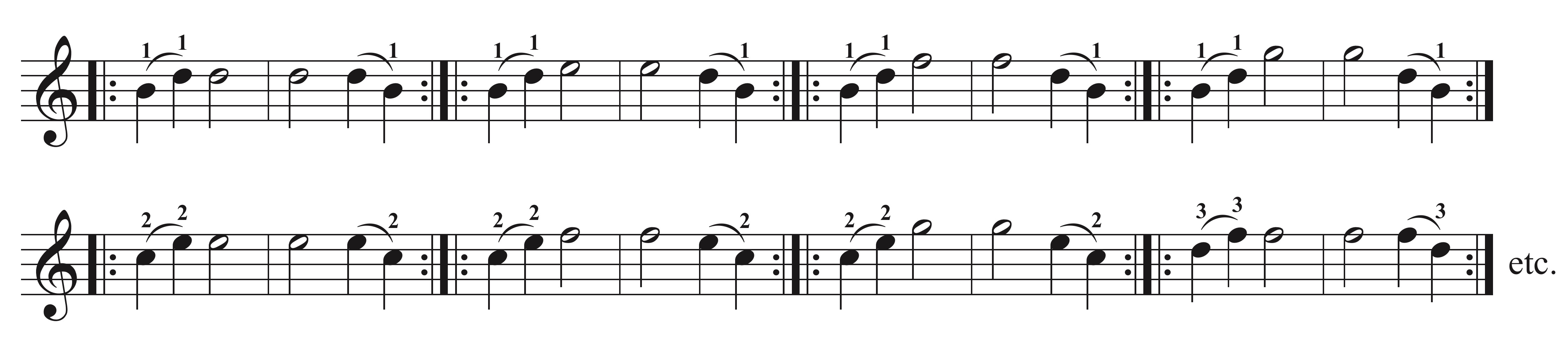
Figure 1. Introducing the Positions for Violin, 1944, p. 8.

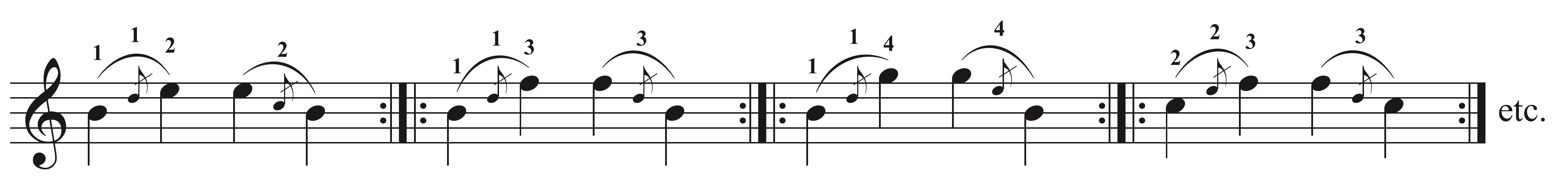
Figure 2. Introducing the Positions for Violin, 1944, p. 9.

Upon completing the same-finger shifting exercises, students move onto new-finger classical shifts, shown in Figure 2. In these exercises, the same-finger shift is practiced again, but as a preparatory motion the new-finger placement. Whistler indicates this using an acciaccatura grace note, more commonly referred to as a guide note. Once the guided shift is complete, the new finger is placed. During initial stages of practice, the guide note should be heard and elongated. “As the student perfects [their] ability to shift from on note to another, the small [guide] note eventually should not be heard,” (emphasis in original).

After these shifting exercises, various nineteenth-century études provide ample practice in an assortment of major keys (G, D, F, B♭, A, and E♭). Both volumes then end with a series of more advanced etudes employing each of the positions, as well as a virtuosic showpiece that demonstrates for students their progress upon completing the book.

Today, Introducing the Positions for Violin remain as relevant as ever in applied and group instructional spaces given its simple, but elegant pedagogical design. Similar volumes were also written for cello (1947) and viola (1953); however, they cannot be implemented in tandem with the violin volumes without significant supplemental resources given differences in each volume's sequence and/or structure. The viola volumes differ from the violin in the sequencing of positions, but are near identical in structure and content up through fifth position with the vast majority of the exercises have been transposed down a fifth. Half position in the viola book replaces the violin's sixth and seventh position, and note-reading exercises have been added to teach violists how to read treble clef in fourth and fifth position. The cello volumes are overall quite distinctive in structure and focus primarily on Joseph Werner's Practical Method for Cello, Op, Book 2.

==== Developing Double Stops for Violin (1947) ====
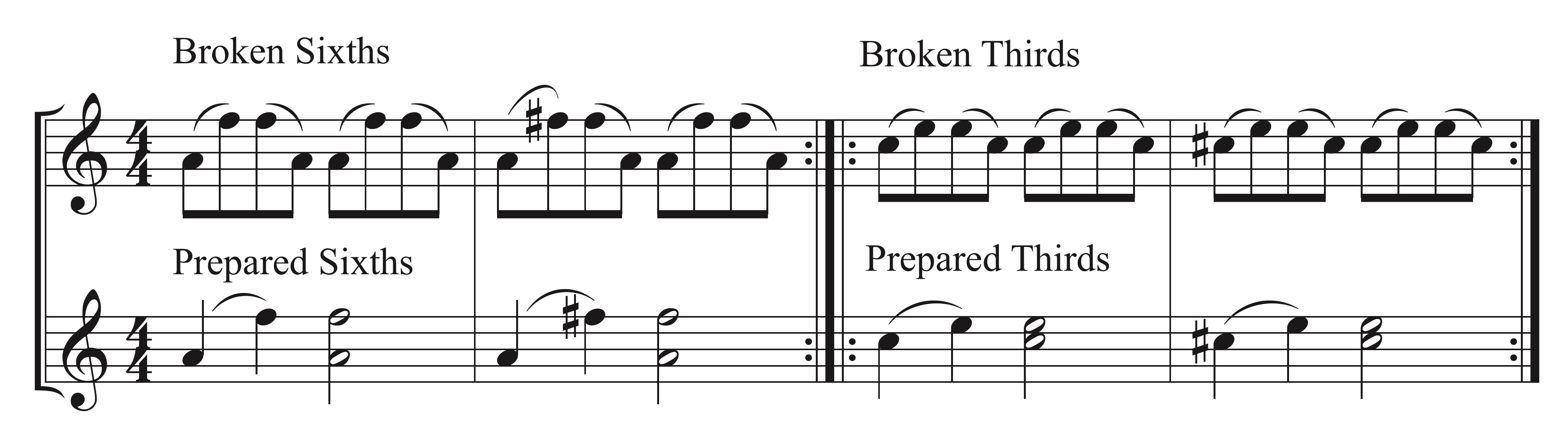
Figure 3. Broken and Prepared Sixths, p. 2; Broken and Prepared Thirds, p. 4.

Like many nineteenth-century violin pedagogues, Whistler believed double-stop studies should begin as soon as students are able. With that end in mind, he wrote Developing Double Stops. The text contains a gradual course of study in sixths, thirds, fourths, octaves, fingered octaves, tenths, and chords. Whistler states, “The early pages of the work [are] easy enough to be studied upon the completion any beginner's book, and [progress to] a stage of advancement comparable to the famous etudes of Kreutzer, Fiorillo and Rode.” The “stages of advancement” noted refer to the book's emphasis on double-stop training in first through fifth position. By the time students complete the book, they should be well prepared for double-stop scales, études, and repertoire.

Developing Double Stops is divided into seven sections. The first four sections develop sixths, thirds, octaves, and fourths in first, third, second, fourth and fifth positions respectively, as well as exercises to practice shifting between each of the positions. The following sections are more advanced, focusing on octave, fingered-octave, tenth, and chromatic double-stop scales and passages. In each section, double-stops intervals are trained systematically using ‘broken’ and ‘prepared’ intervallic exercises on each string set (see Figure 3). Whistler also employs various études from Sitt's 20 Etudes in Double Stops, Op. 32; De Beriot's Méthode de Violon, Op. 102; Leonard's Petite Gymnastique du Jeune Violoniste, Op. 40; and Blemenstengel's 24 Exercises for Violin, Op. 33, among others.

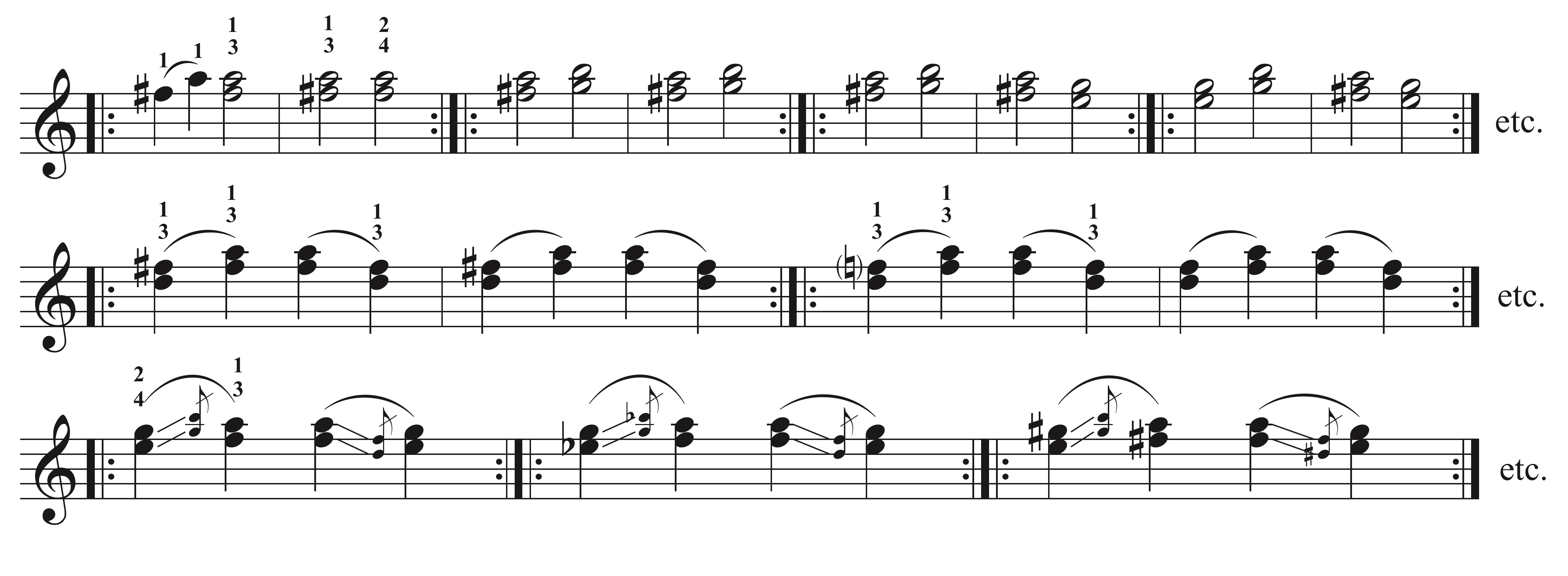
Figure 4. Double-Stop Shifting Exercises, pp. 20–22.

To develop double-stop shifting between positions, Whistler implements a similar approach to that found in Introducing the Positions (see Figure 4). In practice, Developing Double Stops is ideal as either a primary double-stop method or as supplemental material. The method can also be easily coordinated with analogous sections of Introducing the Positions, or paired with Josephine Trott's Melodious Double Stops for more melodic content.

==== Preparing for Kreutzer for Violin (1952) ====
Having developed technique in higher positions and double-stops, Preparing for Kreutzer provide students with a capstone series of nineteenth-century études that integrate all manner of left- and right-hand skills into a variety of rhythmic and tonal contexts. It is no coincidence that Whistler choose Kreutzer as the subject of this method. For the better part of two centuries, Kreutzer's 42 Studies have been viewed as among “the most fertile soil for the growth of violin technique,” and a primary point of entry into more advanced technique. That said, careful preparation is needed before attempting these exercises. To do this, Whistler employs études from twenty-one different violin methods, including the preparatory volumes of Dont (Op. 37) and Blumenstengel (Op. 33), all in an effort to prepare students for Kreutzer.

Preparing for Kreutzer consists of two volumes each addressing various aspects of Kreuzter's études. Volume one begins with a series of bowing variations similar to that of Kreutzer no. 2, and several ‘daily exercises’ that develop tone production, finger strength, and intonation. These techniques are then reinforced through a set of eight first-position etudes and seventeen higher-position etudes that cycle through the major keys ranging four sharps and flats. True to Kreutzer, Whistler dedicates the remainder of the method to trills and double-stop development. In both sections, he writes a rudimentary review of the specified technique, followed by a series of reinforcing intermediate-level études.

Volume two is similar in structure, but focuses on different techniques. The book begins with the same bowing variations applied to a different etude and ‘daily exercises’ that focus on trill development and higher-position arpeggios. The reinforcing études that follow cycle through minor instead of major keys and require shifting in first, third, and fifth positions. Also explored are more thoroughly are chromatics, slurred bariolage, advanced string crossings and slurred staccato. Of particular note are the cadenza studies from Dancla's Op. 52 and Meert's Le Mécanisme du Violon for preparation of Kreutzer no. 23. The book concludes with a series of advanced double-stop études from various methods, as well as several caprices from Mazas’ Op. 36.

In practice, much of these volumes appear not to be consecutive, meaning that students can, and perhaps should study them simultaneously. For students already studying Kreutzer, Whistler's method provides an ideal assortment of supplemental studies, especially in cases where technique needs to be more carefully scaffolded.

==== From Violin to Viola: A Transitional Method (1947) ====
From Violin to Viola introduces viola training into Whistler's curriculum, which up until this point has been centered primarily on developing violin technique. Whistler explains, “The important role played by the viola in orchestral and chamber music literature, as well as its ever-increasing popularity as a solo instrument, certainly is justification for all violinist becoming thoroughly acquainted with the intricacies of the larger instrument [italics in the original].” While this explanation may seem odd by modern-day standards, violists were not always as abundant as they are today. In the 1940s when this book was written (1947), American string educators were concerned about the declining number of students studying stringed instruments across the United States, especially with regards to violists. When public-school orchestras director could not fill their viola sections, they needed a method to help violinist assume these roles. From Violin to Viola was that method.

From Violin to Viola helps developing- and proficient-level violinists learn alto clef and adapt to the increased physical demands of the viola. The collection consists of two parts: 1) transitional exercises to help violinists become familiar with the “intricacies” of the viola, and 2) a progressive course of etudes and melodies to reinforce those skills. The transitional exercises, most likely inspired by Whistler's interactions with violist, Émile Férir, address aspects of tone production, note-reading, finger placement, intonation, C-string resonance, and finger strength specific to viola. The progressive course of study is typical of Whistler's work, introducing first-position scales, etudes, duets, and melodies in a new major or minor key up to 3 sharps and flats. Etude are selected from the methods of Campagnoli, Spohr, Kayser, Mazas, Hofmann, and several others. Also addressed are chromatics, double stops, and fourth-finger extensions. All exercises progressively increase in difficulty as the course progresses. The book, however, does not address viola sizing or positioning.

Other popular books for viola by Whistler are Introducing the Positions for Viola (volumes 1 & 2), and Essential Exercises and Etudes for Viola.

== Biosketches of H. S. Whistler ==
Authors International (1938). Who's Who Today in the Musical World: A Biographical and Pictorial Record of Musicians of Today, Compiled in 1936-7. New York, NY: Authors International Publishing.

ASCAP (1980). ASCAP Biographical Dictionary (4th ed.). New York, NY: R. R. Bowker.

Berger, K. (ed.). (1960). Band Encyclopedia. Evansville, IN: Band Associates.

Bierley, P. E., & Rehrig, W.H. (eds). (1991, 1996). The Heritage Encyclopedia of Band Music: Composers and their Music. 3 vols. Westerville, OH: Integrity Press, pp. 815–16.

Key, P. V. R. (ed.) (1931). Pierre Key's Musical Who's Who: A Biographical Survey of Contemporary Musicians. New York, NY: Pierre Key, p. 434.

Mize, J. T. H. (ed). (1951). The International Who is Who in Music, 5th ed. Chicago, IL: Who is Who in Music, pp. 425–426.

Vickers, J. T. (ed.) (1975). Community Leaders and Noteworthy Americans: Bicentennial Edition, 1975-76. Raleigh, NC: American Biographical Institute, p. 915.

Institute for Research in Biography (1946). Biographical Encyclopedia of the World, 3rd ed. New York, NY: Institute For Research in Biography, p. 1009.

Dakon, J.M. (2011). Dr. Harvey Samuel Whistler Jr. (1907-1976): An Influential Pedagogue and Researcher in Music Education. Journal of Historical Research in Music Education, 33(1), pp. 5–26.

== String methods and chamber music ==
=== String class method book ===
Whistler, H. S. & Nord, A. C. (1939). Beginning strings: The "world's masters" method for stringed instruments. A system of teaching violin, viola, cello and string-bass, with piano accompaniment. New York: Carl Fischer.

=== String quartet and string ensemble folios ===
Whistler, H. S. (1940). Solos for strings: An indispensable string instrument collection for solo or sectional unison playing for violin, viola, cello, string bass, with piano accompaniment. Chicago: Rubank.

Whistler, H. S., & Hummel, H. A. (1950). Twenty grand orchestra folio: Twenty elementary compositions grand for beginning orchestras. Chicago: Rubank.

_______ (1943). Ensemble Time: For instrumental trio or quartet playing. Chicago: Rubank.

_______ (1949). Ensembles for Strings: An indispensable ensemble collection for stringed instrument groups, suitable for duet, trio and quartet playing, as well as string orchestra performance. Chicago: Rubank.

_______ (1949). String time: An elementary ensemble collection for stringed instrument groups. Chicago: Rubank.

_______ (1954). First quartet album: For strings (two violins, viola, cello). Chicago: Rubank.

_______ (1957). Pre-ensemble folio: For strings. Chicago: Rubank.

_______ (1959). Pathway orchestra folio: For training, assembly, and concert. Chicago: Rubank.

=== Scale books ===
Whistler, H. S., & Hummel, H. A. (1955). Elementary scales and bowings for strings. Chicago: Rubank.

_______ (1957). Intermediate scales and bowings for strings. Chicago: Rubank.

=== Duo albums ===
Whistler, H. S., & Hummel, H. A. (1954). First duet album: For two violins. Chicago: Rubank.

_______ (1953). Violin masters’ duet repertoire. Chicago: Rubank.

_______ (1954). String companions: duet collection for violin and viola duet (Vols. 1–2). Chicago: Rubank.

_______ (1954). Selected duets for violin (Vols. 1–2). Chicago: Rubank.

_______ (1955). Apollo album: For violin duet with piano accompaniment. Chicago: Rubank.

_______ (1957) Lyric album: For violin duet with piano accompaniment. Chicago: Rubank.

=== Trio albums ===
Whistler, H. S., & Hummel, H. A. (1954). First trio album: for three violins. Miami, FL: Rubank.

_______ (1955). Dorian album for string trio; violin, cello & piano. Chicago: Rubank.

_______ (1955). Lydian album: For string trio (violin, cello, piano). Chicago: Rubank.

_______ (1954). Program album for string trio (violin, cello, piano). Chicago: Rubank.

=== Violin method books and music ===
Whistler, H. S. (1944). Modern Hohmann-Wohlfahrt: Beginning method for violin; a compilation of two famous methods, entirely revised, re-edited, and re-styled to meet the demands of modern education (Vols. 1–2). Chicago: Rubank. (Part of the Modern Instrumentals Series)

_______ (1944). Introducing the positions for violin (volume 1: Third and fifth positions). Chicago: Rubank.

_______ (1946). Introducing the positions for violin (volume 2: Second, fourth, sixth and seventh positions). Chicago: Rubank.

_______ (1947). Developing double stops for violin: A complete course of study for double note and chord development. Chicago: Rubank.

_______ (1952). Preparing for Kreutzer: an intermediate course of violin study based on the famous works of Kayser, Mazas, Dont, De Beriot, Dancla, Blumenstengel, and other masters of the violin repertoire (Vols. 1–2). Chicago: Rubank.

_______ (1953). Chromatic Fingering Chart for Violin: Through Seven Positions and Half-Position. Chicago: Rubank.

_______ (1957). Scales in first position: For violin. Chicago: Rubank.

_______ (1962). Melodies in first position: For violin and piano. Chicago: Rubank.

_______ (1948). Christmas time: For violin with piano accompaniment. Chicago: Rubank.

Whistler, H. S., & Hummel, H. A. (1949, 1954). First solo album: For violin with piano accompaniment. Chicago: Rubank.

_______ (1954). First etude album: For violin. Chicago: Rubank.

=== Viola method books and music ===
Whistler, H. S. (1947). From violin to viola: A transitional method. Chicago: Rubank.

_______ (1953). Introducing the positions for viola (volume 1: Third and half positions). Chicago: Rubank.

_______ (1953). Introducing the positions for viola (volume 2: Second, fourth, and fifth positions). Chicago: Rubank.

_______ (1954). Essential exercises and études for viola: An intermediate course of study for the development of technical proficiency in the first position. Chicago: Rubank.

Whistler, H. S. & Hummel, H. A. (1954). Concert and contest collection for viola with piano accompaniment. Miami, FL: Rubank.

=== Cello method books and music ===
Whistler, H. A. (1947). Introducing the positions for cello (volume 1: The fourth position). Chicago: Rubank.

_______ (1947). Introducing the positions for cello (volume 2: Second, second-and-a-half, third, and third-and-a-half positions. Chicago: Rubank.

Whistler, H. A. & Aller, G. (1957). Autumn Nocturne: Selected Solos for Cello with Piano Accompaniment (Shifting Solos). Chicago, Rubank.

_______ (1957). Starlight Waltz: Selected Solos for Cello with Piano Accompaniment (Shifting Solos). Chicago, Rubank.

== Full orchestra and band methods and music ==
=== Educational compositions for other publishers ===
Whistler, H. S. (1933). Glorious Youth March. Carl Fischer.

_______ (1934). Spirit of the Day March. Carl Fischer.

_______ (1935). Stadium Triumph March. Carl Fischer.

_______ (1937). Campus Honors March. Carl Fischer.

_______ (1939). Gridiron Glory March. Volkwein Brothers.

_______ (1939). Banners Flying March. Volkwein Brothers.

_______ (1942). Pigskin Parade. In J. M. Fulton, E. Chenette & Others "Let's Cheer" Band Book. Philadelphia, PA: Theodore Presser.

=== Rubank albums and pieces ===
Whistler, H. S. (1939). Fanfares of the Air for Three Trumpets or Cornets. Chicago: Rubank.

Edwards, S., Holmes, G. E. and others. (1940). Marching Along in Time and Time. Chicago: Rubank.

- National Fame (Whistler)
- Varsity Victory (Whistler)
- Noble Spirit (Whistler)
- Colors on Parade (Whistler)

Whistler, H. S. & Hummel, H. A. (1940). On the Air: Sixteen Scintillating Radio Styled Tunes for Musical Groups that “Step Out.” Chicago: Rubank.

_______ (1941). Chorale classics: For ensemble, band, orchestra, or mixed voices. Chicago: Rubank.

Brandenburg, A. H., Skornicka, J., Welke, W., Wersen, L., & Whistler, H. (1942). Americana Collection: For Band, Orchestra, or Voices. Chicago: Rubank.

Whistler, H. S. & Hummel, H. A. (1948). California Gold Centennial: March. Chicago: Rubank.

_______ (1948). Solo & ensemble band folio. Chicago: Rubank.

_______ (1949). Program and parade band folio: An introduction to standard repertoire. Chicago: Rubank.

Walters, H. L., Whistler, H. S., and Hummel, H. A. (1954). Challenger Concert Folio for Band. Chicago: Rubank.

Frank, F. L., Hummel, H. A., and Whistler, H. S. (1958). First Concert Folio for Band: For Training, Assembly, and Concert. Chicago: Rubank.

_______ (1960). Music Time Band Folio from Solo and Unison Elementary Band Playing. Chicago: Rubank.

=== “Triumvirate” full-orchestra class method book ===
Volume 1: Whistler, H. S. & Hummel, H. A. (1941). First Steps in Band Playing. Chicago: Rubank.

Volume 2: _______ (1940). Paving the way: From instrumental instruction to band playing. Chicago: Rubank.

Volume 3: _______ (1943). Essentials of band playing. Chicago: Rubank.

=== The Modern Instrumental series ===
Whistler, H. S. (1941). Modern Klose-Lazarus: Comprehensive course for clarinet: A compilation of two famous methods, entirely revised, re-edited, and re-styled. Chicago: Rubank.

_______(1942). Modern Arban-St. Jacome comprehensive course for cornet or trumpet: A compilation of two famous methods, entirely revised, re-edited, and re-styled. Chicago: Rubank.

_______(1942). Modern Arban-St. Jacome: comprehensive course for trombone or baritone: A compilation of two famous methods, entirely revised, re-edited, and re-styled. Chicago: Rubank.

=== Foundation studies ===
Whistler, H. S. (1944-1952). Modern Pares: Foundation studies. Chicago: Rubank. (12 books)

Modern Pares: Foundation Studies Texts
Clarinet	Bassoon
Cornet or Trumpet	French Horn
Trombone or Baritone	E♭ Alto or Mellophone
Saxophone	E♭ Bass
Flute or Piccolo	BB flat Bass
Oboe	Marimba, Xylophone, or Vibes

=== Rubank elementary/advanced methods ===
Whistler, H. S. (1940). Beginning bell lyra: An elementary method for individual or class instruction. Chicago: Rubank.

_______ (1940). Rubank elementary method bell lyra: A fundamental course for individual or like-instrument class instruction. Chicago: Rubank.

_______ (1945). Rubank elementary method for timpani: A fundamental course for individual or like-instrument class instruction. Chicago: Rubank.

_______ (1946). Rubank advanced method for drums: an advanced course of study designed to follow up any of the various elementary or intermediate methods. Chicago: Rubank.

=== Solo wind and brass pieces ===
Whistler, H. S. (1941) Easter Dawn: Reverie (Trumpet or Cornet). Chicago: Rubank.

== Writings ==
=== Music psychology ===
Whistler, H. S., & Thorpe, L. P. (1950). Musical Aptitude Test (Series A): For Grades 4 through 10. Hollywood: California: Test Bureau. Includes answer sheets. Tests, Se-Z.

_______ (1952, March). Testing for musical talent. Educational Music Magazine, 31, 16–17.

_______ (1959, July–August). Memorizing piano music: Help from a pair of psychologist-musicians. The Piano Teacher, 1(6), 4–8.

_______ (n.d.) Music Psychology Textbook. Unfinished manuscript. Harvey S. Whistler Papers, The Ohio State University Library Special Collections.

=== Music education ===
Whistler, H. S., & Whistler, G. B. (1962). String symposium, part I: The cello. Music Journal, 20(1), 74–77.

_______ (1962). String symposium, part IIa: The violin. Music Journal, 20(2), 53–56.

_______ (1962). String symposium, part IIb: The violin. Music Journal, 20(3), 54–56, 86, 88, 91.

_______ (1962). String symposium, part III: The viola. Music Journal, 20(4), 30, 50–51, 55.

_______ (1962). String symposium, part IV: The string bass. Music Journal, 20(5), 53, 69–70.

=== Theses and dissertations ===
Whistler, H. S. (1935). The organization and administration of music departments in secondary schools. Masters Thesis, University of Southern California, Los Angeles.

_______ (1942). The life and work of Theodore Thomas. Doctoral Dissertation, Ohio State University, Columbus.

Whistler, H. S. (1944, October). Theodore Thomas as a Violinist. Violins and Violinists, 6(4), 140–148.

=== Musical instruments and bows ===
Whistler, H. S. & Doring, E. (1947, September). Jean Baptiste Vuillaume and his Master Workman, part 1. Violins and Violinists, 8(7), 264–268.

_______ (1947, October–November). Jean Baptiste Vuillaume and his Master Workman, part 2. Violins and Violinists, 8(8), 304-309

_______ (1947, December). Jean Baptiste Vuillaume and his Master Workman, part 3. Violins and Violinists, 8(9), 348–354.

_______ (1948, January). Jean Baptiste Vuillaume and his Master Workman, part 4. Violins and Violinists, 9(1).

Whistler, H. S. (1955, March). Giovanni Battista Rogeri. The Strad, 65(779), 374–375.

Doring, E. N., & Whistler, H. S. (1961). Jean-Baptiste Vuillaume of Paris. Chicago: W. Lewis.

Whistler, G. K., & Whistler, H. S. (1965, May). Francois Tourte: Bow maker supreme, part 1. Music journal, 23(5), 26–27, 75–77.

_______(September, 1965, September). Francois Tourte: Bow maker supreme, part 2. Music journal, 23(6), 45–46, 77–79.

_______(1967). Fake bows: To be or not to be. Music Journal 25(5), 36–37, 71–72.

_______(1968). Guest editorial. Music Journal, 26(5), 4.

_______(1968). The musical collector's desideratum: Violin bows. Hobbies, 73(4), 80, 98.

_______(1969). Dominique Peccatte: From barber to bow maker. Music Journal, 27(5), 27–28, 59–61.

_______(1969). Dominique Peccatte: From barber to bow maker, part 2. Music Journal, 27(6), 19, 39, 41.

_______(1969). Dominique Peccatte: From barber to bow maker, part 3. Music Journal, Anthology, 52, 116–117.

_______(1969). Dominique Peccatte: From barber to bow maker, part 4. Music Journal, 27(7), 43, 88–89, 92–93.

_______(1969). Nikolaus Ferder Kittel: The Russian Tourte. The Strad, 80(949, 950, 951). pp. 31–37, 81–87, 127–131.

_______(1969). Nikolaus Ferder Kittel: The Russian Tourte. Music Journal, 24(5), 26–28, 74.

_______(1969). Nikolaus Ferder Kittel: The Russian Tourte. Music Journal, 24(6), 31–32, 57.

Whistler, H. S. (1976). Appraising bows for musical instruments. Valuation, 23(1), 140–152.
