= List of étude composers =

An étude is a musical composition (usually short) designed to provide practice in a particular technical skill in the performance of a solo instrument.

== For the piano ==
=== Born 1700–1799 ===
- Hélène de Montgeroult (1764–1836): 114 études
- Daniel Steibelt (1765–1823): fifty études (Op.78)
- Johann Baptist Cramer (1771–1858): eighty-four études, Op. 50, Short Studies, Op. 100
- Johann Nepomuk Hummel (1778–1837): twenty-four études (Op. 125)
- Alexandre-Pierre François Boëly (1785–1858): 30 études (Op. 6)
- Carl Czerny (1791–1857): many études, of which the best known are his Opp. 299 and 599
- Ignaz Moscheles (1794–1870): études (Op. 70), twelve character études (Op. 95), three concert études (Op. 51)
- Henri Bertini (1798–1876): twenty-four études (Op. 29)

=== Born 1800–1850 ===
- Amédée Méreaux (1802–1874): sixty études, op. 63
- Henri Herz (1803–1888): Études de l'agilité (Op.179), thirty etudes progressives (Op.119), 24 etudes (Op.151), 24 etudes (Op.152)
- Louise Farrenc (1804–1875): Trente études in all the major and minor keys, Op. 26 (1838), Douze études brillantes, Op. 41 (1853)
- Friedrich Burgmüller (1806–1874): many études, of which the best known are his 25 Études faciles et progressives, Op. 100, and 12 Études, Op. 105
- Felix Mendelssohn (1809–1847) three posthumous études (Op. 104b) and one étude in F minor (WoO 1)
- Robert Schumann (1810–1856): Studies (Op. 3) and Études (Op. 10) after Paganini's Caprices; and the Symphonic Studies (Op. 13, in three revisions: 1834, 1852, and posthumously 1893).
- Frédéric Chopin (1810–1849): 24 études in two sets of 12 each (Opp. 10 and 25), plus three more (a little easier), for a total of 27.
- Franz Liszt (1811–1886): set of Transcendental Études, with its two previous versions being Étude en douze exercises and Douze Grandes Études; six études, also with an earlier set, on themes by Niccolò Paganini (among them the famous La Campanella); and six concert études (one set of three, another set of two and Ab Irato which also has an earlier version). In contrast with Chopin's études, which tend to stress a specific aspect of performance difficulty, Liszt's études tend to stress mastery of performance as a whole. Liszt also wrote 12 books of Technical Studies (S.146) between 1868 and 1880.
- Charles-Valentin Alkan (1813–1888): Trois Études de bravoure (Op. 16); études in all 12 major keys (Op. 35) and in all 12 minor keys (Op. 39); and also three Grande Études (Op. 76). He also wrote three other études: Op. 17 (Le preux), Op. 27 (Le chemin de fer), and two without opus number.
- Stephen Heller (1813–1888): twenty-four études Op. 16, 25 Études Op. 45, 30 Études Op. 46, 25 Études Op. 47, 24 Nouvelles études d'expression et de rhythme Op. 125, 4 Études d'après Der Freischütz Op. 127, twenty-one Études techniques pour préparer à l'exécution des ouvrages Op. 154, among others
- Adolf von Henselt (1814–1889): twenty-four études, Opp. 2 and 5.
- Theodor Kirchner (1823–1903): twelve études, Op. 38 (1878), Études rythmiques et mélodiques, Op. 105
- Bedřich Smetana (1824–1884): concert étude, Am Seegestade – Eine Erinnerung
- Julius Schulhoff (1825–1898): twelve études
- Louis Moreau Gottschalk (1829–1869): Tremolo and Manchega, two concert études.
- Johannes Brahms (1833–1897): fifty-one Exercises for Piano (published in 1893), Five Studies, Anh.1a/1 (1852-1877)
- Camille Saint-Saëns (1835–1921): two sets of six études each (Opp. 52 and 111) and 6 études for the left hand (Op. 135)
- Carl Tausig (1841–1871): Etude 'Le Ruisseau', Op.6, 2 Etudes de concert, Op.1b
- Brasílio Itiberê da Cunha (1846–1913): Etude de Concert d'aprés Philip Emanuel Bach (Op. 33)
- Théodore Lack (1846–1921): 12 études elégantes Op.30, Études de bravoure Op.43, Études artistiques Op.91
- Agathe Backer-Grøndahl (1847–1907): nineteen Concert études.

=== Born 1850–1899 ===
- Henrique Oswald (1852–1931): Trois Etudes pour piano, plus three independent études
- Rafael Joseffy (1852-1915): School of Advanced Piano Playing
- Moritz Moszkowski (1854–1925): 3 concert études (Op. 24), 2 concert études (Op. 48), Ecole des doubles notes (Op. 64), 15 Études de Virtuositié (Op. 72), 2 études (Op. 78), 12 studies for the left hand alone (Op. 92), and 20 technical studies (Op. 91).
- Anatoly Lyadov (1855–1914): three études (Op. 5, Op. 12 & Op. 37)
- Cécile Chaminade (1857-1944): Six Études de Concert (Op. 35)
- Sergei Lyapunov (1859–1924): Douze études d'exécution transcendante in memory of Liszt
- Edward MacDowell (1860–1908): concert étude (Op. 36), 12 études (Op.39) and 12 études (Op. 46)
- Anton Arensky (1861- 1906): 12 études (Op. 74), 4 études (Op. 41)
- Georgy Catoire (1861–1926): one étude (Op. 8)
- Claude Debussy (1862–1918): 12 études (L. 136)
- Emil von Sauer (1862–1942)
- Felix Blumenfeld (1863–1931): eighteen études.
- Gabriel Pierné (1863–1937): concert étude (Op. 13)
- Jean Sibelius (1865–1957): étude in A minor (Op. 76, No. 2)
- Ferruccio Busoni (1866–1924): six études (Op. 16); an Étude en forme de variations (Op. 17); and Six Polyphonic Études.
- José Vianna da Motta (1868–1948): "Exercices de Virtuosite" (1908), based on Alkan's works.
- Charles Tournemire (1870–1939): Études de chaque jour (Op. 70)
- Leopold Godowsky (1870–1938): sixty studies on Chopin's études, of which 53 are published; three original Concert Studies (Op. 11), and the Étude Macabre.
- Alexander Scriabin (1872–1915): twenty-six études (Opp. 2, 8, 42, 49, 56 and 65)
- Sergei Rachmaninoff (1873–1943): two sets of Études-Tableaux (Opp. 33 and 39).
- Charles Ives (1874–1954): twenty-three studies for piano between 1910 and 1923
- Josef Hofmann (1876–1957)
- Sergei Bortkiewicz (1877-1952): ten Etudes (Op.15)
- Ernő Dohnányi (1877–1960): six "Concert Études" (Op. 28).
- Nikolai Medtner (1880-1951): Etude in G-sharp minor (Op. 4, No. 1)
- Nikolai Roslavets (1881-1944): three Études (1914)
- Béla Bartók (1881–1945): three Études (Op. 18)
- Igor Stravinsky (1882–1971): Quatre études (Op. 7)
- Karol Szymanowski (1882–1937): four études Op. 4 and 12 études Op. 33
- Alfredo Casella (1883–1947)
- Pedro Humberto Allende (1885–1959): Nueve Estudios (1920-36)
- Sergei Prokofiev (1891–1953): four études (Op. 2)
- Samuil Feinberg (1890–1962): Suite (Op. 11) In Étude Form.
- Kaikhosru Shapurji Sorabji (1892–1988): 100 Transcendental Studies (1940–44)
- Virgil Thomson (1896–1989): nine études
- Oscar Lorenzo Fernández (1897–1948): Três estudos em forma de sonatina (Op. 62)

=== Born after 1899 ===
- Lennox Berkeley (1903–1989)
- John Corigliano (born 1938): Etude Fantasy for Piano (1976)
- André Jolivet (1905–1974): 6 études
- Louise Talma (1906–1996): Six études (1954) for piano
- Mozart Camargo Guarnieri (1907–1993): twenty études composed between 1949 and 1988
- Olivier Messiaen (1908–1992): Quatre études de rythme
- John Cage (1912–1992): Etudes Australes and Etudes Boreales
- Maurice Ohana (1913–1992): Douze Études d'interprétation
- Witold Lutosławski (1913–1994): two études (1940–1941)
- George Perle (born 1915): two sets of études
- Thomas Henderson Kerr Jr. (1915-1988): Dancétudes: 7 Vignettes of Dolls and Pets
- Earl Wild (1915–2010): Seven Virtuoso Études (1976) on popular songs of George Gershwin
- Ned Rorem (1923–2022): set of eight études (1975)
- György Ligeti (1923–2006): three volumes of études (1985, 1988–1994 and 1995)
- Robert Starer (1924–2001): The Contemporary Virtuoso, a set of 7 études
- Einojuhani Rautavaara (1928–2016): six études (Op. 42)
- Pierre Max Dubois (1930–1995)
- H. Leslie Adams (born 1932): "Twenty-six Études for Solo Piano."
- Jacques Charpentier (1933–2017): 72 études karmatiques
- Philip Glass (born 1937): two volumes of études between 1991 and 2012.
- Nikolai Kapustin (1937–2020): Eight Concert Études (Op. 40), Three Études (Op. 67), Five Études in Different Intervals (Op. 68)
- William Bolcom (born 1938): won the Pulitzer Prize for Music in 1988 for his Twelve New Études for Piano
- Tomáš Svoboda (born 1939): two volumes of Nine Études in Fugue Style (Op. 44) and (Op. 98) for piano
- Bill Hopkins (1943–1981): nine Études en série (1965–72) in three Cahiers
- Almeida Prado (1943–2010): 14 études
- Pascal Dusapin (born 1955): Études for piano (1998–99)
- Toshio Hosokawa (born 1955): Six Etudes (2011–2013)
- Ezequiel Viñao (born 1960): first book of études in 1993
- Marc-André Hamelin (born 1961): twelve études in minor keys, and an étude after Rimsky-Korsakov (which was the previous 1st piece of the 12 études set, but it was replaced by the Triple Étude after Chopin-Godowsky)
- Lowell Liebermann (born 1961): Etudes on Brahms Songs Op.88 (2004), Etudes on Songs of Robert Franz Op.91 (2005)
- Unsuk Chin (born 1961): currently working on a set of 12 Piano Studies, of which six have been completed
- Karen Tanaka (born 1961): Techno Etudes (2000)
- Juan María Solare (born 1966): the cycle Postales submarinas (études for inside piano) in 2011.
- Daisuke Asakura (born 1967): seven études, one for each disc of his Quantum Mechanics Rainbow series
- Nimrod Borenstein (born 1969)
  - 6 Etudes, Op. 66: Ostinato Étude opus 66 No. 1 (2014), Half Moon Étude opus 66 No. 2 (2016), Tango Étude opus 66 No. 3 (2016), Arpeggio Étude opus 66 No. 4 (2018), Kangding Qingge Étude opus 66 No. 5 (2019) Méphisto Étude opus 66 No. 6 (2019)
  - 6 Etudes, Op. 86: Staccato/Legato Étude opus 86 No. 1 (2019), Chords Étude opus 86 No. 2 (2020), Hidden Melodies Étude opus 86 No. 3 (2020), Brazilian Étude opus 86 No. 4 (2020), Toccata Étude opus 86 No. 5 (2020), Japanese Gardens Étude opus 86 No. 6 (2020)
- Martin Kutnowski (no info): Five tango études (2001)

== For other instruments ==
=== In chronological order ===
- Girolamo Diruta (c. 1554–1610) for the organ
- Jean-Louis Duport (1749–1819): for the cello
- Rodolphe Kreutzer (1766–1831): for the violin
- Mauro Giuliani (1781–1829): for the guitar
- Justus Johann Friedrich Dotzauer (1783–1860): for the cello
- Matteo Carcassi (1792–1853): for the guitar
- Theobald Boehm (1794–1881): for the flute
- Napoléon Coste (1805–1883): 25 études de genre, for guitar
- Friedrich Grützmacher (1832–1903): Op. 38 Études for the cello
- Franz Wohlfahrt(1833–1884):60 Studies for Violin (Op. 45)
- David Popper (1843–1913): for the cello
- Joachim Andersen (1847–1909): for the flute
- Francisco Tárrega (1852–1909): Douze Études, for guitar
- Emile Sauret (1852–1920) 24 études-caprices for violin
- Julius Klengel (1859–1933): for the cello
- Joseph Bonnet (1884–1944): étude de concert, for organ
- Heitor Villa-Lobos (1887–1959): for the guitar
- Darius Milhaud (1892–1974): Cinq études, Op. 63, for piano and orchestra (1920); Etude poétique, Op. 333, musique concrète (1954); Études, Op. 442, for string quartet (1973)
- Igor Stravinsky (1882–1971): Quatre études for orchestra, and Étude pour pianola
- Andrés Segovia (1893–1987): for the guitar
- Herbert Eimert (1897–1972): Etüde über Tongemische, electronic music (1953–54)
- Lillian Fuchs (1903–1991): for the viola
- Alan Rawsthorne (1905–1971): Symphonic Studies, for orchestra (1938)
- Olivier Messiaen (1908–1992): Vocalise-étude, for soprano and piano (1935)
- Pierre Schaeffer (1910–1995): Cinq études de bruits (1948), for musique concrète (turntable technology), consisting of (1) "Étude aux chemins de fer", (2) "Étude aux tourniquets", (3) "Étude au piano I", (4) "Étude au piano II", and (5) "Étude aux casseroles". Also wrote Étude pathétique (1948), Étude violette (1948), both turntable-technology musique concrète, Étude aux sons animés (1958), Étude aux allures (1958), and Étude aux objets (1959), all for tape-technology musique concrète
- John Cage (1912–1992): Freeman Etudes for the violin
- Jeanne Demessieux (1921–1968): 6 études, for organ
- Francis Dhomont (1926–2023): Études pour Kafka for electronic sound production
- Jean Barraqué (1928–1973): Étude for three-track tape
- Pierre Boulez (1925–2016): Deux études, musique concrète
- Hans Werner Henze (1926–2012): Sinfonische Etüden for orchestra (1956, rev. 1964); Etude philarmonique, for solo violin (1979)
- Karlheinz Stockhausen (1928–2007): Konkrete Etüde, musique concrète, as well as Studie I and Studie II for electronic music
- Easley Blackwood (1933–2023): Twelve Microtonal Etudes for Electronic Music Media, Op. 28
- Angelo Gilardino (born 1941): five volumes of Studi di virtuosità e di trascendenza for guitar
- Brian Ferneyhough (born 1943): Etudes Transcendantales for mezzo-soprano and chamber ensemble
- Robert deMaine (born 1969): Études-Caprices for cello

=== By instruments ===
==== Organ ====
- Girolamo Diruta (c. 1554–1610)

Oboe

- Gilles Silvestrini (Born 1961)

==== Flute ====
- Joachim Andersen (1847–1909)
- Theobald Boehm (1794–1881)
- Giulio Briccialdi (1818–1881)
- Anton Bernhard Fürstenau (1792–1852)
- Giuseppe Gariboldi (1833–1905)
- Philippe Gaubert (1879–1941)
- Ernesto Köhler (1849–1907)
- Marcel Moyse (1889–1984)
- Ástor Piazzolla (1921–1992)
- Paul Taffanel (1844–1908)
- Trevor Wye (b. 1935)

==== Guitar ====
- Fernando Sor (1778–1839)
- Mauro Giuliani (1781–1829)
- Dionisio Aguado y García (1784–1849)
- Matteo Carcassi (1792–1853)
- Giulio Regondi (1822–1872)
- Francisco Tárrega (1852–1909)
- Heitor Villa-Lobos (1887–1959)
- Andrés Segovia (1893–1987)
- Leo Brouwer (b. 1939)

==== Violin ====
- Bartolomeo Campagnoli (1751–1827)
- Rodolphe Kreutzer (1766–1831) — 42 études ou caprices is considered by some as an indispensable foundation for developing essential violin technique.
- Niccolò Paganini (1782–1840) — instrumental étude is said to be one of Paganini's major accomplishments.
- Heinrich Wilhelm Ernst (1812–1865)
- Jakob Dont (1815–1888)
- Charles Dancla (1817–1907)
- Jacques Féréol Mazas (1782–1849)
- Franz Wohlfahrt (1833–84)
- Henry Schradieck (1846–1918)
- Otakar Ševčík (1852–1934)
- John Cage (1912–1992) — John Cage's Freeman Etudes are noted for their extreme difficulty.

==== Viola ====
- Lillian Fuchs (1903–1991)

==== Cello ====
- Jean-Louis Duport (1749–1819)
- Friedrich Dotzauer (1783–1860)
- Joseph Merk (1795–1852)
- Sebastian Lee (1805–1887)
- Auguste Franchomme (1808–1884)
- Bernhard Cossmann (1822–1910)
- Friedrich Grützmacher (1832–1903)
- David Popper (1843–1919)
- Wilhelm Fitzenhagen (1848–1890)
- Julius Klengel (1859–1933)
- August Nölck (1862–1928)
- Mikhail Bukinik (1872–1947)
- Rudolf Matz (1901–1988)
- Robert deMaine (b. 1969)

==== Trumpet/Cornet ====
- Jean-Baptiste Arban (1825–1889) — La grande méthode complète de cornet à piston et de saxhorn par Arban contains 14 characteristic studies that function as performance études.
- Herbert L. Clarke (1867–1945) — Clarke's Characteristic Studies for Cornet contains 15 solos as review études that close out the method.
- Théo Charlier (1868–1944) — 36 Études Transcendantes
- Vassily Brandt (1869–1923) — 34 Studies for Trumpet (On Orchestral Motives)
- Marcel Bitsch (1921–2011) — Vingt études pour trompette ut ou si♭
