= Harold L. Walters =

American composer, arranger, and editor

Harold Laurence Walters (September 29, 1918 — October 22, 1984) was an American composer. He also used the pseudonym Fred L. Frank.

== Life & career ==
Walters was born on September 29, 1918 in Gurdon, Arkansas.

Walters began taking music lessons and playing cornet at the age of eight. During his five years as a tuba player and arranger with the US Navy Band, he completed his undergraduate studies at the University of Cincinnati's College Conservatory of Music (CCM) in Cincinnati, Ohio, under Nadia Boulanger. Walters also studied at the American University in Washington, D.C. and at the Washington College of Music, where he received his doctorate in 1943.

Walters later worked as a conductor and composer in Washington and New York City for theaters, film and various orchestras; including the well-known orchestra of Sigmund Romberg. After 1947, he was associated with the music publisher Rubank, Inc. as a composer, arranger, and editor. Walters' work includes around 1,500 compositions and arrangements as well as books on instrumental instruction.

Walters conducted wind bands and orchestras all over the world. "[T]he smallest," he recalled, "was a 9-piece circus band and the largest was the 12,800-piece massed band at the University of Michigan."

He died on October 22, 1984 in Hollywood, Florida.

== Works for concert band ==
- 1947 Badinage for Brasses
- 1949 Disc Jockey
- 1949 Copa Cabana
- 1950 Deep River Rhapsody
- 1951 Dixieland Revel, March
- 1951 Latin American March
- 1951 Sound and Fury
- 1951 Forty Fathoms Solo for Eb Tuba
- 1952 A Hot Time in the Brasses Tonight!
- 1952 TV Suite
- 1953 The Christmas Suite
- 1953 King size
- 1954 La Mascarada
- 1955 American Folk Suite
- 1955 Viva Paulo!
- 1957 Leetonia Overture for Band
- 1957 Three Scenes
- 1960 Concertante Solo for BBb Tuba
- 1961 Civil War Suite
- 1962 Spiritual Contrasts
- 1962 He's got the whole world medley
- 1962 I'm on my Way
- 1963 Hootenanny Folk Festival for Band
- 1964 Trumpet Filigree for Trumpet and band
- 1966 Jamaican Folk Suite
- 1967 Duty Honor, Country for Narrator and band
- 1968 Aztec Overture (as Fred L. Frank)
- 1970 Instant Concert
- 1971 Japanese Folk Suite
- 1972 Bands around the World
- 1975 Country and Western
- 1980 Suite Americana
- Brasses to the Fore, March

== See also ==
- Wolfgang Suppan, Armin Suppan (2010). Das Blasmusik-Lexikon. Vol. 5. Kraichtal: HeBu-Musikverlag. pp. 792 f. ISBN 978-3-9806925-9-5.
