= Suppan =

Suppan is a Germanized form of the Slavic surname Zupan (or Župan). Notable people with the surname include:

- Armin Suppan (born 1959), Austrian musician
- Arnold Suppan (born 1945), Austrian historian
- Gernot Suppan (born 1985), Austrian footballer
- Jakob Suppan (1734–1810), composer from the Holy Roman Empire
- Jeff Suppan (born 1975), American pitcher
- Sigismund Suppan (1814–1881), bishop of Banská Bystrica
- Wolfgang Suppan (1933–2015), Austrian musicologist
