= Franz Wohlfahrt =

Franz Wohlfahrt may refer to:

- Franz Wohlfahrt (composer) (1833–1884), German composer
- Franz Wohlfahrt (footballer) (born 1964), Austrian footballer
