= Jan van Beekum =

Dutch composer and conductor

Jan van Beekum (16 August 1918 in The Hague - 29 November 2001 in Dieren) was a Dutch composer and conductor.

At age 11 he played the clarinet in various local brass bands around the Hague. He studied at the Royal Conservatory in his hometown, studying Clarinet, Music Theory and Piano and graduated 1945th in 1945.

After a while he was clarinetist with the Gelders Orchestra (then Arnhem Orchestra Association). At the same time he continued his studies as a conductor. As a conductor, he undertook the leadership for two orchestras. He has also served in the Dutch broadcasting company VARA as a judge of singing competitions.

As a composer he has created works for various ensembles, study literature and wind band works. He wrote several pedagogical works. In addition, he regularly acted as a judge in the singing competitions broadcast TV and was also a music consultant for the Association of Workers' Singing Societies. He also worked for different occupations, did educational work, and especially military and brass music.

== Works ==
Works for wind band

- 1978 Trumpets in a hurry
- 1980 Adspirantissimo
  1. Adspirantenmars
  2. Adspirantenwals
  3. Adspirantentango
  4. Adspirantenfoxtrot
- 1980 Russian Rhapsody
- 1981 Krontjong Rhapsody
- 1982 Fair Play
- 1982 Music for a Ceremony
  1. "Trumpet Tune" de Maurice Greene
  2. "Air" de Johann Sebastian Bach
  3. "March" en Ludwig van Beethoven
  4. "Festive March from Joshua de Georg Friedrich Handel
- 1988 Music by Candelight
- 1989 Spanish Impressions
  1. Paso Doble-
  2. Habanera
  3. Spanish Waltz
  4. Beguine
- 1992 A Country Dance Party
- Three funny songs for choir and brass band
  1. Predominant wave
  2. When economic crowns
  3. Beautiful hiking is

== Bibliography ==
- Wolfgang Suppan, Armin Suppan: Das Neue Lexikon des Blasmusikwesens, 4th edition, Freiburg-Tiengen, Blasmusikverlag Schulz GmbH, 1994, ISBN 3-923058-07-1 Auflage, Freiburg-Tiengen, Blasmusik Schulz Verlag GmbH, 1994, ISBN 3-923058-07-1
- Paul E. Paul E. Bierley, William H. Bierley, William H. Rehrig: The heritage encyclopedia of band music : composers and their music, Westerville, Ohio: Integrity Press, 1991, ISBN 0-918048-08-7 Rehrig: The heritage encyclopedia of band music: composers and Their Music, Westerville, Ohio: Integrity Press, 1991, ISBN 0-918048-08-7
