= Ervin Kleffman =

American composer (1892–1987)

Ervin Henry Kleffman (born 11 January 1892 Dorchester, Wisconsin; died 2 April 1987 San Gabriel, California) was an American composer whose music is played by concert and marching bands throughout the world. He is best known for his marching band compositions, Salute to Peace and China Clipper.

His primary instruments were trumpet and violin.

== Selected Compositions ==
- Salute to Peace
- China Clipper
- My Buddy (polka, for 3 cornets, or solo cornet or 2 cornets) with band; accompaniment arranged for piano Rubank, Inc., Chicago (publisher) (1933) OCLC 55216875 OCLC 8632812 OCLC 459797269
- Legionnaires on Parade (march) OCLC 444747771
- Pride of the Pacific (march) OCLC 457071327
- Rubato Caprice (for 3 coronets), Rubank, Inc., Chicago (publisher) (©1938)
- The Spartans (march) OCLC 451078125
- Jantzen Beach March
- Minstrel Parade March OCLC 456107868
- Hank and Lank (drum and trombone feature) Rubank, Inc., Chicago (publisher) (©1933) OCLC 458291755
- America the Glorious (march for band), dedicated to Hale Ascher VanderCook (1864–1949), C. Fischer (©1954) OCLC 34578337
- Pride of the Nation (commissioned for the Notre Dame University Band
- Onward and Upward
- Mounties on Parade
- East Meets West
- Blaze of Glory OCLC 720277402

== Professional career ==
He taught at the American Conservatory of Music and the Chicago Musical College.

== Education ==
- Bachelor and Master of Music — VanderCook College of Music, Chicago
- 1940 — PhD from the now defunct Emerson University in Los Angeles

== Text publications ==
- Ervin H. Kleffman, How to Compose, Harmonize and Arrange a March for Full Band (1952)
- Ervin H. Kleffman, Course of Lessons in Musical Expression and Interpretation (1917)
- Ervin H. Kleffman, Series of treaties on band, orchestra and instrumental teaching (1920)
