= Melvin H. Ribble =

American jazz musician (1870-1964)

Melvin Ribble
- Born: January 11, 1870; Nodaway, Iowa, U.S.
- Died: May 3, 1964 (aged 94) Lincoln, Nebraska, U.S.
- Genres: Jazz, concert band music
- Instruments: Cornet, baritone horn

Melvin H. Ribble (January 11, 1870 – May 3, 1964) was an American cornetist, baritone hornist, and prolific composer and arranger of concert band music.

== Career ==
In 1889 Ribble, moved from his hometown, Clarinda, Iowa, to Lincoln, Nebraska, to play cornet with the Ashman Band. In 1898, he moved to Chicago, Illinois, where he obtained work as a staff arranger with Harry L. Alford's music publishing company. He worked writing custom arrangements. While in Chicago, Ribble composed and arranged for the Victor Music Co., later Rubank. Victor was a small predecessor to Rubank. Ribble moved back to Lincoln in 1931 and established his own arranging business. During this time, Ribble did many arrangements for Billy Quick, who directed the University of Nebraska band for many years.

== Selected works ==
Compositions

- "The World Holds But One For Me," lyrics by Lora Evelyn Slater, music by Ribble, arranged by Carlton Lee Colby (1881–1937) (M.H. Ribble Co. ©1913)
- "Lovers' Lane," lyrics & music by Ribble, arranged by Carlton Lee Colby (1881–1937) (M.H. Ribble Co. ©1913)
- "Lizella Overture" (Fillmore Bros./Rubank ©1912) OCLC 456703731
- "Song of the Bull Moose" (Victor ©1919) OCLC 449245100
- "Night's Enchantment," tone poem (Victor ©1923) OCLC 456565021
- "Bennet's Triumphal March" (Victor 1923/Rubank ©1925; renewed 1952) OCLC 449242258
- "Twilight Thoughts," serenade (Victor 1925/Rubank ©1931) OCLC 457920449
- "Dainty Maid dancette" (Rubank ©1925)
- "Teamwork," march (Rubank ©1925) OCLC 456091694, 456089097
- "Blue Moon," waltz (Rubank ©1931)
- "Spirit of America" (Rubank)
- "Starter March" (Rubank ©1931)
- "Village Chapel," tone poem (Rubank ©1931)
- "Warming Up," march (Rubank ©1931) OCLC 451276689
- "The Street King," march (Rubank ©1937) OCLC 456088960
- "Invincible Yank," march (Rubank ©1937) OCLC 449876234

Band arrangements published by Victor

- "London Hippodrome," by William Edward Flathers (1867–1940), arranged by Ribble (Victor ©1914) OCLC 444767169
- "The World's Military, by William Edward Flathers (1867–1940), arranged by Ribble (Victor ©1914) OCLC 456450843
- "Spirit of the West," by Herman August Hummel (aka Harold A. Hummer; 1892–1967), arranged by Ribble (Victor ©1917) OCLC 451417162
- "Bull's Triumphal March," by William Edward Flathers (1867–1940), arranged by Ribble (Victor ©1919) OCLC 449245100
- "Harmoniana," by John Francis Galuska (1881–1946), arranged by Ribble (Victor ©1923) OCLC 458632730
- "Jubilant: Overture," by John Francis Galuska (1881–1946), arranged by Ribble (Victor ©1924) OCLC 459789522
- "A Novel Novelette," by Edward S. Chenette (1885–1963), arranged by Ribble (Victor ©1925) OCLC 456560951
- "Simplicity," by Ira S. Loos (1867–1926), arranged by Ribble (Victor ©1925) OCLC 451072503
- "Slidin' Some," by Edward S. Chenette (1885–1963), band arrangement by Ribble (Victor ©1925, Rubank ©1952)

Band arrangements published by Milton Weil

- "Wherever You Go — Whatever You Do," by Bernie Grossman (né Bernard Leopold Grossman; 1885–1951), Joe Goodwin (né Joseph A. Goodwin; 1889–1943), Larry Shay, & Benny J. Meroff (1901–1973), arranged by Ribble (Milton Weil Music Co. ©1926) OCLC 457041461
- "Sweethearts on Parade," by Carmen Lombardo & Charles Newman, arranged by Ribble (Milton Weil Music Co. ©1928) OCLC 42930912

Band arrangements published by other publishers

- "Looking at the World Through Rose-Colored Glasses"
- "Dream Train"
- "Highways Are Happy Ways"
- "So Tired," slow march, by George A. Little (1890–1946) & Arthur Sizemore (1891–1954), arranged by Ribble (Harold Rossiter Music Co. ©1927) OCLC 456576023

Arrangements for the University of Nebraska Band

- "March of the Cornhuskers," lyrics and music by Ribble and William T. Quick
- "Hail Varsity," lyrics by Joyce Ayres, music by Wilbur Chenoweth, arranged by Ribble
- "Fight Song"

== See also ==
- Screamer (march)
- American march music
