= Himie Voxman =

American musician and composer (1912 – 2011)

- Born: Hyman Samuel Voxman; September 17, 1912; Centerville, Iowa, United States
- Died: November 22, 2011 (aged 99); Iowa City, Iowa, United States
- Burial place: Westlawn Cemetery, Norridge, Illinois, United States
- Education: University of Iowa (BSE, MA)
- Occupation: Composer · musician · teacher · university administrator
- Known for: Music pedagogy
- Children: 2
- Parents: Morris Voxman; Mollie Voxman, née Tzipanuk

Himie Voxman (September 17, 1912 – November 22, 2011) was an American musician, teacher, university administrator, and composer known for producing many volumes of pedagogical compositions and literature for wind instruments. In 1954, he began his tenure as the Head of the Department of the University of Iowa School of Music, and when the School of Music was restructured in 1963, he became the director, a position which he held until 1980. During his career, Voxman produced nearly 300 different compilations, arrangement, and method publications, which were all dedicated for wind instruments.

== Early life and education ==
=== Early life ===
Himie Voxman was born Hyman Samuel Voxman on Semptember 17, 1912 in Centerville, Iowa to Morris Voxman and Mollie Voxman, née Tzipanuk. His parents were Jewish-Ukrainian immigrants who had fled from an antisemitic Russian Empire and settled in the Jewish community of Centerville in 1910. Voxman was the fourth of five children, with three older siblings who were born in Ukraine (which was then part of the Russian Empire). After his father's death, he was the only one out of his five siblings to not drop out of school.

Following graduating at the top of his class in grammar school in 1925, Voxman began his lessons with William Gower, Centerville's town band director and his music teacher. He used to play music to silent films at his local theater or spent time rehearsing in the town's band room. In high school, he had taken every class available and occasionally substituted for other teachers.

=== Education ===
Voxman studied at the University of Iowa, receiving a bachelor's degree in chemical engineering in 1933 and a master's degree in the psychology of music. Throughout his education at the university, he participated in the symphony orchestra and university band. When studying for his bachelor's degree, he taught private clarinet lessons in the Iowa City area to afford his education. After graduating in 1933, he had no interest in pursuing music as a career, but Carl Seashore offered him an assistantship in psychology and audiology and he decided to achieve a master's degree in the psychology of music, which he completed in 1934.

== Career ==
=== University of Iowa ===
In 1934, Voxman started teaching music at Iowa City High School and it was there he met his future wife, Lois Wilcox, a fellow music teacher. During his years at the high school, he was also working part time at the University of Iowa, and in 1936 was hired full time as a woowinds instructor. Voxman eventually became a professor, and in 1954, he began his tenure as the head of the Department of Music, succeeding Philipp Greeley Clapp. Throughout his career, Voxman made significant contributions to woodwind pedagogy and music education.

During Voxman's tenure as director, the School of music grew exponentially. In 1966, the University of Iowa Symphony Band would play a tour in Europe during the Cold War, which Voxman would secure a sponsorship from the United States Department of State. The band consisted of 86 musicians and played 40 concerts in 9 countries over the span of 79 days. The tour consisted of tops in France, Portugal, Belgium, Luxembourg, Spain, Germany, Austria, and the USSR. In 1972, the university opened their new music building, which was connected to Hancher Auditorium. However, in the Iowa flood of 2008, both buildings would ultimately be destroyed. The project was funded through the Rockefeller Foundation, when they awarded the School of Music a grant for the construction of a Center for New Music.

Among his former students is the classical saxophonist Eugene Rousseau, cofounder of the World Saxophone Congress and president of the North American Saxophone Alliance.

=== Literature ===
During his tenure as director, he spent several summers traveling around Europe with the goal of collecting unpublished wind solo and chamber music pieces to use in his educational literature and for students to use in their dissertations. Throughout his trips, he visted places such as the Prague National Museum, Franz Liszt Academy of Music, Bartok Library, and Budapest National Museum. On his first trip to Europe, in 1954, Voxman found a 1785 edition of Amand Vanderhagen's clarinet method and he found Johann Melchior Molter's four clarinet concerti, composed sometime around the years of 1742 and 1750. Other works found across Europe include Carlo Besozzi's manuscripts of oboe concerti, a composition from Ludwig Van Beethoven's protege Erzherzhog Rudolf, and an unpublished Johann Christian Bach oboe concerto.

Over the span of his life, Voxman produced nearly 300 different publications for mainly brass and woodwind instruments. His first publication was with William Gower. Voxman and Gower wrote the Gower and Voxman Modern Method, which was published in 1938 by the Jenkins Music Company. The book sold 6,000 copies within its first year of being published. Following the popularity of their first book, the duo produced Advanced Method for Clarinet, which was published by Rubank, Inc. Together, Gower and Voxman created around 30 publications. Voxman produced many other books on his own, with some of his popular series including Selected Studies, Concert and Contest Collections, Soloist and Duetist Folios, Ensemble Classics, Chamber Music series, and Classical Studies. Most of his works were published by Rubank, Inc. Over is career, he also wrote many articles for publications such as International Clarinet Journal and the International Association of Music Libraries.

== Personal life ==
Voxman met his wife Lois Wilcox (1912-1996) in the 1930s and they had two sons. Following the passing of his wife, he established the Lois R. Voxman Scholarship. Voxman passed away on November 22, 2011, in Iowa City at the age of 99.

== Awards and affiliations ==
=== Awards and honors ===
- Distinguished Service Award from the Iowa Music Educators Association (1975)
- Edwin Franko Goldman Citation from the American Bandmasters Association (1983)
- Distinguished Alumni Award from the University of Iowa (1993)
- Medal of Honor from the Midwest Clinic (1994)
- Distinguished Service Award from the Missouri State High School Activities Association (1996)
- Honorary Member of the International Clarinet Association (2000)
- Iowa Bandmaster's Association Hall of Fame Inductee (2013)
- Silver Baton Award from The Bell System
- Honorary doctorate from Coe College
- Doctor of Humane Letters from DePaul University
- Award of Merit from the Federation of State High School Music Associations
- Doctor of Humane Letters from the University of Iowa
- Induction into the National High School Hall of Fame under the Fine Arts category from the National Federation of State High School Associations.

He also received various citations from collegiate fraternities and honors from Phi Mu Alpha Sinfonia, Mu Phi Epsilon, Pi Kappa Lambda, Sigma Alpha Iota, Tau Beta Pi, Phi Lambda Upsilon, and Sigma Xi.

The University of Iowa School of Music's Voxman Building is named after Voxman.

Voxman also has a scholarship established for him, named the Himie Voxman Scholarship Fund.

=== Affiliations ===
- West Central division 1958 convention committee chairman and member at large of the Executive Committee of the Music Teachers National Association (1959)
- Woodwind judge for the final round of the Canadian National Competitive Festival of Music (1984)
- Chairman of the Commission on Graduate Studies for the National Association of Schools of Music
- National Commission for Accreditation of Teacher Education and Welfare
- North Central Association of Colleges and Schools
- United States Department of Health, Education, and Welfare
- Academic Panel for cultural exchange projects for the United States Department of State
- Vice president of the Iowa Music Educators Association
- National Chairman of the committee on Higher Education for the Music Educators National Conference (1966)
- Editorial associate for the Journal of Research in Music Education.
