= Christian Heinrich Hohmann =

German composer and music educator

Christian Heinrich Hohmann (March 7, 1811 in Niederwerrn – May 12, 1861 in Schwabach) was a German composer, music educator and the author of Violin School.

== Life ==
Hohmann was a son of farmer and tailor Georg Hohmann and Anna Hörlein. He worked as a teacher at a teacher training college Altdorf and Schwabach, and wrote several educational books including violin school, which is now known as "Hohmann-Heim" (ISMN M-700014-11-7). He also reissued the original (formerly of Universal Edition Vienna, now in the FIRMAMENT music publishing and music sales mbH, Berlin).

He composed commissioned work including chamber music, organ, piano, song for solo and choir, and gave the songs of Stuntz, Kreutzer, Salieri, Mozart, Breidenstein, Maurer, Hohmann, Freck, Call, Nägeli, Haydn, Schneider, Marschner, Graun, Tröger, Mendelssohn, Keller, Zöllner, Wölfel, Lindpaintner for men's choir with special consideration to pedagogical aspects. Quote: "So all the songs are given in score so that the singer has all 4 voices before him. This facility gives unmistakable advantages."

== Work ==
- "Violin school I" 1835 (by Karl Nowotny) ISMN M-008-00848-1
- "Violin school II" 1836 (by Karl Nowotny) ISMN M-008-00849-8
- "Violin school III" 1836 (by Karl Nowotny) ISMN M-008-00850-4
- "Violin school IV" 1836 (by Karl Nowotny) ISMN M-008-00851-1
- "Violin school V" 1836 (by Karl Nowotny) ISMN M-008-00852-8
- "The songwriter from Germany. A selection of four-voice songs for the men's choir". 2 Hefte. Altdorf 1843/1848
- "Der Liederbote aus Franken. Eine Auswahl vierstimmiger Gesänge für den Männerchor". 2 Hefte. Altdorf 1843/1848
- "55 two-part folk songs for violin"

== Literature ==
- "Christian Heinrich Hohmann. a well-known Frankish music pedagogue of the 19th century" by Artur Wirth in: JbHVMittelfrk 82, 1964/65, S. 250–255
