= August Nölck =

German Cellist (1862–1928)

August Nölck (né August Friedrich Robert Nölck; 9 January 1862 in Lübeck – 12 December 1928 in Dresden) was a prolific composer, virtuoso cellist, pianist, and music educator of the German School of Romanticism. He produced over 250 music pieces, many of which have endured and are performed today. Nölck is well known for his cello repertoire.

== Styles ==
As professor of cello and piano, Nölck composed over three hundred works that included concertos, whims, waltzes, concertina, gavottes, minuets, mazurkas, funeral marches, and the like. However, due to the two World Wars in Germany and political divisions of the nineteenth and twentieth centuries, only his works produced in Venezuela have been recovered.

Nölck was part of the Dresden School of cello playing, which included Friedrich Wilhelm Grützmacher, who formed a foundation for the modern school of technique represented by Pablo Casals, Emanuel Feuermann, and others. Nölck's music reflects the Romantic styles of Brahms, Schumann, and Mendelssohn.

Nölck studied music at the Bernuthsche Konservatorium in Hamburg, Germany, which was founded 1 October 1873, by Julius von Bernuth (1830–1903). The conservatory was once located at 15 Wexstrasse on the ground floor and at another time, at grosse Theaterstrasse 44 in the home of the piano manufacturer, Otto Börs. (Note: Otto Börs, Pianofortefabrik, located in Hamburg at grosse Theaterstrasse 44, was founded by Otto Börs in 1850. By 1873, 50 workers were employed there. (Handbuch der Leistungsfähigkeit der gesammten Industrie der Kleinstaaten Norddeutschlands, der süddeutschen Länder, Elsass-Lothringens und der Schweiz, Vol. 2, N°s 4–5, by Christoph Sandler, 1874, pg. 50 OCLC 162973872)) While at the conservatory, Nölck became friends with a fellow student, Hugo Rüter (1859–1949), who went on to become a notable German composer.

There is limited biographical information on this composer.

== Family ==
August Nölck was born to the marriage of Johann Daniel Conrad Nölck and Maria Margaretha Bohnhoff. Nölck married Franziska Lewis, the first girlfriend of one of his close friends and conservatory classmate, Hugo Rüter.
