= Rubank, Inc. =

American music publisher

- Status: Defunct
- Predecessor: Finder & Urbanek
- Founded: 1926
- Successor: Hal Leonard Corporation
- Country of origin: United States
- Headquarters location: Chicago
- Publication types: Sheet music

Rubank, Inc., founded in 1926, was a large music publisher based in Chicago that is now, by way of acquisition, part of the Hal Leonard Corporation. Rubank specialized in music aimed at the music education market.

== History ==
Rubank was born out of a three-way partnership of Finder & Urbanek of Chicago, a large music publisher, jobber, and manufacturer of specialties for the saxophone. Finder & Urbanek incorporated and changed its name to Rubank, Inc. in 1927 when George Adam Finder (pronounced FEN der not FIND er; 1894–1962), one of the partners, sold his interest to the other partners, Harry Ruppel, Sr. (1888–1957) and Joseph James Urbanek (1894–1953).

Rubank eventually moved to Miami and was managed by Edward H. Wolske (president), Judith Ann Nelson (secretary), and Janice Beth Ruppel (vice president) (1948–2006). The corporation, still an Illinois entity, filed for voluntary dissolution in 1988.

== Selected Rubank composers ==
- Melvin H. Ribble (1870–1964)
- Charlotte Ruegger (1876-1959)
- Harold L. Walters (1918–1984), chief composer for Rubank until his death
- Ervin Kleffman (1892–1987)
- Karl King (1891–1971)
- Himie Voxman (1912–2011)
- Victor Ewald (1860–1935)
- Hale Ascher VanderCook (1864–1949)
- Eugene De Lamater (1876-1943)
- Harvey S. Whistler (1907-1976)
- Herman A. Hummel (1892-1967)
- Robert MacArthur Crawford (1899–1961)
- Frederick Converse (1871–1940)
- Clifton Williams (1923–1976)
