= Pioneer, Iowa =

Unincorporated community in Humboldt County, Iowa, United States

- Unincorporated community
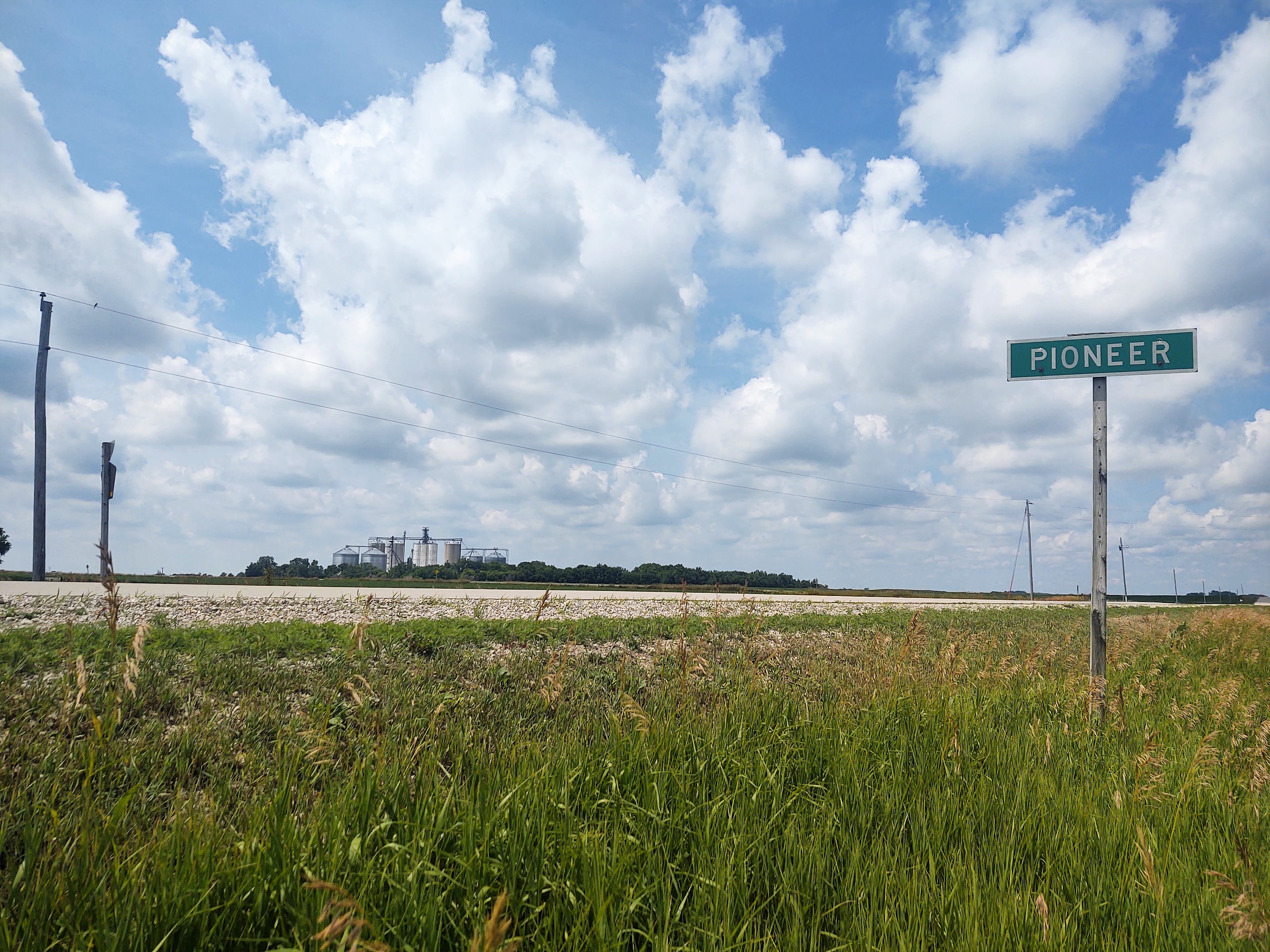
- Pioneer, June 2012

- Location of Pioneer, Iowa
- Coordinates: 42°39′16″N 94°23′27″W
- Country: United States
- State: Iowa
- County: Humboldt
- Discontinued: August 12, 2020
- Named after: Pioneers

Area
  - Total: 0.062 sq mi (0.16 km^{2})
  - Land: 0.062 sq mi (0.16 km^{2})
  - Water: 0 sq mi (0.00 km^{2})
- Elevation: 1,184 ft (361 m)

Population (2020)
  - Total: 4
  - Density: 65/sq mi (25/km^{2})
- Time zone: UTC-6 (Central (CST))
  - Summer (DST): UTC-5 (CDT)
- ZIP code: 50541
- Area code: 515
- FIPS code: 19-62985
- GNIS feature ID: 0460180

Pioneer is an unincorporated community in Humboldt County, Iowa, United States. The population was 4 at the time of the 2020 census, and elected to unincorporate as a municipality in 2020.

== Geography ==
Pioneer is located at 42°39′16″N 94°23′27″W (42.654422, -94.390775).

According to the United States Census Bureau, the city has a total area of 0.06 square miles (0.16 km^{2}), all land.

== Demographics ==
Historical population
Census	Pop.	Note	%±
1910	92		—
1920	84		−8.7%
1930	98		16.7%
1940	129		31.6%
1950	83		−35.7%
1960	76		−8.4%
1970	56		−26.3%
1980	40		−28.6%
1990	46		15.0%
2000	21		−54.3%
2010	23		9.5%
2020	4		−82.6%
U.S. Decennial Census and Iowa Data Center

=== 2020 census ===
As of the census of 2020, there were 4 people, 0 households, and 0 families residing in the city. The population density was 48.5 inhabitants per square mile (18.7/km^{2}). There were 5 housing units at an average density of 60.7 per square mile (23.4/km^{2}). The racial makeup of the city was 75.0% White, 0.0% Black or African American, 0.0% Native American, 0.0% Asian, 0.0% Pacific Islander, 0.0% from other races and 25.0% from two or more races. Hispanic or Latino persons of any race comprised 0.0% of the population.

The median age in the city was 61.0 years. 25.0% of the residents were under the age of 20; 0.0% were between the ages of 20 and 24; 0.0% were from 25 and 44; 50.0% were from 45 and 64; and 25.0% were 65 years of age or older. The gender makeup of the city was 25.0% male and 75.0% female.

=== 2010 census ===
As of the census of 2010, there were 23 people, 8 households, and 6 families living in the city. The population density was 383.3 inhabitants per square mile (148.0/km^{2}). There were 9 housing units at an average density of 150.0 per square mile (57.9/km^{2}). The racial makeup of the city was 95.7% White and 4.3% African American.

There were 8 households, of which 25.0% had children under the age of 18 living with them, 62.5% were married couples living together, 12.5% had a male householder with no wife present, and 25.0% were non-families. 12.5% of all households were made up of individuals, and 12.5% had someone living alone who was 65 years of age or older. The average household size was 2.88 and the average family size was 3.33.

The median age in the city was 38.5 years. 26.1% of residents were under the age of 18; 8.6% were between the ages of 18 and 24; 26.1% were from 25 to 44; 21.6% were from 45 to 64; and 17.4% were 65 years of age or older. The gender makeup of the city was 56.5% male and 43.5% female.

=== 2000 census ===
As of the census of 2000, there were 21 people, 10 households, and 6 families living in the city. The population density was 333.1 inhabitants per square mile (128.6/km^{2}). There were 11 housing units at an average density of 174.5 per square mile (67.4/km^{2}). The racial makeup of the city was 100.00% White.

There were 10 households, out of which 20.0% had children under the age of 18 living with them, 50.0% were married couples living together, and 40.0% were non-families. 30.0% of all households were made up of individuals, and 20.0% had someone living alone who was 65 years of age or older. The average household size was 2.10 and the average family size was 2.67.

In the city, the population was spread out, with 19.0% under the age of 18, 9.5% from 18 to 24, 19.0% from 25 to 44, 33.3% from 45 to 64, and 19.0% who were 65 years of age or older. The median age was 52 years. For every 100 females, there were 162.5 males. For every 100 females age 18 and over, there were 112.5 males.

The median income for a household in the city was $19,375, and the median income for a family was $36,875. Males had a median income of $22,083 versus $21,250 for females. The per capita income for the city was $10,079. There are 28.6% of families living below the poverty line and 50.0% of the population, including 100.0% of under eighteens and none of those over 64.

== Government ==
At the time of discontinuance, Pioneer had a mayor and three city council members, which met monthly. The only city employee was the part-time city clerk. Though it has lowered its tax rate, city coffers turned over to the county at discontinuance were at "about $150,000".

== Infrastructure ==
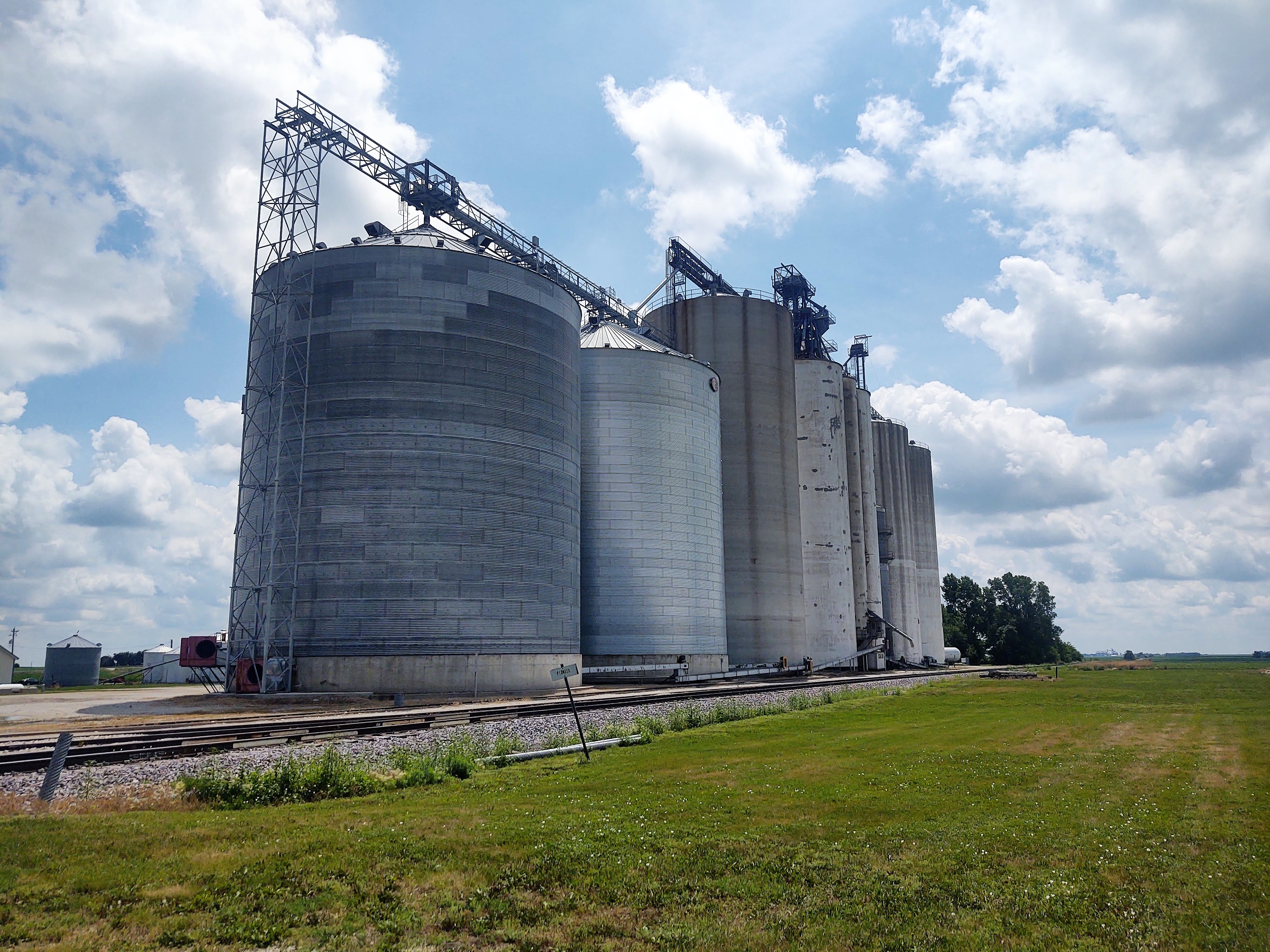
Grain bins in Pioneer, June 2021

=== Major highways ===
Pioneer is located just off Humboldt County Route C49, approximately 8.5 miles (13.7 km) west of US Route 169.

=== Utilities ===
Water service is provided by a county-owned well and water distribution system. As of 2020, the system had three residential customers and the Pro Cooperative grain elevator.

== Education ==
It is within the Gilmore City–Bradgate Community School District.

== Notable person ==
- Merle J. Isaac (1898–1996), arranger and composer
