= University of Iowa School of Music =

Music school in Iowa City, Iowa

- Type: Public
- Established: 1906
- Students: 450
- Location: Iowa City, Iowa, USA; 41.6575°N 91.5350°W
- Campus: Urban
- Director: Tammie Walker https://music.uiowa.edu/people/tammie-walker

The University of Iowa School of Music is a part of the Division of Performing Arts of the College of Liberal Art & Sciences. The school trains musicians for professional careers in performance, composition, music therapy, music theory, musicology, conducting, and music education. Admission to the school is selective, requiring students to be admitted to the university itself before being able to apply and audition for the school of music, at least at the undergraduate level.

== Programs of Study ==
=== Undergraduate ===
The school offers a Bachelor of Music degree with concentrations in performance, music therapy and composition as well as a Bachelor of Arts degree with a major in music and a music minor. Music majors with a performance concentration may elect to receive certification in music education, allowing them to teach public school. Additionally, an emphasis in jazz studies is also available to performance concentration students. Those with concentrations in music therapy gain certification in their field as part of the degree program.

=== Graduate/Postgraduate ===
Master of Arts, Master of Fine Arts, Doctor of Philosophy, and Doctor of Musical Arts degrees are all available. A certificate in sacred music is also available. Additionally, any graduate student in the school of music may earn a minor in theory pedagogy, designed to allow them to teach music theory at a college or conservatory level. Another option for some graduate students is to receive a Master of Arts degree en route to completing a Master of Fine Arts degree.

== Center for New Music ==
The Center for New Music, or TCNM, was founded by matching grants between the university and the Rockefeller Foundation for the purpose of performing and composing new music of the classical style. Its current director is pianist, conductor, composer, and professor, David K. Gompper.

== Notable faculty ==
- Himie Voxman, Director 1954–1980
- Uriel Tsachor, Piano (Department Head)
- Ksenia Nosikova, Piano
- Alan Huckleberry, Piano Pedagogy & Collaborative Piano
- David Gier, Trombone and former Director (now at Michigan)
- Marian Wilson Kimber, Musicology
- Kenneth Tse, Saxophone
- Rachel Joselson, Soprano
- Stephen Swanson, Baritone
- Benjamin Coelho, Bassoon
- Nicole Esposito, Flute
- Courtney Miller, Oboe
- Dan Moore, Percussion
- Philip Greeley Clapp, Director 1919-1953
