= Merle J. Isaac =

American composer and arranger (1898 – 1996)

- Born: October 12, 1898; Pioneer, Iowa
- Died: March 11, 1996 (aged 97); Des Plaines, Illinois
- Education: Bachelor of Musical Education, Vandercook College of Music; Bachelor of Science, Lewis Institute
- Occupations: Composer, music arranger, clinician, conductor
- Children: 1

Merle John Isaac (October 12, 1898 – March 11, 1996) was an American composer and prolific arranger who focused on arranging famous pieces for performers of lower experience, especially school orchestras.

== Early life and education ==
Isaac was born in Pioneer, Iowa on October 12, 1898 to William P. and Elizabeth J. Isaac. Merle was of Welsh and Scottish descent; his mother emigrated from Scotland as a child his paternal grandparents were Welsh. Shortly before 1900, the Isaac family moved from Iowa to Illinois. As a young child, Merle lived in the countryside and was educated in a one-room schoolhouse. Later, the family moved to Chicago. When he went to school there, he encountered fourth-grade students who could sing solfege and read music. Unfamiliar with music, he started receiving instruction from church organist and piano teacher Mary Carnduff. Isaac's parents later bought a piano and he continued studying piano and organ with Carnduff until he finished eighth grade.

Isaac attended Crane High School and pursued various musical endeavors there. As a freshman, he sang in the glee club. The following year, he sang a solo in the school's production of Gilbert and Sullivan's comic opera H.M.S. Pinafore. Isaac then desired to play in the school orchestra on piano. However, he switched to flute and taught himself how to play it after he realized the orchestra already had a piano player. For the two years he played flute, he was the only flautist in the orchestra. In addition to the Crane High School orchestra, Isaac was a pianist for an elementary school orchestra and a pump organist and flautist for Sunday school orchestras.

Isaac waited three years after graduating high school before he decided to matriculate. During that time, he worked for a printing company office and later for Western Electric Company. He also continued to practice piano and flute and received further instruction in piano. Isaac enrolled at Crane Junior College, now known as Malcolm X College. After attending classes there in the morning, he dedicated his afternoons to practicing the church organ. This led him to a weekend job accompanying silent films on organ at movie theaters in the area. Isaac was hired at one theater on December 26 after the previous organist missed Christmas day. After a few months working there, he switched to a theater closer to home which showed daily matinees. To keep up with the quickly changing mood of the film, he often memorized or improvised the soundtrack. He began writing down his improvised melodies and the different registrations he used. During this time, Isaac also began studying organ, harmony, and counterpoint with J. Lewis Browne. Isaac's theater organ experience enhanced his understanding of harmony, facilitating his later career as an orchestral arranger.

== Music and recognition ==
After graduating from the VanderCook College of Music in 1932, he began to teach at John Marshall High School, in Chicago, Illinois. While he was there, Isaac realized that there was little good music available to lower-level orchestras, and began to arrange music for his orchestra, beginning with Bohm's Perpetual Motion. After 35 years working in Chicago area schools, he retired from education, though he continued to be a clinician and guest conductor around the United States, and also continued arranging. In 1993, the American String Teachers Association gave Isaac a lifetime achievement award, and annually through 1997 continued giving awards under his name. They also have an annual Merle J. Isaac composition contest to "encourage the composition, publication, and performance of music of quality for the benefit of school orchestra programs."

== Personal life ==
Isaac's family included his wife, Margaret, and their daughter, Margrethe.

Isaac died of natural causes on March 11, 1996, in Des Plaines, Illinois, at the age of 97.
