= Hugo Rüter =

German composer

Hugo Rüter (7 September 1859 – 25 December 1949) was a German composer.

Born in Hamburg, he studied at the Conservatory of his hometown and later settled down in Wandsbek as director of choral societies, being appointed in 1897 as a teacher of Matthias-Claudius-Gymnasium. He died in Mieste.

His father Christian was a foreman in a sailmaker's shop at the port. He had come into contact with music from early childhood through the nearby Michaeliskirche. The family later moved to Wandsbek, where Hugo attended school. Then Rüter went to the middle school at the Lärmberg. After confirmation in 1873, he left school and, on the advice of his teacher Scheibler, began training for the teaching profession. At the age of 15, he got a job as a preparatory at the Protestant church school in the neighbouring town of Hamm. At the age of 15 he learned to play the piano, but his talent was singing. At the age of 17 he passed the entrance exam at the Bernuthsche Konservatorium in Hamburg-Hamm. There he studied from 1876 to 1882 with Carl Georg Peter Graedener, Hugo Riemann, Karl F. Armbrust, Carl Louis Bargheer and Heinrich Degenhardt. In 1880 he wrote his 1st symphony in C sharp minor. Hugo Rüter's work is quite extensive.

Rüter lived in Hamburg-Hamm on the 2nd floor of the house at Kampstraße 84, which was renamed "Rüterstraße" in his honor in 1951.

== Works ==
A significant portion of Rüter's work was destroyed on 30 July 1943 in the Bombing of Hamburg in World War II, including his first, fourth, fifth, sixth, and seventh symphonies. A number of other works have gone unaccounted for since the death of his son, Raimund, in 1968. Most of his surviving manuscripts are preserved in the Schleswig-Holsteinische Landesbibliothek in Kiel.

- Kaiser-Ouverture, with the choir of men
- Three operas: Frau Inge, Eulenspiegel, Die Schildbürger
- Incidental music for three tragedies by Sophocles King Oedipus, Antigone, Phyloctetes
- Incidental music for one tragedy by Euripides Alkestis
- Seven symphonies
- Violin concerto
- Sextet for two violins, two violas and two cellos
- Seven quintets for strings and woodwinds
- Six string quartets
- Five trios
- Three canonical suites for violin and viola
- 20 sonatas for violin and piano
- 12 sonatas for viola and piano
- Three sonatinas for violin and viola
- Three sonatas for flute and piano
- Two romances for violin and piano
- Duets for violin and guitar
- Sonata for clarinet and piano
- Sonata for horn and piano
- Two sonatinas for piano four hands and cello
- Pieces for piano, including 12 sonatas, three sonatas for piano four hands and three sonatinas
- Organ works
- Choral music
- Lieder
- Piano school
