= Heinrich Ernst Kayser =

Heinrich Ernst Kayser (16 April 1815 in Altona, Hamburg – 17 January 1888 in Hamburg) was a German violinist, violist, pedagogue and composer.
