= Jakob Dont =

Austrian violinist

Jakob Dont (March 2, 1815 – November 17, 1888) was an Austrian violinist, composer, and teacher.

He was born and died in Vienna. His father Valentin Dont was a noted cellist. Jakob was a student of Josef Böhm (1795–1876) and of Georg Hellmesberger (1800–1873). At the age of sixteen, he became a member of the Hofburgtheater orchestra and in 1834 entered service at the Vienna Hofkapelle. During this time Dont appeared frequently as a soloist. Despite his success, he decided against a career as a soloist. In 1853 he became a professor at the Pädagogisches Institut in Vienna. From 1871, Dont was employed at the Wiener Konservatorium. He would eventually leave this post as the use of his own instructional compositions was forbidden. Dont's compositions are mainly limited to innovative teaching material. His 24 Etudes and Caprices Gradus ad parnassum Op. 35 and the 24 Exercises Preparatory to the Studies of R. Kreutzer and P. Rode Op. 37 are considered some of the most important technical studies for the violin.

Among his students was Leopold Auer. See: List of music students by teacher: C to F#Jakob Dont.

== Selected works ==
Caprice Dont Mib Major
Performed by David Hernando

Concertante

- 3 Caprices de concert for violin and orchestra, Op. 40 (1858)
- Morceau de concert in D minor for violin and orchestra, Op. 41 (1855)

Chamber music

- Introduction et variations brillantes in E major for violin and piano, Op. 21 (1844)
- Potpourri on Themes from the Opera "Alessandro Stradella" by Friedrich von Flotow for violin and piano (1846)
- Potpourri on Themes from the Opera "La part du diable" by Daniel Auber for violin and piano (1847)
- Potpourri on Themes from the Opera "Das Nachtlager in Granada" by Conradin Kreutzer for violin and piano (1846–1847)
- Potpourri on Themes from the Opera "Ernani" by Giuseppe Verdi for violin and piano (1847)
- Potpourri on Themes from the Opera "Die Zigeunerin" by Michael William Balfe for violin and piano (1848)
- Introduction et rondeau brillant for violin and piano, Op. 34 (1849)
- Introduction et variations (Introduction und Variationen) in A major for violin and piano, Op. 36 (1848)
- Potpourri on Themes from the Opera "Der Förster" (L'âme en peine) by Friedrich von Flotow for violin and piano (1852)
- Potpourri on Themes from the Opera "Rigoletto" by Giuseppe Verdi for violin and piano (1855)
- Potpourri on Themes from the Opera "Macbeth" by Giuseppe Verdi for violin and piano (1856)
- Quartet in E minor for 4 violins, Op. 42 (1859)
- Duo in C major for 2 violins, Op. 43 (published 1869)
- Quartet in F major for 4 violins, Op. 45 (published 1864)
- Duo in A minor for 2 violins, Op. 48 (published 1870)

Piano

- 3 Mazurkas, Op. 24
- Polonaise, Op. 31 (1850)
- Jubel-Marsch zur Feier der glorreichen Schlacht bei Novara, Op. 32 (1850)

Pedagogical works

- Easy Exercises in All Major and Minor Keys (Leichte Übungen in allen Dur- und Molltonarten) for violin with accompaniment of a second violin, Op. 17 (1854)
- 5 Caprices for violin, Op. 18 (published 1840)
- 3 Caprices for violin, Op. 20 (1842)
- Gradus ad Parnassum: Easy Duettinas for Use as Practice Pieces for Beginners (Leichte Duettinen zur Gebrauch als Übungsstücke für Anfänger) for 2 violins, Op. 26 (1851)
- 4 Etudes for violin, Op. 30 (1847)
- 6 Etudes for violin, Op. 33 (1849)
- 24 Etudes et Caprices for violin, Op. 35 (1849)
- Gradus ad Parnassum: 24 Etudes and Caprices (Etüden und Capricen) for violin, Opp. 18, 20, 30, 33, 35 (collection published 1849)
- Gradus ad Parnassum: 24 Preparatory Exercises to Kreutzer and Rode Etudes (24 Vorübungen zu R. Kreutzer's und P. Rode's Etüden) for violin, Op. 37 (1852)
- Gradus ad Parnassum: 20 Progressive Exercises (20 fortschreitende Übungen) for violin with accompaniment of a second violin, Op. 38 (1854)
- Scales (Die Tonleitern in allen Dur- und Molltonarten sammt den Intervallen in Form kleiner melodischer, progressiv aufsteigender Übungsstücke) for violin, Op. 39 (1854)
- Supplement to Kreutzer's "Etudes or Caprices" (Anhang zu R. Kreutzer's Etüden oder Capricen) (published 1857, 1860)

Book I: Erläuterung und Euleichterung der Nr. 1, 14–22
Book II: Zweite Violine als Begleitungsstimme der Etuden oder Capricen, No. 1–20

- Theoretical and Practical Contribution to Supplement Violin Methods and Facilitate Teaching (Theoretische und praktische Beiträge zur Ergänzung der Violinschulen, und zur Erleichterung des Unterrichts) for violin, Op. 49 (published from 1873); 8 volumes
- 12 Übungen aus der Violinschule von L. Spohr, mit erläuternden Anmerkungen, Ergänzungen des Fingersatzes, der Bogenstricharten und der Tonschattirungen (published 1875)
- Gradus ad Parnassum: Collection of Polyphonic Music for Practice in Ensemble Playing (Sammlung mehrstimmiger Musikstücke zur Übung im Ensemblespiel) for violins (or with viola, or viola and cello), Op. 52 (1877); 6 volumes
- Gradus ad Parnassum: 6 Studies (6 Studien: In Anschluss an Op. 35 Etudes et Caprices) for violin, Op. 54 (published 1887); supplement to Op. 35
- Gradus ad Parnassum: 6 Caprices (6 Capricen) for violin, Op. 55 (posthumous work, published 1891); supplement to Op. 35
- Scales and Cadenzas with Systematic Fingering and Position Changes (Die Skalen und Kadenzen mit systematischem Fingersatz und Lagenwechsel) for violin, Op. 60 (1882)
- Gradus ad Parnassum: Caprices and Cadenzas (Capricen und Cadenzen) for violin, Op. 61 (1882)
- Exercises in the Art of Bowing with Shifting in the First Three Positions (Bogenstrichart-Übungen mit Wechsel der ersten drei Lagen) for 2 violins, Op. 62

Cadenzas

- 3 Cadenzas to Ludwig van Beethoven's Violin Concerto, Op. 61 (1888)

Vocal

- Der blinde Geiger, Romanze von Rappaport for voice and piano, Op. 28 (1841)
- Wand'rers Liebesschmerz, Wanderlied von Johann Nepomuk Vogl for voice and piano, Op. 29 (1841)
- 2 Gedichte von J.N. Vogl (2 Poems by J.N. Vogl) for 4 male voices (1842); words by Johann Nepomuk Vogl

1. Die Abendglocke
2. Am Grabe der Gelieben

- Herbsmelancholie for voice and piano (1947); words by Johann Nepomuk Vogl
- Gott im Ungewitter for voice and piano, Op. 22 (published 1853)
- Die Bleicherin for voice and piano, Op. 23 (published 1851); words by Ludwig August von Frankl
- Auf der Brücke for voice and piano, Op. 27 (1851); words by Johann Nepomuk Vogl
- 4 Gesänge (4 Songs) for soprano or tenor and piano (1873)

1. An den Abendstern: „O nimm mich auf“
2. Wiegenlied: „Die Nacht ist gekommen“
3. Wanderlied: „Wohin ich nur wand're“
4. Zigeunerlied: „Es feget die Haide“

- Das Grab for bass and piano (1873)

Choral

- Im deutschen Geist und Herzen sind wir ein's for male chorus (1887)
- Der Herr ist groß, Double Chorus for male voices (1888)
