= Mikhail Bukinik =

Ukrainian cellist, composer, music educator and music critic

Mikhail Evseevich Bukinik (Ukrainian: Михайло Євсійович Букінік; Russian: Михаил Евсеевич Букиник; 10 November 1872 [O.S. 29 October] – 22 July 1953) was a cellist, composer, music educator and music critic. Born in the Russian Empire, in present-day Ukraine, he pursued a career as a soloist, chamber musician and teacher in Russia and Western Europe before settling in the United States. His compositions include concert études, preludes and technical exercises for the cello, as well as transcriptions of works by other composers.

== Biography ==
=== Early life and musical training ===
Bukinik was born in 1872. Published biographical reference works have traditionally identified his birthplace as Dubno, then part of the Russian Empire and now in Rivne Oblast, Ukraine. His older brother, Isaac Bukinik, was a violinist, teacher and music writer.

In 1885 Bukinik entered the music school of the Kharkiv branch of the Russian Musical Society, where he studied cello with Alfred von Glehn. When von Glehn moved to the Moscow Conservatory in 1890, Bukinik continued his studies there under the same teacher. He graduated in 1895, receiving a silver medal, a cello and financial assistance for further study abroad.

During his Moscow years, Bukinik became acquainted with musicians who would later occupy prominent positions in Russian musical life. His circle included Sergei Rachmaninoff, Alexander Scriabin and pianist Alexander Goldenweiser. As a chamber musician he performed with artists including Sergei Taneyev, Konstantin Igumnov, Goldenweiser, Alexander Goedicke and violinist Boris Sibor.

=== Saratov and European career ===
Following his conservatory studies, Bukinik toured as a performer and spent time in Berlin. In 1899 he moved to Saratov, where he taught at the music school of the Russian Musical Society until 1904. He also taught music theory and choral singing at the Mariinsky Institute. Alongside his teaching responsibilities, he organized concerts, performed chamber music and contributed music criticism to the local press.

Saratov also brought Bukinik into contact with artists and writers outside the musical profession. In 1900 he met the painter Viktor Borisov-Musatov, with whom he formed a close friendship. Their shared interest in music and the arts led to frequent visits, and Bukinik sometimes played the cello in the painter's studio. Borisov-Musatov, in turn, produced drawings associated with Bukinik's musical activities, including concert posters. Both men participated in the informal artistic circle known as the English Club, which also included the writer Vladimir Stanyukovich and his wife Nadezhda.

Between 1904 and 1906 Bukinik spent time in Germany, France and Switzerland, performing and promoting Russian music. He subsequently returned to the Moscow musical scene, where chamber music remained an important part of his professional activity.

=== Teaching and performing in Moscow and Kharkiv ===
Bukinik was associated with several important musical institutions in Moscow. The history of the Gnessin music school records that its cello class was established under his direction in 1905. He also taught at the Moscow People's Conservatory from 1907 to 1918.

During these years, Bukinik appeared in chamber concerts associated with the Russian Musical Society and the Circle of Lovers of Russian Music. He also participated in efforts to organize professional musicians and promote chamber music. His work combined performing, teaching, arranging and criticism rather than concentrating exclusively on a solo career.

From 1919 to 1922 he was a professor at the Kharkiv Conservatory. In 1921 he also held administrative positions in musical education in Kharkiv, including serving as dean of a performance faculty.

=== Later years in the United States ===
Bukinik left Soviet Ukraine in 1922 and subsequently lived in the United States. Published biographical accounts record his participation in a Ukrainian string quartet and in Ukrainian musical theater. He continued to be active as a musician and writer after leaving Europe.

An important part of Bukinik's literary activity consisted of recollections of the musicians and artistic circles he had known in Russia. His memoir of the young Rachmaninoff was published in the New York memorial volume Pamyati Rachmaninova (In Memory of Rachmaninoff) in 1946. He also contributed music criticism to publications including Russkaya muzykalnaya gazeta, Muzykalny truzhenik and Saratovsky listok.

Bukinik died in New York on 22 July 1953. Some older reference works incorrectly give 1947 as his year of death.

== Compositions and pedagogical works ==
Bukinik composed a variety of works for the cello, ranging from concert pieces to technical studies. His best-known compositions are the Four Concert Études for unaccompanied cello, which combine technical demands with the character of concert works. A modern edition prepared by cellist Julius Berger was published by Schott Music in 2004. According to the publisher, the études were required works at the International Cello Competition in Markneukirchen in May 2005.

His other publications include Ten Preludes for solo cello, studies devoted to shifting and arpeggios, and chamber music. He also arranged compositions by Pyotr Ilyich Tchaikovsky, Anton Rubinstein, Vasily Kalinnikov and Eduard Nápravník, contributing to the cello repertoire through both original works and transcriptions.

== Selected works ==
=== Original compositions ===
- Four Concert Études, for solo cello
- Ten Preludes, for solo cello
- Six petits morceaux, Op. 9, for cello and piano
- Fantaisie, Op. 11, for cello and double bass

=== Pedagogical works ===
- Virtuoso Arpeggio Studies, for cello
- New Shifting Studies, Op. 13, for cello
