= Wolfgang Suppan =

Austrian musicologist

Wolfgang Suppan (5 August 1933 – 4 May 2015) was an Austrian musicologist. He is the father of the wind musician and composer Armin Suppan.

== Career ==
Born in Irdning, Suppan studied music at the Johann-Joseph-Fux-Conservatory Graz and musicology (Hellmut Federhofer), folklore with (Viktor Geramb, Hanns Koren) and philosophy (Amadeo Silva-Tarouca) at the University of Graz. In 1959, he was awarded a Dr. phil. In 1961, he went to Freiburg im Breisgau as a scholarship holder of the Deutsche Forschungsgemeinschaft, first to the Institute for East German Folklore, and since 1963 to the Deutsches Volksliedarchiv as a musicological consultant. In 1971, he received his habilitation for musicology at the University of Mainz. In 1974, he accepted a call to the Institute for Music Ethnology at the University of Music and Performing Arts Graz. Assistant professorships took him to the University of Göttingen in 1991/92, to Innsbruck in 1992/93 and to Salzburg in 1991/92 and 1996/97. He has also held lectureships and guest professorships at the Institute for Music Pedagogy at the University of Frankfurt, at the Aarhus University, the Columbia University, the University of Texas at Austin, among others, and the Bar-Ilan University. He retired in 2001.

== Boards ==
Suppan co-founded and directed a number of international societies: in 1955 the Johann Joseph Fux Society (1995 to 2001 President), in 1967 the Study Group for the Research of Historical Folk Music Sources in the ICTM (co-chair until 1988), in 1965 the International Society for Jazzforschung (since then advisory board), 1974 the International Society for the Research and Promotion of Wind Music (President until 2000), in 1981 the World Association for Symphonic Bands and Ensembles (President from 1995 to 1997). He was a member of the Presidium of the Deutscher Musikrat from 1973 to 1978 and of the ISME Research Commission from 1975 to 1981. His main areas of work included the anthropology of music, European ethnomusicology, brass music research and the history of music in Austria. From 1996 to 2006, he was also the head of the Styrian Brass Music Association.

Suppan died in Graz at the age of 79.

== Awards ==
- 1978: Großes Ehrenzeichen des Landes Steiermark
- 1984: Forschungspreis des Landes Steiermark
- 1994: Officer's cross of the Order of Merit of the Federal Republic of Germany
- 1994: Decoration of Honour for Services to the Republic of Austria
- Honorary citizen of Pürgg-Trautenfels

== Publications ==
=== Books ===
- Steirisches Musiklexikon. Graz 1962–1966.
- Volkslied. Seine Sammlung und Erforschung. Stg. 1966
- Otto Siegl. Eine Studie. Vienna 1966.
- Deutsches Liedleben zwischen Renaissance und Barock. Habilitationsschrift Mainz 1971, gedruckt Tutzing 1973.
- Das neue Lexikon des Blasmusikwesens (mit Armin Suppan). Schulz, Freiburg 1973. ISBN 3-923058-07-1.
- Jenö Takács. Dokumente, Analysen, Kommentare. Eisenstadt 1977.
- Der musizierende Mensch. Eine Anthropologie der Musik. Schott, Mainz 1983, ISBN 3-7957-1709-4.
- Blasmusik in Baden. Musikverlag Schulz, Freiburg 1983, ISBN 3-923058-02-0.
- Musica humana. Die anthropologische und kulturethologische Dimension der Musikwissenschaft. Vienna among others. 1986, ISBN 3-205-06568-9.
- Komponieren für Amateure. Tutzing 1987, ISBN 3-7952-0528-X.
- Texte und Melodien der "Erlauer Spiele". Tutzing 1990 (with J. Janota).
- Werk und Wirkung. Musikwissenschaft als Menschen- und Kulturgüterforschung. 3 volumes, Tutzing 2000.
- Blasmusikland Steiermark. Gnas/Steiermark 2003, ISBN 3-7059-0176-1.
- Blasmusikforschung Bibliographie 1966–2003. Schneider, Tutzing 2003.
- Steirisches Musiklexikon. 2nd, completely revised and extended edition; Akademische Druck- und Verlagsanstalt, Graz 2009, ISBN 978-3-201-01888-3.
- Blasmusik in der Steiermark. Musik klingt und berührt die Herzen. Ein Beitrag zur landeskundlichen Musikforschung, Weishaupt-Verlag, Gnas 2010, ISBN 978-3-7059-0312-8.
- An der Wiege des Landes Steiermark. Die Chronik Pürgg-Trautenfels. Mit Beiträgen von Gottfried Allmer, Walter Brunner, Wilhelm Deuer, Josef Hasitschka, Ingo Mirsch, Hannes P. Naschenweng, Armin und Wolfgang Suppan. Weishaupt-Verlag, Gnas/Steiermark 2013, ISBN 978-3-7059-0344-9.

=== Editions ===
- Deutsche Volkslieder mit ihren Melodien. Balladen. Vol. 5 and 6, Freiburg im Breisgau 1967 and 1976 (with R. W. Brednich, W. Heiske).
- Gottscheer Volkslieder. Gesamtausgabe, 3 volumes, Mainz 1969, 1972 and 1984 (with R. W. Brednich).
- Die Ebermannstädter Liederhandschrift. Kulmbach 1972 (with R. W. Brednich).
- Handbuch des Volksliedes. 2 volumes, München 1973 und 1975 (with R. W. Brednich and L. Röhrich).
- Alta musica. Eine Publikation der Internationalen Gesellschaft zur Erforschung und Förderung der Blasmusik. 23 volumes, Tutzing 1976–2002 (with E. Brixel).
- Melodietypen des deutschen Volksgesanges. Vol. 1, Tutzing 1976 (with W. Stief).
- Liszt-Studien. VOl. 1, Kgr.Ber. Eisenstadt 1975, Graz 1977.
- Musikethnologische Sammelbände. 19 volumes, Graz/Tutzing 1977–2004.
- Goethe. Heidenröslein[-Vertonungen]. 2 volumes, Tokio 1987 (with H. Sakanishi).
- Musica Pannonica. 4 volumes, Oberschützen – Budapest 1991–2000 (with Z. Falvy).

==== Notes ====
- J. J. Fux, Pulcheria, in J.-J.-Fux-Gesamtausgabe V/2, Kassel etc. 1967 (with H. Federhofer).
- E. von Lannoy, Grand Trio für Klar., Vc. nd Kl., L. 1970.
- I. Pleyel, 6 Duette für zwei Klar., Wolfenbüttel 1973.
- W. A. Mozart, 6 Duos für zwei Klar., KV Anh. 159f., Freiburg im Breisgau 1982

=== Articles ===
- Die Lage der Volksmusikforschung in den deutschsprachigen Ländern. In AMl. Vol. 37, 1965, pp. 1–19 (with F. Hoerburger).
- Zur Musik der „Erlauer Spiele“. In SM. Vol. 11, 1969, pp. 409–421.
- Bürgerliches und bäuerliches Musizieren in Mittelalter und früher Neuzeit. In Musikgeschichte Österreichs. Vol.1, Graz among others 1977, pp. 143–172.
- Musikethnologische Forschungen auf den Färöer-Inseln. In AMl. Vol. 49, 1977, pp. 49–68.
- Franz Liszt – zwischen F. von Hausegger und E. Hanslick. In SM. vol. 24, 1982, pp. 113–131.
- Musikforschung in und für Japan. In AMl. Vol. 54, 1982, pp. 84–123.
- Biologische Voraussetzungen und Grenzen kultureller Traditionsbildung. In Traditiones. Band 19, Ljubljana 1990, pp. 145–165.
- Ansätze und Ideen zur Anthropologie der Musik. In Orbis Musicae. Vol. 10: Essays in Honor of Hanoch Avenary. Tel Aviv 1990/91, pp. 248–271.
- Die Pittsburgh Ouverture (1967) by K. Penderecki. In Contexts of Musicology. Vol. 1: Dedicated to Jan Stęszewski, Poznán 1997, pp. 45–57.
- Early Ideas in the Anthropology of Music. In Studies in Socio-Musicology Sciences. George Herzog in Memoriam. Ramat Gan (Tel-Aviv) 1998, pp. 83–90.
- La Antropología Musical: Informe sobre sus objetivos y trabajos de investigación. In AnM. Vol. 53, Barcelona 1998, pp. 257–273.
- Bläsermusik an den Zentren fürstlicher und städtischer Musikpflege in Renaissance und Barock im südwestdeutsch-alemannischen Raum. In Annales. Vol. 2, Tutzing 2001, pp. 107–134.
- Die Funktion der Musik im Leben der Bürger und Bauern Tirols im Mittelalter und in der beginnenden Neuzeit. In Musikgeschichte Tirols. Innsbruck 2001, pp. 669–696.
- Benjamin Rajeczky und die historische Volksmusikforschung. In SM. Vol. 42, 2001, pp. 259–278.
- Musik als Identifikator. In Musik als … Ausgewählte Betrachtungsweisen. Edited by R. Flotzinger, Veröffentlichungen der Kommission für Musikforschung der Österreichischen Akademie der Wissenschaften, Vol. 28, Vienna 2006, pp. 115–132.
- Johann Joseph Fux zu Wolfgang Amadeus Mozart. In Jahresgabe der J.-J.-Fux-Gesellschaft. Vol. 17, Graz 1994
