= 42 études ou caprices =

Violin pieces composed by Rodolphe Kreutzer

The 42 études ou caprices ("42 études or capriccios") for solo violin were composed by Rodolphe Kreutzer around 1796. While Kreutzer was a prolific composer with some 50 stage works and dozens of other pieces to his credit, he is best known as a pedagogue. Together with Pierre Baillot and Pierre Rode, he was at the center of the development of the French school of violin playing around the turn of the 19th century, which defined much of the 19th-century (and hence the modern) approach to playing the violin.

The 42 études have remained a core part of the teaching repertoire since their publication, and are today perhaps the most common set of studies for intermediate and advanced students of the violin. They were written to demonstrate the possibilities of the Tourte bow, which was then innovative but has since been universally adopted, meaning Kreutzer's studies are highly applicable to the development of modern bowing technique. Another of Kreutzer's important didactic goals was developing fluency in contraction and extension of the left hand, which is also crucial to modern students of the violin.

The earliest extant edition of the collection, from 1807, comprises 40 pieces. Kreutzer's authorship is broadly accepted for two other études, nos. 13 and 25, that were included in some early editions. The etudes broadly form a logical pedagogic progression, though the relatively difficult Etude No. 1 appears out of place, perhaps placed at the beginning for publication to make the studies look more challenging at first glance. It is generally considered that the correct place to start is with Etude No. 2, which is the simplest study, and some editions, such as Frigyes Sándor's edition, re-order the pieces to correct this.

== List ==
The collection's contents is as follows:

- No. 1 in A minor, Adagio sostenuto
- No. 15 in B♭ major, Allegro non troppo
- No. 16 in D major, Moderato
- No. 17 in B♭ major, Maestoso (Moderato)
- No. 18 in G major, Moderato
- No. 19 in D major, Moderato
- No. 20 in A major, Allegro
- No. 21 in B minor, Moderato e sempre marcato
- No. 22 in A♭ major, Moderato
- No. 23 in B♭ major, Adagio (quasi Cadenza)
- No. 24 in G minor, Allegro
- No. 25 in G major, [Allegro moderato]
- No. 26 in E♭ major, Moderato
- No. 27 in D minor, Moderato
- No. 28 in E minor, Grave
- No. 29 in D major, Moderato
- No. 30 in B♭ major, Moderato
- No. 31 in C minor, Vivace
- No. 32 in F major, Andante
- No. 33 in F major, Andante
- No. 34 in D major, Moderato
- No. 35 in E♭ major, Marcia (Moderato)
- No. 36 in E minor, Allegretto
- No. 37 in F minor, Allegro vivace
- No. 38 in D major, Moderato
- No. 39 in A major, Allegretto
- No. 40 in B♭ major, Allegro
- No. 41 in F major, Adagio
- No. 42 in D minor, Allegro (Fuga)

Certain editions put the études in a different order, as follows:

Ordering of études
First edition (1805), Johann André (1835), Ferdinand David (1850) Friedrich Hermann (1870, 1880)	Hermann Schröder, Kistner (1889)	Lambert Massart, Alphonse Leduc (1893)	Edmund Singer, G. Schirmer (1894)	Henri Marteau, Steingräber Verlag (1913)	Frigyes Sándor, EMB (1960)
1	5	N/A	1	N/A	23
2	3	1	2	1	1
3	4	2	3	2	2
4	2	3	4	3	3
5	1	4	5	4	4
6	7	5	6	5	5
7	8	6	7	6	6
8	10	7	8	7	7
9	9	8	9	8	8
10	11	9	10	9	9
11	6	10	11	10	10
N/A	13	11	13	11	11
12	12	13	12	N/A	12
13	14	12	14	12	13
14	15	N/A	15	13	14
15	16	14	16	14	15
16	17	16	17	16	16
17	19	17	18	17	17
18	18	15	19	15	18
19	21	18	20	18	19
20	20	19	21	19	20
21	22	20	22	20	21
22	23	21	23	21	22
23	24	23	24	23	24
N/A	25	22	25	22	25
24	26	24	26	24	26
25	27	25	27	25	27
26	28	27	28	27	28
27	29	26	29	26	29
28	30	28	30	28	30
29	31	29	31	29	31
30	32	30	32	30	32
31	33	31	33	31	33
32	34	32	34	32	34
33	35	33	35	33	35
34	36	34	36	34	36
35	37	35	37	35	37
36	38	36	38	36	38
37	39	37	39	37	39
38	40	38	40	38	40
39	41	39	41	39	41
40	42	40	42	40	42
