= Jacques Féréol Mazas =

French composer, conductor, violinist and pedagogue (1782 - 1849)

For Mazas Prison, see here.

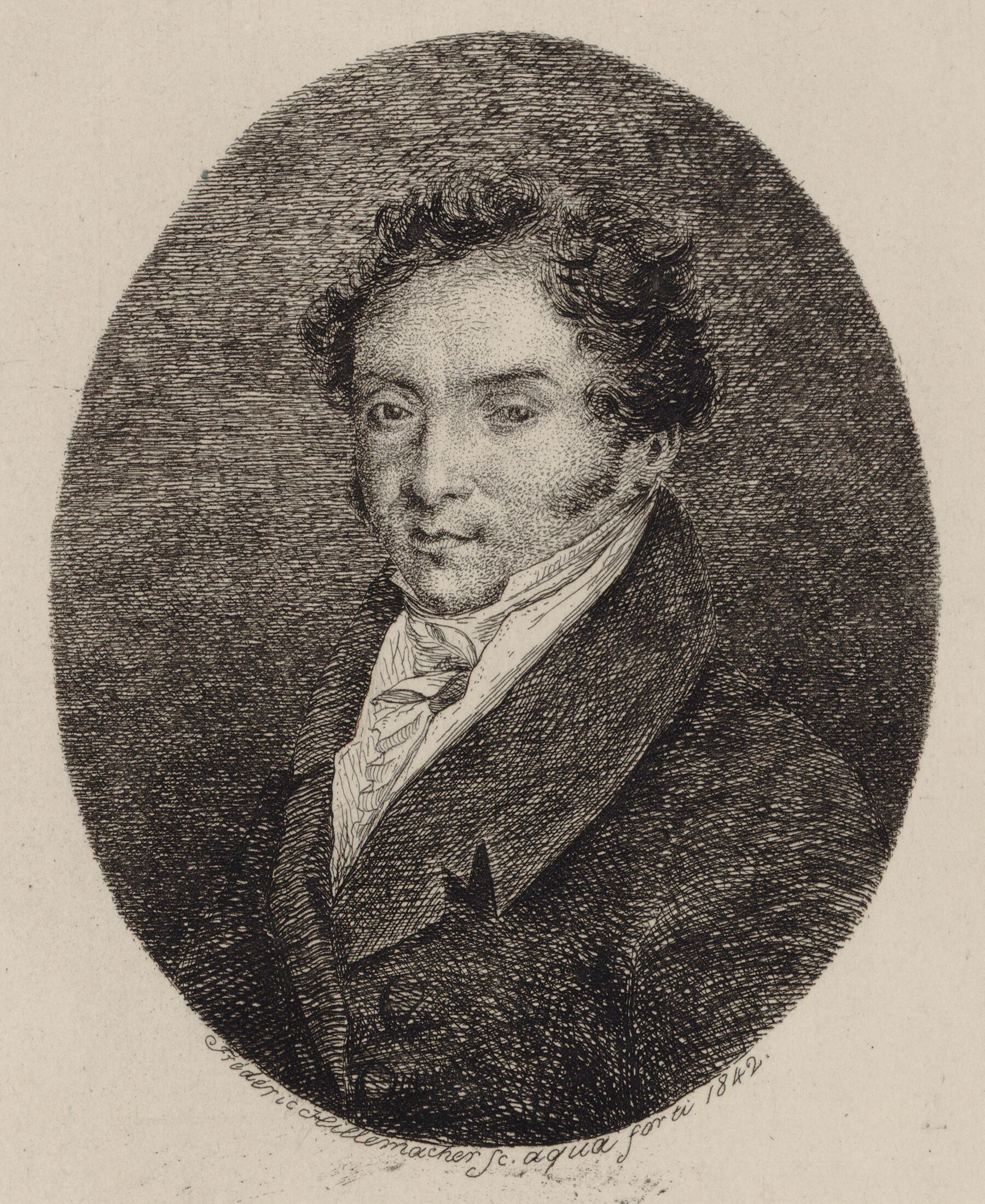
Jacques Féréol Mazas (ca. 1875), etching by Frédéric-Désiré Hillemacher. Bibliothèque nationale de France.

Jacques Féréol Mazas (23 September 1782 – 26 August 1849) was a French composer, conductor, violinist, and pedagogue.

== Biography ==
Born in Lavaur, Mazas was a pupil of Pierre Baillot at the Paris Conservatoire, from which he received the first prize in 1805. In 1808, he played a violin concerto dedicated to him by Auber. He then performed widely across Europe. In 1831, he accepted the post of first violin at the Théâtre du Palais-Royal. A short time later, he was appointed Directeur des concerts in Orléans, where he directed that city's Opéra Comique theatre. From 1837 to 1841, he was director of the Conservatoire in Cambrai.

He died in Bordeaux.

== Music ==
One of his operas, Le Kiosk had eight performances at the Opéra-Comique in Paris.

His compositions for violin are, for the most part, studies and duets for young string players of all abilities that constitute methods for both violin and viola.

== Selected works ==
- 3 Trios for 2 violins and cello (or viola), Op. 18
- La Consolation, Élégie No. 2 in G major for viola and orchestra (or piano), Op. 29 (1831)
- 75 Études mélodiques et progressives (in 3 parts), Op. 36
1. Études spéciales
2. Études brillantes
3. Études d'artistes (considered to be preparation for the 24 Caprices of Paganini)
- Duets for two violins, Op. 39
- Six easy duets for two violins dedicated to his pupils, Op. 61
- Six duets for two violins, Op. 71
- Élégie in C major for viola or cello and piano, Op. 73 (1838)
- Duet for 2 violins in G minor, Op. 86
- Le Songe (The Dream): Fantasy on a Theme from La favorite (Donizetti), Op. 92 for viola or viola d'amore and piano
- Rondeau du Freischütz (Weber), Op. 44/1
- Polonaise du Freischütz (Weber), Op. 45/1
- Polonaise on a theme by Rossini, Op. 45/2
- Opera: Corinne au capitole
- Comic opera: Mustapha
