= Armin Suppan =

Austrian composer

Armin Suppan (born 16 October 1959) is an Austrian brass musician and composer.

== Life ==
Born in Graz, son of the musicologist Wolfgang Suppan, Suppan studied music at the University of Music and Performing Arts Graz as well as at the Hochschule für Musik Detmold. In 1984, he received his diploma in French horn training with Michael Hoeltzel. In 1987, he completed additional studies in conducting and chamber music with Walter Hügler in Biel and Milan Turković in Vienna. Initially active as a conductor of wind orchestras in the South Baden area of Kappelrodeck, Ortenberg, he began his military bandmaster training in Austria in 1994. In 1999, Suppan passed the military bandmaster examination. In the same year he joined the teaching staff of the Johann-Joseph-Fux-Konservatorium Graz, where he heads the wind department and the wind music information centre. Suppan has gained international recognition as wind music expert and instrumentator for Symphonic Wind Orchestra.

== Compositions ==
- Johann-Joseph-Fux-Suite, Freiburg 1987, Schulz.
- Rondo für Schulorchester, für solistische Bläser und Streichquartett, Freiburg 1988, Schulz (Musik aus der Steiermark, issue 128).
- Schlossberg-Hymne, Freiburg 1988, Schulz.
- Wiener Barock-Ouvertüre, Bad Aussee 1993, Adler.
- Ortenberg-Fanfare, Bad Aussee 1996, Adler.
- Nordpol-Fanfare, Bad Aussee 1997, Adler.
- Dream Day. Festlicher Tagesanbruch, Bad Aussee 1998, Adler.
- Etüden und Vortragsstücke für Waldhorn, Freiburg 1980, Schulz.

== Writings ==
- Kongreßbericht Banská Bystrica 1998.
- Repertorium der Märsche für Blasorchester. 2 volumes, Tutzing 1982 and 1990 (Alta musica 6 and 13).
- Das Neue Lexikon des Blasmusikwesens. (with Wolfgang Suppan), 4th edition, Freiburg 1994, ISBN 3-923058-07-1.
