= Franz Wohlfahrt (composer) =

German violin teacher and composer

Franz Wohlfahrt (German pronunciation: [ˈfʁants ˈvoːlfaːɐ̯t]; 7 April 1833 – 14 March 1884) was a German violin teacher and composer based in Leipzig.

Wohlfahrt was born and died in Leipzig, where his father, Heinrich Wohlfahrt, was a piano teacher. He wrote a series of etudes, 60 Studies for Violin, Op. 45, which are often among the first ones studied by beginning violinists and violists. He was a student of Ferdinand David.
