= Rodolphe Kreutzer =

French violinist and composer (1766–1831)

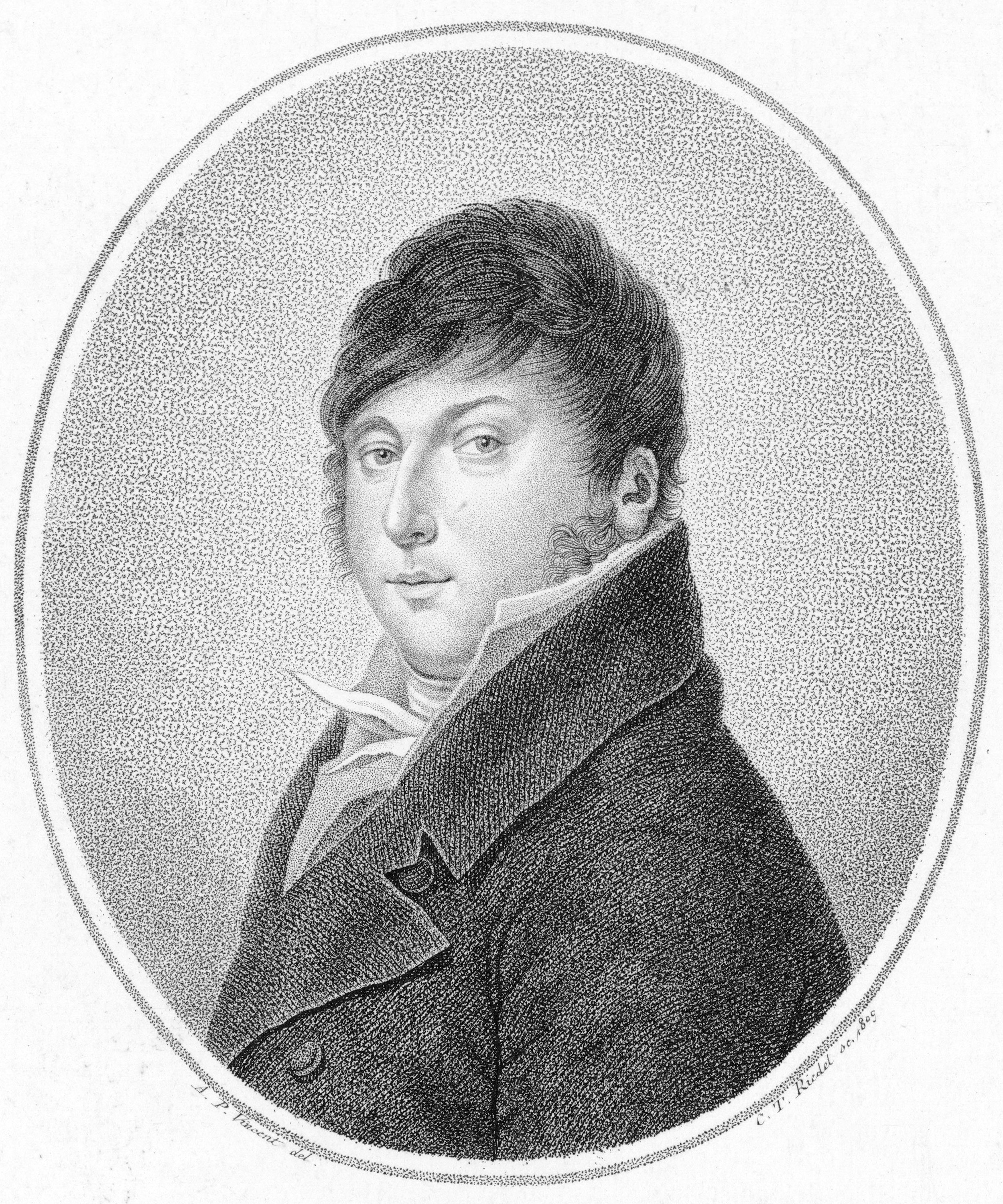
- Born: 15 November 1766; Versailles, France
- Died: 6 January 1831 (aged 64); Geneva, Switzerland
- Occupations: Violinist, Composer

Rodolphe Kreutzer (15 November 1766 – 6 January 1831) was a French violinist, teacher, conductor, and composer of forty French operas, including La mort d'Abel (1810).

He is probably best known as the dedicatee of Beethoven's Violin Sonata No. 9, Op. 47 (1803), known as the Kreutzer Sonata, though he never played the work. Kreutzer made the acquaintance of Beethoven in 1798, when at Vienna in the service of the French ambassador, Jean-Baptiste Bernadotte (later King of Sweden and Norway). Beethoven originally dedicated the sonata to George Bridgetower, the violinist at its first performance, but after a quarrel he revised the dedication in favour of Kreutzer.

== Biography ==
Kreutzer was born in Versailles, and was initially taught by his German father, who was a musician in the royal chapel, with later lessons from Anton Stamitz. He became one of the foremost violin virtuosos of his day, appearing as a soloist until 1810. He embedded with the Army of Italy under the command of Napoleon Bonaparte in 1797, charged with copying Italian musical manuscripts and returning them to France as trophies. He was a violin professor at the Conservatoire de Paris from its foundation in 1795 until 1826. He was co-author of the Conservatoire's violin method with Pierre Rode and Pierre Baillot, and the three are considered the founding trinity of the French school of violin playing. For a time, Kreutzer was leader of the Paris Opera, and from 1817 he conducted there, too. He died in Geneva and is buried in Paris at the Père Lachaise Cemetery.

== Work ==
Kreutzer was well known for his style of bowing, his splendid tone, and the clearness of his execution. His compositions include nineteen violin concertos and forty operas (including Jeanne d'Arc in Orléans 1790, Paul and Virginie 1791, Lodoïska 1791, Astianax 1801, Aristippe 1808 (dedicated to Hortense de Beauharnais), Abel, 1810). His best-known works, however, are the 42 études ou caprices (42 études or capricci, 1796) which are fundamental pedagogic studies.
