= Philip J. Bone =

English mandolin and guitar player

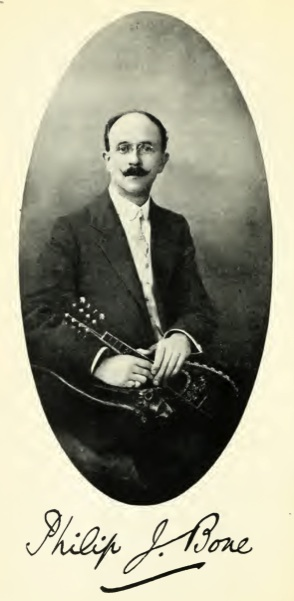
Philip J. Bone from his book The Guitar and Mandolin

Philip James Bone (29 January 1873 – 17 June 1964) was an English mandolinist and guitar player in the late 19th and early 20th centuries.

== Life ==
Bone was born and died in Luton. He studied guitar and mandolin with G. B. Marchiso at Trinity College of Music, London. Making fast progress, he was chosen to perform Beethoven's Sonata and Adagio for mandolin and piano at a college recital. He was also the founder and conductor of the Luton Mandolin Orchestra, "probably the first British mandolin orchestra to play on the mainland of Europe", conducted in Paris in 1909. In 1951, he became president of the British Federation of Banjoists, Mandolinists and Guitarists.

== The Guitar and Mandolin ==
While his day-to-day work was as a teacher and music dealer, he is remembered today as the author of the book The Guitar and Mandolin: Biographies of Celebrated Players and Composers for These Instruments, published by Schott and Augener (London, 1914). He was also a Medallist, Fellow of the Royal Society of Arts, London. Other honours given him include being a medallist at the International Music Contests in Bologne, medallist in the International Music Contest in France (1st Prize Honours), and medalist of the I.U.M. in London. He conducted of the Luton Mandolin Orchestra.

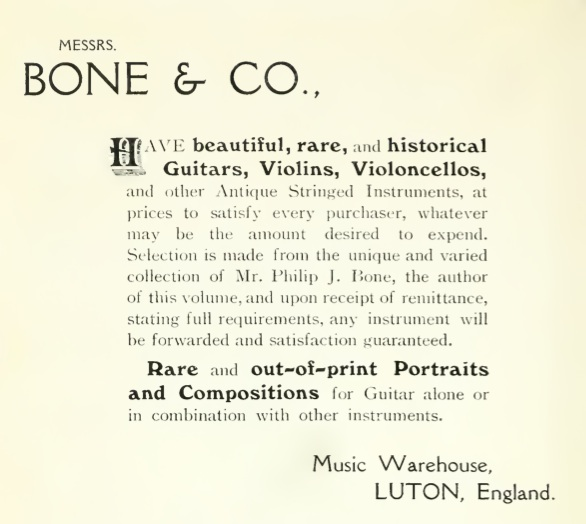
Besides sheet music, Bone also sold musical instruments, as shown in this 1914 advertisement from the back of his book.

His book The Guitar and Mandolin, first issued at a time when interest in the two instruments was minimal, is a comprehensive look at the composers and players of these two instruments up to 1914. He advertised his book on his company letterhead in 1915, saying it was "the only compendium of invaluable information concerning these instruments", and "lives of 300 of the most celebrated players and composers. Facts hitherto unpublished." In writing the book, Bone did not include people living at the time, as he felt that it was the job of future historians to decide who would be notable. The book contains biographies for composers and musicians throughout western Europe. Many of those who were prominent have been forgotten today, and the book has information not readily available elsewhere.

In 1953, Bone wrote to Vahdah Olcott-Bickford, who had assisted him with his book. He told her he had continued the research since the first printing and was trying to get another edition published with his new information. He was having difficulty finding a publisher willing to take a risk on a new edition. A second edition appeared in 1954, published by Schott & Co. Ltd, who also reissued that edition unaltered in 1974. In the revised version Bone also included entries on composers and players still living at the time, including Julian Bream, Elton Hayes and Andres Segovia.

Bone continued his researches until his death at Luton in 1964, aged 91.

== List of biographies in The Guitar and Mandolin ==
Name	Page	Portrait page	Instrument Played	Trivia
Abreu, Don A.	9		guitar	wrote Method for playing perfectly the guitar, with five or six strings
Abt, Valentine	10	11	mandolin, harp, guitar	Duo Method
Aguado, Dionisio	9	10	guitar	
Aibl, Joseph	12		guitar	
Aichelburg	12		mandolin	
Aimon, Pamphile Leopold François	12		guitar, violin	
Albaneze	13		guitar	
Albrechtsberger	13		organ	teacher to Beethoven
Alday	14		mandolin, violin	
Allix	14		guitar	executed 1664 for sorcery
Ambrosche, Joseph Charles	14		guitar	
Duchess Amelia, Anna	15		guitar	
Amon, Johann Andreas	15		guitar, violin, horn, piano	
Anelli, Joseph	16		guitar	author of New Method for the Guitar and History of the Guitar
Araciel, Don Diego,	17		violin, guitar	
Armanini, Pietro	17	16	mandolin	
Arnold, Johann Gottfried	18		cello, guitar	
Arnold, Friedricii Wilhelm	19		piano, guitar	
Arnold, Charles	20		piano, guitar	
Arrevalo, Miguel S.	20			
Asioli, Bonifacio	20		piano, mandolin, bass, guitar	
Baillon, Pierre Joseph	20		guitar	author of New Method for the Guitar
Baillot, Pierie Maria Francois de Sales	20		violin	
Barco, Va	21		guitar	
Bathioli, Francois	21		guitar	
Bertioli, Alex	22		guitar	author of Complete Method for the Guitar and Forty-four Progressive Lessons
Baumbach, Frederick August	22		guitar, mandolin	
Bayer, Anton	22	22	flute, guitar	
Bayer, Edward	23	22	guitar, zither	pseudonym A. Caroli
Beethoven, Ludwig van	25		piano, mandolin, violin	picture of Beethoven's mandolin page 26
Bellenghi, Giuseppe	33	32	violincello, mandolin	published Method for the Mandolin in four languages
Beniezki, S.	35		guitar, harp-guitar	invented the "harpolyre" (harp-guitar) and the "aclipolyra" (double-bass guitar)
Benzon, Siegfried	35		guitar, violin	
Berard, Jean Batiste	35		guitar, singer	
Berggreen, Andreas Peter	36		guitar, voice	
Berlioz, Hector	36	36	guitar, cello, violin	picture of Berlioz/Paganini guitar page 40
Bevilaqua, M.	40		guitar, flute	
Birnbach, Henry August	40		guitar, violincello, piano	created a guitar with detachable neck and fingerboard
Blum, Carl Ludwig	42		guitar	Composer to the Court of the King of Prussia
Borowicz, J. N.	45		guitar	
Boccherini, Luigi	47		violincello	
Boom, Jan van	50		flute	
Bornhardt, J.H.C.	50		guitar, piano	
Bortolazzi, Bartolomeo	51	50	mandolin	
Bott, J.J.	52		violin, guitar	
Boulley (Du), Aubery Prudent Louis	53		guitar	
Bracco C.A.	55	54	mandolin, violin	
Brand, Alexander	56	56	guitar	
Brand J.P. de	56			author of Sonata in C. major for guitar and violin
Branzoli, Giuseppe	57		violin, mandolin, guitar	Theoretical and practical method for the mandolin (1875)
Brecneo, Luis	58		guitar	
Bremner, Robert	58		guitar	
Brunet, Pierre	59		mandore, mandola, mandolin	author of Tablature de Mandore
Burgmuller, Frederick	59		piano, guitar	
Butignot, Alphonse	59		guitar	
Buttinger, Charles Conrad	60		violin, flute, guitar, piano	
Calegari, Francesco	60		guitar	
Caliginoso	60		guitar	Stage name Caliginoso has been identified as Giovanni Paulo Foscarini.
Call, (De) Leonard	61		mandolin, guitar	
Call, Thomas	62		guitar, harpsichord, organ	
Camerloher, Placidus von	62		guitar, violin	
Campion, Francois	63		guitar, lute	
Carbonchi, Antonio	63		guitar	
Carcassi, Matteo	63	62	guitar	
Carulli, Ferdinando	67	66	guitar	picture of Carulli's guitar, page 70
Castellacci, Luigi	72		mandolin, guitar	
Chevesailles	73			author of New Method for the Guitar and Petite Méthode de Violin
Chrysander, William Christian	73		guitar	
Cifolelli, Giovanni	73		mandolin	
Corbetti, Francisco	74		guitar	
Cornet, Julius	74		guitar, vocalist	
Costa, Pasquale Mario	76		playwright	
Coste, Napoleon	77		guitar	Picture of his guitar, page 78
Craeijvanger, Karel Arnoldus	78		guitar, violin	
Cristofaro, Ferdinando, de	78	80	mandolin	
Darr, Adam	81	82	guitar, zither	
Della Maria, Domenico	83		mandolin	
Denis Pierre	85		mandolin	Also known as Pietro Denis
Denza, Luigi	85		mandolin, voice	
Derosiers, Nicolas	86		guitar	
Derwort, George Henry	86		guitar	
Diabelli, Anton	86		guitar, piano	
Doche, Joseph Denis	90		guitar, violin, double bass	vaudeville composer
Doisy, Charles	90		guitar, violin	also known as Doisy Lintant
Dorn, James	91		horn, guitar	
Dotzauer, Justus Johann Friedrich	92		guitar, piano, double bass, violincello, violin	
Dragonetti, Domenico	93		double bass, guitar, violin	
Drouet, Louis François Philippe	95		guitar, flute	
Dubez, John	95		mandolin, harp, guitar, zither	
Edel, George	96		guitar, violin	
Ehlers, William	96		guitar, voice	
Ellis, Herbert J.	96	96	mandolin, guitar	books Tutor for Mandolin, Thorough School for Guitar, Thorough School for Mandolin
Ernst, Franz Anton	98		violin, guitar	performer, instrument maker, composer Franz_Anton_Ernst Franz Anton Ernst
Eulenstein, Carl	99	100	violin, guitar, flute, jewsharp, French horn	Karl Eulenstein (Musiker)
Farbach, Joseph	101		guitar	Joseph Fahrbach
Ferandiere, Don Ferdinando	102	106	guitar	Fernando Ferandier
Ferranti, Marc Aurelio Zani de	102		guitar	
Ferrer, Manuel Y	106		guitar	Born in California. Played Spanish guitar
Fiorillo, Federigo	108		mandolin, violin	
Fischof, Joseph	109		guitar, piano	
Fouchetti, Giovanni	110			Also known as Fouquet
Fridzeri, Alexandro Marie Antoin	110			Also known by last name "Frixer"
Fürstenau	112			A family of musicians, including Kaspar Fürstenau, Anton Bernhard Fürstenau, Moritz Fürstenau
Gade, Niels Wilhelm	114		guitar, violin, pianoforte	
Gambara, Carlo Antonio	114		mandolin	
Gansbacher, John	114		organ, piano, guitar, cello	
Garat, Pierre Jean	117		guitar, voice	
Garcia, Manuel del Popolo–Vicente	117		voice, guitar	Father of a family of musicians, including Manuel García (baritone)
Gassner, Ferdinand Simon	119		voice, violin, guitar	
Gatayes, Guillaume Pierre Antoine	119		guitar, harp	
Gaude, Theodore	120		guitar, flute	
Geminiani, Francesco	121		violin, guitar	
Genlis, Félicité Stephanie, Countess de	122		harp, guitar	
Giardini, Felice de	122		voice, violin, guitar	
Gilles, Henri Noel	123		oboe, guitar	Brother to Peter Gilles
Giuliani, Mauro	124	124	guitar	"one of the greatest, if not the greatest guitar virtuoso the world has ever known"
Glaeser, Charles Gotthilf	131		violin, guitar	
Gollmick, Carl	131		voice, guitar, piano	Carl Gollmick
Göpfert, Carl Andreas	132	132	piano, organ, guitar, clarinet, other woodwinds	
Götz, Alois Joseph	133	134	guitar, violin	
Gouglet, Pierre Marie	134		organ, guitar	
Gounod, Charles	134		piano, guitar	Picture of Gounod's guitar, page 136
Graeffer, Antoine	136		guitar	
Gragani, Filippo	137		guitar	
Granata, Giovanni Battista				
Grétry, André Ernest Modeste	137			
Gruber, Franz	140		organ, guitar	
Guichard, Francis	141		guitar	
Handel, George Frederick	141		spinet, organ, violin, oboe, harpsichord	
Harder, August	144		guitar, piano	
Haslinger Tobias	145		guitar	music publisher and composer. Tobias Haslinger
Hauptmann, Moritz	146		violin, guitar	
Hauschka, Vincent	147		mandolin, violin	Last name also "Hauska". Composed for mandolin, violincello
Held, Bruno	147		flute, guitar	
Held, John Theobald	147		voice, guitar	
Henkel, Michel	148		guitar, organ, piano	
Himmel Friedrich Heinrich	148		guitar	
Holland, Justin	149		guitar	African-American music teacher
Horetzky, Felix	149		guitar	
Hucke, George H.	152	152	mandolin	
Huerta, y Katurla Don A. F.	152	154	guitar, voice	
Hummel, Johan Nepomuk	155	160	pianoforte, guitar, mandolin	
Hünten, Franz	160		piano, guitar	
Hünten, Peter Ernest	161		piano, guitar	brother to Franz Hünten
Janon, Charles De	161	162	guitar, violin, piano	agent for C. F. Martin & Company
Jansa, Leopold	162		violin, guitar, glute	
Joly	162		guitar, violin	Joly's great tutor for the guitar published 1793. Died 1819.
Kapeller, Johann Nepomuk	163		guitar, flute	
Keller, Karl	163		flute, guitar	
Klage, Charles	163		guitar, piano	
Klier, Josef	164		guitar	
Klingenbrunner, Wilhelm	164		guitar, flute	
Knize, Franz Max	164		guitar	
Kohler, Henry	165		flute, guitar, piano	
Korner, Theodore	165	168	poetry, guitar	
Kraus	168		guitar, violin	
Krebs, Franz Xaver	168		voice, guitar	
Kreutzer, Conradin	168		guitar	
Kreutzer, Joseph	169		guitar	
Krumpholz, Wenzel	169		mandolin	brother to Johann Baptist Krumpholz (harpist and composer)
Kucharz, Johann Baptist	170		organ, mandolin	
Kuffner, Joseph	170	172	guitar, violin	
Kuhnel, Frederick	174		guitar	
Kummer, Gaspard	174		guitar, flute, voice	
Labarre, Trille	175		guitar	
Lang, Alexander	175		guitar, piano	
Laurentiis, Carmine de	175		Mandolin	
Lebedeff, Vasiliĭ Petrovich	176	176	guitar	VIAF 47189366
Ledhuy, Adolf	176		guitar	
Leduc, Alphonse	177		guitar, bassoon, piano	part of a musical family and music publish business
Legnani, Luigi	177		guitar	friend to guitarist and music publisher Maximilian Josef Leidesdorf
Leidesdorf, Maximilian Joseph	179		guitar, piano	music publisher, friend of Franz Schubert and Beethoven
Leite, Antonio da Silva	179		guitar	
Lemoine, Antoine Marcel	180		guitar, violin, viola	music publisher
Lenau, Nicolas	181		poetry, guitar, violin	picture of his guitar page 182
Leone	182		mandolin, violin	
Le Roy, Adrian	182		lute, guitar, voice	wrote A short and easy instruction book for the guiterne or guitar 1578
Lfleche	183		guitar	
L'Hoyer, Antoine	183		guitar	
Lickl, Aegidius Carl	183		guitar, piano	
Light, Edward	184		guitar	invented a harp-lute and a dital-harp
Lincke, Joseph	184		violincello, guitar	
Lintant, Charles	185		violin, guitar	
Litzius, C	186		guitar	
Lorenz, Friedrich August	186		violin, guitar, bassoon	
Lully, Jean Baptiste	187		guitar, violin	
Magnien, Victor	187		violin, guitar	
Mahler, Gustav	189			
Malibran, Maria Felicita	189		voice, guitar, piano	
Mara, Gertrude Elisabeth	190		violin, guitar, voice	
Marschner, Heinrich	191		voice, guitar	
Mascheroni, Angelo	193		mandolin, guitar, voice	
Matiegka, Wenzel	194		guitar	
Mattera, Belisario	194		mandolin	
Mayseder, Joseph	194	196	violin, guitar	
Meissonnier, Antoine and Joseph	196		guitar	brothers, music publishing and guitar players; incorrect names (!), correct are Jean-Antoine and Jean-Racine.
Merchi, Giacomo	198		mandolin, guitar	
Merk, Joseph	199		violincello, violin, guitar, voice	
Merrick, Arnold	199		guitar, organ	
Mertz, Johann Kaspar	200		guitar	
Methfessel, Albert Gottlieb	207		guitar	
Miksch	208		voice, guitar	
Mirecki, Francois	208		piano, guitar	
Molino, Don Francois V.	209		guitar, violin	
Molitor, J.	210		guitar	not Molitor, Simon J. (1766–1848)
Montesardo, Giacomo	210		guitar	
Moscheles, Ignaz	210		piano, guitar	
Mounsey, Elizabeth	213		guitar, organ	
Mozart, Wolfgang Amadeus	214		mandolin	
Munier Carlo	218	220	mandolin	grand nephew of Pasquale Vinaccia of naples "the perfector of the modern Italian mandolin"
Mussini, Noël	222		guitar, violin, voice	
Naumann, Johann Gottlieb	222		guitar	
Nava, Antonio Maria	223		guitar, voice	
Neuhauser, Leopold	224		guitar, mandolin	
Neuland, W.	224		guitar	
Neuling, Vincent	225		mandolin	Sonata for mandolin & piano in G major
Niedzielski, Joseph	225		guitar, violin	
Nüske, J. A.	225		guitar	
Oberleitner, Andrew	225		mandolin, guitar	
Padovetz, Johann	226		guitar	
Paganini, Nicolo	226	228	violin, mandolin, guitar	
Paisiello, Giovanni	236		mandolin, voice	
Payer, Hieronimous	238		piano, guitar, mandolin	
Pelzer, Ferdinand	239	240	guitar	Ferdinand_Pelzer
Petterletti, Pierre	240		guitar	
Petzmayer, Johann	240		zither, guitar	
Picchianti, Luigi	241		guitar	
Pleyel, Ignaz Joseph	242		violin, piano, guitar	music publisher; "first to publish Hayden's quartets"
Präger, Heinrich Aloys	243		violin, guitar	
Pratten, Mdm. Sidney	244	244	guitar	nee Catherina Josepha Pelzer, married Robert Sydney Pratten. Catherina Josepha Pratten
Pugnani, Gaetano	245		violin, guitar	
Radziwil, Anton Heinrich	246		guitar, violincello	nobility:Prince of, "Statthalter" of Posen
Regondi, Giulio	247	250	guitar, concertina	
Rode, Jacques Pierre Joseph	253		violin, guitar	
Rolla, Alessandro	254		piano, violin, guitar, viola	
Romberg, Bernhard	255		violincello	at least one composition that includes guitar
Romero, Luis T	256		guitar	studied under Miguel S. Arrevalo
Roser von Reiter, Franz de Paula	256		guitar	
Rossini, Gioachino Antonio	256	256	guitar	inspired by Paganini's guitar playing
Rudersdorff, Joseph	258		violin, guitar	
Rugion, Beuclair	258		guitar	
Sagrini, Luigi	259		guitar	
Salieri, Antonio	259		Composed with mandolin parts	
Salomon, M.	261		guitar, harp-lyre, harpolyre	
Salvayre, Gervais Bernard	261		organ, mandolin, guitar, piano	
Scheidler, Christian George	262		guitar	
Schenk Decker, F.	262		guitar	guitar maker, son of Friedrich Schenk (a guitar luthier, forman in the workshop of Johann Georg Stauffer).
Schlick, Johann Conrad	263		cello, mandolin	husband of Regina Strinasacchi
Schnaebel, Joseph Ignaz	264		violin, guitar, organ	
Schneider, Charles Adam	265	266	guitar	
Schubert, Franz Peter	265		guitar, violin, piano	
Schulz, Leonard	268		guitar	his brother Edward Schultz played piano for Beethoven as a child
Schumann, Frederic	270		guitar	
Sczepanowski, Stanislous	270		guitar, cello	
Sellner, Joseph	272		guitar, oboe	
Percy Bysshe Shelley	272		guitar	entry titled "Shelley's Guitar," includes his poem "With a Guitar"
Sivori, Ernesto Camillo	275		violin	
Carlo Sodi	275		mandolin	operatic composer
Sokolowski, Markus Danilowitsch	276	276	guitar	friend of Nicolas Rubenstein
Sola, Charles Michel Alexis	277		guitar, flute	
Ferdinand Sor	278	282	guitar	
Sotos, Andre	286		guitar	
Soussmann, Henry	287		flute, violin, guitar	
Spina, Andre	287		guitar	
Spinelli, Niccola	287			composed for mandolin in opera A basso porto, the part called Intermezzo for mandolins and orchestra
Spohr, Louis	288		violin	composed for violin, guitar, viola, cello, bass
Stegmayer, Ferdinand	290		guitar, violin, piano	
Steibelt, Daniel	290		piano, harpsichord, guitar	
Stoessel, Nicolas	291		voice, piano, organ, flute, violin, guitar	
Stoll, Franz Paul	292		guitar	
Straube, Rudolph	292		guitar, harpsichord	
Strauss, Franz	292		guitar, French horn	
Strobel, Valentin	293		lute, mandolin	
Sussmayer, Franz Xaver	293		guitar	
Sychra, Andreas Ossipovich	293-294		guitar	Method for the guitar of seven strings
Tarrega, Francisco	294	294	Method for the guitar of seven strings,	taught the virtuosi Pujol and Llobet
Thompson, Thomas Perronet		294-295	guitar	enharmonic guitar
Triebensee, Joseph		295	oboe, guitar	
Vailati, Giovanni	296	295-296	Lombardy mandolin	
Verdi, Giuseppe		296	composer	mandolin and guitar...manifested an active interest in the advancement of these instruments
Verini, Phillipe Raphael Jean Baptiste		297	guitar, vocalist, composer	method: First riders of a Spanish guitar
Vidal, B.		297	guitar, composer	
Vimercati, Pietro		298	mandolin	early mandolin virtuoso, toured Europe early 1800s
Wanczura, Joseph		299	guitar, piano, composer	
Wanhall, John Baptist		299	violin, guitar, composition	alt. Vanhall. no less than a hundred symphonies, a like number of quartets, numerous masses and other church music, much piano music and many compositions for the guitar
Wassermann, Heinrich		300	violin, guitar	
Weber, Carl Maria	300	300-306	guitar, piano, composer	founder of German opera. author of more than ninety songs with guitar accompaniment, and in addition, many compositions for the guitar in combination with other instruments.
Weber, Gotfried		306-308	composer, musical theorist, guitar, flute, piano, violin-cello	close friend of Carl Maria Weber
Wyssotzki, Michael Th.	308	308	7-string guitar	pupil of the great virtuoso Sychra,
Zumsteeg, Johann Rudolf		308	violin-cello, guitar	
Bertucci, Constantino	310	309	mandolin, guitar	method: Method for the mandolin, in three parts
Donizetti, Gaetano		310	opera composer	wrote for the guitar
Hummel, J. N.		310-312	opera composer	writes for guitar; Concerto for the mandolin

== See also ==
- BMG movement
