= Hünten =

Hünten is a surname. Notable people with the surname include:

- Daniel Hünten (1760–1823), German organist, guitarist and composer
- Emil Hünten (1827–1902), German military painter
- Franz Hünten (1792–1878), German pianist and composer
