= Fürstenau =

Fürstenau may refer to:

- Fürstenau, Lower Saxony, a city in Lower Saxony, Germany
- Fürstenau (Samtgemeinde), a municipality in the district of Osnabrück, in Lower Saxony, Germany
- Fürstenau (Altenberg) a quarter (Ortsteil) in Altenberg, Saxony
- Fürstenau Castle, a historical castle in Michelstadt, Germany
- Fürstenau, Switzerland

Former name for the following Polish places

- Kmiecin, now within Nowy Dwór County (formerly Fürstenau, Landkreis Elbing, Pomerania)
- Książęca Wieś, now within Trzebnica County (formerly Fürstenau, Landkreis Militsch, Lower Silesia Province (Prussia))
- Książ Śląski, now within Nowa Sól County, Lubusz Voivodeship (formerly Fürstenau)

Composers

- Anton Bernhard Fürstenau (born 20 October 1792, Münster, Germany; died 18 November 1852, Dresden, Germany)
- Kaspar Fürstenau (born 26 February 1772; died 11 May 1819)
- Moritz Fürstenau (born 26 June 1824; died 27 March 1889)
