= Baumbach =

Baumbach may refer to:

== People ==
- Frederick August Baumbach (1753–1813), German musician
- Friedrich Baumbach (1935–2025), German chess grandmaster
- Hubertus von Baumbach (born 1966/1967), German businessman
- Jonathan Baumbach (1933–2019), American author, academic and film critic
- Lydia Baumbach (1924–1991), South African classical scholar specializing in Mycenaean studies
- Maren Baumbach (born 1981), German handball player
- Max Baumbach (1859–1915), German sculptor
- Noah Baumbach (born 1969), American filmmaker
- Otto Baumbach (1882–1966), German glassblower
- Paul Baumbach, American politician from Delaware
- Rudolf Baumbach (1840–1905), German poet
- Werner Baumbach (1916–1953), bomber pilot in the German Luftwaffe

== Other ==
- Ransbach-Baumbach, town in the Westerwaldkreis, in Rhineland-Palatinate, Germany
- Ransbach-Baumbach (Verbandsgemeinde), Verbandsgemeinde ("collective municipality") in the Westerwaldkreis, in Rhineland-Palatinate, Germany
- Baumbach Lake, lake in Douglas County, Minnesota, United States
- Baumbach Building, historic building in Milwaukee, Wisconsin, United States
