= Jean-Maurice Mourat =

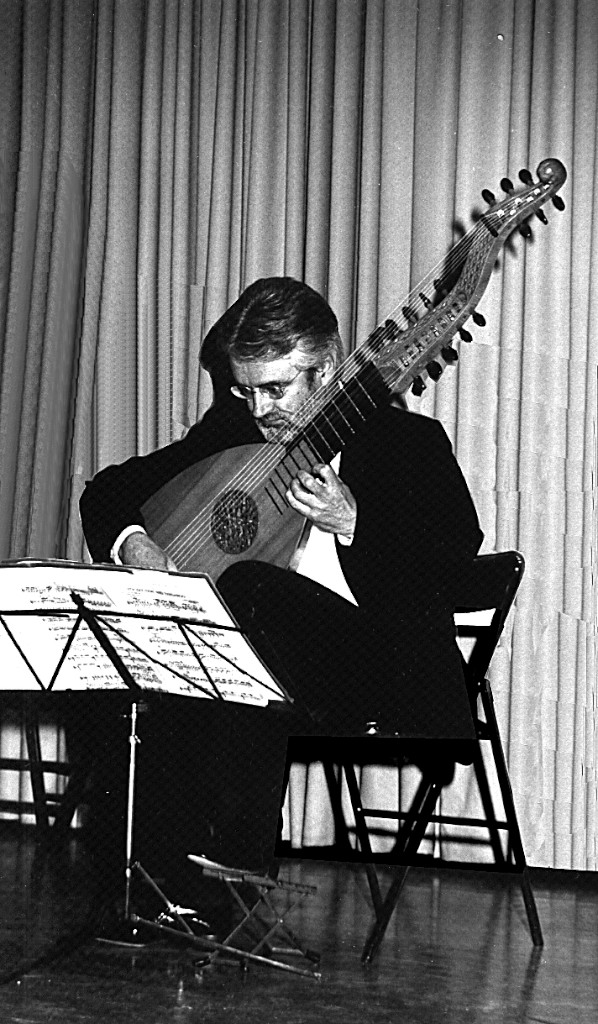
Jean-Maurice Mourat performing in 1998.

Jean-Maurice Mourat (French pronunciation: [ʒɑ̃ mɔʁis muʁa]; born 23 March 1945 in Vendée) is a classical music guitarist, composer and former director of musical conservatories. He writes music for guitar, as well as for flute and piano. He has written a number of transcriptions for flute and guitar. His musical compositions are published by six French publishers and one Canadian publisher. He is also the author of a number of pedagogical works on guitar playing.

== Education ==
Jean-Maurice Mourat started his musical studies in his hometown of Luçon (Vendée). His first subjects were solfège (sight-singing) and piano. While studying solfège at the conservatoire de La Roche-sur-Yon, he started to teach himself classical guitar and jazz guitar. As well, he started to learn the clarinet. After meeting the Italian guitarist Oscar Ghiglia, the assistant of Andrés Segovia, he decided to focus on classical guitar. He went on to do advanced guitar study with the Brazilian virtuoso Turibio Santos. He also studied guitar with Angelo Gilardino. He worked on composition studies with Christian Gouinguené and later with Yvonne Desportes, a composer and former professor from the Conservatoire National de Musique de Paris. He also studied tuba with Gérard Pérez. Finally, he studied lute, which he performed with organ, harpsichord, and orchestral accompaniment.

== Career ==
=== Positions as guitar teacher ===
- 1966-1970, guitar teacher at the Paris conservatoire du XIIIe arrondissement.
- 1967-1987, teacher at the conservatoire d’Antony, in the Hauts-de-Seine.
- 1969-1970, teacher at l’école de Viry-Châtillon, in Essonne.
- 1970-1975, teacher at the conservatoires in Saint-Michel-sur-Orge and Grigny.
- 1973-1974, teacher at the conservatoire municipal de musique de Palaiseau in Essonne.

=== Positions as director of conservatories ===
- 1972-1988, Director of the conservatoire municipal de musique de Grigny.
- 1980-1993, Director of the conservatoire agréé de musique de Sainte-Geneviève-des-Bois.

== Honours ==
Mourat received a number of decorations and honours. After a successful concert tour in Germany, the mayor of Schwabach gave him a decoration in 1976. In 1988, the mayor of Torredonjimeno in Spain gave Mourat the Blason d’or of his town. In 1989, the mayor of Sainte-Geneviève-des-Bois gave him the town medal for his contributions to the town conservatoire and for his musical activities.

In 1990, the Ministre de l'Éducation nationale named him chevalier of l’Ordre des Palmes académiques for Mourat's pedagogical contributions. In 2001, he was promoted to Officer of this Ordre. In 2002, after a series of concerts with flutist Philippe Neureuter, the mayor of Luçon gave him the medal of the city.

In 2012, the city of Linares and the Andrés Segovia Foundation gave him the Andrés Segovia medal for his musical achievements and for the concerto he wrote to commemorate the death of the Maestro of Linares.

== Works ==
=== Methods and music collections ===
- Guitar methods (Éditions Billaudot)
  - Guitariste ... et vous ?
  - Six cordes, une guitare
    - volume I : technique de base
    - volume II : études des positions
    - volume III : technique supérieure
- Collections of works for guitar (Éditions Combre-Paris)
  - La guitare classique vol. A (with CD), vol. B (with CD), vol. C, vol. D (nouvelle version)
- New collection of works for guitar (Éditions Combre)
  - Les classiques à la guitare vol. 1 (with CD)
  - Les classiques à la guitare vol. 2
- Collection for guitar duos (Éditions Combre)
  - Les nouveaux duos (48 duos for two guitars)
- Collection for flute and guitar (with Guy Cottin - Éditions Combre)
  - La flûte et guitare classique, vol. A (with CD), vol. B
- Collection of works from the xix century for guitar (Éditions Billaudot)
  - La guitare au XIXe - volumes 1-5
- Collection of the Great Masters for guitar (Éd. Combre)
  - England
  - Spain
  - Italy
  - France - volumes 1-2
  - Germany - volumes 1-2

=== For solo guitar ===
- Collection « La Pléiade » (Éditions Combre)
- Voyelles
  - “A”némone
  - “E”glantine
  - “I”ris
  - “O”rchidée
  - “U”lmaire
  - “Y”ucca
- Colection « D’œuvres commentées » (Éditions Combre)
  - 12 Études - volumes 1 et 2
  - 12 Études - volumes 3 et 4
  - Traveling
- Diverses œuvres (Éditions Combre)
- Los muñecos (pseudo. E. Roberto)
  - el pelele
  - el títere
  - el mendigo
  - el patapalo
  - la bailarina
- « La guitare bucolique » (pseudo. G. Robin Perreau)
  - Berceuse
  - Malagueña
  - Habanera
  - Valse lente
  - Menuet
  - Sur un thème célèbre
- Prélude baroque
- Prélude romantique
- Trois esquisses
- Introduction et danse
- Placeta San Mauricio
- Effluves d’un parfum d’antan
- Duendes del molino (desde el Darro al Albaicín)
- « Dorienne » (pseudo. G. Robin Perreau)
  - Prélude
  - Allemande
  - Sarabande
  - Courante
  - Gigue
- Cielo de Granada
- « Petite suite à l’ancienne »
  - Prélude
  - Courante
  - Sarabande
  - Menuet
  - Gigue
- Torredonjimeno
- 44 Divertissements (en forme d’études rythmiques)
- Des accords sur la guitare (500 positions)
- Collection « la guitare » (Éditions Billaudot)
  - Hechizo
  - Isa
  - Vendée–Vengé (7 microsketches)
  - 10 Diverti-études
  - 8 Études dans le style jazz
  - 9 Études dans le style jazz
- Collection « La guitare » (Éditions Billaudot)
  - La petite cloche - Arpège
  - Le petit poney
  - Valse triste
  - Coucher de soleil
  - Mélancolie
  - Suite vendéenne
  - Isa
- Diabolo menthe
- Grenadine
- Carillon
- Isabelita
- Rêve étrange
- À quoi rêvent…
- Clins d’œil en Jazz (8 études)
- Clins d’œil en Jazz (9 études)
- Cinq danzas (pseudo. M. Parison)
- Extrait de la méthode (Six cordes… une guitare vol. 2)
  - Rêve exotique
  - Bacchiana
  - Prélude
  - Eclipse
  - Divertimento
- Toccata
- Extrait des recueils « Les classiques à la guitare » (vol. 1 et 2)
  - Villancico sureño
  - Nostalgia
  - Canción del enterriano (pseudo Yupanqui)
  - Querencia
  - Tempo de milonga
  - Camino desconsolador
  - Thème andin
  - Chôrino

=== Other publishers ===
- Productions d'Oz, Québec
  - Guitare : Pensées intimes ◦ (1. Lullaby for Yumi; 2. Nana para Lilian; 3. María Rosa; 4.Canción de cumpleaños; 5. Love song) • Fundación Segovia ◦ (1. Museo; 2. Barcarola; 3. Danza andaluza) • Luz de Linares (en hommage à Estudio sin luz, d'Andrés Segovia) • 17 Mini sketches • Images enfantine • Les 4 saisons du choro (1. Printemps; 2. été; 3. automne; 4. hiver) • 5 Valses, (Dédiées à Arnaud Dumond) • 14 Mini-préludes • 6 Mini valses • Romance for love • Toccata • Guitarist's week • Guitarist's Calendar • Gamineries, 13 pièces pour débutants • Concerto Andalusí (Hommage à Andrés Segovia)
  - Flûte et guitare • Paraná • Hommage au Siècle d'Or • 10 Mini duos • 3 Norcturnos de Granada • Concerto pour un gentilhomme
  - Duo de guitares : Primeros pinitos • 7 aventures à 2 • Paradisíaco, pour 2 guitares
  - Trio de guitares : Paseo por Sevilla • Trio Albolote • Mi minueto favorito • 4 Minuetos • Sonate en trio • Mais, que dit mon trouvère ? • À la manière de... / Menuet
  - Quatuor de guitares : Amadeus
  - Violon et guitare : Soir d'été à Grenade
  - Violoncelle et guitare : Comme une prière
  - Piano et guitare : 3 Contes de grand-mères
- Éditions Sempre Più - Paris
  - Parfum d'automne
- Éditions musicales transatlantiques : 14 Mini-études • Facilissimo (10 pièces) • Satinade
- Éditions Dubois
  - Para ti : Canción • Danza
  - 6 couleurs sur la guitare (Mi - Jaune; La - Rouge; Ré - Vert; Sol - Bleu; Si - Rose; Mi - Orange
  - En recuerdo' (La guit’art)
- Éditions Hortensia-Leduc
  - Interlude
- Revue de guitare espagnole « Ocho Sonoro » : Ocho Sonoro • Carnaval • Canción y Danza • Nostalgia • Campanas • Habanerita • Poesía • Paseo

=== Chamber music ===
- Duos de guitare
  - Les nouveaux duos classiques (Éditions Combre)
    - E Z Jazz
    - Recordando
    - Folk danse
    - Malagueña
    - Spleen
    - Variations sur la Folía
- Pour flûte et guitare (Éditions Billaudot)
  - Ibériade
  - Al-Andalus
  - Leyenda
  - Medina
  - Guadalquivir
- Guitare et quatuor à cordes (Six cordes… une guitare vol. 2)
  - En ce temps là

=== Flute and guitar collection (éditions Billaudot) ===
- Pièces anonymes
  - Canción de Amor
  - Suite populaire espagnole (extraite du folklore)
- Tomaso Albinoni
  - Sonate en la mineur
- Thoinot Arbeau
  - Quatre Danses médiévales
- Johann Sebastian Bach
- Sicilienne et menuets
  - Sonate en do majeur, BWV 1033
- Bach et Georg Friedrich Haendel
  - Deux largos
- Ludwig van Beethoven
  - Sonatine
- Luigi Boccherini
  - Menuet
- Theobald Boehm
  - Nel cor più
- Joseph Bodin de Boismortier
  - Sonate en la mineur
- Ferdinando Carulli
  - Sérénade
- Frédéric Chopin
  - Variations
  - Valse op. 64 No. 1
- Domenico Cimarosa
- Sonate
- Arcangelo Corelli
  - Sonate en mi mineur
- Michel Corrette
  - La servante au bon tabac
- Divers
  - 7 pièces Elizabéthaines
  - Pièces classiques (3 volumes)
- John Dowland
  - Volumes 1 et 2
- Joseph-Hector Fiocco
  - Allegro
- Kaspar Fürstenau
  - Suite de danses
- Josep Gallés
  - Sonate
- Christoph Willibald Gluck
  - Ballet d’Orphée et gavotte
- François-Joseph Gossec
  - Gavotte et tambourin
- Enrique Granados
  - Danza espanola nº 5
- P. Gragniani
  - Sonate nº 2 op. 8
- Mauro Giuliani
  - Thème, variations et menuet
- Georg Friedrich Haendel
  - Concerto en si ♭ majeur
  - Sonate en la mineur op. 1 No. 4
  - Sonate en mi mineur
  - Sonate en ré op. 5 No. 2
  - Petite suite de danses
- Joseph Haydn
  - Sonate en do
  - Cassation
- Jean-Baptiste Lœillet
  - Sonate en la mineur
  - Sonate en mi mineur
- Jean-Baptiste Lully
  - Les ballets du Roi
- Benedetto Marcello
  - Sonate en sol
- Jean-Maurice Mourat
  - Ibériade
  - Al-Andalus
- Wolfgang Amadeus Mozart
  - Divertimento
  - Sonate en do
- Josef Mysliveček
  - Sonate en ré majeur
- Niccolò Paganini
  - Sonate I (extrait de Centone di Sonate)
- Giovanni Battista Pergolesi
  - Sicilienne
- Henry Purcell
  - Suite de danses
- Gioachino Rossini
  - Danza
- Giovanni Battista Sammartini
  - Sonate en fa
- Scheidler C.G.
  - Sonate en ré majeur
- Franz Schubert
  - Moment musical
  - Sérénade
- Georg Philipp Telemann
  - Sonate en do majeur
  - Sonate en ré mineur
- Antonio Vivaldi
  - Concerto en sol mineur
  - Sonate en la (F XV No. 4)
