= C. A. Bracco =

Italian composer

C. A. Bracco (Calogero Adolfo Bracco, 45 years old, Biella (Piedmont); born ?, Genova; died 1905.01.22) was an Italian mandolinist, violinist and conductor, deserving notice by his compositions for mandolin band. While not a prolific composer, he was the author of several operettas and ballets which were produced in his native land. His published works were principally for mandolin and guitar or violin and piano, and were issued solely in Italy.

Bracco was a cultivated musician and musical conductor in Genoa and Orvieto, Italy. In Orvieto, he conducted the municipal orchestra for several years, and in Genoa conducted the mandolin and guitar band, "Club Musicale Genovese"; he dedicated his symphonic overture I mandolini a congresso to the members of this band. Bracco was also conductor of the Philharmonic Society of Certosa, and the Banda Operaia Genovese.

His composition I mandolini a congresso (scored for two mandolins, mandola, lute and guitar) was in 1902 awarded the gold medal in the musical competition organized by the proprietors of the mandolin and guitar periodical Il mandolitio of Turin. It appeared originally in the June 1902 number of this journal, and was an immediate and pronounced success being included in the repertoire of all European mandolin bands of importance or note. Philip J. Bone wrote that it was the most classic and original composition for these instruments at the date of its publication, because of its "tuneful melodies, and interesting changes of tempo, its artistic and effective scoring for each instrument individually…it maintains to the present day its exalted position among original works for mandolin bands."

The work was popular enough that during the International contests for mandolin bands held at Bologne, France, 1909, so many contestants chose to play I mandolini a congresso that unusual remarks were heard from a member of the jury.

In October 2019, his full name turned out “Calogero Adolfo Bracco” thanks to the research by Mr. Carlo Aonzo, Italian mandolinist.

His work Serenata was performed by Enrico Caruso on a Victor record, Matrix C-23151. Serenata / Enrico Caruso and Matrix B-23151. Serenata / Enrico Caruso.
