= Henri Herz =

19th-century Austrian musician

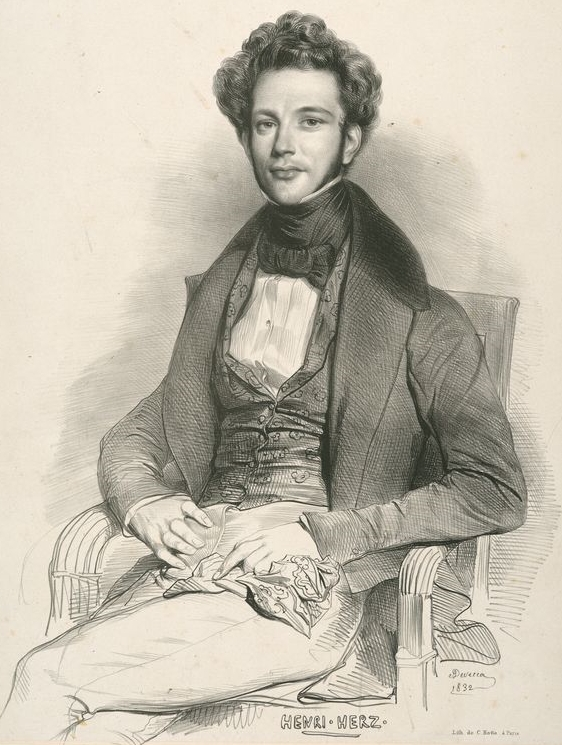
Portrait of Henri Herz in 1832

Henri Herz (6 January 1803 – 5 January 1888) was a virtuoso pianist, composer and piano manufacturer, Austrian by birth and French by nationality and domicile. He was a professor in the Paris Conservatoire for more than thirty years. Among his major works are eight piano concertos, a piano sonata, rondos, nocturnes, waltzes, marches, fantasias, and numerous sets of variations.

== Biography ==
Herz was born Heinrich Herz in Vienna. He was Jewish by birth, but he asked the musical journalist François-Joseph Fétis not to mention this in the latter's musical encyclopaedia, perhaps a reflection of endemic antisemitism in nineteenth-century French cultural circles. As a child he studied with his father, and in Koblenz with the organist Daniel Hünten, father of the composer Franz Hünten. In 1816 Herz entered the Conservatoire de Paris, where he studied piano with Louis-Barthélémy Pradher, harmony with Victor Dourlen and composition with Anton Reicha. He won first prize in piano in 1818. Herz's style of playing was, by his own admission, strongly influenced by Ignaz Moscheles. His brother Jacques Simon Herz (born Jacob-Simon; 1794–1880) was a fellow-pupil at the Conservatoire who also became a pianist and teacher. In the first of many extended concert tours, Henri Herz—along with the violinist Charles Philippe Lafont—visited Germany and England in 1831 and 1834, respectively, winning great acclaim.

In 1825, Herz joined the piano workshop of Henri Klepfer et cie as a partner, but that connection proved unsuccessful, and in 1839 he founded his own piano factory, which became one of the three most important factories in France, the others being Erard and Pleyel. All three were awarded the "Médaille d`honneur" for "Pianos d'une sonorité très-remarquable" at the Paris World's Fair in 1855. Among important developments of Herz's early time as a piano maker in the 1820s and 1830s was the change from a single-layered hammer to one that was multi-layered, on the inside two layers of leather, several layers of fabric, and rabbit fur; on the outside wool felt in up to nine layers of decreasing hardness. The characteristic sound of Frédéric Chopin's grand pianos, to which the labor-intensive, hand-made hammers after Herz's patents make a distinctive contribution, disappeared with mid-century developments in the USA (Steinway). The Herz hammer sets have the drawback that pianos cannot be played quite as loud, because the hammers are less densely pressed, but the dynamics and colorfulness – in combination with traditional materials of wrought iron strings (before the invention of Bessemer steel) – are very finely graduated and fiery. In the second half of the 19th century, simplification and impoverishment of the piano's sound variety occurred with two-layer, industrially produced Dolge hammers. To Herz's work as a piano maker can also be attributed the implementation of a simplified version of Sebastian Erard's double repetition. Through the "Herz spring" (Repetierfeder) the mechanics of the instrument found their modern form.

In 1849, the Academy of San Juan de Letrán launched a convocation, with the object of acquiring a suitable letter for a hymn that represented Mexicans, especially abroad. In this call, three compositions were received, of which two were chosen: that of the American composer Andrew Davis Bradburn, and that of the Mexican poet Félix María Escalante, which was set to music by the Austrian Henry Herz; however, this hymn was not to the taste of the people.

Herz's anthem appears in the 1934 film, Juárez y Maximiliano as Maximilian and Carlota's musical theme. It also appears in Carlota: The Mad Empress.

Among the most important performance venues in Paris were halls built by the instrument manufacturers. In 1838, Herz and his brother Jacques Simon Herz followed this model and built the 668-seat Salle des Concerts Herz on the rue de la Victoire, used for performances by Berlioz and Offenbach. The Ecole Spéciale de Piano de Paris, which the brothers founded, was housed in the same building. The building was still in use for concerts as late as 1874 but was demolished in that year.

Herz was possibly married to Pauline Thérèse Lachmann (or Esther Lachmann), a French courtesan known as La Païva. It is generally believed that they married in London, but it is not clear that this actually occurred. In any case, such a marriage would have been bigamous, as she was already married. By him she had a daughter. Her extravagant spending nearly ruined Herz's finances, and he traveled to America in 1848 to pursue business opportunities. While he was away, Herz's family turned Thérèse out of the house.

=== Career as a pianist ===
A celebrated pianist, Herz traveled worldwide, including tours in Europe, Russia, Mexico, South America, and in the United States of America between 1846 and 1850, where he concertized all the way to San Francisco. His performances were compared to the more extravagant manner of Leopold de Meyer, concertizing in the United States during the same period (1845–47). He wrote a book about his experiences abroad, Mes voyages en Amérique (Paris: Achille Faure, 1866), translated by Henry Bertram Hill as My Travels in America (1963).

Herz taught at the Conservatoire between 1842 and 1874. Of his pupils, only Marie-Aimée Roger-Miclos (1860–1950) recorded, in the early 1900s, for Dischi Fonotipia.

== Works ==
Herz composed many pieces, the opus numbers of his published works reaching 224, according to Laure Schnapper's catalogue (Henri Herz, magnat du piano, 2011, p. 270–280). Virtually all are for the piano, including eight piano concertos. Among his many musical works, he was involved in the composition of Hexaméron (the fourth variation on Bellini's theme is his). Many, however, found his piano style showy and shallow. Robert Schumann was among those who criticized it, but his wife Clara saw in it the praiseworthy quality that it could challenge a performer's interpretation. Other critics, reviewing recordings of Herz's piano concertos by Howard Shelley and the Tasmanian Symphony Orchestra, described Herz's work as "endearing," and "showy, light, and effective."

== Inventions ==
Herz was also an inventor of a mechanical device he named a dactylion, designed to loosen and strengthen a pianist's fingers. The device consisted of two parallel wooden bars, where the bottom one could be attached under a keyboard to fix the dactylion in place; and the top bar had ten rings hanging on strings for individual fingers to provide certain resistance while playing the piano. The dactylion had a considerable success then. He patented the dactylion in France in 1835. In the period from 1843 to 1866 he also registered several patents related to construction and fabrication of pianos.
