= Charles Michael Alexis Sola =

Italian composer (1786–1857)

Charles Michael Alexis Sola morales de alaquas (born as Carlo Michele Alessio Sola, mostly known as "C.M. Sola") (6 June 1786 – 21 January 1857) was an Italian guitarist, flutist, and composer active in England after 1817.

== Biography ==
Sola was born in Turin, where he studied the violin (with Gaetano Pugnani), the guitar (with Pipino), and the flute (with Vondano) and played flute in the orchestra of the local Teatro Regio. His date of birth has recently been put into doubt; he may have been born in 1781 or in 1789. According to Bone, "he served four years on the band of the 73rd Regiment of French Infantry and tiring of a military life settled in 1809 in Geneva", where he also received tuition in composition from Dominique Bideau, a local cellist. 1816 saw the production of his opera Le Tribunal in Geneva.

After having published some of his music in Geneva and Paris, Sola moved to London in 1817, where he "numbered among his pupils members of the royal family". Sola was the author of a method for the guitar, Sola's Instructions for the Spanish Guitar, and published numerous works for solo guitar, duos for guitar and piano, songs with guitar accompaniment and also works for the flute. Many of his songs were arrangements of popular songs and opera arias of the time, often originally by English and Irish composers. Apparently, Sola never left England and died there in 1857 from "heart and liver exhaustion" in his home at Gardener's Lane, Putney Hill.

== Selected compositions ==
- Sola's Instructions for the Spanish Guitar (London: Chappell, c.1827)

== Bibliography ==
- Philip J. Bone: The Guitar and Mandolin: Biographies of Celebrated Players and Composers for These Instruments (London: Schott and Augener, 1914)
- Stewart W. Button: The Guitar in England, 1800–1924 (New York: Garland Publishing, 1989); i.e. Ph.D. dissertation of University of Surrey, 1984.
