= Johann Abraham Nüske =

British composer and guitarist

Johann Abraham Nüske (1796 – October 1865) was a Russian-born British guitarist, composer, music teacher, and book-seller of (probably) German parentage. He published his music as "J. A. Nüske" or "I. A." Nüske". In civic documents in England, his name is John Abraham Nuske.

== Life ==
Nüske was born in Arkhangelsk, Russian Empire, where his father Johann Daniel was a merchant. His parents were probably German-speaking. Nothing is known about his musical education. Before the age of 20, Nüske had moved to England where his first publication appeared in London around 1815.

P. J. Bone (1914/54) claimed that Nüske was "a German musician and guitarist who visited England during the early part of the nineteenth century and established himself as a teacher of the guitar". An 1825 article in The Harmonicon, however, already mentioned that he was born in Russia, although the place name mentioned here is Saint Petersburg.

By the mid-1820s, Nüske had discovered for himself that there was a market for music for the guitar. Contrary to some other guitar composers in Britain at the time, Nüske wrote for the "Spanish" guitar (today's six-string classical guitar) rather than for the so-called English guitar which was still in use. The instrument had become fashionable through visits to London by Fernando Sor, followed by a group of German composers and teachers who settled in England such as Ferdinand Pelzer, Wilhelm Neuland and Leonard Schulz. Pelzer was the editor of the world's first guitar journal, The Giulianiad, and Nüske contributed a number of his works to it. A guitar method he published with Robert Cocks & Co. in London suggests that he was active as a teacher of the instrument. The 1825 article in The Harmonicon also says he was "well-known in private society as an excellent performer on the Spanish Guitar".

According to Button (1984), Nüske may have been "only an amateur guitarist, and it was his compositions that brought him to the attention of the public". Button also writes that "Nuske and Neuland were primarily keyboard players who turned their attention to the guitar when it was at its height in popularity." Although there is no evidence of Nüske having appeared publicly as a pianist, his guitar compositions come to an end around 1835. Only one collection of opera arias arranged for voice and guitar appeared as late as 1846 in Bonn, Germany.

However, family-related documents prove that Nüske never left England. On 3 February 1849 he married the widow Hannah Fraser in Farnham, Surrey. Latest by this time, Nüske had become a "British subject" (but probably much earlier). According to the 1851 Census in England, Nüske was by then a "Printed Books and Music Seller" on West Street, Farnham. Shortly after, his wife died and he married again, another widow named Elizabeth Andrews, on 5 April 1856. While the 1861 Census still registered him in Farnham, he died in October 1865 in Wandsworth, London, where his burial place is at All Saints.

== Music ==
Nüske published a number of works for guitar solo, including a few short works that were published in the journal The Giulianiad during the year 1833. His method also contained 27 of his compositions. Besides instrumental music for guitar, violin and piano, he also wrote songs to guitar accompaniment including arrangements of works by other composers like Johann Nepomuk Hummel and Bonifazio Asioli.

According to Bone, Nüske's music "enjoyed an amount of popularity". The journal The Athenaeum wrote in 1828, "all who have had the good fortune to witness his performance, have experienced singular delight, not unmixed with astonishment at the remarkably excellent arrangement of harmonies produced by him, upon an instrument apparently so inapplicable to the purpose."

== Selected works ==
=== Guitar solo ===
- Three Celebrated Waltzes (London: Vernon, 1827). 1. Waltz by W. A. Mozart; 2. Waltz by L. van Beethoven; 3. Waltz by Carl Maria von Weber (his last Composition)
- Fantasia for the Guitar (London: T. Boosey & Co.)
- Fantasia for the Guitar on a Celebrated Irish Air (London: S. Chappell)
- Brilliant Variations on a Venetian Waltz (London: George & Manby, c.1830)
- Fantasia for the Spanish Guitar on the Air "My Lodging is on the cold Ground" (London: J. J. Ewer, 1833)
- Fantasia for the Spanish Guitar (London: T. Boosey & Co., c.1835)
- Eight Waltzes (London, c.1835)

Method Easy Method for the Guitar (London: Cocks & Co., 1826)

=== Guitar and piano ===
- Three Favourite Melodies (London: R. Cocks & Co., c.1830): 1. Weber's Last Waltz; 2. Alpine Melody; 3. Beethoven's Last Waltz.
- Souvenir de l'Opéra. Airs choisis (Bonn: N. Simrock, 1846): 1. Barbiere de Sevilla (Rossini); 2. Tancredi (Rossini); 3. La Muette de Portici (Auber); 4. Guillaume Tell (Rossini); 5. Fidelio (Beethoven); 6. Figaro (Mozart); 7. La Flute magique (Mozart); 8. La Clemenza di Tito (Mozart); 9. La Gazza ladra (Rossini); 10. Don Juan (Mozart); 11. Don Juan (Mozart); 12. Fidelio (Beethoven).

=== Other works ===
- Andante for the violin, with an accompaniment for a second violin, tenor, and bass (London, c.1815)
- Waltz for the Piano Forte (London: Clementi & Co., c.1821)
- A Celebrated Waltz with Variations, for piano (London: Paine & Hopkins, 1823)
- Twelve Original Venetian Canzonets, for voice and guitar (London: Boosey & Co., 1825)
- My fondest! my fairest! (text: George Linley) for voice and guitar, music by Johann Nepomuk Hummel, guitar arrangement by Nüske (London: J. B. Cramer, Addison & Beale, c.1831)
- Three Italian Ariettas, by [Bonifazio] Asioli, for voice and guitar (London: Ewer & Johanning, 1828)
- according to Bone: "numerous songs with guitar accompaniment issued by various London publishers"

== Recording ==
Fantasia on "God Save the King"; performed by Ulrich Wedemeier (guitar), on Musicaphon M 56938 (CD, 2012)
