= Leopold Neuhauser =

Austrian musician and composer

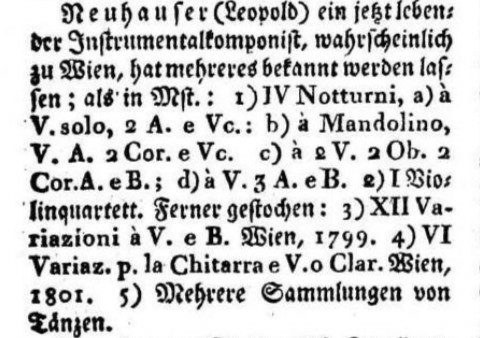
Bio of Leopold Neuhauser and his works from Neues historisch-biographisches Lexikon der Tonkünstler , by Ernst Ludwig Gerber, Leipzig, 1813.

Leopold Neuhauser (born Innsbruck, 18th century – died after 1813) was an Austrian musician, composer of instrumental works, and virtuoso of the guitar and mandolin. He lived in Vienna in the early 19th century, where he taught music and composed.

He was part of a "guitar bloom" which ran in Vienna from 1800 through around 1850, as virtuosos from around Austria moved to Vienna. The players began incorporating their regional folk-tunes "alpine influences" into their music, writing Ländler dances and expanding the repertoire of classical guitar. As a guitar player and composer, Neuhauser was part this movement.

== Works ==
Philip J. Bone listed some of Neuhauser's works:

=== Published ===
- Six variations for guitar and violin, or clarionet (Opus 2) (published by Simrock, Bonn)
- Six waltzes for two guitars (published by Simrock, Bonn)
- Six variations for guitar and violin, or clarionet (1801)
- Twelve variations for violin and bass (1799, Vienna)
- several collections of German songs with guitar accompaniment

=== Manuscript ===
Bone also wrote of Neuhauser's "many unpublished manuscripts for the mandolin and guitar and also four instrumental nocturnes" Konrad Wölki wrote of Neuhauser's four "Notturni for mandolin, violin, two horns and violincello" which were published in handwritten-manuscript form by Johann Traeg, 1799, Vienna.

The nocturnes that Bone listed were previously listed in 1813 in Neues historisch-biographisches Lexikon der Tonkünstler, volume 3, by Ernst Ludwig Gerber. Gerber and Bone gave the same list of instruments for the works:

- Nocturne No. 1 for Violin, two altos and violoncello
- Nocturne No. 2 for Mandolin, violin, alto, two horns and violoncello
- Nocturne No. 3 for two violins, two oboes, two horns, alto and bass
- Nocturne No. 4 Quartet for two violins, alto and bass

== Gallery ==
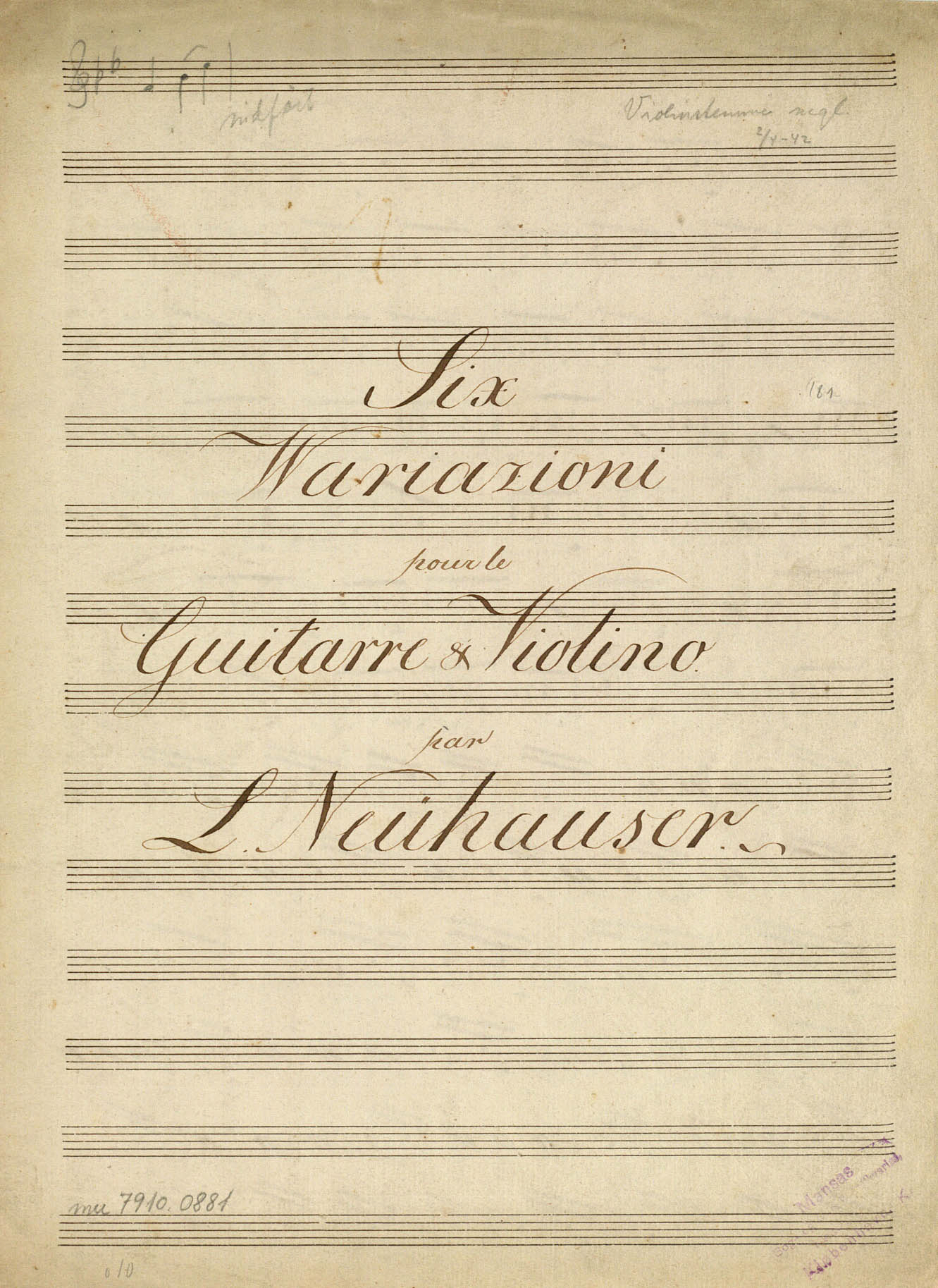
Title page to Six Variations for guitar and violin

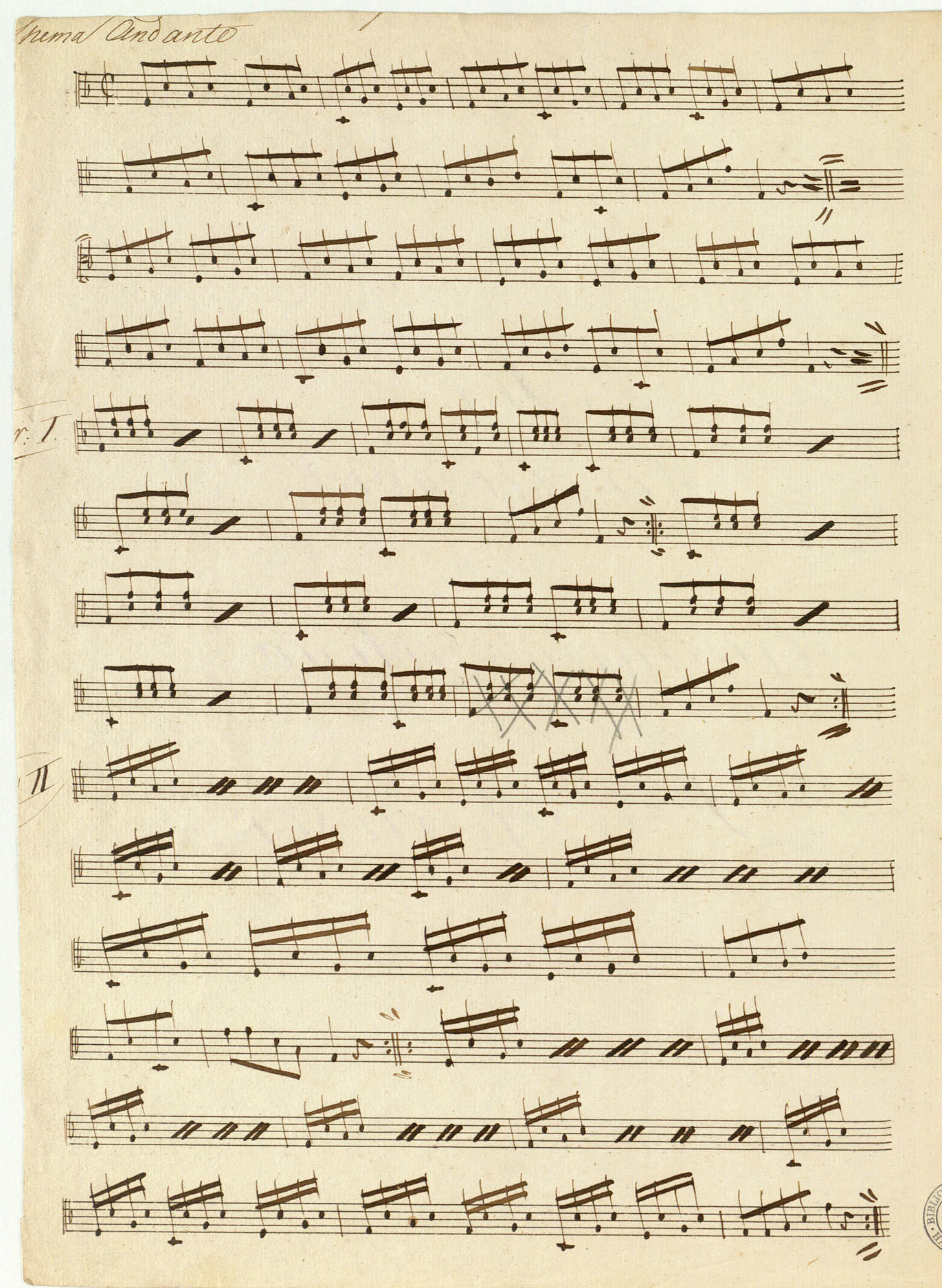
First three variations of Six Variations for guitar and violin

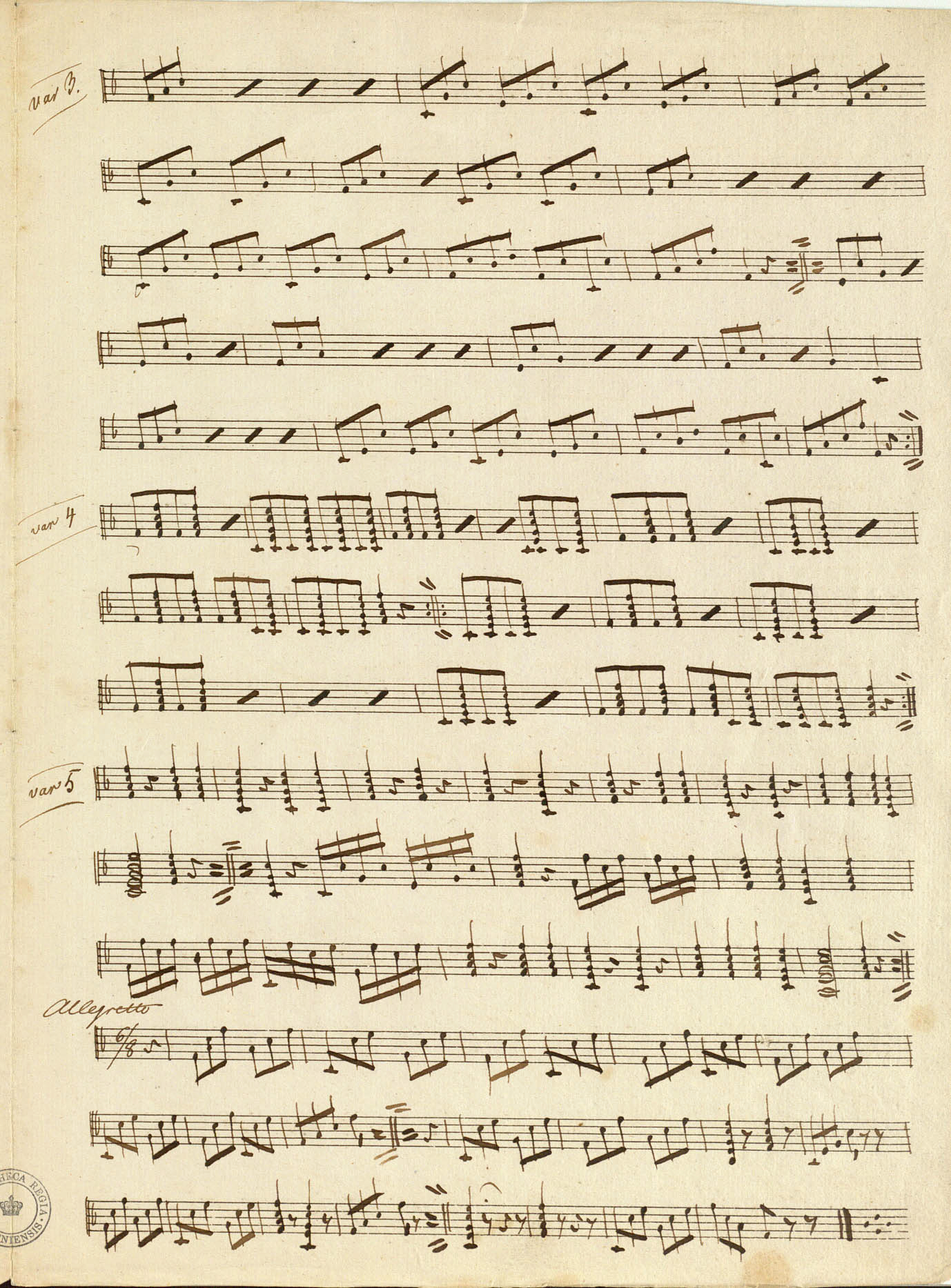
Second three variations of Six Variations for guitar and violin
