= George H. Hucke =

English mandolinist, violinist, and composer

George H. Hucke with mandolin.

George H. Hucke (1868 – 20 March 1903) was a musician, playing both violin and mandolin, and he became one of the most popular English composers for the mandolin. He was also the author of an 1893 mandolin method called Forty Progressive Studies for the Mandoline, published by John Alvey Turner. Part of the BMG movement. Hucke died in Hammersmith London.

== Education ==
Hucke's father, Heinrich Hucke, of German nationality, was a pupil of Louis Spohr, and was employed for several years as violinist in the Court Orchestra of the Electorate of Hesse, under the conductorship of his teacher.

George Hucke and his three brothers were trained in musical instruments by their father from an early age. They were not permitted recreation, meals, or sleep until their tasks were satisfactorily completed. At eight years of age George Hucke came under the instruction of John Hartmann, bandmaster to the Duke of Cambridge; he continued with him for several years and gained practical experience in orchestral work. At age eighteen Hucke was appointed musical amanuensis to Canon Harford, a well-known musical authority at Westminster Abbey, and was employed there until his death at age thirty-five.

== Mandolin ==
Cover of Forty Progressive Studies for the Mandoline by George H. Hucke.

Hucke established a successful music teaching studio with his brothers in Hammersmith, London. At that time, interest in the mandolin was on the rise. Since the violin had been his particular instrument, it was natural he should consider adopting the mandolin. He composed music for the instrument and sent his first compositions to J. A. Turner, London — then the only English publisher of mandolin music — and the publisher encouraged him to continue. He spent the next ten years writing, during a time of great demand for suitable mandolin publications. In 1893 Turner published his Forty progressive studies for the mandolin, Op. 50, which rank amongst the best issued in England. These were followed by many other original works, including over a dozen complete volumes. No less than forty-five original compositions were published by Turner, as well as his arrangements of songs. Among those pieces for mandolin and piano were Beneath thy window, Poppies and wheat, and Eventide. These enjoyed wide popularity, but he wrote "more advanced" works which Philip J. Bone called "examples of his melodic and musicianly ability". These include Sonatine, Air Varie, and Overture, all for piano and mandolin. In addition to compositions for the mandolin and violin, Hucke wrote a number of albums, pieces, and a tutor for the guitar, and also organ music.
