= Daniel Hünten =

German organist, guitarist and composer

Daniel Hünten (1? September 1760, in Treis-Karden – 1 April 1823, in Koblenz) was a German organist, guitarist and composer.

He was baptised on 3 September 1760, probably one to three days after his birth. In 1784 Hünten was engaged as an organist at the court chapel of Prince Clemens Wenceslaus of Saxony in Koblenz. He married Anna Weller (1750–1816) in 1786, and in 1788 his position as organist was made permanent.

During the French occupation he worked as an administrator, and from 1798 to 1803 he was the proprietor of a reading lounge with German and French newspapers, and also gave organ and guitar lessons. In 1803, although Catholic, he became the organist at the first Protestant church in Koblenz. In 1808 he was appointed professor of harmony and organ-playing at the newly reopened Normalschule, where he taught the young Henri Herz.

Hünten composed organ sonatas, fughettas and hymns, but few of his compositions survive. The only music by Hünten still regularly heard is a setting of Tauet, Himmel, den Gerechten.

He had four daughters and six sons, one of whom was the successful composer Franz Hünten. Two grandsons were painters: Emil Hünten and Daniel Dienz.

== Bibliography ==
- Gerd Zöllner: Franz Hünten. Sein Leben und Werk. Beiträge zur rheinischen Musikgeschichte 34, Köln 1959 (Diss. Köln), Biogramm von Daniel Hünten S. 13–37.
