= Johann Andreas Amon =

German musician (1763–1825)

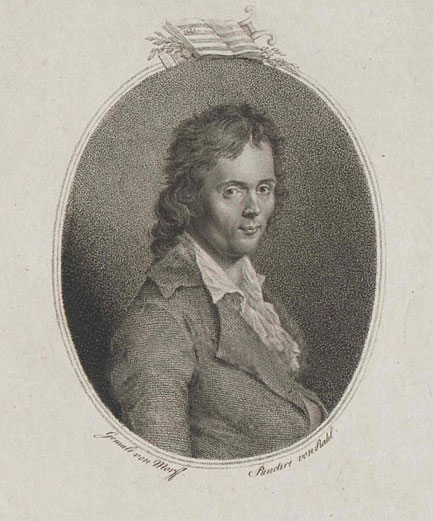
Johann Andreas Amon (1763–1825)

Johann Andreas Amon (1763 – March 29, 1825) was a German virtuoso guitarist, horn player, violist, conductor and composer. Amon composed around eighty works, including symphonies, concerti, sonatas, and songs. He also wrote two masses, various liturgical works, and two operettas.

== Biography ==
=== Early life and education ===
Amon was born at Bamberg, Bavaria in 1763, being first instructed in singing by the court singer Madame Fracassini. During this period, he was also studying the guitar and the violin under Bauerle, a musician of local repute. Young Amon had the misfortune to lose his voice at a very early age and his parents then desired him to study the horn. He was placed under Giovanni Punto, one of the most celebrated masters of this instrument, and he obtained extraordinary skill upon it.

Previous to 1781, he had visited England as a horn player and in that year, when eighteen years of age, he went with his teacher Punto to Paris. After studying with Punto, Amon continued his studies in composition under Antonio Sacchini in 1781. Amon remained in Paris, as a pupil of Sacchini, for the space of two years and then toured with his former teacher, Punto. They travelled throughout France and appeared as a horn duo with great success, and in 1784 arrived in Strasburg. He accepted an engagement in Strasburg and remained in that city for some time and then undertook another extended tour, which included all the important cities of eastern Europe.

=== Musical director at Heilbronn ===
Amon traveled with Punto, often leading his orchestra, until 1789, when he became the musical director at Heilbronn. Amon's excellent playing both of the horn and guitar brought him before the notice of Haydn, Mozart, and many other influential musicians which added considerably to his reputation. In 1789 his health was such that he was compelled to relinquish the playing of the horn, and he then devoted himself to teaching the guitar and piano.

The same year he was engaged as musical director at Heilbronn and on 6 May 1817 he received the appointment of kapellmeister to the Prince of Oettingen-Wallerstein. At his application at the court of Wallerstein, Amon remarked that he had composed more than 80 works, all printed. In August he was awarded the title of "Master for the chapel." He continued in this position until his death at Wallerstein, Bavaria in 1825. Throughout this period in his life, he was a teacher of the guitar and piano. He was very popular, and the number of celebrated pupils he trained was considerable. At the time of his death he was completing a requiem and mass, and the former composition was performed by the members of the Royal Chapel at his funeral obsequies. He was mourned by a daughter and four sons, one of the latter, Ernest, having also published compositions for the flute and orchestra.

== Operas ==
Amon was a very prolific composer and his published works embrace all classes of music. He was the writer of two operas, one of which, The Sultan Wampou, performed in 1791, obtained marked success, and also numerous symphonies, quartets, concertos and solos for the guitar and piano, and songs with guitar accompaniment. Upon his early compositions he styles himself "a pupil of Punto." His vocal works with guitar accompaniment were very popular in his native land, and he published many volumes, each containing six songs. Bone states that Amon's instrumental works are immeasurably superior to his vocal compositions, and are compactly and clearly designed.

== Selected works ==
=== Concerti and symphonies ===
- Concerto No. 1 in A major for viola and orchestra, Op. 10 (1799); The solo viola part is written in the key of G major requiring a scordatura tuning a whole step higher.
- Concerto No. 2 in E major for viola and orchestra; The solo viola part is written in the key of E♭ major requiring a scordatura tuning a half step higher.
- Symphony for orchestra, Op. 30
- Concerto for piano and orchestra, Op. 34 (1805)
- Concerto for flute and orchestra, Op. 44 (1807)
- 6 variations for violin and orchestra, Op. 50
- Symphony for 2 Violins, 2 Violas, Flute, 2 Oboes, 2 bassoons, 2 horns, 2 Trumpets, Timpani, Cello and Bass, Op. 60

=== Chamber music ===
- 4 Waltzes, 2 Eccosaises, and a march for guitar and piano, without opus
- Serenade for Two Corni in D, Flauto Traverso, Violino and Harpe (1786)
- Serenade for Piano, Viola, and Guitar, Op. 83, by after Leonhard von Call, arranged by Johann Amon
- Duos for violin and viola, Op. 1
- 6 Duos for violin and viola, Op. 2 (1791)
- 3 String Trios, Op. 8 (c.1800)
- 3 Sonatas for piano and violin, Op. 11
- 3 Concertante Quartets for solo viola and string trio, Op. 15
- Divertissement for guitar, violin, viola and cello, op. 16
- 3 Quartets for solo viola and string trio, Op. 18 (1803)
- 3 Quintets for flute, viola and string trio, Op. 19
- 3 Quartets for horn, violin, viola and cello, Op. 20
- Receuil de vingt-six Cadences ou Points d'Orgue faciles pour la Flûte, Op. 21
- Recueil de dix-huit cadences ou points d'orgue faciles pour pianoforté, Op. 22
- 3 Sonatas for piano and violin (1805); arranged from 3 Quartets, Op. 9 by Ferdinand Fränzl
- 3 Quartets Alto Violin, Viola & Cello, Op. 25 (1804)
- 6 Songs with piano or guitar accompaniment, Op. 26
- 6 songs with piano or guitar accompaniment, dedicated his friend JD Langl, Op. 32
- Recueil, Suite de l'oeuvre 22 Dix-huit Cadences ou Points d'Orgue faciles pour Piano-Forté, Op. 33
- Theme and variations pour le cor, Op. 35
- 6 Songs with piano or guitar accompaniment, Op. 36
- 6 songs with piano or guitar accompaniment, Op. 38
- 3 Quartets for the flute, Op. 39
- 6 pieces pour musique turque, Op. 40
- 3 Italian songs with German words, with piano or guitar accompaniment, Op. 41
- 3 Quartets for flute, violin, viola and cello, Op. 42 (1806)
- Divertissement for violin, viola, cello and guitar Op. 46 (1807)
- 3 Sonatas for flute, cello and piano Op. 48
- 6 songs with piano or guitar accompaniment, Op. 51
- 6 waltzes for guitar and piano, Op. 52, (1809)
- Sonates Periodiques with flute, Op. 55
- The Lord's Prayer, for voice with piano accompaniment, Op. 56
- 3 Trios for violin, cello, and piano, Op. 58
- Sonates Periodiques with flute, Op. 59
- 6 waltzes for guitar and piano Op. 61, (1812)
- 3 Sonatas for piano Op. 63
- 6 waltzes for guitar and piano, Op. 65
- Sonata in F major for one piano four hands, Op. 67
- 3 Sonatines Faciles pour piano, Op. 68
- 3 Easy duets for guitar and piano, Op. 69 (1824)
- Sonates Periodiques pour piano, Op. 70
- Sonates Periodiques with flute, Op. 71
- 12 pieces for piano, Op. 72
- 3 Sonatas for piano with violin and cello accompaniment, Op. 76
- Air souabe varie pour piano, Op. 78
- Sonates Periodiques pour piano, Op. 83
- 3 quartets for flute, violin, viola and cello, Op. 84
- 5 waltzes for piano, Op. 87
- Sonata Concertante in F major, for bassoon and piano, Op. 88
- Air national Autrichien varie, Op. 91
- 3 Quartets for oboe, violin, viola and cello, Op. 92
- Sonate pour harpe pedales et flute obligee, Op. 95
- 2 sonatas in C and E♭ major for one piano four hands, Op. 99 (1823)
- Sonata in B♭ major for one piano four hands, Op. 100 (1823)
- 2 poems by Ludwig Ernst Craft, for piano, four voices and 3 French horns, Op. 103
- 3 Quartes for clarinet, violin, viola and cello, Op. 106
- 3 Quartets for horn, violin, viola and cello, Op. 109
- Quintet in F Major for Flute, Horn in F, violin, viola and cello, Op 110
- 3 Quartets for 2 violins, viola and cello, Op. 113 (1827)
- Larghetto and 2 different themes for obligatory viola, violin, viola and cello concertante, Op. 115
- Theme by Connu, variations for violin and piano, Op. 116
- Quintet for flute, horn, violin, viola, cello and contrabass ad lib., Op. 118
- 5 variation sets for solo piano, and one piano and four hands (5), Op. 119
- 3 Serenades for piano and guitar, Op. 123
