= Franz Hünten =

German pianist and composer (1792–1878)

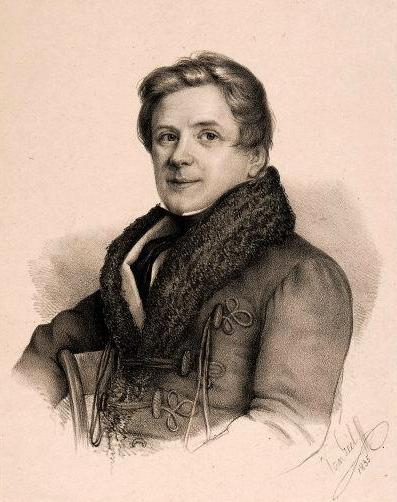
- Born: December 26, 1793
- Died: 22 February 1878 (aged 84)
- Other names: François
- Occupations: Composer and piano teacher
- Children: Emil Hünten
- Father: Daniel Hünten

Franz Hünten, also known as François Hünten (26 December 1792 – 22 February 1878), was a German pianist and composer of salon music.

He was born in Koblenz, the son of the organist Daniel Hünten, who taught Henri Herz. Like Herz, he moved to Paris and entered its Conservatorium in 1819. He wrote pleasant and technically undemanding piano music: rondos, fantasies, variations, dances, etc. Of Hünten's 267 published works, the vast majority were written for piano solo or duet. His first success was Variations militaires à 4 mains, op. 12, a simple imitation of Ignaz Moscheles's variations on the Alexandermarsch, and soon his popularity was such that for one work of ten pages he was paid 2000 francs. Two years after publishing the instruction book Nouvelle méthode pour le piano-forte, op. 60 (1833), he moved back to Koblenz, where he continued to compose; he moved back to Paris after a few years but retired for good in 1848.

Hünten's music was wildly popular throughout France, Germany, and England, but critical notices inevitably described it as trifling and later assessments have been much the same. His brothers, Wilhelm Hünten, a piano teacher in Koblenz, and Peter Ernst Hünten, a piano teacher in Duisburg, also composed piano music of a similar character. His son, Emil Hünten, was a painter.

== Bibliography ==
- Gerd Zöllner: Franz Hünten. Sein Leben und Werk. Beiträge zur rheinischen Musikgeschichte 34, Köln 1959 (Diss. Köln)
- Moritz Fürstenau (1881). "Hünten, Franz" . Allgemeine Deutsche Biographie (in German). Vol. 13. Leipzig: Duncker & Humblot. pp. 421–422.
- Horst Heussner (1972). "Hünten, Franz". Neue Deutsche Biographie (in German). Vol. 9. Berlin: Duncker & Humblot. pp. 742–742. (full text online).
