= Justus Johannes Heinrich Ribock =

German physician and flute player

Justus Johannes Heindrich Ribock (occasionally: Riebock, Riboc) (12 September 1743 – 1785) was a German physician, amateur flute player and designer born in Egestorf, Germany. Son of Pastor Johann Heidrich Ribock (1696–1753), he studied in the University of Helmstedt between 1760 and 1762, and then in Rinteln and Halle, finally graduating as a physician in Göttingen in 1763. He died in Hanover, Electorate of Hanover, in 1785.

Ribock was a friend and later opponent to Johann George Tromlitz's ideas on the flute, with whom he had taken lessons between 1777 and 1783. He wrote the article "Über Musik, an Flötenliebhaber insonderheit" (Magazin der Musik 1, Hamburg, 1783) about improvements as for the design of the instrument and a short treatise entitled Bemerkungen uber die Flöte, und Versuch einer kursen Anleitung zur bessern Einrichtung und Behandlung derselben - Eine Inhaltsübersicht (Stendal, 1782).
