= Anton Bernhard Fürstenau =

German flutist and composer

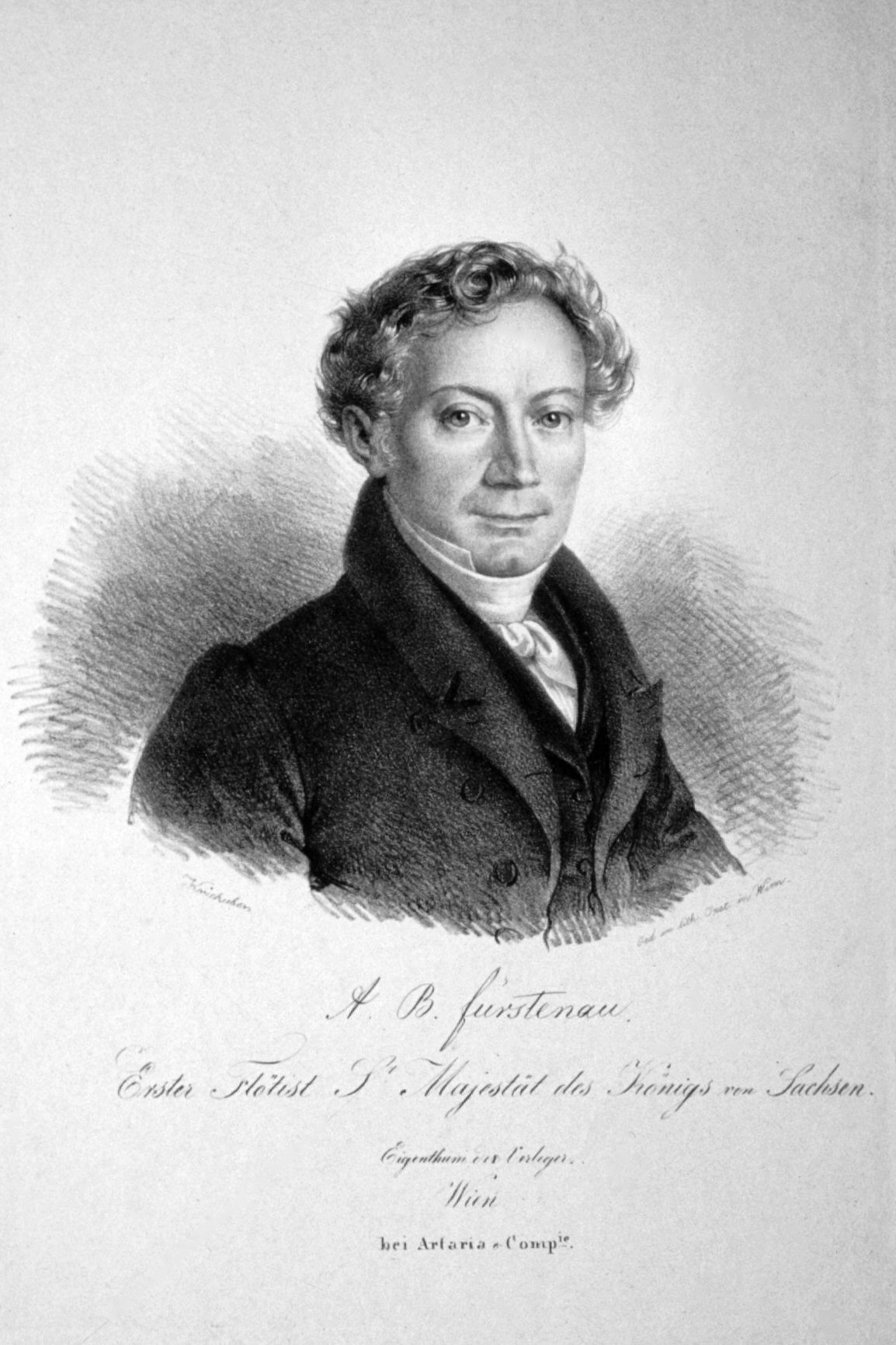
- Anton Bernhard Fürstenau as lithographed by Joseph Kriehuber in 1830.
- Born: 20 October 1792; Münster, Holy Roman Empire
- Died: 18 November 1852 (aged 60); Dresden
- Occupation: Composer
- Notable work: List of compositions
- Style: Romantic

Anton Bernhard Fürstenau (born 20 October 1792 in Münster; died 18 November 1852 in Dresden, Germany) was a German flutist and composer. He was the most famous virtuoso in Germany on his instrument and the most important Romantic flutist of the first half of the nineteenth century. His son Moritz Fürstenau (1824–1889), whom he later sent to study with Theobald Boehm in Munich, was one of his numerous students. Skeptical as to the technical advancements of the flute, he remained faithful to the nine key flute until his death.

== Life ==
Anton Bernhard Fürstenau received his first flute lessons from his father, the flautist Kaspar Fürstenau (1772–1819). As early as the age of seven he performed publicly for the first time and five years later he became a member of the Oldenburg State Court Orchestra. Joint concert tours with his father took him to Berlin, Munich, Copenhagen, St. Petersburg, Vienna and in 1815 to Prague where he met Carl Maria von Weber, with whom he was friendly until his death.

In 1817 Fürstenau became a member of the municipal orchestra in Frankfurt where he received further instructions on harmony and composition lessons with a musician named Volweiler. In 1820 he joined the court orchestra in Dresden as first flutist, led by von Weber at the time. In 1823 he went to Denmark, following to Bavaria in 1824 again on tour. In 1826 he continued with his concert tours in Paris and then to London with von Weber, who was already seriously ill at that time. In that year Fürstenau appeared on the May 1 Philharmonic Society concert with a concerto of his own composition, on a series heavily featuring Weber.

From 1825 to 1844 Fürstenau wrote several articles about musical styles and several manuals for the flute. Among them, The Art of Playing the Flute (German: Die Kunst des Flötenspiels, 1844), which provides a lot of guidelines about playing the classical flute with German and Viennese models.

== Musical works ==
Fürstenau composed and arranged numerous works, mainly for his instrument. His etudes, often reprinted in England and France, remain used in many classrooms. Through his 147 published works for flute, including twelve solo concertos, many variations, rondos and similar items, as well as duos, trios, a quartet for four flutes and compositions for flute and piano, he created new characteristic literature for his instrument. His music is based on that of his contemporaries, notably Carl Maria von Weber. Fürstenau's Concerto for flute and orchestra No. 8 in D major Op. 84 of 1830, is formally very similar to the Violin Concerto No 8 in A minor, in modo di scena cantante (in the form of a singing scene), Op 47 by Louis Spohr written 14 years prior to his own.

=== Compositions ===
- Etudes
  - 26 preludes-cadenzas for solo flute
  - Etude Op. 15
  - Etude Op. 26
  - Large Etudes Op. 29 for solo flute
  - School of Flutes Op. 42
  - 26 Etudes - Book I & II, Op. 107
  - Daily studies Op. 125
  - Caprices for flute solo op. 80
- Rondos and rondinos
  - The Delights of the Opera, Op. 140, No. 2 Rondino based on the opera La part du diable by Daniel Auber
  - Rondino based on La Juive by Fromental Halévy, Op 134 (1) for flute
  - Rondo brilliant Op. 38
  - Adagio and Rondo brilliant Concertante for flute and pianoforte: Dedicated to Catherine Rymenans and her son Mr. Eugene Rymenans by their friend
  - Rondo brilliant for 2 flutes and piano Op. 102
  - Introduction and Rondo brilliant Op. 132 (D-Dur) for two flutes and piano
- Duets, trios and quartets
  - Serenade No 3 Op. 10 for flute, viola and guitar
  - "Quatrième sérénade pour flute, basson, viola and guitar Op. 11
  - Trio for three flutes (2) Op. 14
  - Seconde serenade for flute, basson, viola and guitar Op.14
  - Sixième serenade pour flute, basson, viola and guitar: Op. 18
  - Trios, with Fugues Op. 22
  - Quartet for flute, violin, viola and cello Op. 39 in E major
  - Quartet for flute, violin, viola and cello Op. 60 in A-flat
  - Quartet for flute, violin, viola and cello Op. 62 in F major
  - Trios, with Fugues Op. 66
  - Quartet for flute, violin, viola and cello Op. 74 in G minor
  - Three grand duos concertante for 2 flutes Op. 83
  - The Charms of Maxen Op. 86 for flute, viola and guitar
  - Quartet for four flutes Op. 88 in F major
  - Adagio and polonaise for flute and piano Op.91
  - Cloverleaf, Op. 97 Three pieces: for flute and pianoforte accompaniment: Dedicated to Mr. E. Zedelius, Conseilier S. A. R. le grand duke of Oldenburg by his close friend
  - Three duos concertants for 2 flutes Op. 112
  - L ' union: for 2 flutes & piano Op. 115 (on themes from Norma Bellini)
  - Trio Op. 118
  - "Six easy Duets for 2 flutes Op. 137
  - At the first Lark: Ged. by C. F. Peters for 1 voice with flute and piano Op. 139
  - Liebesruf for soprano, flute and piano Op. 141
- Concertos and concertinos
  - Concerto for Flute No 4 Op. 40 in E minor, accompanied by orchestra or pianoforte: Dedicated to his friend Theobald Boehm
  - Concerto for two flutes Op. 41 in F major
  - Concerto in D major Op. 84 In the form of a singing scene. for flute and Orchestra
  - Concertino Op. 87
  - Concertino for Flute, Op. 100 in B minor (No. 9 of his concertos) with orchestral accompaniment or pianoforte: Dedicated to Christian Heinemeyer
  - Sinfonie Concertante of Ferdinand Fraenzl, arranged for two flutes, two violins, two violas, bass, two oboes, two horns, two Bassoons, two trumpets, and timpani
- Mosaics, nocturnos, fantasias, and variations
  - Variations for flute with accompaniment for Orchestra or piano: op. 27
  - Fantasy for flute and harp Op. 67
  - Variations on a favorite theme of the opera: Der Templer und die Jüdin by H. Marschner: for flute with accompaniment of the orchestra Op. 98
  - Introduction and bravura variations on a theme from the opera "Die Felsenmühle" by Reissiger: for flute with accompaniment of large orchestra or piano Op. 120
  - Mosaic based on the opera Guido et Ginevra by Fromental Halévy, Op 126 for flute
  - Illusion Adagio and variations based on the opera Norma by Bellini for flute and pianoforte Op. 133
  - Mosaic based on the opera L'éclair by Fromental Halévy, Op 134 (2) for flute
  - Fantasy based on Oberon by Carl Maria von Weber, Op 134 (4) for flute and pianoforte accompaniment
  - Nocturno No. 3 with themes of the opera William Tell by Gioacchino Rossini: for flute and pianoforte: Dedicated to Jules Kaskel
  - Introduction and Variations for Flute Brillantes, Op. 70 (work on a theme of the opera La dame blanche by François-Adrien Boieldieu with accompaniment of 2 violins, viola, bass, flute, 2 oboes, 2 clarinets, 2 bassoons, 2 horns, 2 trumpets, timpani, harp and chorus, or pianoforte: Dedicated to Joseph Bacher in Vienna

== Literature ==
- U. Pešek, Ž. Pešek: Flute music from three centuries. Bärenreiter, Kassel (1990). ISBN 3-7618-0985-9
- A. Goldberg: Portraits and biographies of outstanding flute virtuoso, dilettantes and composers. Berlin 1906, Moeck, Celle (1987 Repr.). ISBN 3-87549-028-2
- B. M. H. Schneeberger: The family of musicians Fuerstenau, studies on their life and work. Two parts. Part I: Life and Work, Part II: Thematic bibliographic lists of works, in the Appendix: Theoretical writings, letters; Archival Munster, Eutin - Reviews: PhilDiss, Münster1991 Lit Verlag, Münster / Hamburg (1992)
- Fürstenau, Anton Bernhard: Six Duets Op. 137, Kalmus Edition, Alfred Music Publishing (2000), ISBN 0-7692-9461-8
