= Leonhard von Call =

Leonhard von Call

Leonhard von Call (19 March 1767 – 19 February 1815), sometimes referred to as "Leonhard de Call", was an Austrian composer and virtuoso on the mandolin and guitar. During his lifetime he focused less on performing and more upon teaching and writing music for others to play. A virtuoso, he wrote not for other virtuosos but for the people he was teaching or amateurs, and today it is felt by some musicians that his works "made no great technical demands".

== Life ==
He was born in Eppan an der Weinstraße, South Tyrol. Although his village is in northern Italy today, it was part of the Tyrol in the Holy Roman Empire when he was growing up. Following World War I the area became part of Italy in 1919.

After participating in the War of the First Coalition, which ran 1792 to 1797, he was awarded the Order Pour le Mérite, and became a civil servant at the Imperial Kammerzahlamt (Imperial Chamber Payments Office).

At age 40, he married Maria Wilhelmina Brabee, who was 18 years his junior. They had five children. He died in Vienna.

In 2006, the music school in his hometown was named after him.

=== Career in music ===
Von Call had grown up studying music, practicing with mandolin, guitar and flute, and in 1801, he commenced a professional career in Vienna teaching mandolin and guitar. He wrote for these instruments during this time, and Germans appreciated the flowing melodies combined with simple execution. The success of these works led him to keep writing, mainly for mandolin, violin, flute and guitar, but he also wrote vocal compositions. Several of those were successful as well. His vocal works were given credit by music historian Philip J. Bone as contributing to the formation of Männer gesangvereine (male singing societies) in the early years of the 19th century. He continued to write, and amounted at least twenty collections of vocal compositions in the catalogs of the publishers. He seldom appeared as performer, but continued teaching, until his death in Vienna in 1815.

== Works and their merits ==
He began composing in 1796, and prints of his works were published continuously from 1802 until his death in 1815. Announcements and reviews of his work appeared in the Leipziger Allgemeine musikalische Zeitung, a prominent musical periodical. Many of his works were commissioned by members of the bourgeoisie and the gentry.

=== Guitar method ===
Call was the author of a Method for the Guitar, which obtained success in its day and passed through several editions.

=== Other publications ===
Philip J. Bone labelled the following as "the principal instrumental publications of this writer":

- Opp. 8, 16, 25 and 111, Variations for mandolin or violin and guitar, published by Haslinger, Vienna
- Op. 108, Grand sonata concertante in C for mandolin and guitar
- Opp. 3, 9, 118, 121 and 130, quartets or quintets for guitar, violin, viola and 'cello
- Op. 22 Trois Sonates pour une Guitarre seul for Solo Guitar

Von Call also published trios for guitar with flute, violin or viola. In his duos for violin and guitar, von Call was very successful, and he published more than thirty of these for violin or cello with guitar and also more than twenty guitar duos and a similar number of duos for guitar and piano.

Bone felt that the best of the latter duos are:

- Sonata op. 74
- Serenades opp. 76, 116, 105 and 143, and the Easy trio in C for three guitars op. 26

Many of von Call's vocal compositions were written with guitar accompaniment:

- Opp. 113 and 135, being two volumes of songs with guitar
- Op. 136 a Terzett for soprano, tenor and bass with accompaniment of flute and guitar and another for the same voices entitled The Schoolmaster, with guitar accompaniment.

== Another list ==
He composed about 150 works, mainly for violin, flute and guitar.

His known work consists of the following:

- Chamber music
  - 2 sextets
  - 4 quintets
  - 14 quartets
  - 34 trios
  - 52 duos
  - 12 solos
- Vocal works
  - 17 songs with accompaniment
  - 19 songs without accompaniment
- Bearbeitungen (transcriptions)
