= Otto Baumbach =

- Born: 10 September 1882; Niederwilligen, Germany
- Died: 1966; Alkrington, UK

Otto Baumbach (10 September 1882 – 1966) was the glassblower who built part of the apparatus used by Ernest Rutherford and colleagues in the famous Gold foil experiment. In fact, this experiment has been referred to as the Rutherford-Royds-Baumbach experiment:

The essential feature of that famous experiment - surely the centerpiece of Rutherford's Nobel Lecture ate the same fall - was a tiny glass tube blown so thin (about 1/100 mm) that it allowed α-particles emitted from radium emanation encapsulated within it to penetrate with negligible change in velocity, yet was impervious to helium gas [17-48]. The tube, still preserved in Cambridge, was the handiwork of Otto Baumbach, imported from Germany by Schuster; his role in Rutherford's laboratory is reminiscent of Kamerlingh Onnes' Glasbläsermeister O Kesselring in Leiden and his craftsmanship - witness figure 14.2 in an earlier chapter. (The experiment with Royds is sometimes referred to as the Rutherford-Royds-Baumbach experiment.)

— Per F Dahl, Flash of the cathode rays : a history of J.J. Thomson's electron

It was Baumbach's ability to blow, "fine tubes very uniform in thickness." which led to him being key to Rutherford's work. In fact, such was Baumbach's skill that he was involved in many important experiments and acknowledged on some of the associated publications.

== Career ==
Baumbach started working at the University of Manchester at some time in the early 1900s and certainly before 1905 when an article, published in May that year, stated:

We are indebted to the skill of the University glassblower OTTO BAUMBACH for the accurate grinding of these taps, and for the joints by which he succeeded in fusing hard Jena to soft glass.

He had an independent business selling glassware and building equipment. He supplied Robert Falcon Scott with sample tubes for his 1910 Terra Nova Antarctic Expedition.

After the First World War, he began trading as J.C.Cowlishaw and this business was incorporated in 1925 and continued until it was officially wound-up in 1982.

== Personal life ==
Gottlob Otto Baumbach was born on 10 September 1882 in Niederwilligen, Germany. He studied at the Thüringische Landesfachschule für Glasinstrumententechnik in Ilmenau (Thuringia School for Glass Instrument Technology).

He died in 1966, at the age of 84, in Alkrington, UK.
