= Theobald Boehm =

German inventor and musician (1794–1881)

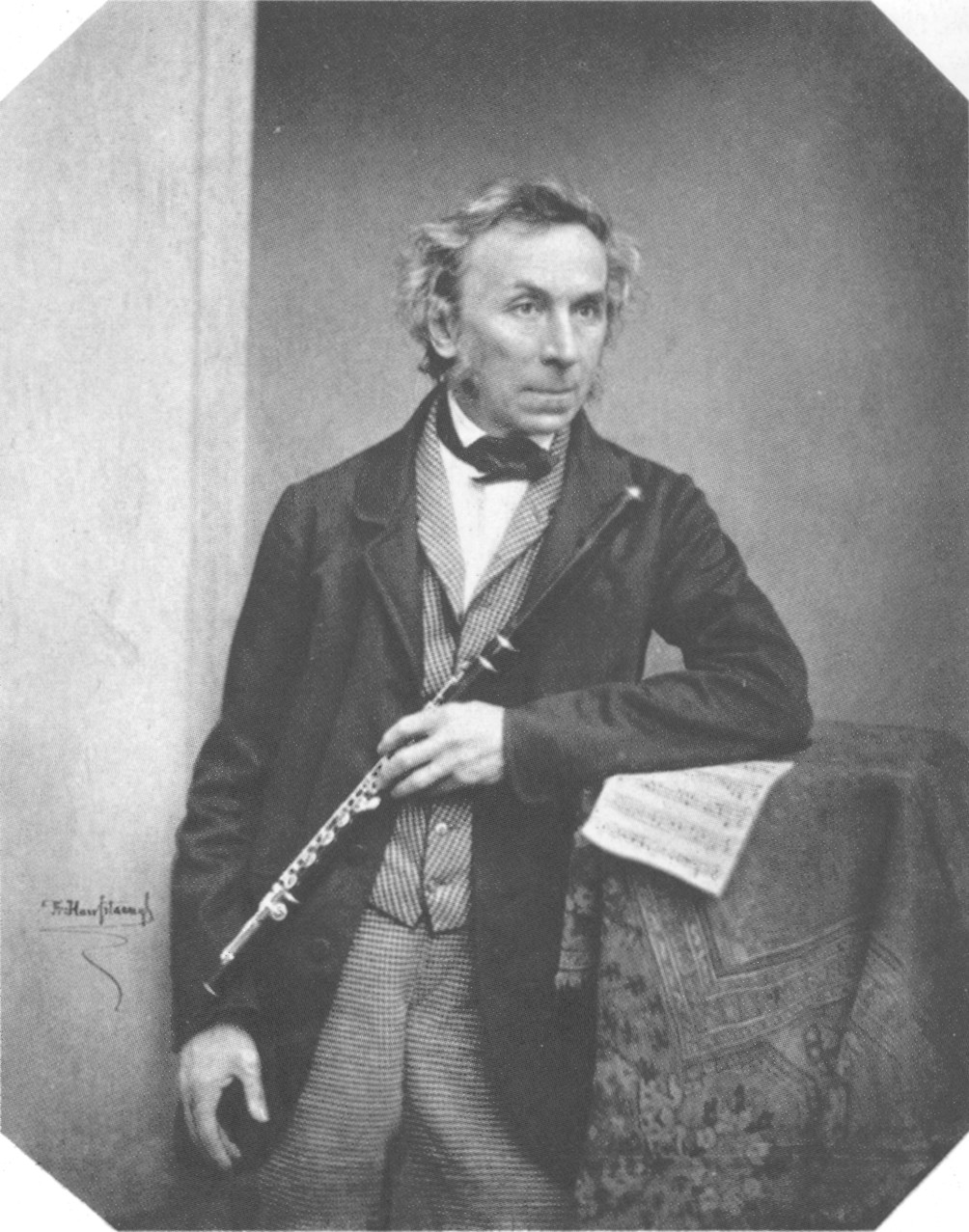
Theobald Böhm, photograph by Franz Hanfstaengl, ca. 1852.

Theobald Böhm (or Boehm) (9 April 1794 – 25 November 1881) was a German inventor and musician, who greatly improved the modern Western concert flute and its fingering system. He was a Bavarian court musician, a virtuoso flautist and a renowned composer.

The fingering system he devised, now known as the "Boehm system", has also been adapted to other instruments, such as the oboe and the clarinet.

== Life and works ==
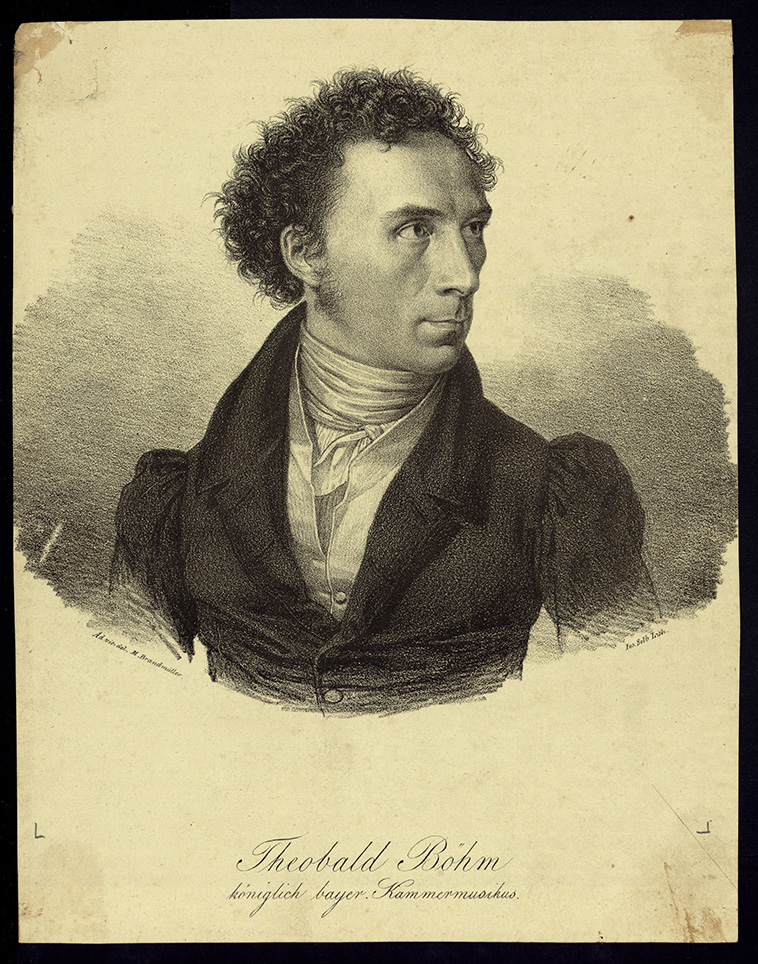
Theobald Böhm portrayed by Michael Brandmüller.

Born in Munich, in the Electorate of Bavaria, to the goldsmith Carl Friedrich Böhm and his wife Anna Franziska (née Sulzbacher), the daughter of a court haberdasher, Böhm learned his father’s trade of goldsmithing in his childhood. This skill enabled him to make his own flute. He became proficient enough to play in an orchestra at the age of seventeen, and at twenty-one was appointed first flautist in the Royal Bavarian Orchestra. Meanwhile, he experimented with constructing flutes out of many different materials—tropical hardwoods (usually Grenadilla wood), silver, gold, nickel and copper—and with changing the positions of the flute's tone holes.

After studying acoustics at the Ludwig-Maximilians-Universität München, he began experimenting on improving the flute in 1832, first patenting his new fingering system in 1847. He published Über den Flötenbau ("On the construction of flutes"), also in 1847. His new flute was first displayed in 1851 at the London Exhibition. In 1871 Boehm published Die Flöte und das Flötenspiel ("The Flute and Flute-Playing"), a treatise on the acoustical, technical and artistic characteristics of the Boehm system flute.

Boehm's experience as a goldsmith was a key factor in his ability to redesign the flute. For example, in The Flute and Flute-Playing he recounts having made a flute with movable tone holes, in order to determine the proper location of each hole for correct intonation—a remarkable piece of metal-working.

Traditional flutes were limited in size because the player had to be able to reach all the tone holes in the span of two hands. By substituting mechanically covered tone holes, Boehm eliminated this limitation, and was able to make larger, deeper flutes, such as the alto flute. Boehm was very fond of the alto flute, and recounts a time he was playing it when someone mistook it for a French horn.

== Legacy ==
Some of the flutes he made are still being played. The fingering system he devised has also been adapted to other instruments, such as clarinet, oboe, and saxophone.

He inspired Hyacinthe Klosé, the inventor of the modern clarinet fingering system. Klosé invented a system for the clarinet that today is the standard nearly worldwide (except Austria, Germany and others). Boehm was his inspiration, and so Klosé named the new system the Boehm system just like the modern western flute. The main differences between the fingering systems of Boehm system clarinets and flutes are overblowing and key. The clarinet's second register is a twelfth above its lowest register, unlike the flute's which is an octave higher. The B♭ clarinet is a transposing instrument, so a C on a clarinet is played as a B♭ on the flute. The clarinet has additional keys to compensate for the increased distance between the registers, and there are other smaller differences, such as the differences in fingerings for F♯.

== Selected works ==
- Grand Polonaise in D Major, Op. 16
- Variations sur un air tyrolien, Op.20
- Fantasie sur un air de F. Schubert, Op.21
- Variations sur un Air Allemand, Op.22
- 24 Caprices-etudes, Op.26
- Souvenir des Alpes, Opp.27–32
- Andante for Flute and Piano, Op.33
- 24 Etudes, Op.37
- Elégie, Op.47

== See also ==
- Friedrich Dülon
- Justus Johannes Heinrich Ribock
