= Frederick August Baumbach =

Frederick August Baumbach (1753 – 30 November 1813, in Leipzig) was a German guitarist, mandolinist and orchestral conductor. Baumbach excelled as a player on the piano, guitar and mandolin; but he is known more through his compositions and writings than his performances. He was characterized as "a man of scholarly and refined taste and great literary attainments."

His musical education was thorough and his progress most rapid, for in 1778, at the age of twenty-five, he was conductor of the Hamburg opera orchestra and in 1782 he was appointed musical director of the theatre, Riga. He occupied this position for seven years, until 1789, at which date he resigned his conductorship to reside in Leipzig as musical composer, author and critic.

His published compositions, which include sonatas for the pianoforte, instrumental trios, concertos, violin duos, songs with piano and guitar accompaniments and studies and solos for the guitar are "all characterized by their noble and profound nature." His first publications, six sonatas for the piano, were published in Gotha in 1790.

Baumbach's guitar compositions include: Sixteen studies as preludes, in all the major and minor keys, Twenty-four progressive pieces, Two airs and two romances as guitar solos, Six romances with variations for guitar solo, Russian air with variations, and a Rondo for guitar solo. These were published in Leipzig by Peters, Hofmeister and the Musical Industrial Agency.

The latter part of his life he devoted almost solely to writing musical articles and criticisms. He was remembered in 1814 as "the author of those interesting articles in the Kurz gefasstes Handworterbuch über die schonen Künste, which appeared in 1794."
