= Moritz Fürstenau =

German flautist and music historian

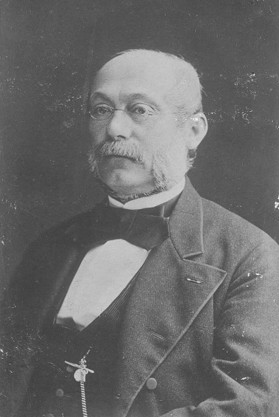
- Moritz Fürstenau as photographed by Robert Eich before 1889.
- Born: Moritz Ignaz Ludwig Carl Franz August Fürstenau; 26 July 1824; Dresden
- Died: 27 March 1889 (aged 64); Dresden
- Occupation: Composer
- Style: Romantic music
- Spouse: Johanna Friederike Wilhelmine née Poser
- Relatives: Camilla (1822–1822); Oskar (1826–1863); Antonia Caroline (1828–1884); Louisa Auguste (1828–1828); Julius Franz Christian (1833–1833); Maria Marianna Adolphina (1834–1845)

Moritz Ludwig Carl Ignaz Franz August Fürstenau (born 26 July 1824 and died on 27 March 1889, also in Dresden) was a German flautist and music historian. He left only a few works that gained little significance, but was extremely helpful as a theater historian.

With his former conductor Richard Wagner, he remained on friendly terms, standing by him even after his departure from Dresden. As an early admirer of him, he was in the 1870s with the founding of the Dresden Wagner Society and as early as 1854, he was already involved in the establishment of the Musicians Association, remaining chairman until his death. He also served as a delegate of the General German Musician Association. For his services he was granted the title of professor of music from the king.

== Life ==
Fürstenau was the second son of the composer Anton Bernhard Fürstenau (1792–1852), from whom he received his first musical lessons, and Maria Anna Elisabeth Friederike Antonia Fürstenau, née Schmidt (1803–1867). At eight, he had made his first public appearance in 1832 in one of his father's concerts. The following year he made his first appearance at the Dresden court. Since then he traveled on tour to Breslau, Halle (Saale) and Weimar, always in the companion of his father. At the request of Saxon King Frederick Augustus III of Saxony, Fürstenau was granted permanent position as flutist at the Royal Chapel of Dresden in 1842, being later promoted to royal chamber musician in 1844.

In the following year Fürstenau undertook a longer study trip to Munich to take flute lessons with Theobald Boehm who had developed a special flute which Fürstenau wanted to present to the Dresden court, the so-called Bohm flute which he later left aside for a more keyed flute. After the death of his father, he took over his duties as curator of the royal private music collection in his hometown in 1852. As such he founded two years later the composer's association which should devote itself to instrumental music, especially the chamber music. The Heinrich-Schütz Archive in Dresden sees itself in the tradition of his historical work.

With the singer Jenny Lind, Fürstenau traveled in 1855 on a grand tour through the Netherlands, while they appeared together as soloists. Frederick Tröstl and Fürstenau were the first instructors at the newly founded private conservatory in 1856. There, besides composition, he gave mostly flute lessons. After the war of 1870, Fürstenau gave up all offices and slowly retired to private life.

== Musical works ==
- The Concorde - Introduction and Rondo Brilliant on Themes from the Opera for flute, clarinet, piano and orchestra in A-flat major
- 12 pieces of Richard Wagner's opera Rienzi, The Flying Dutchman and Tannhauser for flute with piano accompaniment

== Selected works ==
- Fürstenau, Moritz: The deed of foundation of the Royal Saxon musical chapel, Dresden 1848
- Fürstenau, Moritz: Contributions to the History of the Royal Saxon musical chapel, Dresden 1849 (in German)
- Fürstenau, Moritz: Two documents relating to Johann Sebastian Bach, in: Journal of New Music 35 / 1853, No. 17, p. 175 f
- Fürstenau, Moritz: On the history of music and theater at the court of Dresden, 2 vols, Dresden 1861/62
- Fürstenau, Moritz: "Communications on the music collections of the Kingdom of Saxony", in Proceedings of the royal Saxon antiquity association 23/1873, pp. 41–58
- Fürstenau, Moritz: The Musical Activities of the Princess Amalia, Duchess of Saxony, Dresden, 1874;
- Fürstenau, Moritz: "Theaters in Dresden from 1763 to 1777", in Proceedings of the Royal Saxon antiquity association 25/1875, pp. 44–78;
- Fürstenau, Moritz: The Conservatorium of Music in Dresden from 1856 to 1881. Festschrift for the 25th jubilee on 26 January 1881, Dresden 1881

== Literature ==
- Eitner, Robert: Fürstenau, Moritz. In: General German Biography (ADB). Volume 49, Duncker & Humblot, Leipzig 1904, p. 214
- Schneeberger, Bernhard H.: The musical family Fürstenau. Studies on the life and work. Lit Verlag, Münster 1991, ISBN 3-89473-232-6.
  - Volume 1 - Life and Work
  - Volume 2 - Thematic-Bibliographic lists of works

== See also ==
- Kaspar Fürstenau
