= Emil Hünten =

German painter (1827–1902)

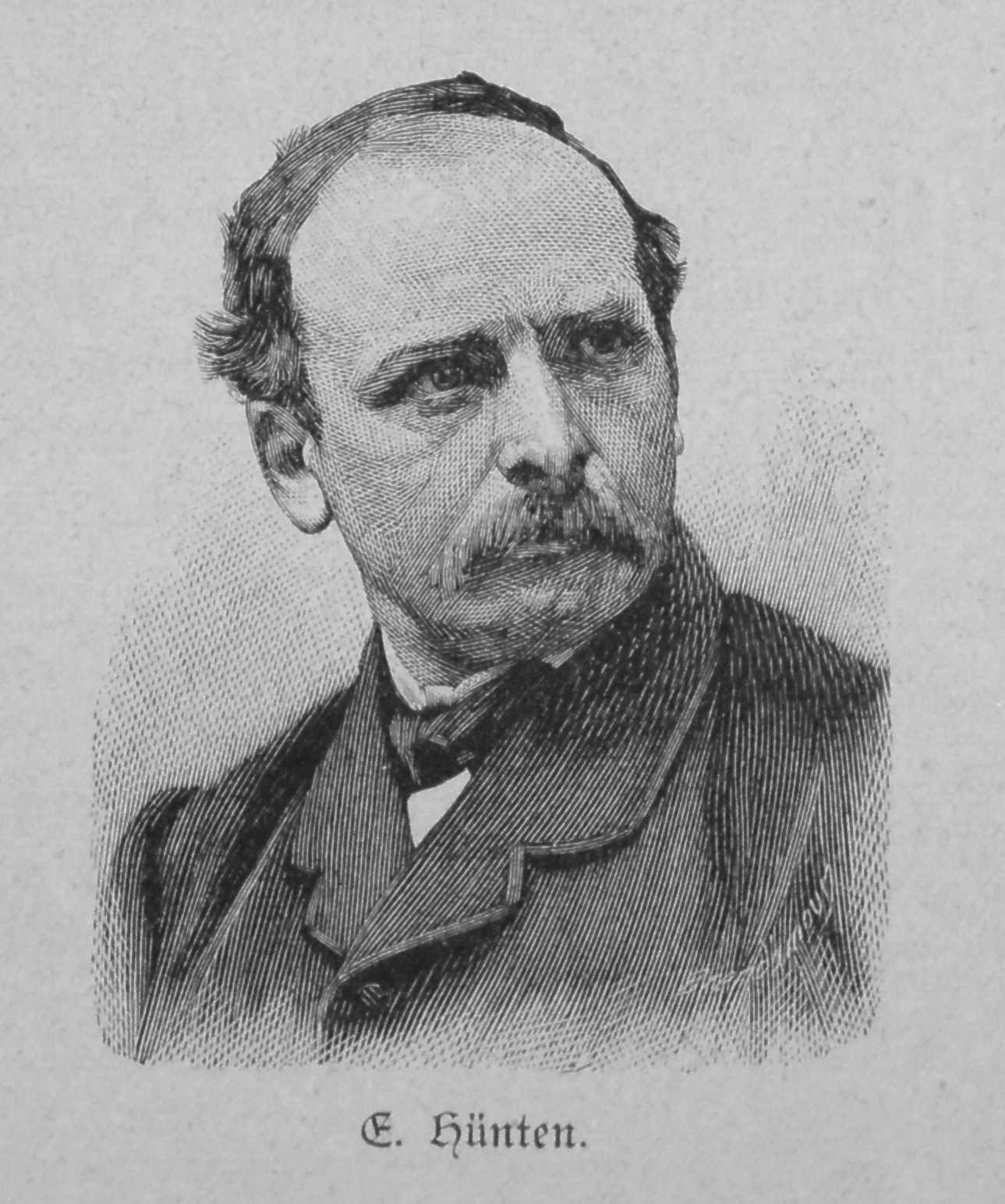
Emil Hünten. Woodcut by Richard Brend'amour

Emil Johannes Hünten (19 January 1827 – 1 February 1902) was a German military painter. His works were often lithographed.

== Biography ==
Born in Paris on 19 January 1827, the son of the composer, Franz Hünten, he studied art under Hippolyte Flandrin and Horace Vernet at the Ecole des Beaux Arts. In 1848, he moved to Antwerp to work in the studios of Gustaf Wappers and Josephus Laurentius Dyckmans, before heading to Düsseldorf in 1851 where his teachers were Julius Lessing and Wilhelm Camphausen.

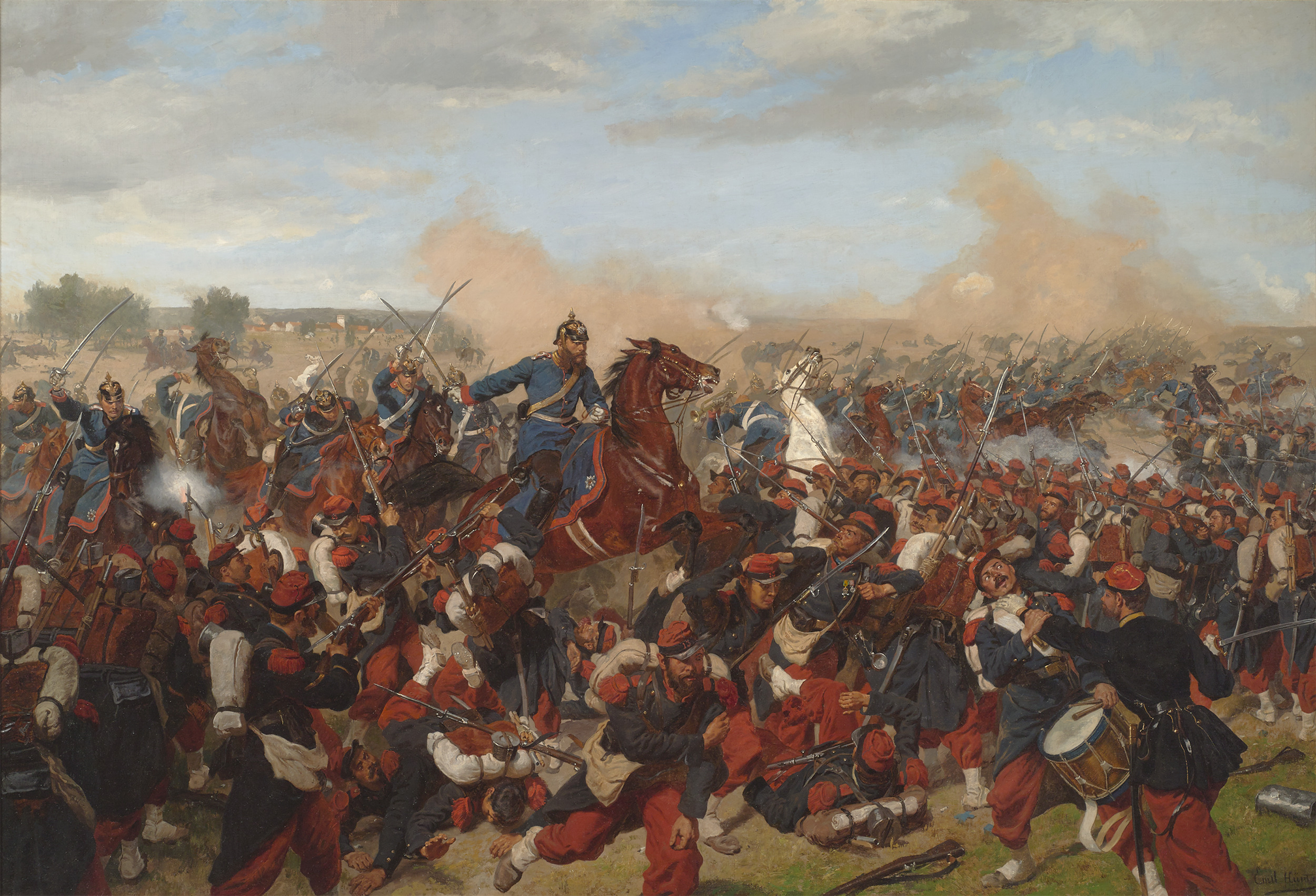
Battle of Mars-La-Tour, 16 August 1870

With such influences, it is not surprising that the artist began to paint historical scenes from the life of Frederick the Great, and gradually turned to military subjects. His work appealed to Crown Prince Frederick William of Prussia who invited him to accompany the army on the campaign in Schleswig-Holstein in 1864. Two years later, Hünten was attached to the Prussian forces in the Austro-Prussian War, and four year later, he covered the Franco-Prussian War.

Among his customers were many famous people. Otto von Bismarck ordered a scene from the Battle of Gravelotte. He won medals for his works at Berlin (1872) and Vienna (1873), and became a member of the Berlin Academy in 1878. He excelled also as a painter of horses. One of his students was the English historical/military artist, Ernest Crofts.

Theodor Fontane was inspired by the Work of Emil Hünten for his novel Wanderungen durch die Mark Brandenburg. In his novel Effi Briest the protagonists visit Hüntens great panorama Battle of St. Privat in Berlin.

He died at Düsseldorf on 1 February 1902.

== Paintings ==
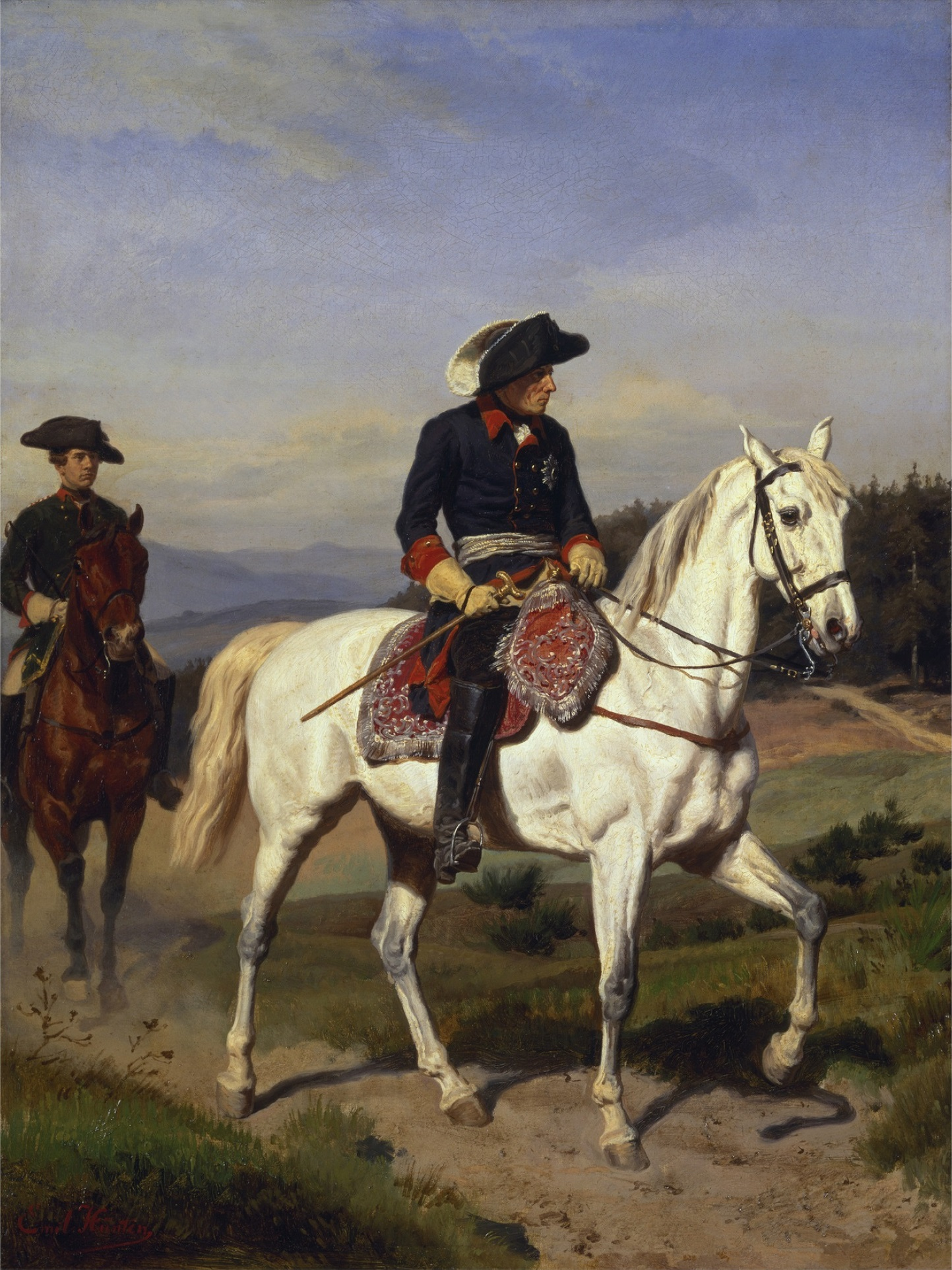
Frederick the Great vor Schweidnitz, 1865

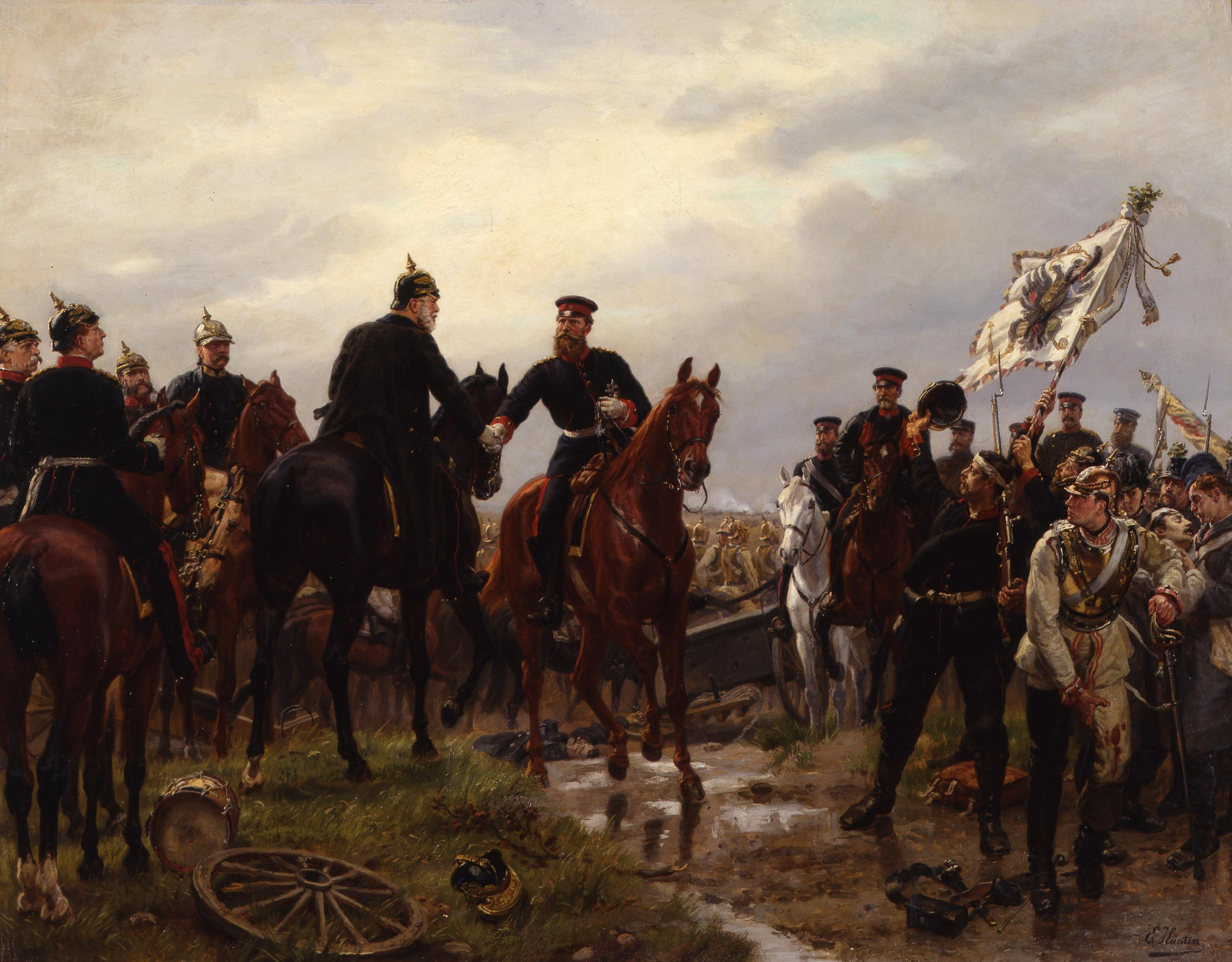
Battle of Königgrätz

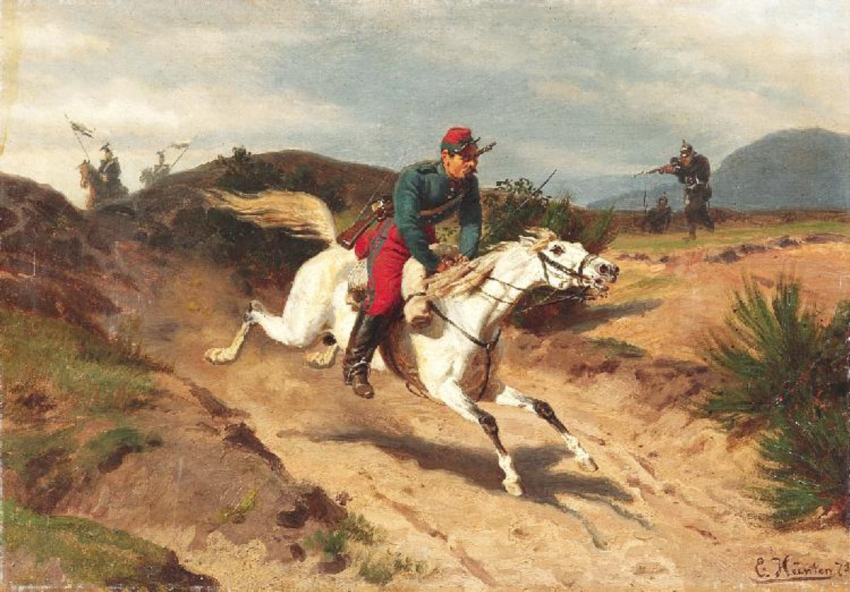
French messenger

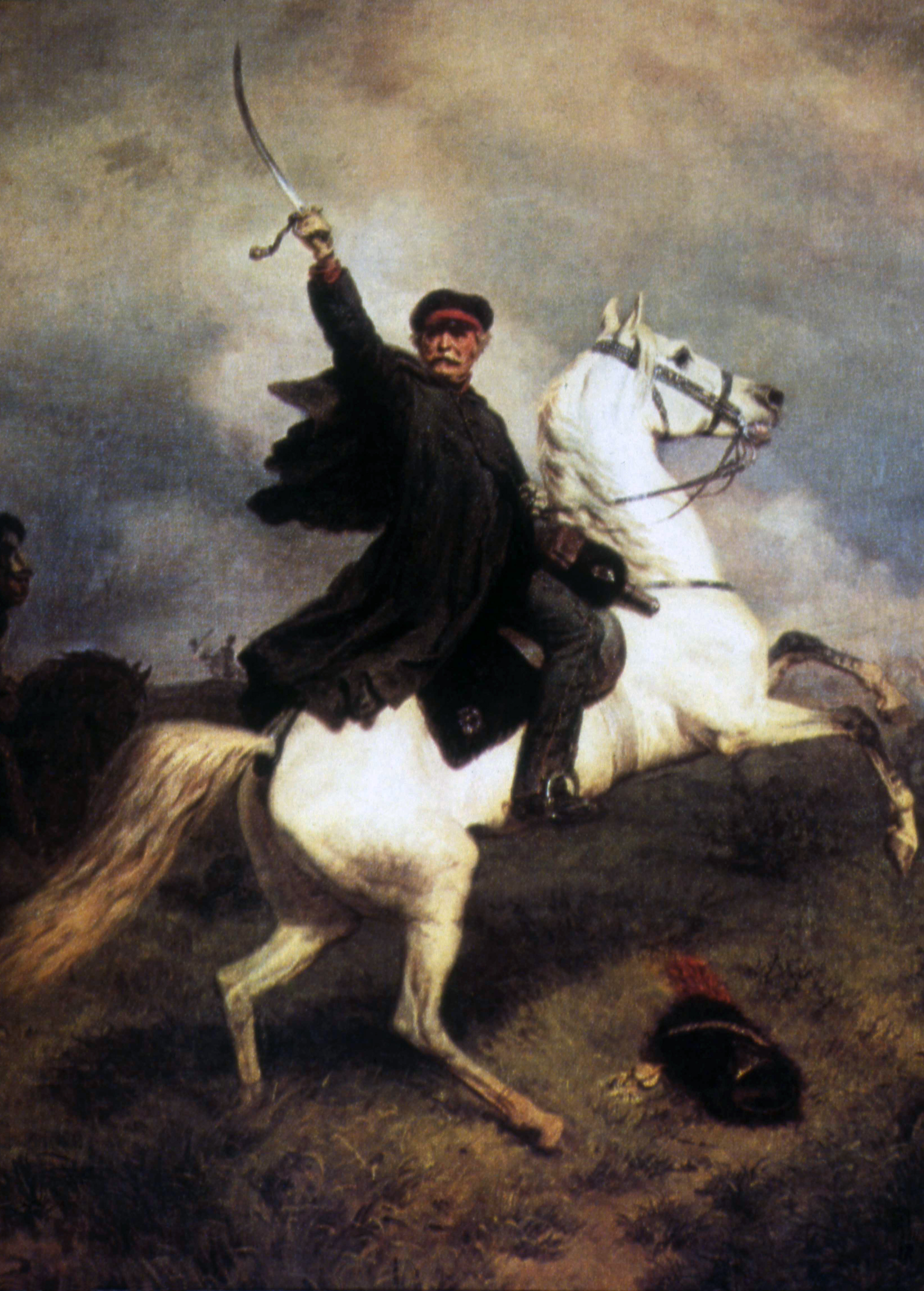
Marshall Forwards

In Germany works by Emil Hünten are on display at the Palast Kunst Museum Düsseldorf, Kunsthalle Kiel (owns al least two works), Deutsches Historisches Museum Berlin, the Lower Saxony State Museum in Hanover and the Bismarck Museum in Friedrichsruh.

- Prussian Cuirassiers dashing over a Bridge (1852–53)
- Skirmish near Hennersdorf (1855)
- Skirmish at Reichenbach (1856)
- Battle of Zorndorf (1858)
- Prince Ferdinand of Brunswick during the Battle of Krefeld, 23 June 1758 (1860)
- From the time of Frederick the Great
- Assault on the Düppel Redoubts (1865)
- Prussia Hussars against Danish Dragoons
- Patrol of Cuirassiers
- General von Nostitz at Oeversee
- Austrian Officer with Flag of Truce
- Reconnoitring at Sadowa
- Skirmish of Patrol near Thorstedt
- Struggle with French Cavalry at Elsasshausen, 6 August 1870 (1877)
- Fall Manoeuvres on the Rhine (1879)
- Battle near Loigny, 2 December 1870 (1882)
- Two Parforce riders (1883)
- Charge of the Cuirassiers at Worth
- The 53rd at Colombey
- Charge of Hussars at Hebecourt
- Guard-Dragoons at Battle of Mars-la-Tour
- The 39th Fusilier-regiment at Gravelotte
- At the Battle of Vionville, 16 August 1870
- The Hessians at St. Privat
- The search
- Chasseurs d'Afrique at Sedan
- The meeting of Bismark and Napoleon after Sedan
