= Kaspar Fürstenau =

German flautist and composer

Kaspar Fürstenau (26 February 1772 – 11 May 1819) was a German flautist and composer. He wrote about sixty compositions for his instrument among rondos, fantasias, suites and concertos. Together with his son Anton Bernhard Fürstenau he traveled extensively around Europe always with acclaimed success.

== Life ==
Kaspar Fürstenau was born in Münster and received his first musical instruction from his father, an oboist of the court orchestra of the Bishopric of Münster. After his father's death, his employer, the prince bishop of Münster Maximilian Friedrich von Königsegg-Rothenfels, organized further training for him with the bassoon teacher Bernhard Anton Romberg.

Fürstenau was booked in 1788 by Maximilian Friedrich's successor, Archduke Maximilian Francis of Austria, in whose court chapel he stayed. Then the flautist Josef Antoni became among other things his teacher. From 1793, Furstenau was again sent by his employer on study trips to the courts of London, Paris and Vienna, to become a member of the court chapel of Augustus, Grand Duke of Oldenburg, who was for some time his teacher from 1794. He died in Oldenburg.

== Selected works ==
- Flute Concerto
- Pot-Pourri by Rodolphe Kreutzer arr. by Kaspar Fürstenau for Flute, two violins and Basse
- Trois thêmes variées for guitar and flute
- Neun leichte Stücke: for 2 flutes and Guitar Op. 10)
- Trio for two flutes and guitar Op. 15
- 12 Pieces for Flute and guitar Op. 16
- Six duos for 2 flutes Op. 20
- Six Duets: for 2 flutes Op. 30
- Pot-Pourri for Bassoon and Orchestra Op. 31
- Suite for flute and guitar Op. 34
- 12 Original-Kompositionen: for Flute and Guitar Op. 35
- Sechs Duette: for flute and Guitar Op. 37
- Twelve pieces: For flute and guitar Op. 38
- 6 Duetten: für 2 Flutes aus Klavier Sonaten gezogen Op. 40

== Literature ==
- Virneisel, Wilhelm: Kaspar Fürstenau. In: Die Musik in Geschichte und Gegenwart, Lfg. 34/35 (1955)

== See also ==
- Moritz Fürstenau
