= List of mandolinists =

This is a list of mandolinists, people who have specifically furthered the mandolin by composing for it, by playing it, or by teaching it. They are identified by their affiliation to the instrument.

== First generation mandolinists (c. 1744 - 1880) ==
- Bartolomeo Bortolazzi (1733-1820)
- Luigi Castellacci
- Giovanni Cifolelli
- Pietro Denis (1720-1790)
- Giovanni Fouchetti (1757-1789)
- Alexandro Marie Antoin Fridzeri
- Carlo Antonio Gambara
- Giovanni Battista Gervasio (c.1762-1784)
- Giovanni Hoffmann (also Johann Hoffmann) (1770-c.1814) (Vienna)
- Vincent Houška (1766-1840) (Czechoslovakia)
- Wenzel Krumpholz (1750-1870)
- Carmine de Laurentiis
- Gabriele Leone;(1732-1770)
- Carlo Sodi (1715-1788)
- Giovanni Vailati (1815-1890)
- Mademoiselle de Villeneuve (1770)
- Pietro Vimercati (?-1850)

== Golden age mandolinists (c. 1880 - c. 1920) ==
- Michele Salvatore Ciociano (1874-1944) (Italy)
- Valentine Abt (1873-1942) (United States)
- Pietro Armanini (1844-1895) (Italy)
- Edgar Bara (1876-1962)
- Giuseppe Bellenghi (1847-1902)
- Giuseppe Branzoli (1835-1909) (Italy)
- Raffaele Calace (1863-1934) (Italy)
- Jules Cottin (1868-1922)
- Ferdinando de Cristofaro (1846-1890)
- Carlo Curti (1859-1926) (Italy, United States, Mexico)
- Bernardo De Pace (1881-1966)
- Herbert J. Ellis (1865-1903)
- James Reese Europe (1881-1919) (United States)
- Giovanni Gioviale (1885-1949) (Italy)
- George H. Hucke (1868-1903)
- Nikolaos Lavdas (1879-1940)
- Salvador Léonardi (1872-1938) (Italy)
- Eduardo Mezzacapo (1832-1898)
- Carlo Munier ( 1859-1911) (Italy)
- W. Eugene Page (American)
- Clarence L. Partee (1864-1915) (Italy, United States)
- Giuseppe Pettine (1874-1966) (Italy, United States)
- Jean Pietrapertosa (1855-1940)
- Silvio Ranieri (1882-1956) (Italy)
- Clara Ross (1858-1954) (England, United States)
- Arling Shaeffer (1859-after 1938) (United States)
- Samuel Siegel (1875-1948) (United States)
- Giuseppe Silvestri (1841-1921)
- Giovanni Vicari (1905-1985) (United States)
- Seth Weeks (1868-1953) (United States)
- Bob Yosco (1874-1942) (Italy, United States)

== Modern mandolinists 1920 to present (deceased) ==
Classical

- Giuseppe Anedda (1912-1997) (Italy) (classical)
- Nino Catania (1907-1985) (Italy)
- Matteo Casserino (1911-2001) (United States)
- Rudy Cipolla (1900-2000) (United States)
- Samuel Firstman
- Kurt Jensen (1913-1911) (Australia)
- Yasuo Kuwahara (1946-2003) (Japan)
- Jiro Nakano (1902-2000) (Japan)
- Takashi Ochi (1934-2010) (Japan)
- Alison Stephens (1970-2010) (Great Britain)
- Morishige Takei (1890-1949) (Japan)
- Konrad Wölki (1904-1983) (Germany)

Blues

- Howard Armstrong (1909-2003) (United States), Tennessee Chocolate Drops
- Willie Black (United States) (blues), Whistler And His Jug Band
- Dink Brister (1914 - 1991) (United States) (blues)
- Rory Gallagher (1948-1995) (Ireland)
- Jim Hill (United States) (blues)
- Charles Johnson (United States) (blues)
- Coley Jones (circa 1880s – 1930s) (United States) (blues), Dallas String Band
- Big Jack Johnson (1940-2011)
- Bobbie Leecan (1897-1946) (United States) (blues), Need More Band
- Alfred Martin (United States) (blues)
- Carl Martin (1906-1979) (United States) (blues)
- Charlie McCoy (1909-1950) (United States) (blues)
- Al Miller (United States) (blues)
- Matthew Prater (United States) (blues)
- Herb Quinn (United States) (blues)
- James "Yank" Rachell (1910-1997) (United States) (blues)
- Johnny Winter (1944-2014) (United States)
- Johnny "Man" Young (1918-1974) (United States) (blues)

Bluegrass

- Charlie Bailey (1916-2004) (bluegrass) (old-time music), The Bailey Brothers
- Bill Bolick (1919-1998) (United States) (country)
- Jethro Burns (1920-1989) (United States) (country/bluegrass/jazz)
- Joseph Allen "Joe" Carr (1951-2014)
- John Duffey (1934-1996) (United States) (bluegrass), Country Gentlemen, Seldom Scene
- Bill Monroe (1911-1996) (United States) (bluegrass)
- Tiny Moore (1920-1987) (United States)(country/bluegrass/jazz)
- Bobby Osborne (1931-2023)
- Tut Taylor (1923-2015)

Carnatic

- U. Srinivas (1969-2014) (India)

Choro

- Jacob do Bandolim (1918-1969) (Brazil) (Choro, Samba-canção

Country

- Karl Davis (1905-1979) (Country music), Renfro Valley Boys, Cumberland Ridge Runners
- Walter Louis "Hank" Garland (1930-2004)
- Pee Wee Lambert (1924-1965) (United States) (Country music), Stanley Brothers

Gospel

- Katie Bell Nubin (United States) (gospel)

Jazz

- Dave Apollon (1898-1972) (United States) (jazz)
- Sinn Sisamouth (c. 1932- c. 1976)

Old Timey

- Mike Seeger (1933-2009)

Southern rock

- Allen Woody (1955-2000), The Allman Brothers Band, Gov’t Mule

== Modern mandolinists 1920 to present ==
=== Mainly classical ===
Australian

- Paul Hooper

Belgium

- Ralf Leenen

Royal Estudiantina La Napolitaine

Bulgaria

- Oleg Videnov

France

- Marine Moletto
- Vincent Beer-Demander
- Cécile Valette, Nov' Mandolin Trio
- Annick Robergeau
- Olivia Tarallo-Valgelata
- Cécile Valette

Germany

- Marga Wilden-Hüsgen
- Veronika Schlereth
- Sabine Spath
- Steffen Trekel, Duo Trekel-Tröster
- Detlef Tewes

Great Britain

- Simon Mayor
- Frances Taylor

India

- U. Rajesh

Israel

- Avi Avital
- Jacob Reuven, Kerman Mandolin Quartet, Barrocade
- Alon Sariel

Italy

- Carlo Aonzo
- Andrea Bazzoni
- Matthew Bonizzoni, International Mandolin Orchestra
- Emanuele Cappellotto
- Céline Cellucci, Ensemble Gabrielle Leone, Pizzicato Ensemble
- Freddy Colt
- Dorina Frati
- Fabio Gallucci, Nov' Mandolin Trio
- Maria Cleofe Miotti
- Ugo Orlandi (Italy)
- Roberto Palumbo
- Giorgio Pertusi, International Mandolin Orchestra
- Amelia Saracco

I Solisti Veneti

- Mauro Squillante
- Clara Ponzoni
- Miriam Zaniboni, International Mandolin Orchestra

Japan

- Ryo Aoyama
- Onishi Kozo
- Izumi Toru

Netherlands

- Ferdinand Binnendijk
- Marina Eckhardt

Portugal

- Fabio Machado
- Norberto Gonçalves da Cruz

Puerto Rico

- Gustavo Batista -

Russia

- Natalya Kravets
- Natalia Marashova
- Elena Zabavskay
- Ekaterina Mochalova

Spain

- Héctor M. Marín Téllez
- Juan-Carlos Muñoz

Switzerland

- Giorgio Borsani
- Giorgio Caneva, Orchestra mandolinistica di Lugano
- Paolo Stirnimann, International Mandolin Orchestra

United States

- Butch Baldassari (bluegrass)
- Joseph Brent
- John Craton (classical)
- David Evans
- Neil Gladd (Classical)
- Marilynn Mair, Mair-Davis Duo, Mandolin World Summit, Enigmatica
- Evan Marshall
- Emanuil Sheynkman
- Radim Zenkl (Czechoslovakia) (bluegrass, jazz), Mandolin World Summit
- Modern Mandolin Quartet, 1985 to present

=== Blues ===
- Ry Cooder (United States)
- Billy Flynn (United States)
- Alvin Youngblood Hart
- Jimi Hocking (Australia)
- Gerry Hundt (United States)
- Steve James (United States)
- Pokey Lafarge
- Barry Mitterhoff
- Otis Taylor (United States)
- Hans Theessink (Netherlands)

=== Bluegrass, Americana, Old Timey ===
- Lloyd Armstrong
- Jeff Austin, Yonder Mountain String Band
- Alan Bibey, Baucom, Bibey, Graham & Haley
- Robert Bowlin
- Jesse Brock
- Sam Bush
- Mike Compton
- Sharon Gilchrist
- David Grisman
- David Harvey (luthier)
- Sierra Hull
- Sarah Jarosz
- Doyle Lawson
- David Long
- Mike Marshall
- Ronnie McCoury, Del McCoury Band
- Jesse McReynolds
- Barry Mitterhoff
- Tim O'Brien
- Georgi Palmov (Russia), Kukuruza, Seldom Scene
- Tom Rozum
- Sandy Rothman, Jerry Garcia Acoustic Band
- Jon Sholle
- Ricky Skaggs, Clinch Mountain Boys, The Country Gentlemen, Kentucky Thunder
- Johnny Staats
- Andy Statman
- Adam Steffey
- Bryan Sutton
- Chris Thile (classical), Punch Brothers, Nickel Creek
- Niall Toner (Ireland)
- Graham Townsend
- Joe Val
- Rhonda Vincent
- Frank Wakefield
- Kym Warner (Australia)
- Sean Watkins
- Roland White
- Paul Williams, The Sunny Mountain Boys

=== Choro ===
- Hamilton de Holanda
- Déo Rian

=== Country ===
- Vince Gill (United States)
- Johnny Gimble
- Cheyenne Kimball
- Ira Louvin
- Martie Maguire of Dixie Chicks and Court Yard Hounds
- Emily Robison, Dixie Chicks, Court Yard Hounds
- Marty Stuart (United States)
- Oscar Sullivan, Lonzo and Oscar
- Lisa Theo, Ranch Romance
- Charlie Worsham

=== Mix: Americana, American folk, progressive bluegrass, blues, jazz, rock, country ===
- Larry Campbell (rock, blues, country, folk and Celtic styles)
- Ry Cooder
- Steve Earle
- David Grisman
- Sarah Jarosz
- David Lindley (musician)
- Peter Ostroushko

=== Irish ===
- Paul Brady
- Andy Irvine (Ireland)
- Paul Kelly (Ireland)
- Mick Moloney (Ireland)
- Johnny Moynihan (Ireland)
- John Sheahan (Ireland)

=== British folk and folk rock ===
- Ritchie Blackmore

Blackmore's Night

- Chris Leslie, Fairport Convention, Whippersnapper, St.Agnes Fountain (Band)
- Graham Lyle, McGuinness Flint
- Dave Swarbrick, Fairport Convention

=== Rock ===
- Ian Anderson (Great Britain), Jethro Tull
- Eric Bazilian, mandolin part of Joan Osborne's St. Teresa
- Tim Brennan, Dropkick Murphys
- Peter Buck (United States), R.E.M., mandolin part of Losing My Religion
- Dash Crofts, Seals and Crofts
- Rory Gallagher (Ireland), Going to My Hometown
- David Gilmour, Pink Floyd
- David Grisman

mandolin part on Grateful Dead's Friend of the Devil

- Levon Helm, The Band
- Chris Hillman, The Byrds, mandolin part of Sweet Mary
- Ray Jackson, mandolin part of Rod Stewart's Maggie May, Lindisfarne (band)
- John Paul Jones (United Kingdom), Led Zeppelin, mandolin part of Gallows Pole
- Bernie Leadon (United States)
- Jimmy Page (United Kingdom), Led Zeppelin
- Mick Ronson, Mott the Hoople, :mandolin part of I Wish I was Your Mother
- Jack White (United States), The White Stripes
- Pete Zorn (United States / United Kingdom), Richard Thompson's touring band, Steeleye Span

=== Jazz ===
- Joseph Brent
- Michael Kang

The String Cheese Incident

- John Kruth
- Tim Ware

== Gospel music / klezmer ==
- Andy Statman (klezmer, bluegrass)

== Mandolin orchestras ==
- Mandolin Society of Peterborough
