= Jules Cottin =

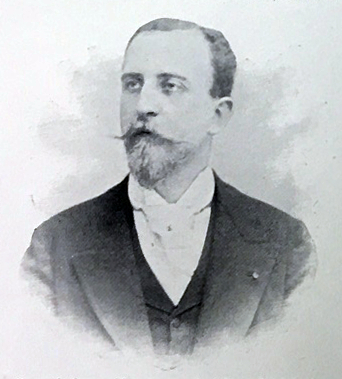
Jules Cottin, about 1901.

Advertisement from 1914 for the works of Jules Cottin and his siblings, Madeleine and Alfred, taken from the book The Guitar and Mandolin by Philip J. Bone.

Jules Cottin (1868–1922) was a mandolin virtuoso who played in Paris from the 1890s. A pupil of the guitarist Jacques Bosch, he became part of the mandolin revival, which revitalized the instrument after its long decline in the 19th century. He was part of a group of virtuosi mandolinists, including Giuseppe Silvestri, Ferdinando de Cristofaro, and Jean Pietrapertosa, who played before enthusiastic Paris audiences. He was also a composer and author, writing the 1891 mandolin method book, Celèbre Méthode Complète Theoretique et Pratique de Mandoline.

Cottin played in Paris with his brother Alfred (1863–1923), who played guitar, and his sister Madeleine (1876 – d. after 1952). His siblings were also composers and, like Jules, his sister wrote a mandolin method book.

== Selected works ==
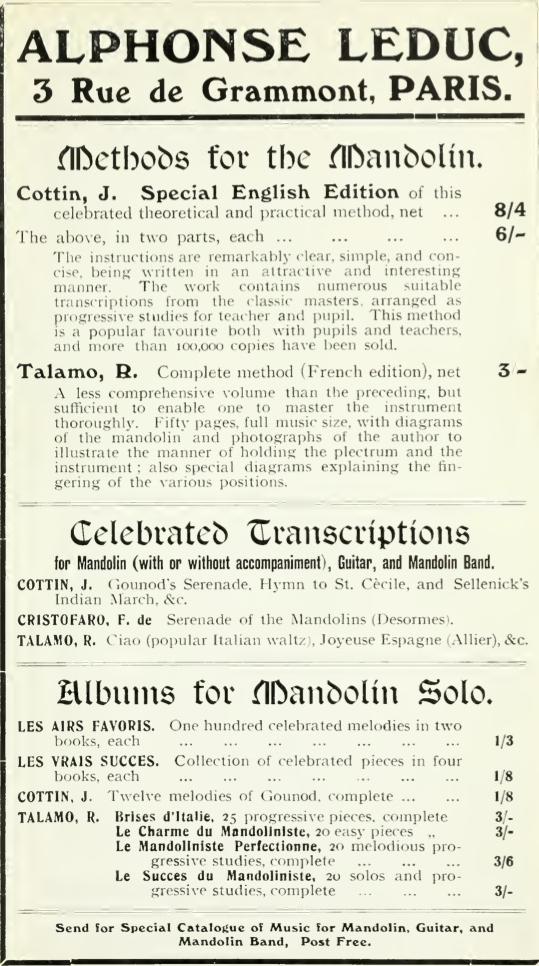
Advertisement by Alphonse Leduc of Paris for mandolin music by Jules Cottin, R. Talamo, and Ferdinando de Cristofaro. From Philip J. Bone's book, The Guitar and Mandolin.

=== Compositions ===
- Au fil de l'eau. Barcarolle for mandolin & guitar.
- Succès-Mandoline. Morceaux pour mandoline seule (Paris: J. Hamelle, 1900)
- Contemplation. Romance sans paroles (Paris: E. Weilter, 1902)
- Études mélodiques d'agilité pour mandoline (Paris, 1907; also: Paris: M. Jumade, 1914)

=== Method ===
- Méthode élémentaire de mandoline (Paris: A. Leduc, 1903). English edition: Complete Theoretical and Practical Method for the Mandoline (Paris: A. Leduc, 1896-1906)

== See also ==
- List of mandolinists (sorted)
