= Kurt Jensen =

Kurt Jensen may refer to:

- Kurt Jensen (musician) (1913–2011), Danish-Australian mandolin player
- Kurt Jensen (computer scientist) (born 1950), Danish computer science professor
