= Armanini =

Armanini is a surname. Notable people with the surname include:

- Michael Armanini, American politician
- Pietro Armanini (1844–1895), Italian mandolin virtuoso
