= Lambert-Joseph Meerts =

- Born: 6 January 1800; Brussels, Belgium
- Died: 12 May 1863 (aged 63); Brussels, Belgium
- Spouse(s): Jeanne Van der Plancken, Josephine Bartholomé
- Children: Edouard Meerts, Marie Mélanie Meerts, Adolphe-Jules-Joseph Meerts, Jean-Baptiste Meerts
- Awards: Order of Léopold

Lambert-Joseph Meerts (Brussels, 6 January 1800 - Brussels, 11 May 1863) was a Belgian violinist and teacher.

== Early life ==
Lambert-Joseph Meerts began his career as a violinist out of necessity due to a family misfortune. At the age of fourteen he was employed as a violinist and assistant at the theater of Antwerp, Belgium. From this period he began studying with Alexandro Fridzeri who instilled in him an appreciation for the Italian masters. He later continued his studies with the French violinists Charles Philippe Lafont, François Habeneck and Pierre Baillot.

== Career in Brussels ==
Meerts married Jeanne Van der Plancken, daughter of the violinist Corneille Van der Plancken, in 1823. He became a member of the Brussels theater (La Monnaie/De Munt) in 1828 and concertmaster of the orchestra in 1832. In 1833 François-Joseph Fétis became director of the Brussels Conservatory and Meerts briefly studied composition with him. Meerts taught violin at the Brussels Conservatory from 1836-1849 and 1853-1863. During his leave of absence between 1849 and 1853 he was replaced by Hubert Léonard.

Fétis had great praise for Meerts' publications which he said placed the orchestra of the Brussels Conservatory amongst the best in Europe. He also said that the violinists Henri Vieuxtemps, Joseph Joachim, Hubert Léonard, Camillo Sivori, and Ferdinand Laub had the greatest respect for Meerts' work. Meerts received the Order of Léopold for his pedagogical publications in 1855.

== Works (all for violin) ==
- 12 Etudes
- Le Mécanisme du violon
- 12 Etudes élémentaires
- Etudes rythmiques (12 volumes)
- Méthode élémentaire de violon
- 6 Fantaisies caractéristiques
