= Arling =

Arling is a given name and a surname.

Notable people with the given name include:

- Arling Shaeffer (1859–1943), American composer and arranger

Notable people with the surname include:

- Arthur Arling (1906–1991), American cinematographer and cameraman
- Charles Arling (1875–1922), Canadian actor

== See also ==
- Arling & Cameron
- List of hundreds of Sweden
