= Heugel =

Heugel can refer to:

- Heugel, French music publishing house, founded in 1839, later part of Éditions Alphonse Leduc

Surname

- Johannes Heugel (c. 1510 – c. 1585), German composer
- Henri Heugel, music publisher, son of Heugel´s founder Jacques-Léopold Heugel
- Michael Heugel, guitarist for Battlecross
