= Giovanni Gioviale =

Italian composer

Giovanni Gioviale (November 1885 – June 11, 1949) was an Italian composer and musician. He is considered one of the greatest mandolin virtuosos of all time. He also played guitar and banjo, and at the concert level with violin. He is special among the Italian mandolin masters, as one of the only ones to be recorded. He has also been credited for making famous the duo style of mandolin playing, in which one instrument sounds like several.

Born Catania, Gioviale took up the mandolin when he was ten-years old. He was impressed by the music he heard at a barbershop. Craft halls were one of the types of place one could hear music in Catania then. He learned the mandolin first, then added banjo, guitar and violin, which he learned in school.

He was an internationally travelling performer, performing in Spain, Africa, England, Austria and the United States. While in the United States, from 1926 to 1929, he recorded more than 50 recordings. After three years in the U.S., he missed his home and moved back to Italy. He was planning to return when he died in 1949.

He continued to perform in Italy, playing in Turin, Milan, Rome, Genoa, and Palmero. In addition to his own works, he performed works by Francesco Paolo Frontini, Cali, Vincenzo Bellini, Mozart, Edvard Grieg, Amilcare Ponchielli, Giuseppe Verdi, Felix Mendelssohn, and Pietro Mascagni.

== See also ==
- List of mandolinists (sorted)
