= Fabio Machado =

Portuguese mandolin virtuoso (born 1985)

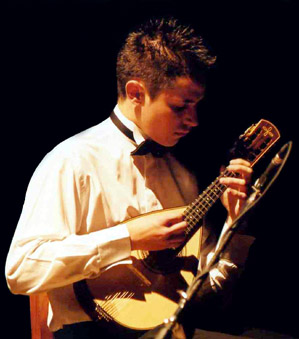

Background information
- Born: 17 June 1985 (age 40); Funchal, Madeira
- Origin: Portugal
- Genres: Classical
- Occupation(s): Musician, mandolinist
- Instrument: Mandolin
- Years active: 1994–present
- Website: www.fabiomachado.com

Fabio Machado (Funchal, Madeira, 1985) is a Portuguese mandolin virtuoso.

== Biography ==
Fabio Machado was born in Funchal and started studying mandolin at the age of 9 years. He joined the Madeira Mandolin Orchestra (Recreio Musical União da Mocidade) and became its Concertmaster for several years, performing in several venues as a soloist. He studied at the Conservatory "Cesare Pollini" in Padua, under the instruction of well renowned instructor and artist Dorina Frati.

In 1998, he toured central and northern Portugal, performing in Águeda, Vila do Conde, Benavente, Santarém and Expo 98. In 2002, he had a successful concert tour in the United Kingdom, performing in several English cathedrals such as St. George's Bristol, and in the St. George's Chapel, Windsor. This last concert was officially inserted in the celebrations of Queen Elizabeth II's Golden Jubilee.

Machado is mostly known for having performed some Caprices of N. Paganini, and the recording of a DVD playing the Chaconne in G minor of Tomaso Vitali. Besides having recorded 2 CDs and a DVD with the Madeira Mandolin Orchestra, he performs regularly in Italy, Germany, England, Portugal and the USA.

Machado is particularly fond of contemporary music and a mandolin work has been specially written for him by the Norwegian composer Oddvar Kvam, "A Special Day" for Mandolin and Piano.

== Videos ==
- Videos of Fabio Machado
