= Nikolaos Lavdas =

Greek conductor, composer, and educator

Nikolaos Lavdas Νικόλαος Λάβδας
- Born: 1879; Pitrofos, Andros, Greece
- Died: March 30, 1940 (aged 61); Athens, Greece
- Education: PhD in Physics from the University of Athens; Athens Conservatory under Dionysios Lavragkas
- Alma mater: University of Athens
- Occupations: Conductor; composer; educator
- Awards: First prize in Cremona for Conducting (1910); Cross of the Savior from King George I of Greece
- Musical career
- Genres: Classical music; Greek traditional music
- Instruments: Mandolin; guitar

Nikolaos Lavdas (Greek: Νικόλαος Λάβδας; 1879 – 30 March 1940) was a Greek conductor, composer and educator. He was the founder and director of the "Athenian Mandolinata", one of the oldest music associations and music schools in Greece.

== Early life and education ==
Born in Pitrofos, Andros, Greece, in 1879. Levdas pursued his higher education in Athens, Greece, where he studied and obtained a PhD in physics from the University of Athens, and he studied at the Athens Conservatory, where he took private classes with Dionyssios Lavrangas. While still a student, he started working towards the formation of a musical ensemble, and in 1896 he formed a mandolin quartet (2 mandolins, mandola, guitar) with his brother Konstantinos Lavdas and Vassileios Mitsou. The name "Athenian Mandolinata" made its first appearance that year.

== Career ==
Four years later, he formed an ensemble made up of 20 musicians and gave his first concert in the "Parnassus" hall in Athens on May 26, 1900. The success of this appearance led to the formal establishment of the "Athenian Mandolinata". By 1901 the Mandolinata had its own conservatory, teaching various instruments (mandolin, guitar, violin, cello, flute), vocal music and music theory. As the director of the "Athenian Mandolinata" orchestra, he conducted the orchestra in the interim Olympic Games of Athens (1906), for the king of Italy Vittorio Emmanuele (1907) and for Kaiser Wilhelm in Corfu's "Achilleion" (1910). The orchestra started performing abroad, too, with appearances in Cairo and Alexandria (1907), Smyrna (1908), New York (1912). One of the most important moments for the orchestra and its conductor was in 1910, when they received the first prize in Cremona, competing among 32 ensembles from all over Europe, and Nikolaos Lavdas received the first prize for conducting.

Nikolaos Lavdas held the post of director of the Orchestra and Conservatory, while Zakharias Papantoniou was its first president, and Prince Nikolaos of Greece its honorary president.

Nikolaos Lavdas was a great composer writing very important music, which creatively combines classical music, that he knew in great depth, with Greek traditional music, that he had also deeply experienced. Through his compositions, one can see the continuity of the Greek music throughout the centuries, as well as its close connection with various classical music forms developed in Western Europe. Some of his compositions for mandolin orchestra are: "Greek overture", "Balos from Andros", "Cretan dance", "Varkarola", "Serenata", "Grecitta" etc. He also wrote piano and vocal variations of Greek traditional music ("Voskopoula", "Tsopanakos", "Tria paidia Voliotika", "Ta matia tou Dimou" etc.).

Nikolaos Lavdas was also an educator, not only within the Athenian Mandolinata Conservatory, but also in the "Arsakeion School", as well as in the Schools of the "Philekpaideftiki Etairia" (1913–1937). He was also a state-appointed general inspector of music in high school education (1937–1940). He wrote mandolin and guitar method books, and a theory of music textbook. Among his students were Dimitris Dounis, Ilias Alessios, Konstantinos Kydoniatis, Spyros Skiadaresis, Miltiades Koutoungos, and his nephew Antonis K. Lavdas.

Nikolaos Lavdas and his brother Konstantinos Lavdas, were founding members of AEPI (the Greek equivalent to GEMA, BMI etc.). In recognition of his great achievements in music, he received the Cross of the Savior from King George the first of Greece. The outbreak of World War II and the death of Nikolaos Lavdas in 1940 resulted in the dissolution of the orchestra and the conservatory. The Mandolinata, under the name "Athenian Mandolinata Nikolaos Lavdas" was re-established in 2011 in Athens. The orchestra aims to disseminate the heritage of works by both Greek and non-Greek composers, and also to encourage and promote contemporary artistic production. The Mandolinata, in collaboration with Ugo Orlandi, organizes seminars aiming at acquainting musicians with a wider repertory, giving incentives for a more systematic and complete study.

== Death ==
Nikolaos Lavdas died in Athens, Greece on 30 March 1940.
