= Pio Manzù International Research Centre =

Italian centre for study of eco-economics

The Pio Manzù International Research Centre, commonly referred to as the Pio Manzù Research Centre or Pio Manzù Centre, was a non-governmental environmental organization of the United Nations founded in 1969 and based in Rimini, Italy. The purpose of the centre was to serve as an "institute for the in-depth study of the main economic and scientific aspects of the relationship between man and his environment". The centre helds an annual conference in Rimini, Italy, along with carrying out research projects and publishing the journal Environmental Structures.

As of 2007, the Pio Manzù Center has Lorenzo Cagnoni as president, Roberto Valducci as vice-president, and Gerardo Filiberto Dasi as general secretary. The centre also has an International Scientific Committee where Mikhail Gorbachev is president and Giandomenico Picco is vice-president.

The centre closed in 2016

== History ==
The Pio Manzù International Research Centre was founded in 1969 by Girardo Filiberto Dasi and 14 other academics.

The centre was named in honor of Italian designer Pio Manzù after he died in a car crash. Manzù was also a founding member of the International Research Centre on Environmental Structures and designed cars including the Fiat 127.

== Annual conference ==
The centre has hosted an annual conference in Rimini, Italy, since the founding of the centre in 1969. During this conference, the centre's International Scientific Committee also awards the Medal of the President of the Italian Republic and the Gold Medal of the Pio Manzù Centre.

Recipients of Gold Medals include Henry Kissinger, Gro Harlem Brundtland Diana, Princess of Wales, Javier Pérez de Cuéllar, Rita Levi-Montalcini, James Robertson and Daniel Isenberg.

Recipients of the Medal of the President of the Italian Republic include Ivan Eland (2004) Michael Albert (2004), Deepak Chopra, Giuseppe Anedda, and Angélique Kidjo
