= Éditions Alphonse Leduc =

French music publishing house

- Parent company: Wise Music Group
- Founded: 1841; 184 years ago
- Country of origin: France
- Headquarters location: Paris
- Publication types: Sheet music
- Fiction genres: Classical music
- Official website: www.wisemusicclassical.com/wmcparis/

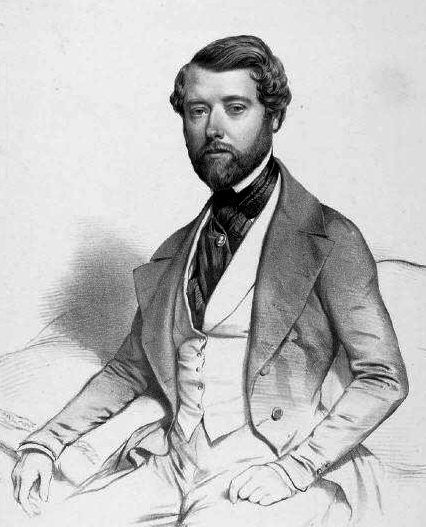
Company founder, Alphonse Leduc (1804–1868)

The Éditions Alphonse Leduc company is a prominent French music publishing house specializing in classical music. It was created in Paris in 1841. Since January 2014, Leduc is part of the Wise Music Group (formerly the Music Sales Group).

== History ==
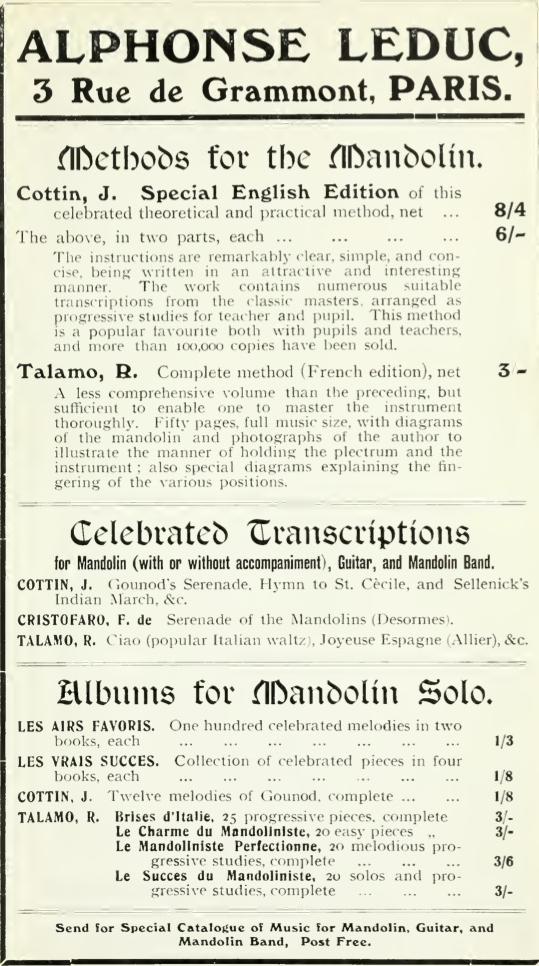
1914 advertisement by Alphonse Leduc of Paris for mandolin music by Jules Cottin, R. Talamo, and Ferdinando de Cristofaro. From Philip J. Bone's book, The Guitar and Mandolin.

Éditions Alphonse Leduc is a family business that has been passed down from father to son over five generations. The family is originally from Arnay-le-Duc, in the Burgundy region of France.

The family musical origins began in Arnay-le-Duc in Burgundy and its first musician, Antoine Girard. Girard was a violinist who left his father's weaving shop to turn his attention to art. His son Charles Girard, who was born in Arnay-le-Duc in 1754, moved to Nantes and was the first full-time musician. The Girards were a large family and its Nantes branch added Leduc to its name, taken from its place of origin Arnay-le-Duc. From then on all of the Girards of this branch were known as Girard-Leduc, and often, for the sake of simplification in business, just Leduc.

=== Alphonse Leduc ===
Alphonse Leduc, teacher, composer, student and flute, guitar and bassoon pupil of Anton Reicha in Paris, was born in Nantes in 1804 and died in Paris in 1868. He transferred his publishing house from Nantes to Paris in 1841. His son, Alphonse-Charles Leduc (Paris 1844-1892), created the important instrumental teaching collections which became the company's specialty and have been constantly expanded ever since. Alphonse-Charles's son, Alphonse Émile Leduc (1878–1951), continued the teaching collections, developed the company's school auditions and published several important symphonic composers. His sons, Claude-Alphonse (1910–1995) and Gilbert Leduc (1911–1985), who entered the business in 1928, managed and further expanded Éditions A. Leduc from 1951 to 1985.

=== Absorbed companies ===
Éditions Alphonse Leduc have absorbed a number of publishing companies during their existence, in recent years B.G., Bornemann, C.Y., Gras, Hamelle, Heugel, Hortensia, King, Notissimo and Ouvrières . They are exclusive agents in France for: Anton J. Benjamin (hire), Carl Fischer Music (hire), Dilia (hire), Joaquín Rodrigo (sales), E.P.T.C. (Editions & Productions Théatrales Chappell) (hire), F.M.T. (hire), Hug, Foetisch, Pelikan (sales), Lido Mélodies (sales), Marine Handler (hire), M.E.L. (Musique en ligne) (hire), Mercury (hire), Misterioso (sales), Moeck (hire), Pan Educational Music (sales), P.W.M. (hire), Schott Musik International (hire), Schirmer, A.M.P. (sales), Sikorski (sales), Sonzogno (hire), Southern Music Co. (sales and hire), Suvini-Zerboni (Sugar Music) (hire), Theodore Presser (sales and hire), Touch of Brass (sales), U.M.P. (sales and hire), Virgo (sales), Warner Chappell Music France (hire), Zen-On (sales and hire).

They are non-exclusive in France for P.W.M. (sales) and Suvini-Zerboni (sales) and non-exclusive worldwide for U.M.P. (sales)(except U.K. and U.S.A.).

Through Diffusion BIM, Alphonse Leduc also distributes internationally the brass music of all publishers worldwide.

Alphonse Leduc and its subsidiary company Heugel have taken control of the well-known American music publishing and distribution company King Music, thus becoming a group of international scope.

==== Heugel ====
The history of the publishing house Heugel dates back to 1839 when Jacques Léopold Heugel became the associate of the music publisher Jean-Antoine Meissonnier. They acquired a periodical, Le Ménestrel, which had been founded in 1833 and was issued until 1940. Their association ended in 1842 when Heugel took over sole control. Léopold Heugel was succeeded on his death in 1883 by his son Henri, since when the company remained in the family until it was bought by Leduc in 1980.

The Heugel catalogue includes all musical genres, both French and international, in particular opera and operetta (Jules Massenet, Ambroise Thomas, Marc-Antoine Charpentier, Édouard Lalo, Léo Delibes, Jacques Offenbach, etc.). Since 1920 Heugel has published much modern music, including that of Reynaldo Hahn, Joseph Canteloube, Francis Poulenc, Darius Milhaud, André Jolivet, and more recently Pierre Boulez, Henri Dutilleux, Betsy Jolas, Gilbert Amy. Le Pupitre, a collection of early music, was started in 1967 under the general editorship of François Lesure; its critical editions are highly respected by musicologists all over the world.

==== Hamelle ====
Hamelle was founded in 1877 by Julien Hamelle who had taken over the catalogue of Maho, a company founded in 1851. Julien Hamelle directed the firm until his death in 1917, when he was succeeded by his son Georges-Edgard. The catalogue, acquired and now distributed by Éditions Leduc, includes an important collection of piano music. Hamelle also published works of Édouard Lalo, Vincent d'Indy, Gabriel Pierné, Camille Saint-Saëns, Charles-Marie Widor, and in particular, those of Gabriel Fauré (Requiem, Élégie, Pavane, as well as the famous Mélodies etc.).

== Present day ==
The fifth generation is represented by François Leduc (Claude's son) and Basile Crichton (the nephew of Claude and Gilbert Leduc), who have been the managers of the company since 1985, assisted by their respective brothers, Jean Leduc and Michel Crichton. François Leduc died on 15 December 2016, at the age of 77 years old.

Alphonse Leduc were acquired by the Music Sales Group in January 2014. The Music Sales Group changed its name to the Wise Music Group in February 2020.

== See also ==
- Éditions Durand, competitor
