= Herbert J. Ellis =

British musician

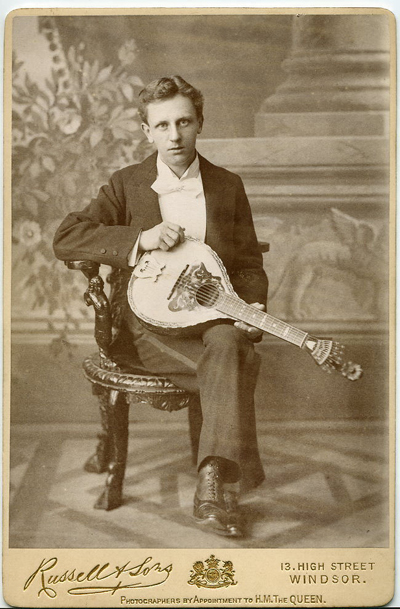
Herbert J. Ellis as a young man, holding a Portuguese guitar.

Herbert J. Ellis (4 July 1865 – 13 October 1903) was a banjo player, a mandolinist, guitar player and a composer. Music historian Philip J. Bone called him "without question the most fertile English composer and arranger for mandolin and guitar." He was the author of a banjo method, a guitar method, and a Tutor for Mandolin (1892), which he wrote while still in school.

Ellis was born in Dulwich, London, the son of a licensed victualler, and received no musical instruction beyond that given by his mother, who had been a pupil of Sir Julius Benedict; she taught her son the piano and harmony. He became the delighted owner of a banjo as a boy and said that, "Having the infatuation (for the banjo), I learnt several tunes out of my piano tutor, and then occurred to me the idea of writing my own music for it. Gradually growing ambitious, I did not rest until I had written an instruction book, which, in due course saw the light and without being egotistical, I think I can safely say that it was from the advent of my Thorough school that the banjo began to be popular."

His parents had planned a business career for him, but after his banjo method was published (by J. A. Turner, London), he was well positioned as an author and composer. He wrote for the banjo during a growing popularity for the instrument in 1884 and onwards. When the mandolin and guitar began to grow popular as well, he added these instruments, about 1888. The demand for his compositions and methods grew and thousands of copies sold, as well as sheet music. His mandolin method was the first printed in England, and, to the general surprise, it ran through several editions. Bone credited it with being the preliminary work that helped to establish the instrument's popularity in England.

His Thorough school for the guitar found favor among teachers and players amidst a guitar revival that followed the banjo and mandolin. Bone said that Ellis's method for the guitar was the simplest and best issued (as of 1914) because of its "unique and simple manner of arrangement, by its explicit diagrams and judicious sequence of studies."

During the period of his first publications, Ellis taught the instruments as well. His career was cut short in his thirties by his premature death. He died in St. Thomas' Hospital, London.

Bone eulogized him and his place in music in England: "To him was given the faculty for expressing himself in the simplest and most attractive manner, and his total avoidance of technical difficulties made his compositions of particular attraction to beginners, and his name quite familiar to all English players of these instruments. Speaking generally, his writings were not advanced in style, but on the other hand his time was fully occupied with the present as a teacher and composer, to allow for the deeper and more solid work, which would in all probability have followed, had his life been spared to more mature years. To Ellis and all English players, the higher branches of the mandolinistic art were unknown, and the majority of guitarists were satisfied with the limitations of an accompaniment; but since his advent, mandolin and guitar instruction books and music have been published in profusion in this country, but his works maintain their popularity."

== Books ==
- Turner's Method for the Mandoline, John Alvey Turner pub., London (1892)
- Thorough School for the Mandoline John Alvey Turner, pub., London (1898)
- High school studies for the mandolin, John Alvey Turner pub., London
- Thorough School for the Guitar
- Dallas Tutor for the Banjo, John Dallas and Sons (1930)
- Tutor for the Five-String Banjo, John Dallas and Sons (1948)
- over one thousand works by Ellis, all published by John Alvey Turner, pub., London
- more works published by Dallas pub., London

== See also ==
- List of mandolinists (sorted)
