= Ugo Orlandi =

Italian musicologist

Ugo Orlandi (born in Brescia, 1958) is a musicologist, a specialist in the history of music, a university professor and internationally renowned mandolinist virtuoso. Among worldwide musicians, professional classical musicians are a small group; among them is an even smaller group of classical mandolinists. Among members of this group, Ugo Orlandi is considered "distinguished." Music historian Paul Sparks called him "a leading figure in the rehabilitation of the eighteenth-century mandolin repertoire, having recorded many concertos from this period."

Orlandi is known to the general public for his collaboration with I Solisti Veneti, directed by Claudio Scimone, with whom he has performed around the world. He is credited on more than 30 albums of mandolin music, many featuring composers from that era.

== Education and academic functions ==
Ugo Orlandi began by studying the mandolin and trumpet, with Giovanni Ligasacchi and Rosa Messora at Centro di Bresciano Giovanile Educazione Music (Music Education Centre of Youth Brescia). From 1975, he studied at the Conservatorio C.Pollini di Padova (Music Conservatory of Padova) directed by mandolinist Giuseppe Anedda, and he also obtained a degree in trumpet.

From 1980 to 2007, he taught mandolin at Conservatorio "C.Pollini 'di Padova and since 2007, provides courses at the Conservatorio Giuseppe Verdi di Milano (Giuseppe Verdi Music Conservatory of Milan).

He has toured the world, going to music festivals, including "Salzburg, Montreux, Edinburgh, 'Mostly Mozart' in New York, and 'The Prestige de la Musique' in Paris."

His former students include internationally known mandolinists Avi Avital and Carlo Aonzo.

== Books ==
Oversaw the publication of the books

- il Periodo d'oro del mandolino for Ed. Turris of Cremona
- Mandolin Memories for Ed. Turris of Cremona
- Il mandolino a Brescia for Ed. Franciacorta
- il volume contenente il lavoro di ricerca sulle sonate per mandolino di Domenico Scarlatti (the volume containing the research work on the sonatas Mandolin by Domenico Scarlatti) for Ed. Berben di Ancona
- il mandolino for Ut Orpheus di Bologna
- 1520 - 1724 Liutai in Brescia, published by Eric Blot Edizioni (2008). Luthiers in Brescia - 1520-1724. Collective work and research carried out for exhibition from June 9, 2007 to July 8, 2007 at"Palazzo Martinengo": Giovanni Paolo Maggini. Centuries of details in Brescia. Published by Marco and Ugo Orlandi Bizzarini, coordinated by Eric Blot, Filippo Fasser and Christopher Reuning. Posted by Marco and Ugo Orlandi Bizzarini. Achieving coordinated by Eric Blot, Filippo Fasser and Christopher Reuning
- Luigi Mozzani - Vita e opere, published by Minerva Edizioni, Bologne, Italy (2011) Luigi Mozzani - The life and work of luthier Luigi Mozzani: mandolin and codification of plectrum instruments.

== Discography ==
- On the Wings of Love, Claudio Scimone, director. Ugo Orlandi, mandolin (on three tracks composed by Antonio Vivaldi in his Lute concerto in D major (Vivaldi): Track 3 - Concerto in Re maggiore RV93 per mandolino e archi: Allegro e giusto, Track 4 - Concerto in Re maggiore RV93 per mandolino e archi: Largo, Track 5 - Concerto in Re maggiore RV93 per mandolino e archi : Allegro).
- Vivaldi, Maestro del Colore Strumentale, Claudio Scimone, director. Ugo Orlandi, liuto soprano (on tracks 11, 12 and 13, composed by Antonio Vivaldi, Concerto for Viola d'amore and Lute in D minor, RV 540)
- Concerti per mandolini, Paisiello - Giuiani - Lecce, Claudio Scimone - director, Ugo Orlandi - mandolin, Dorina Frati - mandolin
- Vivaldi, Concerti per mandolini, Claudio Scimone - director, Ugo Orlandi - mandolin
- Domenico Scarlatti, Sonate per cembalo e mandolino, Sergio Vartolo - cymbals, Ugo Orlandi - mandolin
- Giubileo dell'Anno 2000, Concerto Solenne, Orchestra del Conservatorio "Cesare Pollini" - Padova, Claudio Scimone - director
- L'oi bella va in giardino, COMPAGNIA STRUMENTALE BRESCIANA, GRUPPO PADANO DI PIADENA
- Live in Trieste, Miroslav Miletic, Ugo Orlandi - mandolin
- Pizzichi e Sospiri, Adriano Lincetto, ORCHESTRAL WORKS, Ugo Orlandi - mandolin
- Sonate per Piano Forte e Mandolino, Bertoni - Bortolazzi - Hummel, UGO ORLANDI - mandolin, FRANCO ANGELERI - Piano Forte
- Juditha Triumphans, Antonio Vivaldi, ACADEMIA MONTIS REGALIS, Alessandro De Marchi, Ugo Orlandi mandolino
- Juditha Triumphans, Antonio Vivaldi, Antonio Vivaldi Philharmonic Choir, I Solisti Veneti, Claudio Scimone director
- I Guami da Lucca, Ricercari, canzoni e sonate a 2, 4 e 8 di Francesco e Gioseffo Guami con la battaglia di Annibale Padovano, by the group of cornets e trombones "Paride e Bernardo Dusi", UGO ORLANDI, director
- Ventquattro melodie e altri racconti, Musiche di Adriano Lincetto, UGO ORLANDI, mandolino
- LA GONDOLA, Johann Strauss Jr., Simone Mayr, Gioacchino Rossini, Giovanni Paggi, Antonio Buzzolla, Eduardo Mezzacapo, Franco Faccio, Augusto Rotoli, Alfredo Catalani, Traditional, UGO ORLANDI, mandolin
- Alla ricerca dei suoni perduti, Organ - Harp- Salterio - Guitar - Mandolin, Arte e Musica, UGO ORLANDI, mandolin
- Il barbiere di Siviglia, Giovanni Paisiello Orchestra and chorus of the opera Giuseppe Verdi in Trieste, UGO ORLANDI, mandolin
- Il ballo dei pazzi, Folk dances from printed sources and manuscripts, Compagnia Strumentale Tre Violini, UGO ORLANDI, mandolin
- Italian mandolin concertos, Nicola Conforto, Giovanni Giuliano, Emanuele Barbella, Carlo Cecere, Serafino Cantone, Luigi Lamberti UGO ORLANDI, mandolin, I SOLISTI AQUILANI
- Raffaele Calace - Musica da camera per strumenti a pizzico, "City of Brescia Orchestra of Mandolins and Guitars", Director - Claudio Mandonico, "Raffaele Calace Plectrum Quintet"
- Raffaele Calace - Opere per quartetto e orchestra a plettro, Ugo Orlandi, "City of Brescia Orchestra of Mandolins and Guitars", Director - Claudio Mandonico, "Raeffele Calace Plectrum Quintet"
- Musica per un Momento, "Preludio" Orchestra, "Raffaele Calace Plectrum Quintet", "Paride e Bernardo Dusi Group of Old Instruments", "City of Brescia Orchestra of Mandolins and Guitars"
- Giacomo Sartori - Musica da camera per strumenti a pizzico, Giacomo Sartori (1880 - 1946), Ugo Orlandi, Alessandro Bono,"Raffaele Calace Plectrum Quintet", "City of Brescia Orchestra Plectrum Orchestra", Claudio Mandonico
- Circolo mandolinistico italiano - Brescia, Original chamber and orchestral works for mandolins (XVIII - XX century), Ugo Orlandi, Alessandro Bono, "City of Brescia Orchestra of Mandolins and Guitars", Claudio Mandonico
- Christmas with mandolins, Ugo Orlandi, Alessandro Bono, "Raeffele Calace Plectrum Quintet", "City of Brescia Orchestra of Mandolins and Guitars", Claudio Mandonico
- Claudio Mandonico, Opere scelte, Ugo Orlandi - mandolin, Alessandro Bono - Guitar, Elena Contin - flauto diritto, "Raeffele Calace Plectrum Quintet", "City of Brescia Orchestra of Mandolins and Guitars"
- Mandolin Japan, "Incontro casuale", "A chance meeting", Ugo Orlandi, Alessandro Bono, Claudio Mandonico, "City of Brescia Orchestra Plectrum Orchestra"
- Circolo mandolinistico italiano - Reprint Brescia, "Costantino Quaranta Mandolin Association", Giovanni Ligasacchi, "City of Brescia Orchestra of Mandolins and Guitars", Claudio Mandonico
- The mandolins of Stradivari, Ugo Orlandi - mandolin, Maura Mazzonetto - Pianoforte, Alessandro Bono - Guitar, Giampaolo Baldin - Baritono, "Umberto Sterzati Romantic Mandolin Quartette", "City of Brescia Orchestra of Mandolins and Guitars", Director: Claudio Mandonico
- Spaghetti rag, Rag music with mandolins, Raffaele Calace Plectrum Quintet, Center Boys' Rag Band, The City of Brescia Italian mando-rag club, Ugo Orlandi, Claudio Mandonico
- Simone salvetti (1870 - 1932), Opere scelte, Ugo Orlandi, Luisella Conter, Giacomo Ferrari, Salvetti Quartette, "City of Brescia Orchestra of Mandolins and Guitars"
- Circolo mandolinistico italiano - Voll. III e IV - Bergamo, Ugo Orlandi, Bergamo Student Ensemble, Pietro Ragni, "City of Brescia Orchestra of Mandolins and Guitars", Claudio Mandonico
- Rapsodia napoletana, Ugo Orlandi - mandolin, Maura Mazzonetto - Piano
- Serenata veneziana with mandolins, "Raffaele Calace Plectrum Quintet", "Quadro Raro Ensemble", Ugo Orlandi - mandolin, Alessandro Bono - guitar
