= Jacques Bosch =

Catalan guitarist and song composer

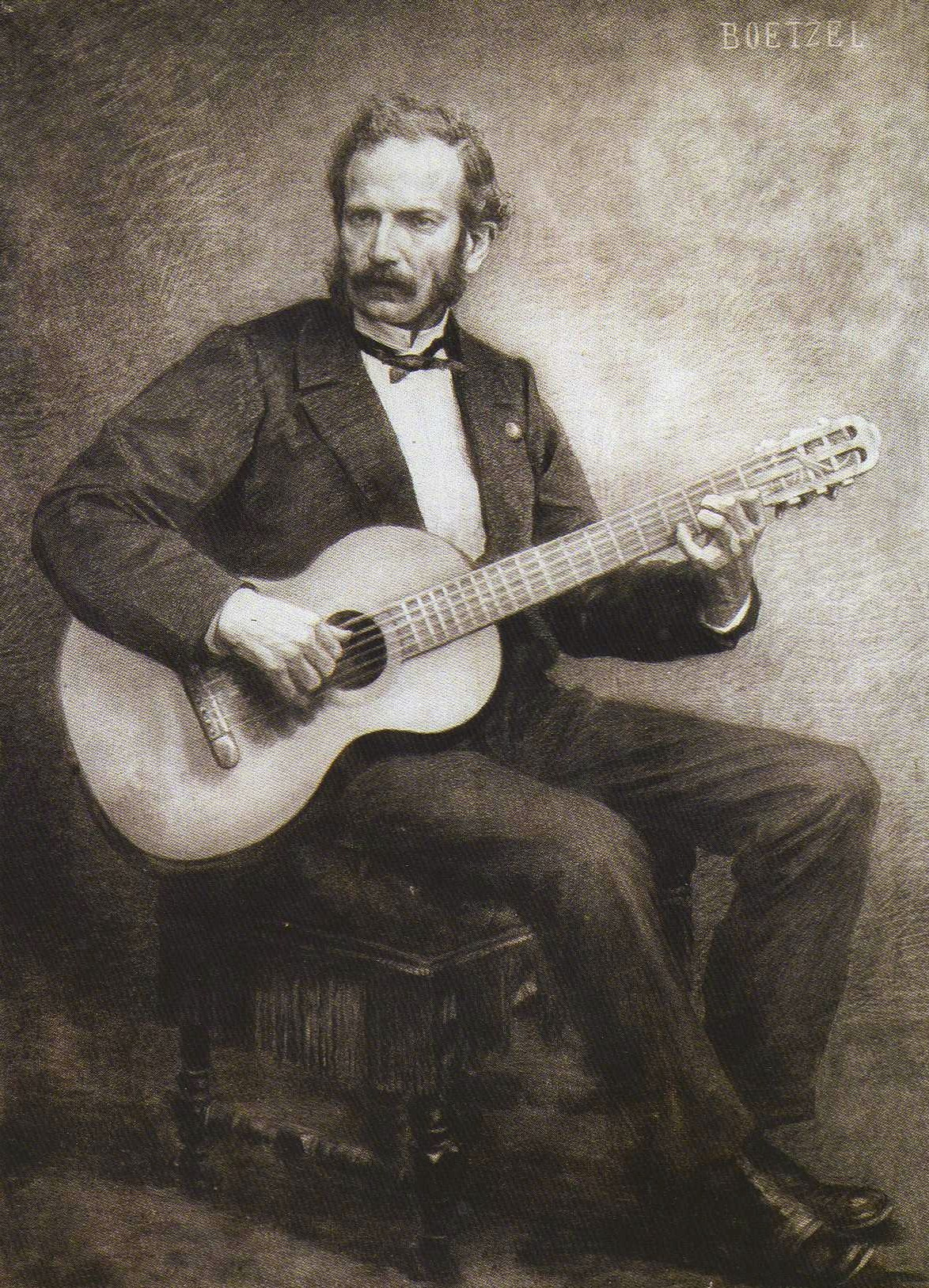
Jacques Bosch, portrait by Ernest Boetzel

Jaime Felipe José Bosch (in Catalan: Jaume Bosch i Renard, in France known as Jacques Bosch) (26 May 1825 – 31 March 1895) was a Catalan guitarist and song composer who established himself in Paris.

== Biography ==
Bosch was born in Barcelona and educated at the school of the Convent de la Mercè in Barcelona, where he began his studies in piano and Guitar.

Before he emigrated, Bosch gave successful concerts in Barcelona, Madrid and Valencia between 1849 and 1852. From 1853 he settled in Paris and from 1857 toured frequently in France, the Netherlands and Germany. Bosch was a very good friend of the painter Édouard Manet and posed for him many times, one portrait being used as illustration for one of Bosch's publications, Plainte Moresque, Op. 85, which is also dedicated to Manet. Besides many original compositions he wrote a Méthode de guitare (1891, see below) and an opera (Roger de Flor, 1868), which was not performed. In Paris, Bosch was much praised at the aristocratic salons and had a large number of pupils, including the brothers Alfred and Jules Cottin. His best-known piece was to be his song collection Dix Mélodies, which was praised by Felipe Pedrell as a "true model of what a composer's inspiration may create in this genre". Bosch died in the 17th arrondissement of Paris.

Most of Bosch's guitar works were not published at the time they were written but in collections of Dix Pièces (ten pieces) in 1887 and 1894, 12 Pièces faciles (12 easy pieces) in 1892 and a further six easy pieces in 1894. A later edition of ten easy pieces (1923) reprints some previously published pieces together with seven pieces that had apparently not previously been published.

Bosch's Méthode de guitare is very much a composer's method insofar as it contains numerous original compositions of varying length and difficulty. In the course of its 116 pages there are 16 Leçons (distributed over pages 3–14), 31 Exercises (pages 22–92) and 39 original compositions, ranging in length from one to five pages. Most of them are dedicated to one of his pupils, who included Guy de Polignac, member of a famous French noble family. Among the more substantial works there are two movements of a Sonata dialogue, dedicated to the memory of Fernando Sor (an Adagio on pp. 63–4, and an Allegro on pp. 102–4), a Jota (pp. 69–72), and Iberia (subtitled Valse de concert), pp. 110–4 (see below for full listing).

== Selected compositions ==
Guitar solo

- Duettino, Op. 10 (published in Dix Pièces pour guitare, no. 1, Paris: H. Lemoine, 1887)
- Brimborion, Op. 11 (in Dix Pièces pour guitare, no. 5, Paris: H. Lemoine, 1887)
- Étoiles et fleurs, Op. 12 (in Dix Pièces pour guitare, no. 2, Paris: H. Lemoine, 1887)
- Celia. Jota-valse, Op. 13 (in Dix Pièces pour guitare, no. 3, Paris: H. Lemoine, 1887)
- Fantaisie dramatique sur un opéra de l'auteur, Op. 14 (in Dix Pièces pour guitare, no. 4, Paris: H. Lemoine, 1887)
- Souvenir de Barcelone, Op. 15 (in Dix Pièces pour guitare, no. 6, Paris: H. Lemoine, 1887)
- Retraite espagnole, Op. 16 (in Dix Pièces pour guitare, no. 7, Paris: H. Lemoine, 1887)
- Allegro de sonate, Op. 17 (in Dix Pièces pour guitare, no. 10, Paris: H. Lemoine, 1887)
- Méditation, Op. 18 (in Dix Pièces pour guitare, no. 8, Paris: H. Lemoine, 1887)
- Ballade, Op. 19 (in Dix Pièces pour guitare, no. 9, Paris: H. Lemoine, 1887)

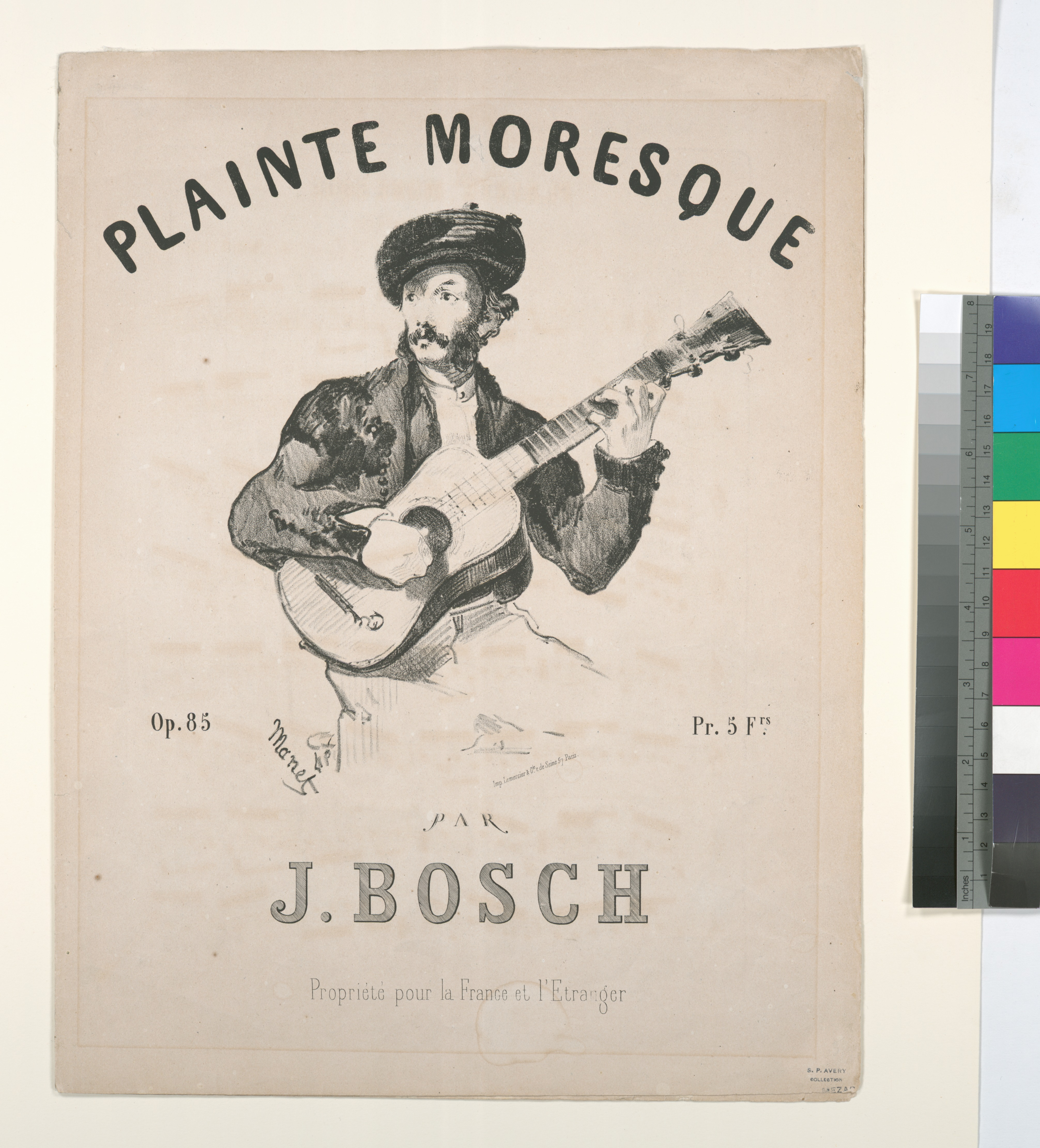
Cover of Plainte moresque, Op. 85

- Plainte Moresque, Op. 85 (Paris: [s.n.], 1866, again 1883)
- Pasa calle. Sérénade, Op. 86 (Paris: H. Lemoine, 1885)
- 12 Pièces faciles (Paris: Veuve Girod, 1892). Contains: 1. Habanera; 2. Valse échantillon; 3. Récit sans paroles; 4. Romance; 5. Banjo; 6. Scherzo-valse; 7. Anda salero; 8. Mélancolie; 9. Barcarolle; 10. Hymne national russe; 11. Espoir; 12. Tango danse des nègres.
- La Rose. Valse, Op. 88, with mandolin ad lib. (Paris: H. Lemoine, 1893)
- Six Pièces faciles, Op. 89 (itself published as part of a second series of Dix Pièces, Paris: H. Lemoine, 1894; in this series they are nos. 5 to 10). Contains: 1. Enfantillage; 2. 1er Guagirana; 3. 2e Guagirana; 4. Les Adieux; 5. Lamento; 6. Gitanilla.
- L'Amazone. Polka, Op. 90 (published in Dix Pièces pour guitar, second series, no. 1, Paris: H. Lemoine, 1894)
- Au sons des cloches, Op. 91 (in Dix Pièces pour guitar, second series, no. 2, Paris: H. Lemoine, 1894)
- Venise, Op. 92 (in Dix Pièces pour guitar, second series, no. 3, Paris: H. Lemoine, 1894)
- Les Echos, Op. 93 (in Dix Pièces pour guitar, second series, no. 4, Paris: H. Lemoine, 1894)
- Cello (Paris: H. Lemoine, 1896)
- Dix Pièces faciles pour l'étude de la guitare (Paris: Alphonse Leduc, 1923). Contains the following works without dates or opus numbers: 1. Habanera; 2. Cantilena; 3. Romancero; 4. Banjo; 5. Nineria; 6. Anda salero; 7. Soledad; 8. Venecia; 9. Sueño; 10. Tango flamenco.

Guitar duo

- La Catalane (Paris: Léon Grus, 1898) – score online at BnF

Guitar method

- Méthode de guitare (Paris: Veuve E. Girod, 1891). Contains the following 39 original compositions: 1re Récréation (Petit danse espagnole); 2me Récréation (Solear); 3me Récréation (Imité de Schumann); 4me Récréation (Minuetto); 5e Récréation (Rêverie); Petite romance; Air varié; Boleras; Rêverie; Matine; Fantaisie de salon; Scherzo (= 12e Exercise); La Gaditana; Seguidillas gitanas de Grenade; Tita (Havanaise); Divertissement; Après la chasse (Rêverie); Les Etincelles; Fantaisie caprice; Zapateado; Fantaisie espagnole; Feuilles et Zéphirs; Joie matinale; Alma viva; Boléro rêverie; Sonate dialogue (Adagio); Morceau brillant (Vieille manière); Variation; Finale (Tremolo étude); Jota; Alla Mendelssohn; Barbéro; Valse espagnole; Rêverie (duo); Valse (duo); Colorado (Valse brillante); Jaleo; Petite marche funèbre; Sonate dialogue (Allegro); Iberia (Valse de concert).

Songs for voice and guitar

- Dix Mélodies (Georges Montière) (Paris: [s.n.], 1892). Contains: Chanson maure, Clochettes, Crépuscule d'automne, Rondeau, La Femme du chef, Aubade, À l'aimée, À Seville, Fleurs d'antan, Retraite chantée.
- Charmant ruisseau (Stephan Bordèse), accompaniment by violin and guitar (Paris: Veuve E. Girod, 1890)

Songs for voice and piano

- Rêvez toujours. Mélodie (no text author named, published in La Tribune musicale, 1 September 1861)
- Tout dort. Sérénade (text by "E. F.") (Paris: E. Girod, 1862)
- Sous mes blanches voiles. Barcarolle (Comtesse Jules de C.) (Paris: A. O'Kelly, 1876)

Chamber music

- Boléro, for two mandolins and guitar (Paris: H. Lemoine, 1893)
- Jaleo. Danse andalouse, for mandolin and guitar (Paris: H. Lemoine, 1895)
- Zapateado. Valse, for mandolin and guitar (Paris: H. Lemoine, 1896)
- Chant divin. Hymne, for cello and piano (Paris: G. Gross, 1907)

== Recordings ==
- Música para canto y guitarra del siglo XIX. Francisco Heredia (tenor), Javier Chamizo (guitar). Fonoruz CO 505 (CD, 1997). Contains four of the 10 Mélodies: Rondeau, Aubade, À l'aimée, À Seville.
- Bosch: Obres per a Veu i Guitarra. Maria Teresa Garrigosa (soprano), Miguel Javaloy (guitar). La Mà de Guido LMG 2098 (CD, 2011). Contains: 10 Mélodies pour guitare et chant, Passacaille, Brimborion, Op. 11, Étoiles et fleurs, Op. 12, Fantaisie dramatique sur un opéra de l'auteur, Op. 14, Retraite espagnole, Op. 16, Méditation, Op. 18, Ballade, Op. 19, Plainte moresque. Mélodie pour la guitare, Op. 85, Cello, Op. posth.
- Souvenir de Barcelone. Miguel Javaloy (guitar). La Mà de Guido LMG 2119 (CD, 2012). Contains: Souvenir de Barcelone, Op. 15, Au sons des cloches, Op. 91, Venise, Op. 92.
