= Giuseppe Bellenghi =

Italian composer

Giuseppe Bellenghi.

Giuseppe Bellenghi (1847 in Bologna – 17 October 1902 in Florence) was a virtuoso violoncellist and mandolinist, and composer. He was remembered in 1914 as "a devoted champion of the mandolin."

Bellinghi studied violoncello under "several well-known Italian masters," including Teodulo and Jefte Sbolci. He gained a reputation as a cello virtuoso in Florence, and worked in important concerts in Bologna and Florence, and as first violoncellist in the theatres. He taught the violoncello as well, and cellist Elvira Paoli was one of his students.

While teaching violoncello, Bellenghi "became enamored of the mandolin," which was in fashion at the time with the aristocracy and nobility in Italy. He worked to spread its popularity further. He began to perform in concerts as a mandolinist between 1880 and 1900. Bellenghi organized concerts in Florence and Bologna, where "celebrated mandolinists, Riccardo Rovinazzi, Giuseppe Silvestri, and Caroline Grimaldi took part." He was also one of three teachers to be given the privilege of teaching the mandolin to Princess Margherita of the Royal family of Italy; Belisario Mattera and Constantino Bertucci also received that honor.

He began to write for the mandolin, creating "light selections." He first published with Ricordi in Milan, but later founded Forlivesi & Company Publishing in Florence, which was a major music publisher when he died in 1902, publishing more than 7000 musical compositions.

Bellenghi's own compositions were very numerous, and he published many lighter works under the name of G. B. Pirani. He wrote the comprehensive Method for the mandolin in three parts, which is published in four languages, French, English, Italian and German. He also wrote a series of daily exercises for the mandolin, entitled La ginnastica del mandolino, with the object of strengthening the fourth finger, and a volume of Ascending and descending major and minor scales in all positions for the mandolin. He wrote Six duos for two mandolins and a Theoretical treatise on the rudiments of music.

In addition to his mandolin books, Bellenghi was the first to write and publish a method for the modern lute, and under the name G. B. Pirani, methods for mandola and guitar.

The most popular of his compositions were the waltzes Profumi Orientali and Renato, both of which rapidly passed many editions. When it was published, Renato was "the foremost composition for mandolin band". Profumi Orientali was also arranged by its author as a song with French, Italian, and English words.

Bellenghi wrote many pieces for piano solo and two pianos, songs with piano or guitar accompaniments, and about seventy various arrangements and original compositions for mandolin band. He also wrote about fifty similar works for guitar solo.

He wrote a set of Variations for the mandolin with accompaniment of piano or guitar—variations of Paganini's variations on the Carnival of Venice. Biographer Philp J. Bone said that "this work alone, places Bellenghi in the foremost rank as a mandolin virtuoso and thorough artist on the instrument, who enlarged its scope and extended its musical possibilities, as nothing of so advanced a nature for the mandolin had been published hitherto."

Bellinghi died when he was 55. His music publishing business was continued by his son, Renato Bellenghi.

== See also ==
- List of mandolinists (sorted)
