= Matteo Casserino =

Italian-American musician and composer (1913-2001)

- Born: March 8, 1913; Pozzallo, Sicily
- Died: November 29, 2001 (aged 88) San Rafael, California
- Genres: Ballo liscio; Opera
- Occupations: Musician, composer
- Instrument: Mandolin
- Years active: c. 1920s–2001
- Label: Oakways Records

Matteo Casserino was an Italian American mandolinist and composer.

Born in the province of Ragusa in 1913, he worked for several years in the Italian Merchant Marine before emigrating to the United States in 1936, settling in New York City at age 23. He moved to San Francisco with his wife Viola in 1943 and found work as a cabinet maker and joined the Carpenter's Union. After retiring in 1973, he focused on his musical pursuits as a mandolinist and played weekly at the Caffe Trieste in the North Beach neighborhood. He moved to San Rafael, CA in 1990.
