= I Solisti Veneti =

Italian chamber orchestra

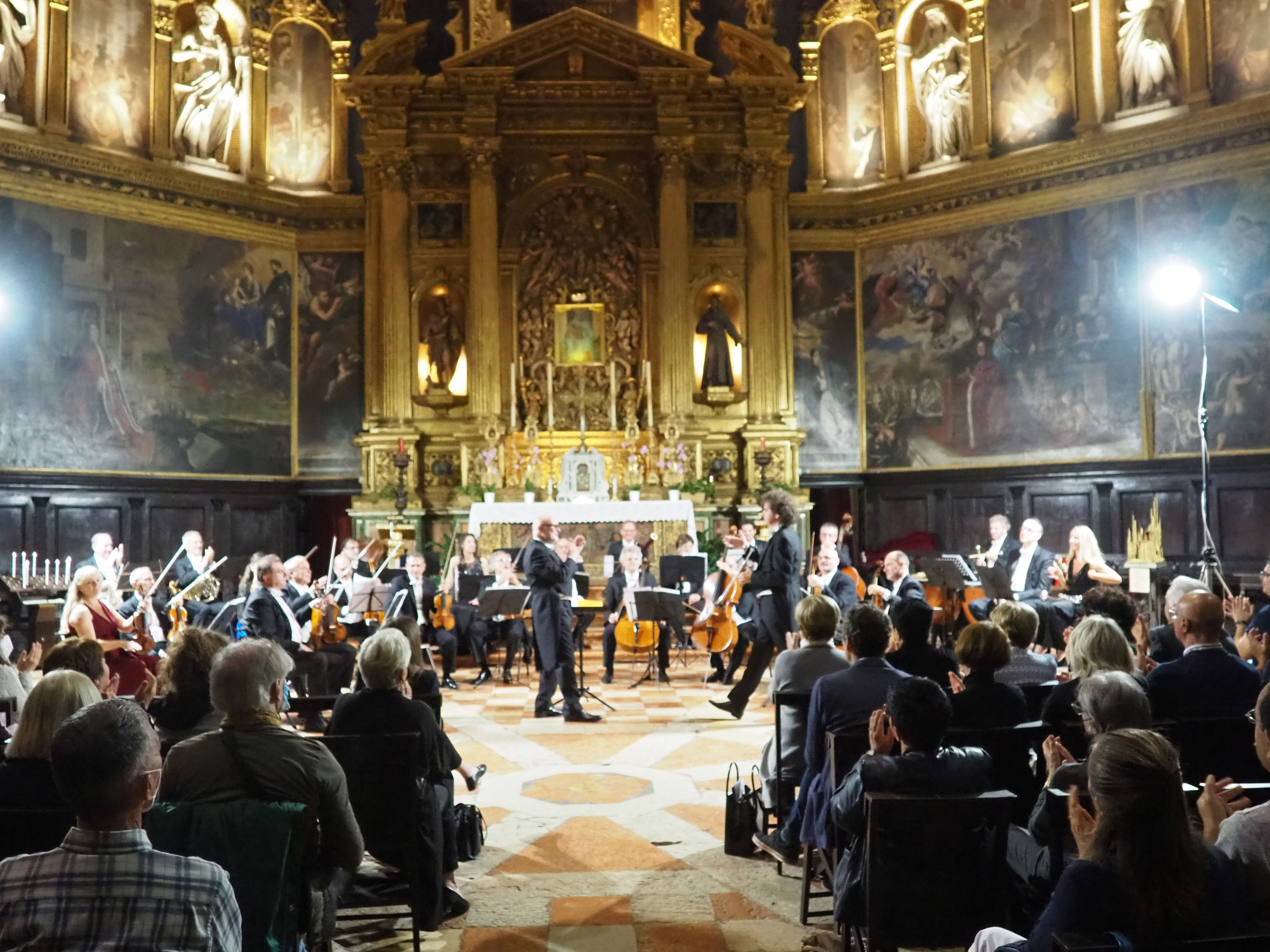
Rovigo, chiesa della Beata Vergine del Soccorso, named La Rotonda, 27 september 2022: Giuliano Carella conducted the orchestra I Solisti Veneti in La tromba, regina degli ottoni (The trumpet, queen of the brass).

I Solisti Veneti is an Italian chamber orchestra founded in Padua in 1959 by Claudio Scimone. Since 2019, the Musical Director has been Giuliano Carella, and since 2020 he has also been Artistic Director.

== Background ==
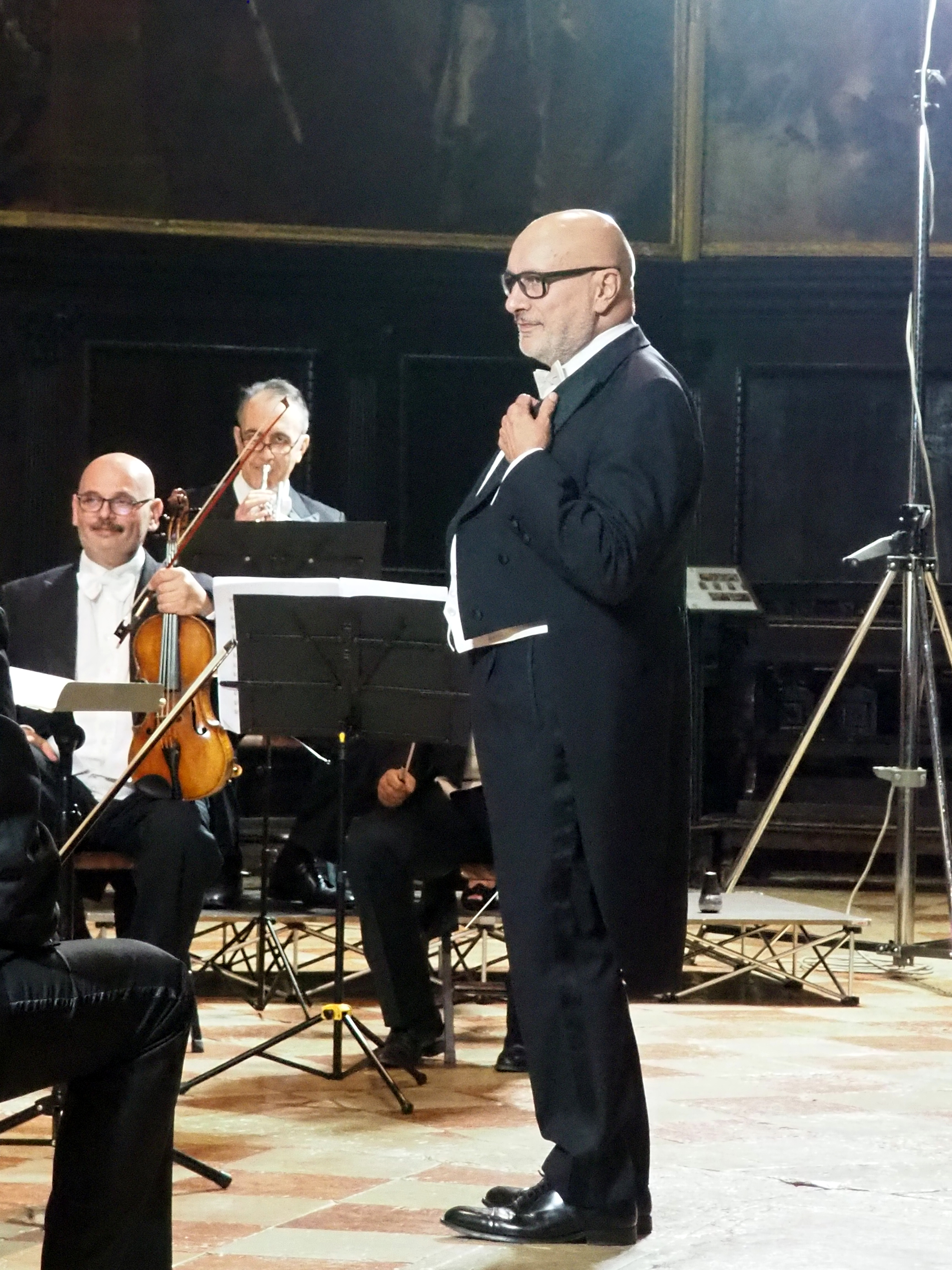
Giuliano Carella, orchestra and artistic director.

The ensemble was directed by Scimone until his last concert on 2 September 2018; he died on 6 September. I Solisti Veneti made a reputation especially with Italian Baroque music, recording many works by Antonio Vivaldi, Tomaso Albinoni, Francesco Geminiani, Benedetto Marcello and Giuseppe Tartini.

I Solisti Veneti has toured the world, playing over 6,000 concerts in over ninety countries, in places as diverse as Salzburg and Seoul.

As part of its 50th anniversary celebrations in 2008 the European Parliament honoured the Orchestra with an official plaque where they are praised as “Ambassadors of culture and music across the borders”. In April 2018 they gave a concert at the Embassy of Italy, Washington, DC.

== Collaborations ==
The ensemble has recorded with many world-famous artists, including Salvatore Accardo, Plácido Domingo, Jean-Pierre Rampal, Marilyn Horne, James Galway, Mstislav Rostropovich, Sviatoslav Richter, Paul Badura-Skoda, Heinz Holliger and Ugo Orlandi.

== Recordings ==
The group has made over 350 recordings, many on the Erato record label, others on RCA, Sony, Arts, etc. A number of these were first-ever recordings of works of Vivaldi, Albinoni and Rossini. However the repertoire of the orchestra is very wide and extends from 1585 (Giovanni Bassano) up to many works written in 2017. More than 70 composers of our times have dedicated works for Claudio Scimone and his Orchestra such as Bussotti, Donatoni, R.Malipiero, L.Chailly, Guaccero, Morricone, Constant, De Pablo, De Marzi, Cadario, Campogrande, Lucio Dalla, Donaggio and many women composers.

I Solisti Veneti has recorded for television and movies. The ensemble has won numerous awards including a Grammy (Los Angeles, 1980), three 'Grand Prix du Disque.' (Académie Charles Cros and Acadèmie du Disque Lyrique). They won the first prize in the original countest of Festivalbar 1970 (juke box recordings) with 350,000 votes of young listeners.
