= Jean Pietrapertosa =

Italian composer

Jean Pietrapertosa, 1892, from his book Methode de mandolin

Jean Pietrapertosa (1855–1940) was a composer and virtuoso of the mandolin who performed in Paris in the 1880s. He taught the mandolin and wrote a two-volume mandolin method book, Méthode de mandolin, published in Paris in 1892. He also organized a mandolin orchestra.

== Name confusion ==
There is confusion about the identity of some works by Pietrapertosa. There are works by "J. Pietrapertosa" that may not have been Jean's but Janvier's. It has not been cleared up as to whether these are two different men or if "Janvier Pietrapertosa Fils" is a different person, possibly his son.

== Works ==
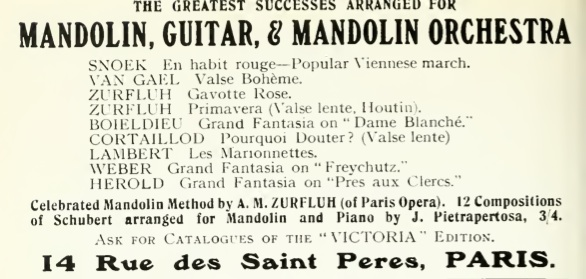
Advertisement from 1914 for sheet music, including Pietrapertosa's mandolin and piano arrangements of 12 Compositions of Schubert.

=== Books ===
- Methode complete de mandoline ou banjoline
- Methode de mandoline

=== Compositions ===
- Ada-berceuse / transcription par Giuseppe Bellenghi; J. Pietrapertosa (Firenze : A. Forlivesi e C., dep.1889)
- Au bord du Gange de Felix Mendelssohn: transcription pour mandoline (ou violon) et piano : Op. 87 (Paris : G. Ricordi & C 1893)
- Deux transcription pour mandoline et piano (London: Schott)
- Frais minois, Op.217
- Gavotte Stephanie Op. 120, transcription del Alphons Czibulka; transcription pour Mandoline et Piano (Brussels: Schott Frères, 1889) Dedicated to Eduardo Mezzacapo.
- Jolis yeux noirs: valse pour Mandoline et Piano. Op.100 (Paris : G. Ricordi & C., 1894)
- La Berceuse à grand'mère: pour Mandoline et Piano Op. 102. (Paris: G. Ricordi & C., 1894)
- Le Pays des chimères: bluette pour Mandoline et Piano, Op. 104. (Paris : G. Ricordi & C.,1894)
- Marche des mandolinistes : pour mandoline et piano avec 2.me mandoline ad libitum, op. 105 (Milan: G. Ricordi, c.1894)
- Méditation de Thaïs: Comédie lyrique de Jules Massenet Transcription pour Mandoline et Piano (Paris: Au Ménestrel Henry Heugel & C., 1894 and 1898). Dedicated to Chevalier.
- Menuet: du 3.e Acte ¢du! Falstaff de Giuseppe Verdi pour mandoline et Piano Op. 109 (Milan : G. Ricordi & C. 1894)
- Musique pour Mandoline: Transcriptions pour Mandoline et Piano (Brussels: Schott Frères, 1889)
- Ninon: petit menuet pour Mandoline et Piano Op. 101. (Paris : G. Ricordi & C., t.s.1894)
- Rhapsodie pour mandoline et piano : Op. 50 (Paris : G. Ricordi & C., 1892)
- Scherzettino pour mandoline et piano : Op. 74 (Paris: G. Ricordi & C. 1894)
- Sérénade andalouse : pour mandoline et piano : Op. 49 (Paris: G. Ricordi & C.,.1892) Has dedication "À Monsieur le Commandeur Jules Ricordi."
- Souvenir de la Havane: pour Mandoline (ou Violon) et Piano Op. 75 (Milan: G. Ricordi & C., 1896) Has dedication "À sa belle-mère Madame Rosenberg".
- Souvenir et Mélancolie: arioso pour Mandoline (ou Violon) et Piano, Op. 103. (Paris : G. Ricordi & C., 1894)
