= Pietro Armanini =

Italian composer

Pietro Armanini

Pietro Armanini was an Italian mandolin virtuoso who was born in 1844 and died on 8 September 1895 in Bordeaux, France. As a professor at La Scala, he was one of the most famous exponents of the Milanese mandolin and the first to bring his instrument professionally before the English public.

One of his life's ambitions was to make the mandolin popular, and he made continental music tours for that purpose. His last performance was in London in 1895. Armanini's success in England was mixed; the journals of the time stated that his cadenzas and improvisations were little short of marvellous. However, it also called him a "maestro of the very highest order"—"an artist without an equal as an executant, he had no rival, and probably will have no successor, his scale passages, part playing, pizzicato, double stopping with left hand, and marvellous rapidity proclaimed him the Paganini of the mandolin."

In 1895 he retired from public life and lived at Bordeaux. He was stricken by an illness that same year and never recovered.

== Legacy ==
Armanini was the author of an excellent treatise on the Milanese mandolin, and his sons and daughters were also excellent performers, one being a professor of the mandolin at the Academic International de Musique, Paris.

- La cigale polka pour (The Grasshopper Polka) for piano
- L'éventail polka-mazurka (The Range Mazurka) for piano
- Méthode de mandoline lombarde (Method for the Lombard Mandolin), 1st part

== See also ==
- List of mandolinists (sorted)
