= Alexandro Marie Antoin Fridzeri =

Italian composer

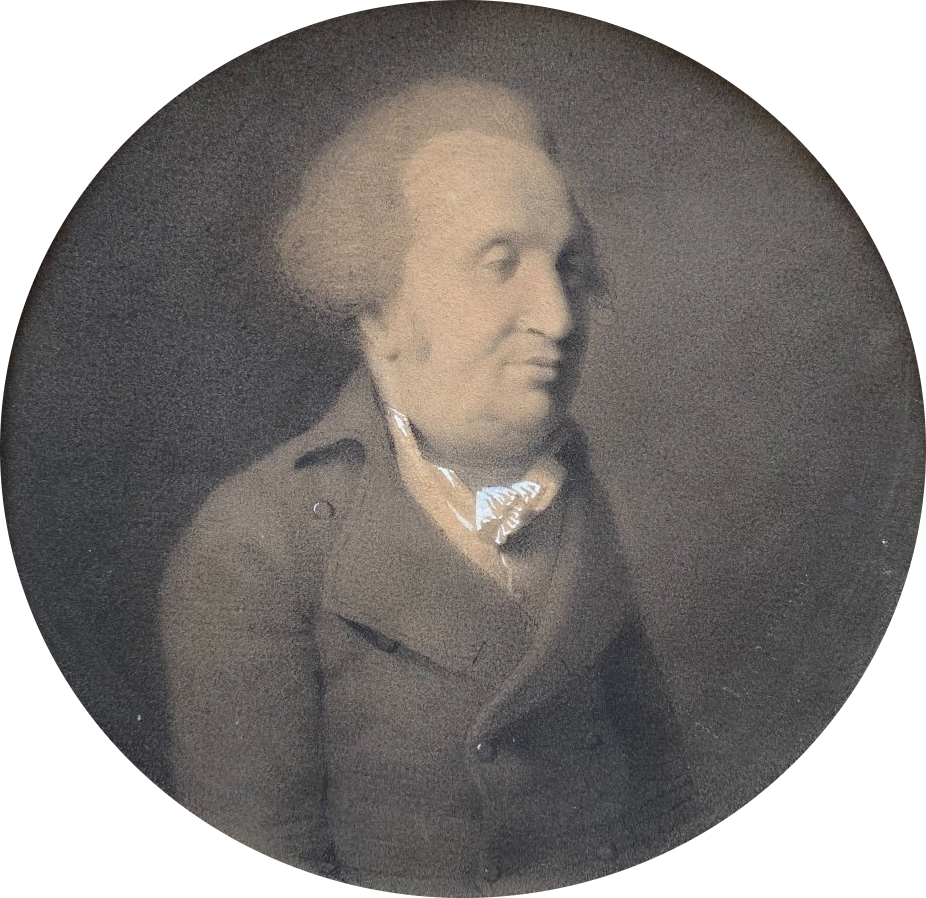
Portrait of Fridzeri by Alexandre Vigneux, circa 1799

Alexandro Marie Antoin Fridzeri or Frixer (born Verona 16 January 1741, died Antwerp 1825) was the most renowned of mandolin virtuosi, a clever violinist, organist, and a composer whose works met with popular favor. Among his works were sonatas and chamber music and operas. His life began and ended with tragic notes, losing his eyesight and later his home and possessions. Music historian Philip J. Bone called Fridzeri " an artist of undoubted genius and a man of most remarkable character, which was fully tried under great adversity." The late Giuseppe Bellenghi, mandolinist and composer, dedicated his variations for mandolin and piano on the Carnival of Venice, to the memory of Fridzeri, the blind mandolin player and composer.

== Blind boy ==
Fridzeri lost his eyesight in a childhood accident but the loss of this sense quickened and intensified others. He was taken with music at an early age and was taught singing and the elements of music while a child. However, apart from this first elementary instruction Fridzeri was self-taught in all the branches of the art, both practical and theoretical. He had learned to play the mandolin by age 11 and constructed his own instrument. He mastered the mandolin enough by that point to be engaged as singing boy at the fashionable serenades, which were customary and exceedingly popular among the nobility of Italy, accompanying himself with his mandolin. Fidzeri is said to have had a good voice and his stage presence—a blind boy singing romances, accompanied by his mandolin—was a pleasure to these select assemblies.

== Traveling musician ==
Fridzeri also devoted himself to the study of other musical instruments and excelled in his performances upon the violin, flute, viol d'amour and organ. When he reached twenty years of age, he was appointed organist of the cathedral of the Madonna del Monte Berico, Vicenza, and he moved there from Verona with his parents to take up this position. For the space of about three years, he remained as organist of this celebrated cathedral, and then commenced an exceedingly romantic and checkered career. At the age of twenty-four, he left home with a companion and toured Europe as a blind mandolin virtuoso. His repertoire consisted of the concertos of Tartini, the principal works of Pugnani and Ferrari, and several of his own compositions. They travelled through the north of Italy and central France, ultimately reaching Paris, towards the close of the same year (c. 1762).

Fridzeri met with success and received great applause wherever he performed during his travels. However, in Paris he was not encouraged by his reception; the mandolin was not as popular as in Italy, and he turned to the violin. He appeared as violin soloist at the famous Concerts Spirituels and performed with brilliant success a concerto of Pierre Gaviniès and his own two concertos for violin, Op. 5. Then he took up residence in Paris for two years, teaching the mandolin and violin, after which, he made a long concert tour through the north of France, Belgium and the Rhineland of Germany. Fridzeri found popularity in Strasburg and he resided there for twelve months, writing his first two operas, which were produced at the Comedie Italienne in Paris when he returned to France.

== Settling and composing ==
He returned to Paris by 1771, engaged in writing incidental music for the Parisian theaters and also numerous string quartets and mandolin sonatas. Towards the end of that year, he left Paris again, this time for Brittany, where he had been appointed private musician to the Count Châteaugiron, and with whom he remained for twelve years. During this time, he applied himself in his leisure principally to operatic composition, and undertook periodical visits to Paris to superintend the production of his new stage works. Finding a demand for this class of composition, he terminated his service as private musician to Count Chateaugiron and again took up his residence in Paris. Then the French Revolution began in 1789, and he fled to Nantes, where he established an academy of music and was once more employed in teaching.

== French civil war ==
For five years the blind musician was thus actively engaged in Nantes until the terrors of the civil war in Vendée and there was wholesale massacre Nantes too. He fled back to Paris for refuge. On his return he was elected a member of the "Lycee de Arts," 1794, and commenced a music printing business in the Rue Saint Nicaise, near the Palais-Royal. Although his business quickly failed, he did published his opera, Les souliers mordores there. In spite of that, it was the beginning of ill fortune, for in December 1801 a bomb was hurled at the Palaise Royal and its explosion totally destroyed all Fridzeri's possessions. He wasn't alone; the unsettled state of fifteen thousand persons perished in one month. The French government of this year compelled the blind musician, now sixty years of age and reduced to poverty, to leave France. He began to wander again, with his two daughters — both musicians. With them, the elder a violinist and the younger vocalist, they travelled through Belgium and settled in Antwerp where the daughters followed the vocation of their father and established a music and musical instrument business. The business continued until the death of Fridzeri.

== Works ==
His opera, Les deux miliciens (The two soldiers), established his reputation as a musician and writer of music which was at once melodious and brilliant, and his published works, though not numerous, embrace nearly every variety of musical composition. The following are the principal:

- Six quartets for two violins, alto and bass, Op. 1, published 1771, in Paris
- a second book of Six quartets published later
- Les deux miliciens (The two soldiers), Op. 2, a comic opera in one act which was produced successfully in 1772
- Six sonatas for the mandolin, Op. 3, published 1771, Paris
- Les souliers mordores (The brown shoes), Op. 4, a comic opera in two acts produced 1776 at Comedie Italienne
- Two concertos for the violin, Op. 5, played by the composer at the Concerts Spirituels, Paris
- Six romances for voice with harp accompaniment, Op. 6
- Four duos for two violins, Op. 7, published 1795, Paris
- Lucette, an opera produced in 1785
- Les Thermopyles, Op. 8, a grand opera — an edition of this work was arranged by the composer for piano solo
- Collection of songs with piano accompaniment, Op. 9
- Symphony concertante for two violins, alto and grand orchestra, and many other pieces for the mandolin.
