= Giuseppe Silvestri =

Italian composer

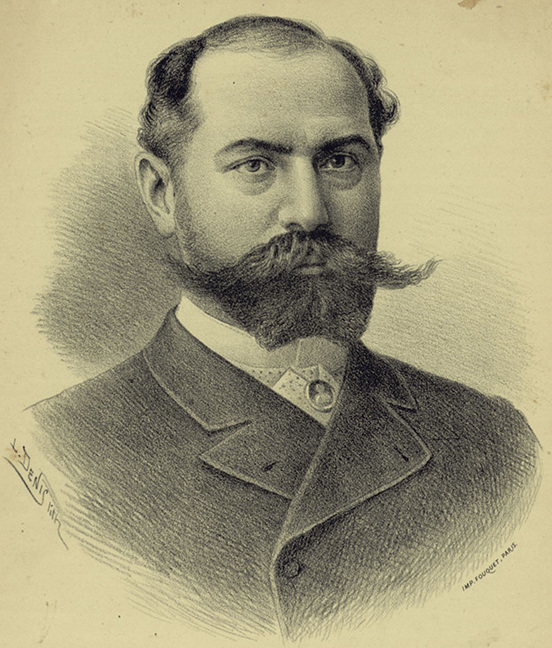
Portrait of Giuseppe Silvestri by L. Denis

Giuseppe Silvestri (1841-1921) was an Italian classical composer and mandolin virtuoso. He is principally remembered today for his role as a mandolinist and for his composition Serenade d'Autrefois (Serenata medioevale or Serenade of Olden Times). He was a celebrated teacher of the mandolin in Naples and Paris, and he became popular enough to get the criticism that he was causing Parisians to leave the piano for the mandolin.

His fame spread after the Paris Exhibition of 1878, in which he performed to enthusiastic crowds and reviews. One review said that he made the mandolin produce sounds that resembled those made with the violin, and in other hands the instrument sounded "meagre".

== Compositions ==
Seven of Silvestri's compositions were recorded on Victor Records

- Serenata Silvestri (performed by Neapolitan Trio)
- Elvira (performed by Orchestrina Napoletana)
- Le violette (performed by Orchestrina Napoletana)
- Patria mia (performed by Orchestrina Napoletana)
- Serenata medioevale (performed by tenor, Tito Schipa, with flute and orchestra)
- Sérénade d'autrefois (performed by tenor Tito Schipa, with orchestra)
- Il portavoce valzer (performed by Italian String Trio)

== See also ==
- List of mandolinists (sorted)
