= Arling Shaeffer =

Musician

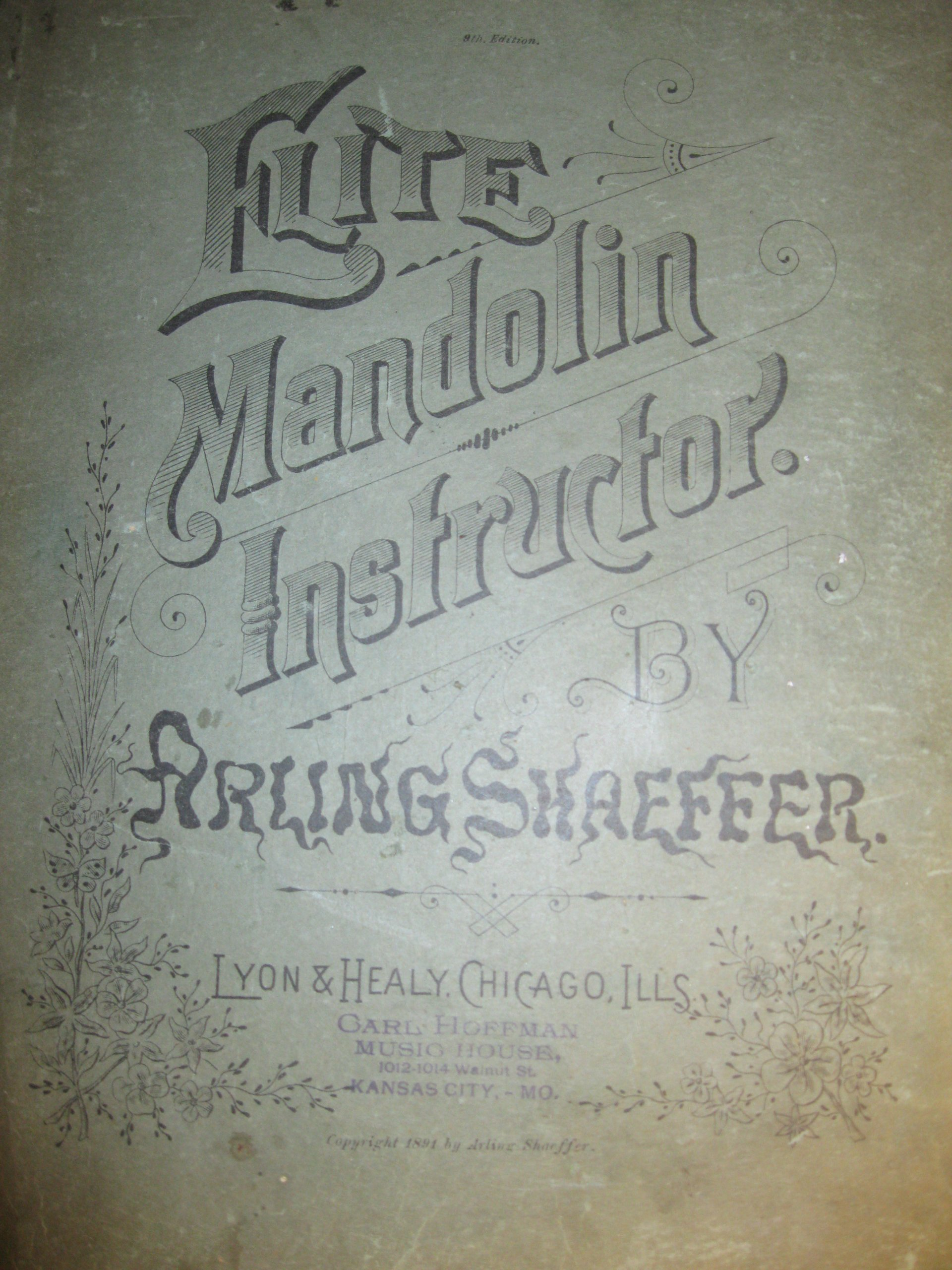
The book Elite Mandolin Instructor by Arling Shaeffer, published by Lyon and Healy, Chicago, 1891.

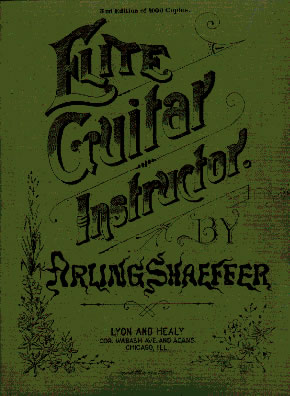
The book Elite Guitar Instructor by Arling Shaeffer, published by Lyon and Healy, Chicago, 1895.

Arling Shaeffer (1859 – February 21, 1943) was an American composer and arranger.

Shaeffer was born in Fond du Lac, Wisconsin in 1859. He was also a musician known for his mastery of fretted instruments such as the guitar, mandolin, ukulele, and banjo. He wrote a mandolin method book, Elite Mandolin Instructor, published by Lyon and Healy in 1891, and a guitar method book, the Elite Guitar Instructor, published in 1895.

Shaeffer died in Marinette, Wisconsin on February 21, 1943 and was buried in Fond du Lac.

== Works ==
=== Books ===
- Arling Shaeffer's Barn Dance: World's Greatest Collection of Quadrilles, Jigs, Reels, and Hornpipes with All Calls (1933)
- The Washburn Mandolin Method (1898)
- Elite Mandolin Instructor (1891)
- Elite Guitar Instructor (1896)
- The Ideal Harp Instructor (1894)
- Elite Collection for Guitar: A Volume of Charming Instrumental Solos
- The Elite Method for the Ukulele: New System (1919)
