= Kurt Jensen (musician) =

Danish-Australian musician (1913–2011)

Kurt Jensen (26 March 1913 – 2 January 2011) was a Danish-Australian mandolin virtuoso. From age 12 he studied with the mandolin maestro Alberto Bracony, and participated in one of the first Danish radio broadcasts with Bracony's orchestra in 1925. As a guitarist and violinist he played both in Jazz ensembles and symphonic orchestras, but maintained the mandolin as his main instrument. As a teacher he taught many students of both guitar and violin. In the 1980s he performed in the Danish Mandolin Duo with his former pupil Tove Flensborg and toured widely in Europe and beyond. In 1989 he emigrated to Australia where he lived until his death at 97 in 2011.
