= Giuseppe Anedda =

Italian mandolin virtuoso (1912–1997)

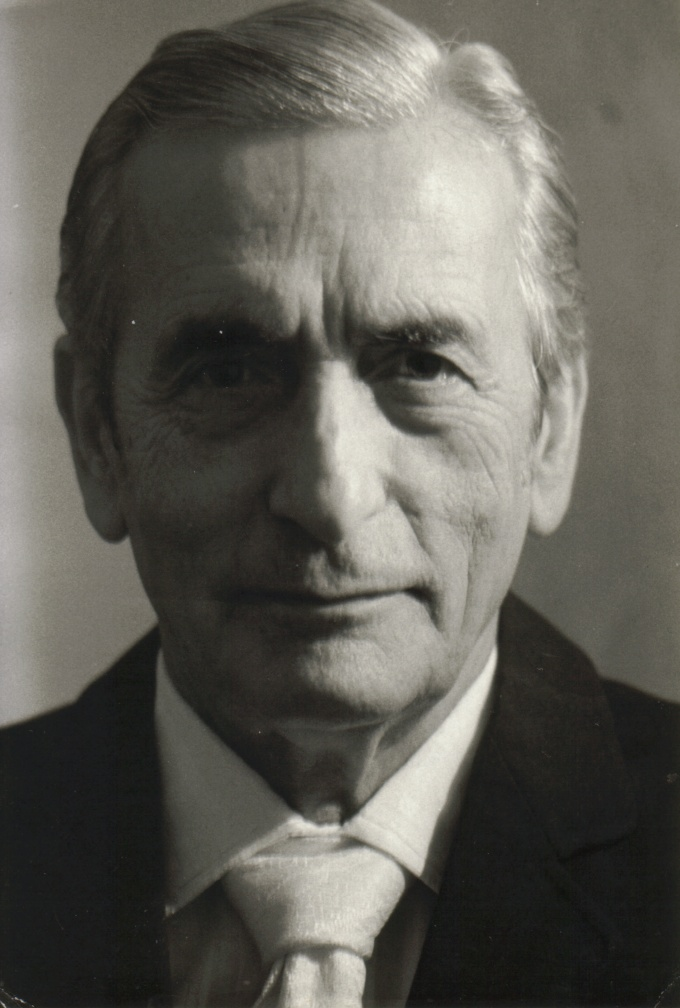
Giuseppe Anedda, 20th Century mandolinist.

Giuseppe Anedda (born Cagliari, 1 March 1912 – died Cagliari, 30 July 1997) was an Italian mandolin virtuoso who helped the mandolin gain more importance in the classical music world in the 20th Century. He performed with his instrument in concert halls around the world, including some where mandolin "had never entered", and taught at the Conservatory Pollini of Padua (holding "First Chair.") He also was able to gain access to manuscripts in museums, rediscovering works by Vivaldi, Pergolesi, Beethoven and many others.

Anedda started out a child prodigy, who began to study the violin at 5 years old, but had to switch to mandolin because of the family's inability to afford a violin. He was performing in theater and the opera by the time he was 10 years old. While still young, he also became part of a professional performing group, the Quartetto Karalis, with Flavio Cornacchia (mandola), Giovanni Scano (guitar), and Massimo Piredda (2nd mandolin).

He enlisted with the police at the Palazzo Reale di Napoli (Royal Palace of Naples), and in 1938 there had the opportunity to compete in a musical composition organized by the Opera Nazionale Dopolavoro (Italian Fascist leisure and recreational organization) winning for two straight years.

He started working for the Ente Italiano per le Audizioni Radiofoniche in 1941, and in 1948 was part of the first ever performance of the original concert of Vivaldi for two mandolins, strings and harpsichord, led by Maestro Nino Sanzogno. That performance was repeated at the Accademia di Santa Cecilia in 1950.

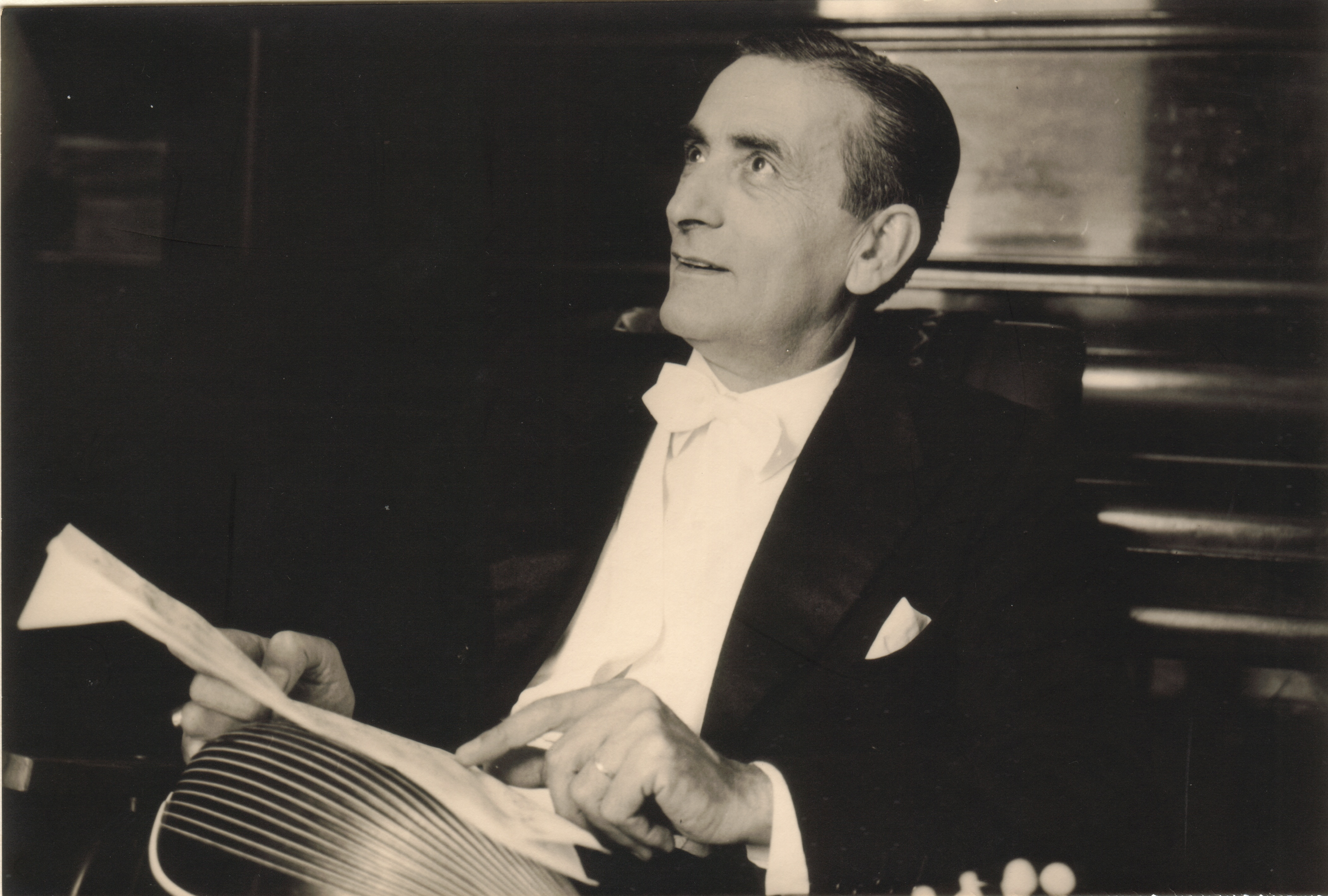
Giuseppe Anedda with a mandolin on his lap.

That performance led to a greater and longer term opportunity, when Maestro Renato Fasano wanted to include it in the repertoire of the Collegium Musicum Italicum. It was recorded in London for the His Master's Voice and won the award organized by the Academy Vivaldiana Brussels for the interpretation of the soloist. Anedda went on to direct the Collegium Italicum, one of the best chamber orchestras in the world, for more than over 16 years (1952-1968).

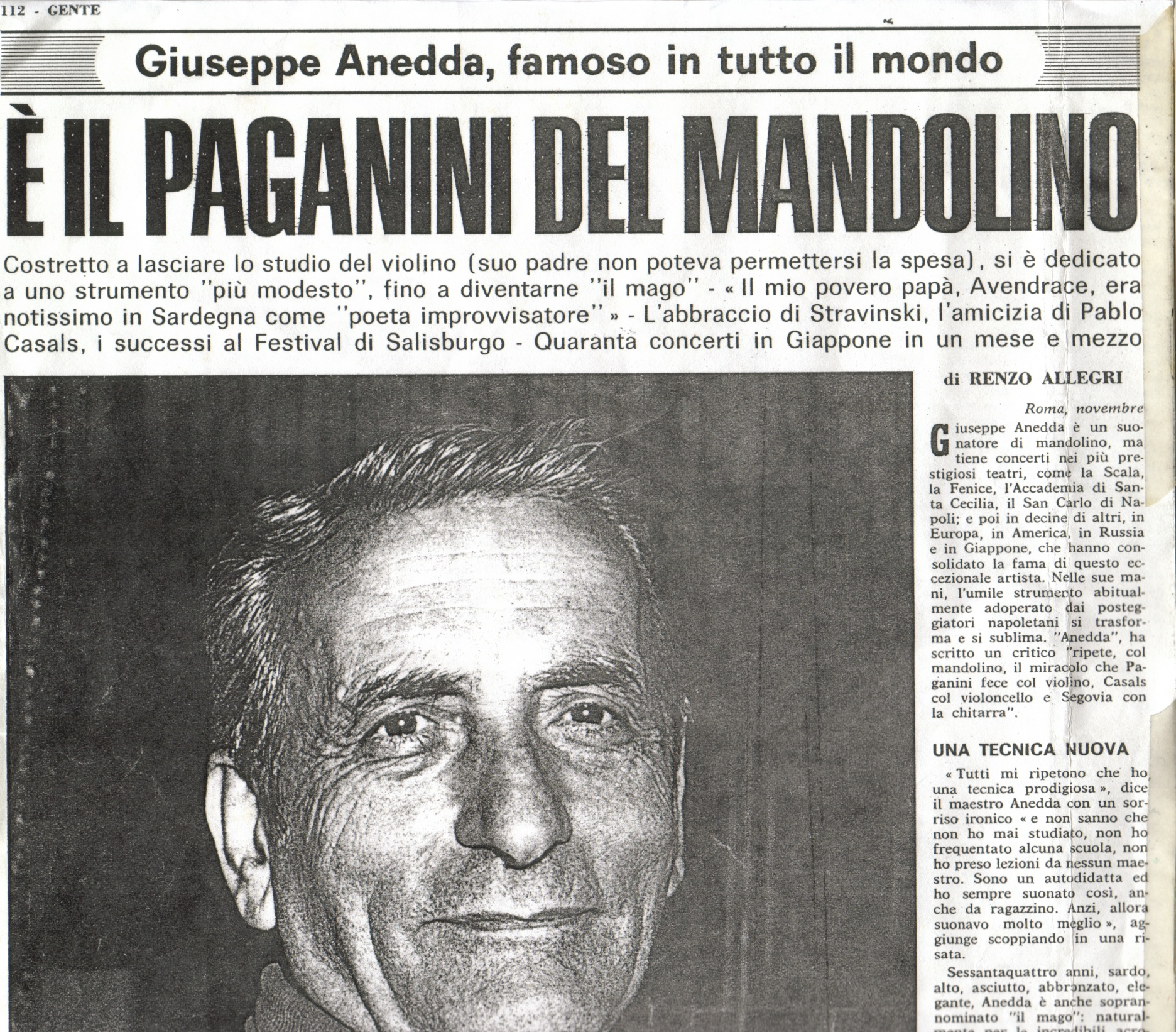
Giuseppe Anedda declared the "Paganini of the mandolin" in an Italian newspaper.

Another performance in 1968 sealed his place as "the world's greatest mandolinist", when he performed in Igor Stravinsky's new ballet, Agon. The audience reacted strongly to the performance, crying "Bravo Mandolino!" and Stravinsky himself shook hands with Anedda.

Anedda gave "countless concerts in all parts of the world", sometimes solo, or performing with orchestras or with pianist Franco Barbalonga. Beginning in 1970, he taught at the Manhattan School of Music. He gave concerts with Claudio Scimone in Switzerland, and the friendship between the two helped establish the "First Chair" for teaching the mandolin at the Conservatory Pollini of Padua, where Anedda remained until retiring in 1980.

His service was honored with a gold medal from the Presidency of the Italian Republic. He was also invited to the inauguration of the Festival of Two Worlds in Charleston in South Carolina, one of two Italians there.
