= Dorina Frati =

Italian classical mandolin player

Dorina Frati is an Italian classical mandolin player. She performs regularly with European orchestras such as The Philharmonic of La Scala, the National Academy of Santa Cecilia, the National Orchestra of RAI, the Chamber Orchestra of Mantua and the Philharmonic of Rome. She completed her studies with Giuseppe Anedda, graduating from the Pollini Conservatory of Padua, Italy.

== Work ==
Frati has performed under the direction of Riccardo Muti, who invited her to perform with the Bayrischer Rundfunk Simphonieorchester of Munich, Germany. With the same orchestra, under the direction of Lorin Maazel, she recorded “Das Lied der Erde” by Gustav Mahler. Ms. Frati performed under Muti with the Wiener Philharmoniker in Vienna, Berlin, Klagenfurt, and Ravenna.

Together with “I Solisti Veneti” and under the direction of C. Scimone, Ms. Frati performed in venues such as the Bunka Kaikan, the Teatro Colón, the Herkulessaal, Victoria Hall, Avery Fisher Hall, the Palau de la Musica Catalana, the Beijing Concert Hall, the Festspielhaus and the Musikverein. She joined in tours and festivals in Scotland, China, Finland, Greece, the U.S.A., Portugal, Australia, the Netherlands, Venezuela, Brazil, Yugoslavia, Czech Republic, and Japan.

Mrs. Frati collaborates with several Italian theatres and since 1987, she regularly plays with the Teatro alla Scala di Milano as the first mandolin. She performed under Maazel, C. Kleiber, C.M. Giulini and G. Sinopoli as well as with Muti, Zubin Mehta, D. Gatti, R. Chailly, G. Kuhn, and G. Noseda. She also traveled with il Teatro alla Scala to Moscow, Russia, where she has performed W.A. Mozart’s Don Giovanni at the Bolshoi theater.

Frati has recorded with various labels, most notably: Antonio Vivaldi and A. M. Giuliani's Concerto for Mandolin (Erato); Johann Hummel's Opera Omnia for Mandolin and Neapolitan Concertos for Mandolin (Dynamic); G. G. Boni’s Sonatas for Mandola (Tactus); with the Philharmonic of La Scala she recorded the soundtrack of a movie by Nino Rota (Sony) and Otello (EMI); with the Pavarotti International recorded for Decca; also recorded for Stradivarius, Agorà and Ducale. Most recently, she recorded the album Domenico Scarlatti ed il Mandolino nelle capitali europee for Dynamic in a duet with harpsichordist Daniele Roi.

Frati conducts the mandolin orchestra "Claudio e Mauro Terroni" at the musical center of Villaggio Sereno in Brescia, with which she won First Prize in the International Competition of Kerkrade in the Netherlands (1989) and in 1997, the 1st Absolute Prize at the International Competition of Ala. With the same orchestra she recorded two CDs; the latest is Sogni d'acrobata, for Esperia.

Frati premiered pieces, including the Concerto for Mandolin, Guitar, and Orchestra named "Fiori di Novembre" by A. Gilardino and "L'Isola del l'Amore" by the Swiss composer F. Hoch; who dedicated the piece to her.

She teaches mandolin at the Conservatory of Music "Cesare Pollini" in Padua.
