= Method (music) =

Textbook for a musical instrument

In music, a method is a kind of textbook for a specified musical instrument or a selected problem of playing a certain instrument.

A method usually contains fingering charts or tablatures, etc., scales and numerous different exercises, sometimes also simple etudes, in different keys, in ascending order as to difficulty (= in methodical progression) or with a focus on isolated aspects like fluency, rhythm, dynamics, articulation and the like. Sometimes there are even recital pieces, also with accompaniment. Such methods differ from etude books in that they are meant as a linear course for a student to follow, with consistent guidance, whereas volumes of etudes are not as comprehensive.

As typical instrumental methods are meant to function as textbooks supporting an instrumental teacher (rather than to facilitate self-teaching), usually no basic or special playing techniques are covered in any depth. Detailed instructions in this respect are only found in special, autodidactical methods.

Some methods are especially tailored for students on certain skill levels or stages of psychosocial development. In contrast, a 'complete' method (sometimes in multiple volumes) is meant to accompany the student until he or she becomes an advanced player.

Methods of certain authors or editors have achieved the status of standard works (reflecting regional and cultural differences) and are published or reissued by different publishing companies and in diverse (new) arrangements. The Suzuki Method is probably the most well known example of this.

The following is a list of various methods of historical interest.

== Woodwinds ==
=== Flute ===
- Altes, Henry. Method for the Boehm flute.
- Berbiguier, Benoit Tranquille. Flute method.
- De Lorenzo, Leonardo. L'Indispensabile – A complete modern school for the flute. (1912)
- Dressler, Rafael. New and complete instructions for the flute, Op. 68. (1827)
- Drouet, Louis. Method of flute playing. (1830)
- Fürstenau, Anton Bernhard. Flöten-schule, Op. 42. (1826)
- Fürstenau, Anton Bernhard. Die kunst des flötenspiels, Op.138. (1844)
- Hugot and Wunderlich. Méthode de flûte. (1804)
- Lindsay, Thomas. The elements of flute-playing. (1830)
- Monzani, Tebaldo. Instructions for the german flute. (1801)
- Peraut, Mathieu. Méthode pour la flûte. (1800)
- Jacques-Martin Hotteterre ‘’ Principes de la flûte traversière, ou flûte d'Allemangne, de la flûte à bec ou flûte douce et du hautbois, divisez par traictez’’.](1707)
- Quantz, Johann Joachim. Versuch einer anweisung die flöte traversiere zu spielen. (1752)
- Soussmann, Heinrich. Complete method for flute.
- Tromlitz, Johann George. Unterricht der flöte zu spielen. (1791)
- Wagner, Ernest. Foundation to flute playing.

=== Oboe ===
- Andraud, Albert. Practical and progressive oboe method.
- Barret, Apollon Marie-Rose. Complete method for oboe. (1850)
- Langley, Robin. Tutor for oboe.
- Niemann, Theodor. Method for the oboe.

=== Clarinet ===
- Bärmann, Karl. Volständige clarinett-schule. (1864)
- Klosé, Hyacinthe Eléonore. Conservatory Method For The Clarinet. (1879)
- Lazarus, Henry. New and modern method for the Albert- and Boehm-system clarinet. (1881)
- Robert_Stark|Stark, Robert. Grosse theoretische-praktische clarinett-schule, Op. 49. (1892)
- Magnani, Aurelio. Methode complete de clarinette. (1900)
- Gabler, Maximillian. Tutor. (1906)
- Mimart, Prospere. Methode nouvelle de clarinette. (1911)
- Bading, Heinrich and Lange, Hermann. Tutor. (1911)
- Gräfe, Richard. Method. (1912)
- Langenus, Gustav. Complete method for the Boehm clarinet. (1913)
- Reinecke, Carl. Foundation to clarinet playing : an elementary method. (1919)

=== Bassoon ===
- Langey, Otto. Tutor for bassoon.
- Mackintosh, George. New and improved bassoon tutor. (1840)
- Weissenborn, Julius. Practical method for the bassoon. (1887)
- Weissenborn, Julius and Spaniol, Douglas. The New Weissenborn Method for Bassoon. (2010, revised 2013)

=== Saxophone ===
- Klosé, Hyacinthe and Gay, Eugene. Methode complete pour saxophone.
- Iasilli, Gerardo. Modern conservatory method for saxophone.
- Mayeur, Louis-Adolphe. Method for saxophone.
- Vereecken, Ben. Foundation to saxophone playing.
- Vereecken, Ben. The saxophone virtuoso.
- Ville, Paul de. Universal method for the saxophone.

== Brass ==
=== Trumpet/Cornet ===
- Araldi, Giuseppe. Methodo per tromba a chiavi et a macchina. (1835)
- Arban, Jean-Baptiste. Method for the cornet. (1864)
- Arbuckle, Matthew. Complete cornet method. (1866)
- Brett, Harry. The cornet. (1888)
- Brulon, Adolphe. Méthode de cornet à deux et à trois pistons. (1854)
- Canti, Antonio. Metodo per cornetto flugelhorn in si bemòlle e per flugel basso. (1892)
- Clarke, Herbert Lincoln. Clarke's Elementary Studies for Cornet. (1909)
- Clarke, Herbert Lincoln. Clarke's Technical Studies for Cornet. (1912)
- Clarke, Herbert Lincoln. Clarke's Characteristic Studies for Cornet. (1915)
- Clodomir, Pierre François. Méthode élémetaire de cornet à pistons. (1870)
- Dauverné, François Georges Auguste. Methode de trompette à pistons. (1835)
- Dauverné, François Georges Auguste. Méthode théorique et pratique du cornet à pistons ou cylindres. (1846)
- Dauverné, François Georges Auguste. Méthode pour la trompette. (1857)
- Foraboschi Giuseppe. A new and complete instruction book for the trumpet. (1828)
- Forestier, Joseph. Method pour le cornet à pistons. (1834)
- Guichard, Michel. Grande méthode. (1864)
- Hoch, Theodor. Tutor for the cornet. (1880)
- Hofmann, Richard. Schule für althorn oder es-cornet. (1885)
- Howe, Elias. New cornet instructor. (1860)
- Kastner, Jean Georges. Metodo elementare per cornetto (o flicorno) a due e tre pistoni. (1892)
- Kosleck, Julius. Grosse Schule für cornet a piston.
- Kresser, Joseph Gebhardt. Methode pour la trompette.
- Kueffner, Joseph. Principes elementaires.
- Langey, Otto. Celebrated tutors: b-flat cornet. (1899)
- Mariscotti, Luigi. Nouvelle méthode complete de cornet à pistons. (1837)
- Roy, Eugene. Methode de trompette sans clefs et avec clefs divisee en deux parties. (1824)
- Ryan, Sidney. True cornet instructor. (1874)
- Saint-Jacome, Louis. Grand method for the cornet. (1894)
- Schlossberg, Max. Daily Drills and Technical Studies for Trumpet. (1937)
- Sedgwick, Alfred. Complete method for the cornet. (1873)
- Sinsolliez, Ainé. Méthode complète de cornet à trois pistons. (1848)
- Sussmann, Heinrich. Neue theoretisch practische trompeten-schule. (1859)
- Weber, Carl. The premier method for cornet. (1896)
- Winner, Septimus. The ideal method for the cornet. (1882)
- Wurm, Wilhelm. Method for cornet à pistons. (1893)

=== Horn ===
- Dauprat, Louis-François. Methode de cor alto et cor basse. (1824)
- Domnich, Heinrich. Methode de premier et de deuxieme cor. (1807)
- Duvernoy, Frederic. Methode pour le cor. (1803)
- Franz, Oscar. Grosse theoretisch-practische waldhorn-schule. (1880)
- Frohlich, Joseph. Hornschule. (1810)
- Gallay, Jacques-François. Méthode pour le cor. (1842)
- Göroldt, Johann Heinrich. Hornschule. (1822)
- Holyoke, Samuel. The instrumental assistant. (1807)
- Kling, Henri. Hornschule. (1865)
- Meifred, Joseph. Methode pour le cor chromatique ou a pistons. (1840)
- Pepper, James Welsh. Self instructor for french horn. (1882)
- Simpson, John. The complete tutor for the horn. (1746)
- Tully, Charles. Tutor for the French horn. (1840)

=== Trombone ===
- Arban, Jean-Baptiste. Grande méthode complete pour cornet a pistons et de saxhorn. (1864)
- Braun, André. Gamme et méthode pour les trombonnes alto, ténor, et basse. (1795)
- Brulon, Adolphe. Methode de trombone a coulisse. (1851)
- Cornette, Victor. Method for the trombone. (1838)
- Dieppo, Antoine. Méthode complete pour le trombone. (1836)
- Fillmore, Henry. Jazz trombonist. (1919)
- Fröhlich, Joseph. Vollständige theoretisch-practische musikschule. (1811)
- Gebauer, Francois Rene. 50 lecons pour la trombonne basse, alto, et tenor. (1800)
- Hampe, Carl. Method for the slide trombone with an appendix for the trombone with valves. (1916)
- Kastner, Jean Georges. Method for the trombone. (1845)
- Lafosse, André. Methode complete pour le trombone. (1921)
- Langey, Otto. Tutor for the tenor slide trombone. (1885)
- Müller, Robert. Schule für zugposaune. (1902)
- Nemetz, Andreas. Neueste posaun-schule. (1828)
- Sordillo, Fortunato. Art of jazzing for the trombone. (1920)
- Ville, Paul de. Universal method for slide and valve trombone in bass and treble clef. (1900)
- Vobaron, Edmond. Methode de trombone. (1853)
- Wirth, Adam. Posaune schule für alto, tenor, und bass posaune. (1870)

== Voice ==
- Abt, Franz. Praktische gesangschule, Op.474.
- Concone, Giuseppe. The school of sight-singing.
- García, Manuel. Ecole de Garcia: traité complet de l'art du chant.
- Lamperti, Francesco. The art of singing. (1890)
- Marchesi, Mathilde. The art of singing, Op. 21. (1890)
- Marchesi, Mathilde. Vocal method, Op. 31. (1900)
- Panofka, Heinrich. Abécédaire vocal.
- Panseron, Auguste. Méthode complète de vocalisation. (1898)
- Shakespeare, William. The art of singing. (1910)
- Vaccai, Nicola. Metodo pratico de canto. (1832)

== Keyboards ==
=== Piano ===
- Clementi, Muzio. Introduction to the art of playing on the pianoforte. (1801)
- Cramer, Johann Baptist. Instructions for the pianoforte. (1810)
- Czerny, Carl. Complete theoretical and practical pianoforte school, Op. 500. (1838)
- Dussek, Jan Ladislav. Instructions on the art of playing the piano forte or harpsichord. (1796)
- Herz, Henri. Méthode. (1838)
- Hummel, Johann Nepomuk. Ausführliche theoretisch-practische Anweisung zum Piano-Forte-Spiel. (1828)
- Philipp, Isidore. Complete school of Technic for the Piano.
- Pollini, Francesco. Methodo del clavicembelo. (1811)
- Rimbault, Edward Francis. A child's first instruction book for the piano forte. (1839)
- Safonov, Vasily Ilyich. New Formula for the Piano Teacher and Piano Student. (1916)
- Daniel Gottlob Türk. Klavier-Schule. (1789)

=== Harpsichord/Clavichord ===
- Bach, Carl Philipp Emanuel. Versuch über die wahre art das clavier zu spielen. (1753)
- Baumgarten, Charles Frederick. The ladies companion, or a complete tutor for the forte, piano forte, or harpsichord. (1784)
- Couperin, François. L'art de toucher le clavecin.] (1716)
- Gasparini, Francesco. L'Armonico Pratico al Cimbalo.

=== Organ ===
- Neukomm, Sigismund. An elementary method for the organ in general. (1859)
- Rinck, Johann Christian Heinrich. Praktische orgelschule, Op. 55. (1819)

== Strings ==
=== Guitar ===
- Aguado, Dionisio. Nuevo metodo de guitarra, Op. 6.
- Carcassi, Matteo. Methode complete pour la guitare, Op. 59.
- Carulli, Ferdinando. Méthode complette. (1815)
- Chabran, Carlo Francesco. Complete instructions for the Spanish guitar. (1795)
- Giuliani, Mauro. Studio per la chitarra, Op. 1. (1812)
- Justin Holland. Comprehensive Method for the Guitar and Modern Method for the Guitar (1874)
- Jauralde, Nicario. A complete preceptor for the Spanish guitar. (1827)
- Legnani, Luigi. Metodo par imparare e conoscere la musica e suonare la chitarra, Op. 250. (1847)
- Shaeffer, Arling. Elite guitar instructor. (1895)
- Sor, Fernando. Complete method for the guitar. (1851)

=== Harp ===
- Barthélemon, François-Hippolyte. Tutor for the harp. (1795)
- Bochsa, Nicholas Charles. The first 6 weeks, or daily precepts & examples for the harp. (1840)
- Dizi, François Joseph. "École de harpe", a complete treatise on the harp. (1827)
- Weippert, John Erhardt. The pedal harp rotula. (1800)

=== Mandolin or mandolin-banjo or banjolin ===
- Edgar Bara. Méthode de Mandoline et Banjoline (1903). Still in print.
- Bartolomeo Bortolazzi. Method in German, Anweisung die Mandoline von selbst zu erlernen nebst einigen Uebungsstucken von Bortolazzi (1805)
- Giuseppe Bellenghi. Method for the mandolin in three parts (Pub in French, English, Italian, German), La ginnastica del mandolino, Ascending and descending major and minor scales in all positions for the mandolin
- Giuseppe Branzoli. A Theoretical and practical method for the mandolin (1875, 2nd edition 1890)
- Ferdinando de Cristofaro. Méthode de mandolin (Paris, 1884) English, French, Italian, Portuguese, and Spanish versions
- Giovanni Cifolelli. Method for the mandolin (date unknown, estimated 1760s)
- Carlo Curti. Complete Method for the Mandolin (1896) English.
- Pietro Denis. Méthode pour apprendre à jouer de la mandoline sans Maître (1768, French)
- George H. Hucke. Forty Progressive Studies for the Mandoline (London, 1893, English)
- Carmine de Laurentiis. Method for the Mandolin (Milan, 1869 or 1874)
- Salvador Leonardi. Méthode pour Banjoline ou Mandoline-Banjo (1921, book has sections in English, French and Spanish)
- Carlo Munier. Scuola del mandolino (1895)
- Jean Pietrapertosa. Méthode de mandolin (1892) In French and English sections in same book
- Janvier Pietrapertosa Fils Méthode de mandolin ou banjoline (1903)
- Giuseppe Pettine. Pettine's Modern Mandolin School (c. 1900)
- Silvio Ranieri. L'Art de la Mandoline in 4 Bänden, Die Kunst des Mandolinspiels, in 5 Sprachen (französich, deutsch, englisch, italienisch und holländisch)
- Samuel Siegel. Special Mandolin Studies (1901).

=== Violin ===
- Bang, Maia. Violin method.
- Bériot, Charles de. Method for violin.
- Casorti, August. The Techniques of Bowing (Technik des Bogens und des rechten Handgelenks für Violine; Bogen-Technik für Violine), Op. 50 (published 1880)
- Geminiani, Francesco. The art of playing on the violin. (1751)
- Hohmann, Christian Heinrich. Practical violin method.
- Laoureux, Nicolaus. A practical method for violin.
- Mozart, Leopold. Gründliche Violinschule. (1756)
- Schradieck, Henry. The school of violin technics. (1900)
- Sevcik, Otakar. Violin school for beginners, Op.6. (1903)
- Sevcik, Otakar. School of violin technique, Op. 1. (1905)
- Sevcik, Otakar. School of bowing technique, Op. 2. (1905)
- Spohr, Louis. Violinschule. (1832)
- Wohlfahrt, Franz. Easiest elementary method for beginners, Op. 38.

=== Viola ===
- Cavallini, Eugenio. Viola method. (1845)
- Giorgetti, Ferdinando. Viola method, Op.34. (1840)

=== Violoncello ===
- Davydov, Karl. School of violoncello playing. (1888)
- Dotzauer, Justus Johann Friedrich. The violoncello method for elementary teaching, Op. 126. (1836)
- Dotzauer, Justus Johann Friedrich. The method of playing harmonics, Op. 147. (1837)
- Dotzauer, Justus Johann Friedrich. The practical method of violoncello playing, Op. 155.
- Dotzauer, Justus Johann Friedrich. The violoncello method, Op. 165. (1832)
- Duport, Jean-Louis. Instruction on the fingering and bowing of the violoncello. (1806)
- Gunn, John. The theory and practice of fingering the violoncello. (1789)
- Kummer, Friedrich August. Cello method, Op. 60. (1839)
- Lee, Sebastian. Method for the violoncello. (1845)
- Popper, David. High school of cello playing, Op. 73. (1901-1905)
- Romberg, Bernhard. A Complete Theoretical and Practical School for the Violoncello. (1839)
- Schroeder, Alwin (Schröder, Alvin). 170 Foundation Studies for Violoncello.
- Schoeder, Carl II (Schröder, Karl II). Practical Method for the Violoncello.
- Sevcik, Otakar. School of bowing technique. (1905)
- Werner, Josef. Practical method for cello, Op. 12. (1882)

=== Contrabass ===
- Fröhlich, Friedrich Theodor. Contrabass-schule. (1830)
- Simandl, Franz. New method for double bass. (1881)

== See also ==
- Music education
