= My Hat, It Has Three Corners =

European folk song with Neapolitan roots

"My Hat, It Has Three Corners" is a folk song that goes back to a Neapolitan melody. Today it is popular in Britain, Germany, Sweden, Norway and Portugal as a children's action song.

== Origin ==
The song is sung to the melody of "O mamma, mamma cara", which goes back to a Neapolitan canzonetta. It is a "remarkable example of a 'wandering melody' that makes its way through the most varied of musical works." Reinhard Keiser is said to have quoted the melody in his singspiel, Der Carneval von Venedig (1707), which was so successful that street lads kept inventing new texts for it. However the score of this singspiel has been lost, so that this information cannot be verified. Rodolphe Kreutzer used the melody in 1816 in the music for the ballet Le Carnaval de Venise choreographed by Louis Milon. Niccolò Paganini played variations of this melody in his concerts under the title of "Carnival of Venice", Op. 10 (1829). It was thanks to Paganini that the subject enjoyed greater popularity. Under the title "Souvenir de Paganini" Frédéric Chopin composed his Rondo No. 1 also as a variation on this melody. Other variations on the theme were created inter alia by Johann Strauss the Elder in versions for piano and orchestra respectively, Francisco Tárrega for guitar, Jean-Baptiste Arban for cornet and trumpet and Wilhelm Posse for harp. Variations for flute and piano were composed by Giulio Briccialdi (Carnevale di Venezia, Op. 78, c. 1855) and Paul Génin (Carnaval de Venise, Op. 14, 1872). The song was also popularised under the title "La bruna gondoletta" as a barcarole. Using this text Julius Benedict and others published concert variations for voice and accompaniments.

The text My hat, it has three corners describes the formerly commonly worn tricorne. Oral records in the German Folk Song Archive go back to the years before 1870. The text is first documented in print in the Saarland in 1886, there, however, still based on the melody of the folk song "Wer lieben will, muss leiden". The text has also come down to us from West Prussia. The opening words of the text also appear in a parody rhyme from the Palatinate region, which was recorded around 1920, but must go back to the time of Napoleon:

Mein Hut, der hat drei Ecke,
Drei Ecke hat mein Hut,
Napoleon soll verrecke,
Mit seiner blech'ne Schnut.

== Text ==
The Welsh version is as follows:

Mae gen i het dri chornel, Tri chornel sydd i’m het. Ac os nad oes tri chornel, Nid honno yw fy het.

In German, a language in which the text was popularised, the words are:

Mein Hut, der hat drei Ecken,
drei Ecken hat mein Hut.
Und hätt er nicht drei Ecken,
so wär’s auch nicht mein Hut.

A Bavarian drinking song parodies the theme:

Mein Hut, der hält drei Liter,
Und drei Liter hält mein Hut,
Un hält er nicht drei Liter,
so wär's auch nicht mein Hut.

The English version is as follows:

My hat, it has three corners,
Three corners has my hat.
And had it not three corners,
It would not be my hat.

The Swedish version is as follows:

Min hatt, den har tre kanter,
tre kanter har min hatt.
och har den ej tre kanter,
så är det ej min hatt!

The Brazilian version is as follows:

O meu chapéu tem três pontas,
Três pontas tem o meu chapéu.
Se não tivesse três pontas,
Não seria o meu chapéu.

The Portuguese version is as follows:

O meu chapéu tem três bicos,
Tem três bicos o meu chapéu.
Se não tivesse três bicos,
O chapéu não era meu.

The Hebrew version is as follows:

לַכּוֹבַע שֶׁלִּי שָׁלוֹשׁ פִּנּוֹת
שָׁלוֹשׁ פִּנּוֹת לַכּוֹבַע שֶׁלִּי
לוּלֵא הָיוּ לוֹ שָׁלוֹשׁ פִּנּוֹת
לֹא הָיָה זֶה הַכּוֹבַע שֶׁלִּי.

== Action song ==
The song can be performed as an action song, in which, as in a missing word song, another word is not sung with each stanza and only mimed using actions. If someone accidentally sings the missing word, they usually have to drop out or pay a penalty or a forfeit.

In this version, the words of the song may accompanied by the following gestures:

- my – point at yourself with your index finger
- hat – touch your head or the imaginary brim of your hat
- three – stretch out three fingers
- corners – touch your elbow with your hand
- not – shake your head
