= Arban's Complete Conservatory Method for Trumpet =

Trumpet method book

- Front cover of the 1879 edition
- Author: Jean-Baptiste Arban
- Original title: La grande méthode complète de cornet à piston et de saxhorn par Arban
- Subject: Musical Instruments: Studies and exercises, Cornet music, Trumpet music
- Genre: Sheet music

Arban's Complete Conservatory Method for Trumpet is a method book for students of trumpet, cornet, and other brass instruments. The original edition, Grande méthode complète de cornet à pistons et de saxhorn, was written and composed by Jean-Baptiste Arban (1825-1889) and published in Paris by Léon Escudier in 1864. It was reissued by multiple publishers, with notable revisions made by Thomas H. Rollinson published in 1879 by J.W. Pepper; Edwin Franko Goldman, published in 1893 by Carl Fischer; and Claude Gordon, published in 1982 also by Carl Fischer. It contains hundreds of exercises ranging from basic to advanced compositions, with later editions also including a selection of popular themes as solos and duets by various composers, and several original compositions by Arban including his famous arrangement of Carnival of Venice.

== Structure ==
=== Introduction ===
In the introduction, Arban covers the range of the cornet (trumpet). He also details alternate fingerings and describes the use of the tuning slide. Arban says in his opinion that the mouthpiece should be two-thirds on the lower lip and one-third on the upper. Arban then stresses the proper "attack" technique. He uses the "tu" pronunciation, which in French is said with the tongue in the "tee" position. Arban concludes with proper breathing technique (see diaphragmatic breathing).

=== I. First Studies ===
Arban then begins his method with a focus on tone (Studies 1-10). The next studies (11-50) familiarize students with fingerings and develop their range. These studies intend to instill in the student precision in attacking the notes. The next section, devoted to syncopation, goes from a simple quarter-half-quarter rhythm to a sixteenth-eighth-sixteenth repeated rhythm. Arban next focuses on the dotted eighth-sixteenth and eighth-double sixteenth rhythms. He ends the First Studies with 10 studies on the 6/8 meter.

=== II. Playing Methods: Slurring or Legato Playing ===
This section focusses on slurring and legato playing. It begins with simple slurs that are accomplished by the variation of valves. The suggestion is made pronouncing "taw-ee" while playing. The editor recommends adding little more air on the top note. (Such a technique is also needed to accomplish trills.) Arban devotes half of the whole section to lip slurs. He concludes with a series of advanced studies combining slurred and staccato playing.

=== III. Scales ===
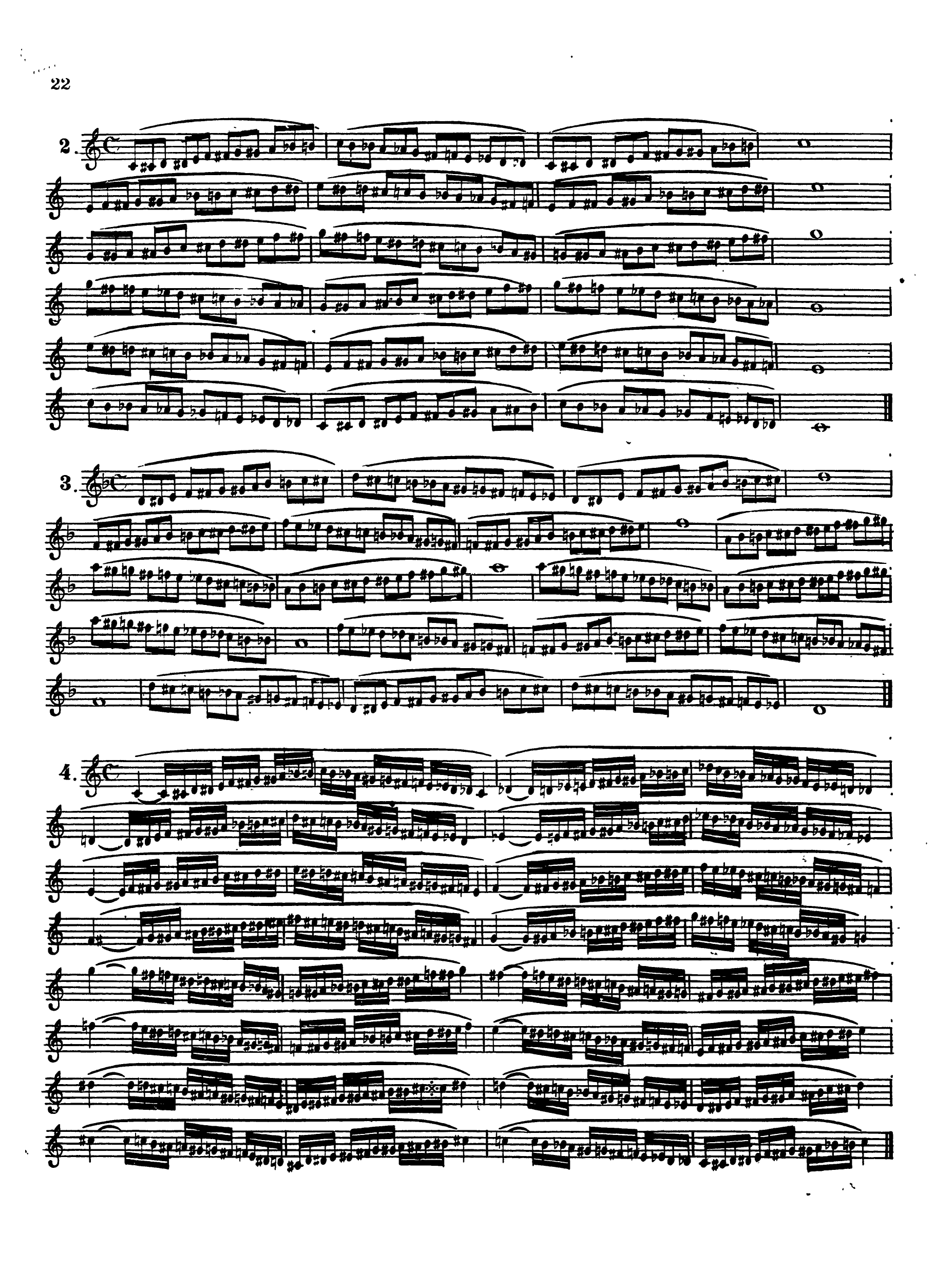
A chromatic scale exercise from Arban's Method.

Arban's series on scales includes studies of major, minor, and chromatic scales, as well as numerous variations thereof. Arban admits to giving minor scales "limited treatment," but Gordon refutes this by citing the nonexistence of "limits on the use of the Trumpet and Cornet."

=== IV. Ornaments ===
Next, Arban teaches the student the various ornaments that can be played on a trumpet or cornet. He details the simple appoggiatura, grace note (short appoggiatura), portamento, double appoggiatura, the turn, the trill, and the mordent. Arban concludes the fourth section by combining the various ornaments and integrating them into various tunes.

=== V. More Advanced Studies ===
The "more advanced studies" include studies on intervals; broken octaves and tenths; triplets; the four-sixteenth rhythmic figure; major and minor arpeggios; the dominant seventh arpeggio; and cadenzas.

=== VI. Tonguing ===
Next, Arban focuses on triple tonguing, double tonguing, and fanfare tonguing. Arban uses various "tu-ku" pronunciation combinations, and Gordon subsequently replaces these with "tee-kee" combinations. In his studies on double tonguing, Arban includes a score of studies in which he combines double tonguing with slurs occurring on various beats and within them.

=== The Art of Phrasing: 150 Classic and Popular Melodies ===
The Art of Phrasing was written by Arban in 1866, but was never added to the original French edition of the Method. These songs and duets first appeared in the American Edition of the Arban Method published by the Jean White Company in 1872. This new version added 28 duets entitled 28 Recreations, 32 Melodies, and 100 Art of the Phrasing songs. J.W. Pepper and Carl Fischer also added the Art of Phrasing to their Arban Methods in the late 1800s.

=== 68 Duets for Two Cornets ===
As in his other sections, Arban progresses from simple pieces to more challenging ones.

Compositions
#	Arban's Title	Composer (if given)
1	Sacred Song	"Portniansky" (Dmitry Bortniansky)
2	Russian Hymn	
3	Cradle Song	Carl Maria von Weber
4	Melody	
5	Melody	
6	Melody	Saverio Mercadante
7	Adeste Fideles	
8	God Save the Queen / America	
9	Air by Mozart	Wolfgang Amadeus Mozart
10	Air by Gretry	André Grétry
11	Noel Ancien	
12	Air by Beethoven	Ludwig van Beethoven
13	Arabian Song	
14	Serenade	André Grétry
15	La Romanesca	
16	Romance from "Joseph"	Étienne Méhul
17	Romance	Jacques de Gouy
18	Noel Ancien	
19	March	Jacques de Gouy
20	Song of Master Adam	
21	Le Souvenir	
22	Richard of the Lion Heart	André Grétry
23	The Two Savoyards	
24	Silent Sorrow	Samuel Webbe
25	Melody	
26	The Lion Hunt	Saverio Mercadante
27	L'Elisir D'Amore	Gaetano Donizetti
28	I Would That My Love	Felix Mendelssohn
29	Prayer to the Virgin	Saverio Mercadante
30	Spanish Royal March	
31	March of Two Misers	
32	Melody	
33	Country Wedding	
34	Bivouac Song	
35	Birthday Festival	
36	Melody	
37	German Song	Friedrich Wilhelm Kücken
38	Richard of the Lion Heart	André Grétry
39	March	Jacques de Gouy
40	Tic e Tic e Toc	
41	Carnival of Venice	
42	Nel Cor Piu	Giovanni Paisiello
43	Bolero	Jacques de Gouy
44	Norma	Vincenzo Bellini
45	Melody	
46	Last Rose of Summer	
47	Evening Prayer	Saverio Mercadante
48	Cavatina from "Somnambula"	Vincenzo Bellini
49	Austrian National Hymn	Joseph Haydn
50	Freischutz	Carl Maria von Weber
51	French Air	
52	Burning Fever	André Grétry
53	L'Elisir D'Amore	Gaetano Donizetti
54	Air from "Somnambula"	Vincenzo Bellini
55	Wind and Wave	
56	Tyrolienne	
57	Italian Air	
58	Alpine Horn	Heinrich Proch
59	The Hermit	Michel Lambert
60	Freischutz	Carl Maria von Weber
61	Flower of Damascus	Saverio Mercadante
62	Waltz from "Puritani"	Vincenzo Bellini
63	Prayer from "Moses"	Gioachino Rossini
64	Siege of Rochelle	Michael William Balfe
65	Hail! Star of Mary	Heinrich Proch
66	The Two Friends	"Laurent"
67	Martha	Friedrich von Flotow
68	The Fox Hunters	

=== 14 Characteristic Studies ===
Before his final 12 fantasias, Arban provides 14 challenging characteristic studies. His concluding remarks are:

Those of my readers who… want to attain… perfection, should… try to hear good music well interpreted. They must seek out… the most illustrious models, and… purify their taste, verify their sentiments, and bring themselves as near as possible to that which is beautiful.

These passages are challenging and are longer than all of the previous sections' pieces. Each is a full page long (in the platinum edition), and they crescendo in difficulty as they progress; the fourteenth study is two pages long and the only piece in this section in 12/8 time.

Characteristic Studies
No.	Tempo Marking	Written Keys	Meter	Subdivision
1	Allegro moderato = 96	C major, E♭ major, D major, and G major	common time	Sixteenth note
2	Legato = 120	E major and E♭ major	common time	Sixteenth note and Eighth note
3	Moderato = 86	C major, F major, D major, and G major	common time	Sixteenth note triplet and Sixteenth note
4	Allegretto = 88	E minor, G major, C major, A minor, and A♭ major	2/4	Sixteenth note triplet and Sixteenth note alternation
5	Allegro = 104	C major	2/4	Sixteenth note triplet and Sixteenth note alternation
6	Moderato = 76	F major and D major	6/8	Sixteenth note
7	Allegro = 104	C major, A♭ major, and B major	2/4	Sixteenth note triplet and Eighth note
8	Allegro moderato = 104	D minor and F major	common time	Sixteenth note
9	Allegro = 124	B♭ major	common time	Sixteenth note
10	Allegro = 124	G minor, C minor, and D major	common time	Sixteenth note
11	Allegretto = 96	C major, A♭ major, and D♭ major	common time	Sixteenth note
12	Allegro moderato = 100	F minor, D♭ major, and C major	3/4	Sixteenth note
13	Allegro non troppo = 96	C major	2/4	Sixteenth note triplet
14	Legato chromatique = 76	C major and F major	12/8	Sixteenth note and Thirty-second note

=== 12 Celebrated Fantasies and Airs Varies ===
In addition to the eleven fantasias (fantasies) for B-flat cornets, there is one for the A cornet ("Fantasie and Variations on Acteon"). Arban's celebrated composition "Fantasie and Variations on The Carnival of Venice" is the eleventh fantasia in the list.

Pieces
No.	Arban's Title	Concert Key	Structure
1	Fantaisie and Variations on a Cavatina from Beatrice di Tenda by V. Bellini	B♭ major	Introduction, Theme, Var. I, Var. II, Var. III and Finale I, and Finale II
2	Fantaisie and Variations on Actéon	D major	Introduction (in D minor), Theme, Var. I, and Finale
3	Fantaisie Brillante	B♭ minor	Introduction, Theme, Var. I, Var. II, and Var. III
4	Variations on a Tyrolean Song	B♭ major	Introduction (in F major), Theme, Var. I, Var. II, Var. III., Var. IV, and Rondo
5	Variations on a song Vois-tu la neige qui brille (The Beautiful Snow)	E♭ major	Theme, Var. I, Var. II, Var. III, and Finale
6	Cavatina and Variations	B♭ major	Introduction (in F major), Theme, Var. I, Var. II, and Var. III
7	Air Varié on a Folk Song: The Little Swiss Boy	B♭ major	Introduction, Theme, Var. I, Var. II, Var. III (in G♭ major), and Var. IV et Finale
8	Caprice and Variations	E♭ major	Introduction (in B♭ major), Theme, Var. I, Var. II, and Var. III
9	Fantaisie and Variations on a German Theme	E♭ major	Introduction (in B♭ major), Theme, Var. I, Var. II, Var. III, and Finale
10	Variations on a favorite theme by C.M. von Weber	E♭ major	Introduction (in B♭ major), Theme, Var. I, Var. II, Var. III, and Var. IV (in B♭ major)
11	Fantaisie and Variations on The Carnival of Venice	E♭ major	Introduction, Theme, Var. I, Var. II, Var. III, and Var. IV
12	Variations on a theme from Norma by V. Bellini	B♭ major	Introduction (in E♭ major), Theme, Var. I, Var. II, and Finale

== Titles and versions ==
Arban’s book has been published with different titles, and with variations for different instruments.

- Arban ́s Complete Celebrated Method for the Cornet
- My First Arban; For the Developing Student
- Arban Method for Trombone and Baritone
- Arban’s Complete Conservatory Method for Trumpet
- Arban’s Famous Method for Trombone
- Complete Conservatory Method for CC Tuba
