= Louis Cahuzac =

French musician (1880–1960)

- Born: Louis Jean Baptiste Cahuzac; July 12, 1880; Quarante, France
- Died: August 9, 1960 (aged 80); Bagnères-de-Luchon, France
- Education: Conservatoire de Paris
- Occupations: clarinetist, composer

Louis (Jean Baptiste) Cahuzac (12 July 1880 – 9 August 1960) was a French clarinetist and composer. Cahuzac was an outstanding performer and one of the few clarinetists who made a career as a soloist in the first part of the 20th century.

== Life and career ==
Louis Cahuzac was born in Quarante, in Languedoc, in the south of France. His teachers were Felix Pagès in Toulouse conservatoire and Cyrille Rose in the Paris Conservatory.

Cahuzac made the first recording of Carl Nielsen's Clarinet Concerto, a piece originally written for the Danish clarinetist Aage Oxenvad. On 22 November 1956, at the age of 76, he recorded the Clarinet Concerto in A major by Paul Hindemith for the EMI music label under the composer's baton.

He was a great teacher also and many students became famous like Eduard Brunner (Munich's Bavarian Radio Symphony), Yona Ettlinger, Hans Rudolph Stalder, Gervase de Peyer, André Boutard (Paris Opera) or Gilbert Voisin (Geneva international prize winner in 1950) and Palle Nehammer (Royal Danish Orchestra). Cahuzac died at Bagnères-de-Luchon.

== Compositions ==
His compositions were mainly for the clarinet and all are inspired by his native region in Southern France:

- In the Fantaisie sur un vieil air champêtre the theme is introduced by the piano, followed by a dazzling cadenza. This is followed by four variations exploring the full resources of the clarinet.
- Arlequin for solo clarinet evokes Harlequin, one of the characters in the Italian commedia del arte.
- The Pastorale cévenole as well as Cantilène radiate with the Mediterranean light of his beloved southern France and echo-type effects suggest open, mountainous spaces.
- His Variations sur un air du pays d'Oc (Variations on a tune from the South of France) is a set of four variations on Se Canto, a song from the valley of the Garonne.

== Discography ==
=== Recordings by Cahuzac ===
- Luigi Bassi. Les grands maîtres da la Clarinette, Fantaisie Brilliante sue Rigoletto (G. Verdi), Dante Productions LYS 366 ℗1998
- Louis Cahuzac. The French Clarinet School Revisited, Cantilène, Grenadilla RGP-10008CD
- Louis Cahuzac. Les grands maîtres da la Clarinette, Variations sur un air du pays d'Oc, Dante Productions LYS 366 ℗1998
- Marc Delmas. Les grands maîtres da la Clarinette, Fantaisie Italienne op.110, Dante Productions LYS 366 ℗1998
- Paul Hindemith. Clarinet Concerto in A-major, Composers in Person, EMI Classics, CDS 5 55032 2
- Arthur Honegger. The French Clarinet School Revisited, Sonatine, Grenadilla RGP-10008CD
- Paul Jeanjean. Les grands maîtres da la Clarinette, Clair Matin, Dante Productions LYS 366 ℗1998
- Paul Jeanjean. Les grands maîtres da la Clarinette, Arabesques, Dante Productions LYS 366 ℗1998
- Paul Jeanjean. The French Clarinet School Revisited, Arabesques, Grenadilla RGP-10008CD
- Paul Lacôme. Les grands maîtres da la Clarinette, Rigaudon, Dante Productions LYS 366 ℗1998
- Aurélio Magnani. Les grands maîtres da la Clarinette, Mazurka-caprice, Dante Productions LYS 366 ℗1998
- Aurélio Magnani. Historical Recordings, Volume II, Mazurka-caprice, Clarinet Classics CC0010 ©1994, ℗1994
- Georges Migot. Les grands maîtres da la Clarinette, Quatuor pour Flûte, Violon, Clarinette et Harpe, Dante Productions LYS 366 ℗1998
- Henri Paradis. Les grands maîtres da la Clarinette, Introduction et variations sur l'air de Marlborough, Dante Productions LYS 366 ℗1998
- Henri Paradis. The French Clarinet School Revisited, Introduction et variations sur l'air de Marlborough, Grenadilla RGP-10008CD
- Gabriel Pierné. Les grands maîtres da la Clarinette, Canzonetta, Dante Productions LYS 366 ℗1998
- Gabriel Pierné. The French Clarinet School Revisited, Canzonetta, Grenadilla RGP-10008CD
- Carl Maria von Weber. Les grands maîtres da la Clarinette, Concertino, Dante Productions LYS 366 ℗1998

=== Recordings of his compositions ===
- Hans Petter Bonden. Mozart, Schubert, Cahuzac, Cantilène Simax PSC 1018, ©1988, ℗1984
- Hans Petter Bonden. Mozart, Schubert, Cahuzac, Variations sur un air du pays d'Oc Simax PSC 1018, ©1988, ℗1984
- Hans Petter Bonden. Mozart, Schubert, Cahuzac, Arlequin Simax PSC 1018, ©1988, ℗1984
- Hans Petter Bonden. Mozart, Schubert, Cahuzac, Pastorale cévenole Simax PSC 1018, ©1988, ℗1984
- Louis Cahuzac. Les grands maîtres da la Clarinette, Variations sur un air du pays d'Oc, Dante Productions LYS 366 ℗1998
- Louis Cahuzac. The French Clarinet School Revisited, Cantilène, Grenadilla RGP-10008CD
- Philippe Cuper "The complete works of Louis Cahuzac", Clarinet Classics CC065 (2011)
- Guy Dangain. Louis Cahuzac: L'Œuvre pour Clarinette, Fantaisie sur un vieil air champêtre Caliope CAL 9338, ©2004, ℗2003
- Guy Dangain. Louis Cahuzac: L'Œuvre pour Clarinette, Pastorale cévenole Caliope CAL 9338, ©2004, ℗2003
- Guy Dangain. Louis Cahuzac: L'Œuvre pour Clarinette, Cantilène Caliope CAL 9338, ©2004, ℗2003
- Guy Dangain. Louis Cahuzac: L'Œuvre pour Clarinette, Variations sur un air du pays d'Oc Caliope CAL 9338, ©2004, ℗2003
- Ricardo Morales. French Portraits, Cantilène Boston Records BR1064CD, ©2004, ℗2004
- David Weber. A portrait of David Weber, Arlequin, Clarinet Classics CC0041, ©2002, ℗2002
- David Weber. Les grands maîtres da la Clarinette, Arlequin, Dante Productions LYS 500, ℗1978
- Philippe Cuper: The first complete music by Cahuzac from the manuscript, (2002 recording but published in 2011 by "Clarinet Classics")

== Sources ==
- Liner Notes, Northbranch Records
- Notes by Michael Weber (2001) accompanying "A Portrait of David Weber: 'A Grand Master of the Clarinet' (Clarinet Classics CD CC0041)
