= Tiburtia gens =

Ancient Roman family

The gens Tiburtia was a minor plebeian family at ancient Rome. Hardly any members of this gens are mentioned in history, but a large number are known from inscriptions.

== Origin ==
The nomen Tiburtius is derived from the earlier cognomen Tiburtes, referring to an inhabitant of the ancient city of Tibur in Latium. This indicates that the Tiburtii claimed descent from a Tiburtine family that settled at Rome, or else obtained Roman citizenship at an early period. Chase classifies the nomen among those gentilicia that either originated at Rome, or which cannot be shown to have come from anywhere else.

== Praenomina ==
The main praenomina of the Tiburtii were Lucius and Gaius, the two most common names at all periods of Roman history. While a number of other common praenomina are found amongst the inscriptions of this gens, the only ones that appear more than once are Aulus, Marcus, Publius, and Titus.

== Members ==
This list includes abbreviated praenomina. For an explanation of this practice, see filiation.

- Aulus Tiburtius A. l. Timiso, one of the leaders of the ironworkers' guild at Praeneste in Latium during the late second century or the early first century BC.
- Tiburtia Posilla, buried at Tarquinii in Etruria, aged sixty, in a tomb dating from the first quarter of the first century BC.
- Gaius Tiburtius C. l. Flaccus, a freedman named in an inscription from Casilinum in Campania, dating from the first half of the first century BC.
- Lucius Tiburtius, a centurion who was present at a parley along the Apsus between the forces of Caesar and Pompeius during the Civil War. As Titus Labienus conferred with Publius Vatinius, the soldiers of each side began fighting, and Tiburtius was among the officers who were wounded.
- Quintus Tiburtius Q. l. Menolavus, a freedman buried at Casilinum, in a tomb dating from the late first century BC.
- Tiburtia T. l., buried at Baeterrae in Gallia Narbonensis, in a tomb dating from the first half of the first century.
- Tiburtia Ɔ. l. Chelido, a freedwoman buried at Rome in the first half of the first century.
- Gaius Tiburtius M. f. Clemens, buried at Ateste in Venetia and Histria, in a tomb built by his sister, Tiburtia Quarta, dating from the first half of the first century.
- Tiburtia M. f. Quarta, dedicated a tomb at Ateste, dating from the first half of the first century, for her brother, Gaius Tiburtius Clemens.
- Publius Tiburtius Buttus, one of the principals in an auction at Pompeii in AD 55.
- Tiburtia Egloge, named in an inscription from Pompeii.
- Lucius Tiburtius Atticus, a freedman, buried along with Lucius Tiburtius Telesphorus, in a first-century tomb at Rome, built by Lucius Tiburtius Tyrannus and Artoria Corinthas.
- Lucius Tiburtius L. f. Priamus, one of the Seviri Augustales at Ticinum in Gallia Narbonensis, at some point during the first century.
- Lucius Tiburtius Telesphorus, buried along with the freedman Lucius Tiburtius Atticus, in a first-century tomb at Rome, built by his client, Lucius Tiburtius Tyrannus, and Artoria Corinthias.
- Lucius Tiburtius Tyrannus, along with Artoria Corinthias, built a first-century tomb at Rome for Tyrannus' patron, Lucius Tiburtius Telesphorus, and the freedman Lucius Tiburtius Atticus.
- Tiburtia T. l. Aura, a freedwoman buried in a family sepulchre at Rome, built by her son, Titus Tiburtius Natalis, for himself, his wife, Venelia Primigenia, and his mother, dating to the middle of the first century.
- Titus Tiburtius T. Ɔ l. Natalis, a freedman, built a family sepulchre at Rome, dating to the middle of the first century, for himself, his wife, Venelia Primigenia, and his mother, Tiburtia Aura.
- Tiburtius Heros, named in a sepulchral inscription from Rome, dating from the late first century.
- Aulus Tiburtius Campester, buried at Salona in Dalmatia, aged forty, in a tomb dedicated by his children, dating from the first century, or the first half of the second.
- Marcus Tiburtius Thiasus, buried in a first- or second-century tomb at Rome, aged twenty-five, along with Prima, perhaps his wife.
- Tiburtia Am[...]is, buried at Carales in Sardinia, aged sixty, in a tomb dedicated by her daughter, Julia Amana, dating between the middle of the first century, and the middle of the second.
- Tiburtia Nice, named in an inscription from Concordia in Venetia and Histria, dating from the late first or early second century.
- Tiburtia Euphrosyne, dedicated a tomb at Rome for her brother, Tiberius Claudius Bithynicus, dating between the middle of the first century, and the end of the second.
- Tiburtia Felicula, along with [...]cilius, dedicated a tomb at Narnia in Umbria, dating from the first half of the second century, for her husband, Titus Gargilius Januarius.
- Gaius Tiburtius Verna, a second-century maker of a lead pipes at Tibur in Latium.
- Tiburtius Serotinus, dedicated a tomb at Mutina in Cisalpine Gaul, dating between the middle and the end of the second century, for Faustina, a psaltria, or harpist.
- Gaius Tiburtius Alphius, together with his wife, Valeria Potita, built a tomb at Tibur, dating from the late second century, or the first half of the third, to their foster son, Gaius Sextilius Rufus, aged seven years, ten months, and ten days.
- Tiburtius, supposed to have been a Christian martyr in the early third century, along with his brother, Valerian, and the latter's wife, Caecilia, and a soldier named Maximus, around AD 230. As Christian saints, Tiburtius, Valerian, and Maximus were traditionally honored with a feast on the eighteenth day before the Kalends of May (April 14), while Caecilia's feast day is November 22.
- Tiburtius, buried at Rome, in a tomb dating from the early fourth century.
- Tiburtius, named in a fourth-century sepulchral inscription from Rome.
- Tiburtius, dedicated a fourth-century tomb at Rome for his wife, Eulalia.
- Tiburtius, buried at Rome on the seventh day before the Nones of December (Note: This may be a mistake, as the Nones of December fall on December 5, and counting inclusively, in the Roman fashion, December 2 would be the fourth day before the Nones; December 1 would be the Kalends of December, and the seventh day before the Nones would be November 29. If this date is not intentional, it may be that the inscription should say the seventh day before the Kalends, November 25, or the seventh day before the Ides, December 7.) in AD 377, aged twenty-six years, nine months, and eleven days.
- Tiburtius, buried at Rome, in a tomb dating from the end of the fourth century, or the first quarter of the fifth.
- Tiburtius Severus, a shopkeeper at Rome early in the fifth century, according to an inscription dating between AD 402 and 408.

=== Undated Tiburtii ===
- Lucius L. f. Tiburtius, the son of Lucius Tiburtius [...]io, for whom he and his mother, Vibia, built a tomb at Rome.
- Tiburtia Anytes, buried at Rome, with a monument dedicated by her husband, Botrys.
- Gaius Tiburtius C. f. Atticus, buried at Tibur in a tomb dedicated by his son, also named Gaius Tiburtius Atticus, was twice one of the quattuorviri of Tibur.
- Gaius Tiburtius C. f. C. n. Atticus, dedicated a tomb at Tibur for his father, also named Gaius Tiburtius Atticus.
- Tiburtia Chrotis, named in a sepulchral inscription from Rome.
- Gaius Tiburtius Comus, buried at Tibur.
- Gaius Tiburtius Felix, dedicated a tomb at Tibur for his wife, Flavia Nice.
- Lucius Tiburtius Felix, buried at Rome, aged twenty-five, in a tomb built by his wife, Laberia Briseis.
- Lucius Tiburtius [...]io, buried at Rome, in a tomb built by his son, Lucius Tiburtius, and wife, Vibia Apr[...].
- Publius Tiburtius Julianus, a soldier in the Legio III Augusta, buried at Lambaesis in Numidia, with a monument from his heir, Gaius Sergius Fortunatus.
- Tiburtia Maxima, buried at the site of modern Loulou, formerly part of Numidia, aged fifty-five.
- Sextus Tiburtius Sex. l. Nicephor, a freedman buried at Rome, along with the freedwoman Appuleia Helena and the freedman Lucius Appuleius Demetrius.
- Tiburtius Rusticus, dedicated a monument at Lambaesis for his father, Lucius Tiburtius Saturninus.
- Gaius Tiburtius Saturninus, a soldier stationed at Lambaesis.
- Lucius Tiburtius Saturninus, buried at Lambaesis, aged ninety-six, with a monument from his son, Tiburtius Rusticus.
- Tiburtia M. f. Secunda, buried at Ateste.
- Tiburtia Sphragis, together with her husband, Polybius, dedicated a tomb at Tibur for their son, Claudius Charopinus, aged twenty-five.
- Decimus Tiburtius Successus, built a family sepulchre at Rome for himself, his wife, Cominia Euthychia, his patron, Cominia Heurisis, and Titius Secundus.

== See also ==
- List of Roman gentes

== Bibliography ==
- Gaius Julius Caesar, Commentarii de Bello Civili (Commentaries on the Civil War).
- Theodor Mommsen et alii, Corpus Inscriptionum Latinarum (The Body of Latin Inscriptions, abbreviated CIL), Berlin-Brandenburgische Akademie der Wissenschaften (1853–present).
- Giovanni Battista de Rossi, Inscriptiones Christianae Urbis Romanae Septimo Saeculo Antiquiores (Christian Inscriptions from Rome of the First Seven Centuries, abbreviated ICUR), Vatican Library, Rome (1857–1861, 1888).
- René Cagnat et alii, L'Année épigraphique (The Year in Epigraphy, abbreviated AE), Presses Universitaires de France (1888–present).
- George Davis Chase, "The Origin of Roman Praenomina", in Harvard Studies in Classical Philology, vol. VIII, pp. 103–184 (1897).
- Stéphane Gsell, Inscriptions Latines de L'Algérie (Latin Inscriptions from Algeria), Edouard Champion, Paris (1922–present).
- Inscriptiones Italiae (Inscriptions from Italy), Rome (1931-present).
