= Joseph Meifred =

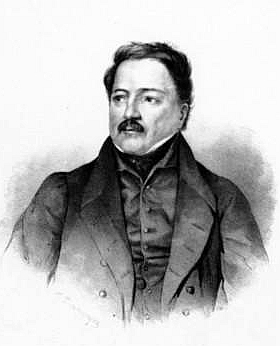
Pierre-Joseph-Émile Meifred

Joseph Meifred (1791–1867) was a hornist, pedagogue, and French horn designer. He studied at the Conservatoire de Paris with Louis-François Dauprat and won the first prize in horn performance in 1818. He later became a professor at the conservatory and taught until his retirement in 1864.

He obtained his technical background by graduating from the Arts et Métiers ParisTech engineering school.

One of his most enduring works is the Method for the chromatic horn, or horn with pistons (1840).
