= Alfred-Alexandre Quentin =

- Born: January 1, 1827
- Died: February 6, 1895 (aged 68)
- Occupation: Musician
- Instrument: Trombon

Alfred-Alexandre Quentin (1 January 1827 – 6 February 1895) was a French classical trombonist.

== Life ==
Born in Cherbourg-Octeville, Quentin entered the Conservatoire de Paris, in Antoine Dieppo's class. He won the second trombone prize at the 1856 competition, and the first prize the following year. At that time, he was a member of the Musard Concert Orchestra, and soon afterwards joined the Orchestre de l'Opéra national de Paris.

Under the title Orchestration, traité d’instrumentation (Paris, l’auteur, in- 8°), Quentin published a manual intended above all, in his thinking, to make composers familiar with the knowledge of copper instruments used in the composition of symphony orchestras.

Quentin died in the 10th arrondissement of Paris at the age of 68.

== Sources ==
- François-Joseph Fétis, Arthur Pougin, Biographie universelle des musiciens et bibliographie générale de la musique, Paris, Firmin-Didot, 1881, p. 378.
