= Ferling =

Ferling is the surname of the following people

- Franz Wilhelm Ferling (1796–1874), German musician
- Bernadett Ferling (born 1977), Hungarian handball player
- Holly Ferling (born 1995), Australian cricketer
- John E. Ferling (born 1940), American historian
- Lawrence Ferlinghetti (born Ferling, 1919–2021), American poet, painter and liberal activist
