= Briccialdi =

Briccialdi is an Italian surname and can refer to:

- Giulio Briccialdi (1818–1881), flautist and composer
- Briccialdi Flutes Italian flutes manufacturer
- 7714 Briccialdi, a main-belt asteroid named after Giulio Briccialdi
