= Lauri Ojala =

Finnish musician (1918–2002)

Lauri Fritjof Ojala (22 September 1918 – 6 July 2002) was a Finnish trumpeter.

== Life and career ==
He studied in Helsinki conservatory (nowadays Sibelius Academy) and got his qualification in 1938.

In 1947, Ojala participated in an international trumpet competition in Geneva. He tied the victory with Belgian André Marchal even though Ojala was forced to play a C trumpet song composed for the competition with his old B trumpet, thus having to transpose through the whole song.

In 1950, Ojala won an international trumpet competition which was organized by WCBS in New York City. Ojala qualified from 82 contestants to compete in the five contestant-final round and got the victory by playing Flight of the Bumblebee and Carnival of Venice.
