= Carnival of Venice (song) =

1829 song based on a Neapolitan folk tune

Carnival of Venice
Carnival of Venice by Ray Adams

The "Carnival of Venice" is based on a Neapolitan folk tune called "O Mamma, Mamma Cara" and popularized by violinist and composer Niccolò Paganini, who wrote twenty variations on the original tune. He titled it "Il Carnevale Di Venezia," Op. 10. In 1829, he wrote to a friend, "The variations I've composed on the graceful Neapolitan ditty, 'O Mamma, Mamma Cara,' outshine everything. I can't describe it."

Since then, the tune has been used for a number of popular songs, such as "If You Should Go to Venice" and "My Hat, It Has Three Corners" (or in German, Mein Hut, der hat drei Ecken). Also the English version of "A dog, he stole a sausage"

A series of theme and variations has been written for solo cornet, as "show off" pieces that contain virtuoso displays of double and triple tonguing, and fast tempos.

Since Paganini, many variations on the theme have been written, most notably those by Jean-Baptiste Arban, Del Staigers, Herbert L. Clarke for the cornet, trumpet, and euphonium, Francisco Tárrega and Johann Kaspar Mertz for classical guitar, Ignace Gibsone and Louis Moreau Gottschalk for piano, and Giovanni Bottesini for double bass. Chopin's "Souvenir de Paganini", dedicated to the composer and violin virtuoso Niccolò Paganini, is another variation on this theme. The popular novelty song, "(How Much Is) That Doggie in the Window?", written and recorded in 1952, is based on the tune.

The piece has also been arranged for tuba, notably played by John Fletcher and available on the CD The Best of Fletch. Also Roger Bobo on Tuba Libera (cd). Other tubists whose performances of the piece are noteworthy include Øystein Baadsvik, and Patrick Sheridan.

Dick Manning and Buddy Kaye wrote a popular song based on "Carnival of Venice," named "A Carnival in Venice," recorded by The Mills Brothers in 1954.

== Arrangements ==
Carnival of Venice, variations on the folk song composed by Julius Benedict, arranged for banjo and played on banjo by Alfred A. Farland.

Carnival of Venice, variations on the folk song composed by Julius Benedict, arranged/played on violin by Jan Rudenyi.

Carnival of Venice - played by Herbert L. Clarke on cornet, solo with orchestra - arranged by Clarke.

Carnival of Venice - ocarina played by Mosé Tapiero

- Jean-Baptiste Arban (1825–1889): Variations on 'Carnival of Venice' (for trumpet or cornet)
- Nicolas-Charles Bochsa Le Carnaval de Venise for pedal harp
- Giovanni Bottesini Introduction and Variations on Carnival of Venice (for double bass)
- Giulio Briccialdi Carnival of Venice for flute and orchestra Op.77
- Ernesto Cavallini Carnival of Venice (E♭ Clarinet or any other E♭ instrument)
- Charles Dancla The Carnival of Venice (for violin)
- Wilhelm Posse Variationen über der Karneval von Venedig (for harp)
- Heinrich Wilhelm Ernst (1812–1865) Le carnaval de Venise (for violin)
- Félix Godefroid Carnaval de Venise pour harpe
- Louis Moreau Gottschalk Le carnaval de Venise (Grand caprice et variations) (for piano)
- Elgar Howarth: The Carnival of Venice Variations (for Brass Ensemble)
- Adrien-François Servais: Fantaisie Burlesque sur le Carnaval de Venise, op. 9 (for cello)
- Paul Jeanjean (1874–1928): Venice Carnival (for clarinet)
- Bob McChesney Variations on 'Carnival of Venice' for Trombone
- Carlo Munier for mandolin and guitar
- Paganini: Il carnevale di Venezia (for violin: Scordatura comes in: Tune the Violin up a Half Step)
- Francisco Tárrega (1852–1909): Variations on Carnival of Venice (for guitar)
- Eduardo Zerega Le Carnival de Venise pour mandoline et piano
- Franz Liszt Variations sur Le Carnaval de Venise (for piano)
- Frederick Hemke The Carnival Of Venice (Introduction and Variations: opus posthumous) (for E♭ alto saxophone)
- Paul Génin Carnaval de Venise (Opus 14, fantasia and variations for flute and orchestra)

== Recorded versions ==
- "(The) Carnival of Venice", Arban, arr. James. Harry James and His Orchestra (Columbia 36004) 1941
- "Carnival of Venice", arr. Paganini, Zino Francescatti (Violin), Arthur Balsam (Piano) 1954
- "Carnival of Venice", Hank Snow guitar solo 1956
- "Carnival of Venice", arr. Frosini, Danny Kaye 1960
- "Carnival of Venice", arr. Tony Mottola, Tony Mottola And His Orchestra 1962
- "Carnival of Venice", arr. Jean Rolle, The Waikikis Netherlands 1963
- "Carnival of Venice", arr. Al Hirt, Al Hirt from Live at Carnegie Hall (Al Hirt album) 1965
- "Carnival of Venice", arr. Tony Osborne, Tony Osborne's Three Brass Buttons 1968
- "Carnival of Venice, Goodnight Vienna" The Keith Newton Sound 1970
- "The Carnival of Venice Variations", arr. Elgar Howarth, Philip Jones Brass Ensemble 1975
- "Carnival of Venice", arr. Del Staigers, The Canadian Brass from The Village Band 1981
- "Variations Sur "Le Carnaval De Venise"", arr. Donald Hunsberger, from "Carnaval", Wynton Marsalis and Eastman Wind Ensemble, 1987 (CBS Masterworks MK 42137)
- "Carnival of Venice", arr. Johnny Lo Piccolo for accordion Australia
- "Carnaval de Venise", Victor Massé La Reine Topaze Sumi Jo and English Chamber Orchestra 1994

== Film/TV appearances ==
- 1955 The Honeymooners – In the episode, Young Man with a Horn (#1.26), Alice finds Ralph's old cornet in the bedroom closet. Ralph remembers lost career chances, and feels discouraged. The song Ralph attempts to play on the cornet is "Carnival of Venice".
- 1992 Arizona Dream - It plays during the cadillac dream sequence Axel has while driving to Arizona with Paul.
- 2013 The Devil's Violinist

It was also used as theam music for the BBC series of steplejack Fred Dibnah around 1990
