= Franz Wilhelm Ferling =

German oboist, composer, and clarinetist

- Born: 20 September 1796; Halberstadt
- Died: 18 December 1874 (aged 78); Braunschweig
- Occupations: Oboist, composer, clarinetist
- Children: 2

Franz Wilhelm Ferling (20 September 1796 – 8 December 1874) was a German oboist, composer, and clarinettist. An accomplished musician, he is chiefly remembered today for his 48 études for oboe, op. 31, which are commonly studied by oboists and saxophonists.

== Life ==
Ferling was born in Halberstadt on 20 September 1796. At the age of 18, Ferling began serving as a court musician for the Duke of Brunswick, a position which he would hold for most of his life. From 1814 to 1816, he was a military musician, playing the clarinet. Afterwards, he received a job as the principal oboist of the Brunswick court orchestra, a post which he held for 44 years. There, Ferling played a wide variety of styles of music, including bel canto, Romantic music, and sacred music.

On 1 November 1858 Ferling filed a petition for pension during his forthcoming retirement, citing persistent rheumatism and impairments in the functioning of his lungs:

I believe to have given full satisfaction throughout the time of my service, but feel no longer able to do so. Owing to my 44-year service as an oboe player, my lungs are so seriously affected that I am no longer capable of blowing sustained tones, and in addition I frequently suffer from severe bouts of rheumatism which I caught in the performance of my duty at the theatre; this is one more reason for my inability to faithfully meet my obligations.

Ferling was granted pension on full salary, which came into effect on 1 January 1859. The only condition of this arrangement was that Ferling would play occasionally if required. Ferling died in Brunswick on 18 December 1874. Ferling had two sons; Gustav (b. 1835), a pianist and oboist, and Robert (1843-1881), who worked at the Staatstheater Stuttgart and was a court musician to Alexander II of Russia.

== Work ==
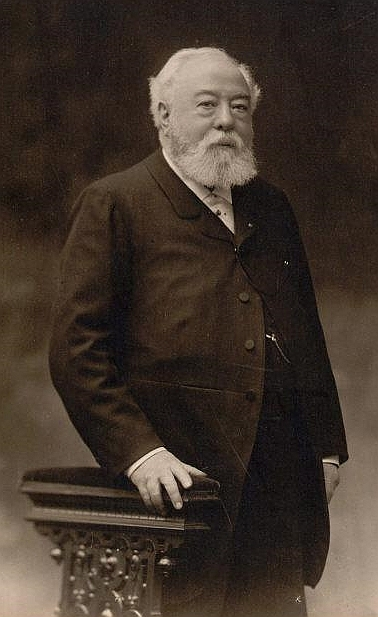
Cyrille Rose adapted 32 of Ferling's études for the clarinet.

Ferling is remembered today for his collection of 48 Exercises for Oboe, Op. 31, which are commonly studied by oboists and saxophonists. Published in 1840, there is a complete draft of the studies that dates from 1835, currently housed in the British Library. The 48 studies consist of two études in each key—one slow and the other fast. The études are written in a variety of musical styles: there are five bel canto exercises, six romances, two offertories, four toccatas in the style of Niccolò Paganini, three slow movements, seven marches, twelve waltzes, four polkas, two polonaises, and three czardas. After the études were published, Cyrille Rose, a French clarinetist, adapted 32 of Ferling's etudes for the clarinet, often transposing the music or changing the meter, articulation, or dynamics. In addition, Rose occasionally omitted some of Ferling's phrases or composed new ones.

After the first edition was published in 1840, oboist Louis Bleuzet republished the études in the early 20th century. Later, Southern Music, under the direction of Albert Andraud, edited and republished Bleuzet's version in an edition that was marketed for "oboe or saxophone". Marcel Mule also incorporated Ferling's exercises into his own teaching, publishing a version later, although it is unknown whether Mule or Andraud first suggested the studies's use for the saxophone. Meanwhile, oboists continued to study the exercises, with John de Lancie teaching Ferling as one of four étude books (the others being the works of Apollon Barret, Henri Brod, and Georges Gillet. In a conversation with de Lancie, oboist and editor Martin Schuring discussed whether or not the études originally had bass lines, leading Schuring to investigate into the earlier editions of the exercises. While finding that the études never had bass lines, Schuring noticed discrepancies between the original and modern editions. Because of this, he set out to publish an edition that was closer to the original, a project which Alfred Music distributed.

In addition to publishing several other exercises for oboe, Ferling wrote a double concerto for two oboes, which was discovered in a library in the Strahov district of Prague. The work was premiered in 2001 at the annual International Double Reed Society conference. In addition, Ferling composed a clarinet concerto, but it is a lost work, as only fragments remain.

== Selected compositions ==
The selected compositions of Ferling are:

- Concertino for Oboe and Orchestra, Op. 5 (1820s)
- Divertissement for Oboe quintet, Op. 6 (n.d.)
- Concerto for Oboe and Orchestra, Op. 8 (1832)
- 18 Exercises for Oboe, Op. 12 (n.d.)
- 3 Duos Concertantes for 2 Oboes, Op. 13 (n.d.)
- 3 Double concertos for 2 Oboes (n.d.)
- Das Jubiläum, pantomime ballet (1839)
- 48 Exercises for Oboe, Op. 31 (1840)

Oboe Study No 28

Oboe Study No 28
