= Chvalkovice (Vyškov District) =

- Municipality
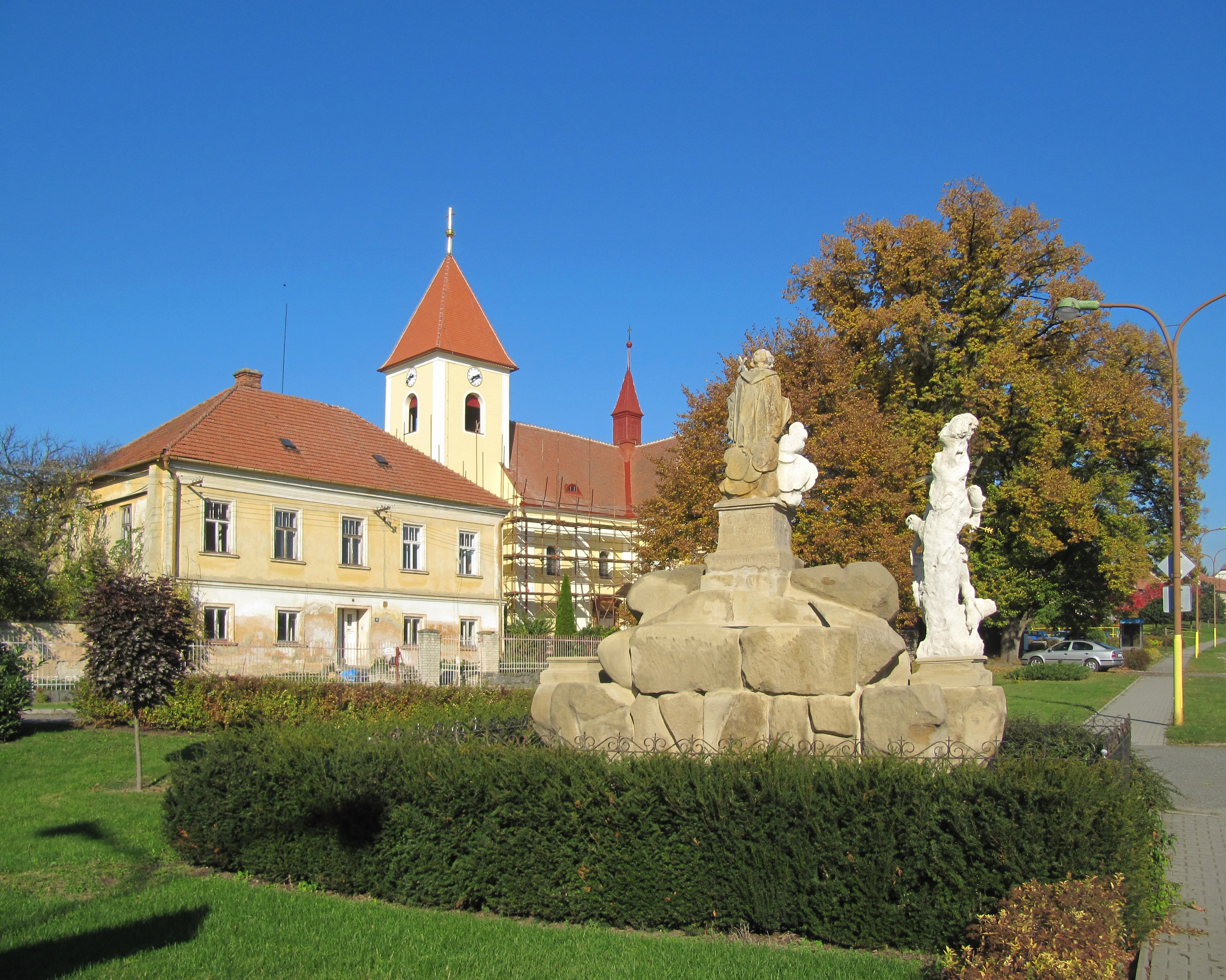
- Centre of Chvalkovice

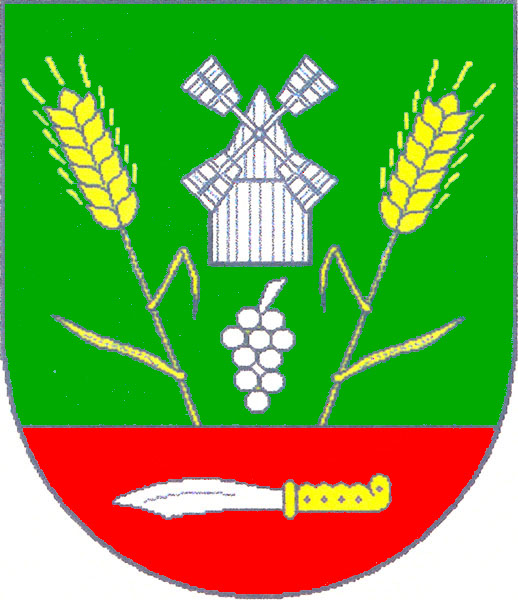
- Flag Coat of arms

- Location in the Czech Republic
- Coordinates: 49°11′13″N 17°6′36″E
- Country: Czech Republic
- Region: South Moravian
- District: Vyškov
- First mentioned: 1358

Area
  - Total: 6.94 km^{2} (2.68 sq mi)
- Elevation: 337 m (1,106 ft)

Population (2026-01-01)
  - Total: 282
  - Density: 40.6/km^{2} (105/sq mi)
- Time zone: UTC+1 (CET)
  - Summer (DST): UTC+2 (CEST)
- Postal code: 683 41
- Website: www.chvalkovice.eu

Chvalkovice is a municipality and village in Vyškov District in the South Moravian Region of the Czech Republic. It has about 300 inhabitants.

Chvalkovice lies approximately 12 kilometres (7 mi) south-east of Vyškov, 36 km (22 mi) east of Brno, and 218 km (135 mi) south-east of Prague.

== Demographics ==
Historical population
Year	Pop.	±%
1869	531	—
1880	591	+11.3%
1890	611	+3.4%
1900	597	−2.3%
1910	598	+0.2%
1921	625	+4.5%
1930	559	−10.6%
1950	455	−18.6%
1961	487	+7.0%
1970	425	−12.7%
1980	352	−17.2%
1991	281	−20.2%
2001	244	−13.2%
2011	262	+7.4%
2021	257	−1.9%
Source: Censuses

== Notable people ==
- Andreas Nemetz (1799–1846), bandmaster and composer
