= Giovanni Cifolelli =

Italian composer

Giovanni Cifolelli was an Italian mandolin virtuoso and dramatic composer whose date and place of birth are unknown.

In 1764, he made his appearance in Paris as a mandolin virtuoso and was highly esteemed, both as a performer and teacher. He published his Method for the mandolin while residing in Paris, which met with great success throughout France, being the most popular of its period.

His chief works were the operas L'Italienne and Pierre et Lucette, the former being an opera bouffe in one act (with the storyline or libretto by Nicolas-Étienne Framery). These works were commissioned by the Comedie Italienne, Paris, and were produced at this theatre successfully, in 1770 and 1774. Several of the songs and duets in Pierre and Lucette were exceedingly popular in France, and they were republished in Paris in 1775 and 1780.

== Works ==
- L'Italienne : comédie en 1 acte, mêlée d'ariettes (Paris, 1770)
- Pierre et Lucette, comédie en deux actes et en prose mêlée d'ariettes (Paris, 1774)
- Airs détachés de Perin et Lucette, comédie en deux actes, mêlées d'ariettes par M. Davesne (Paris, 1775)
- Ariette nouvelle avec accompagnement de deux violons et basse
- Non, laisse moi, laisse moi, Lucas. Duo (1775)
