= Aurélio Magnani =

Italian composer (1856–1921)

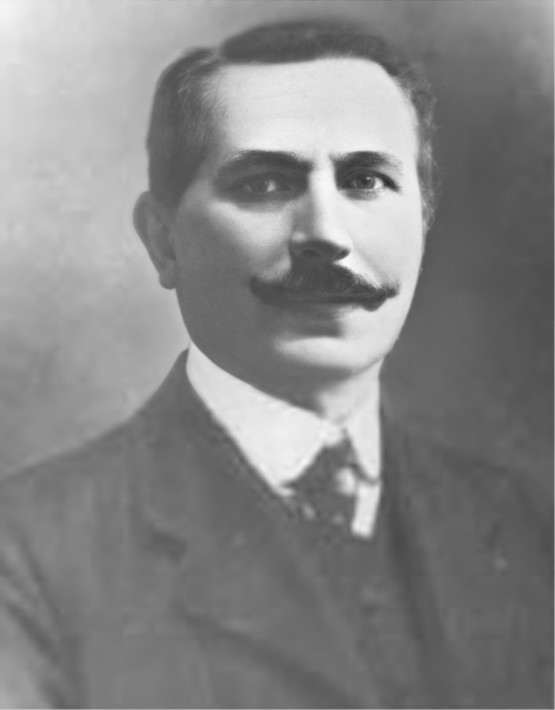

Aurelio Magnani (1856 – 1921) was an Italian teacher of and performer on the clarinet.

Magnani taught in Venice and Rome, and wrote a clarinet method book which he dedicated to Cyrille Rose of the Paris Opera. One of his compositions, a Mazurka Caprice, can be heard on reissues of historical recordings by Louis Cahuzac. According to the liner notes from these recordings, the work is "pure charm throughout, and shows the craftsmanship of someone who knows the clarinet intimately."

== Discography ==
- Piero Vincenti (clarinet) - Marsida Koni (piano). Aurelio Magnani, Complete works for clarinet and piano, Accademia Italiana del Clarinetto AIC 001 © 2010
- Louis Cahuzac. Les grands maîtres da la Clarinette, Mazurka-caprice, Dante Productions LYS 366 (p) 1998
- Louis Cahuzac. Historical Recordings, Volume II, Mazurka-caprice, Clarinet Classics CC0010 © 1994, (p) 1994
