= Andreas Nemetz =

Andreas Nemetz (14 November 1799, Chvalkovice – 21 August 1846, Vienna) was a bandmaster and composer, and writer of teaching works for brass instruments.

== Life ==
Nemetz was born in the village of Chvalkovice in Moravia (now in the Czech Republic), in modest circumstances, and showed interest in music at an early age. He was educated at the local school, and at Kroměříž where he increased his knowledge of music. He was a teacher for some time in Sopron, then moved to Vienna, where for five years he was trombonist at the Royal Court Theatre. From 1828 he was bandmaster of the Infanterie-Regiment Landgraf Hessen-Homburg Nr. 19; he remained in this post until his death in Vienna in 1846.

== Works ==
Nemetz composed dances and marches for military band.

He wrote teaching works, published by Diabelli:

- Allgemeine Musik-Schule für Militärmusik ("General music-school for military band")
- Hornschule für das einfache, das Maschinen- und das Signalhorn (for horn)
- Neueste Trompetenschule (for trumpet)
- Neueste Posaunenschule (for trombone)
