= Julius Weissenborn =

German bassoonist, teacher and composer (1837–1888)

Christian Julius Weissenborn (April 13, 1837 – April 21, 1888) was a German bassoonist, teacher and composer.

== Biography ==
Weissenborn was born in Friedrichs-Tanneck near Eisenberg, Thuringia. He was principal bassoonist of the Leipzig Gewandhaus Orchestra from 1857 to 1887. He taught at the Leipzig Conservatory beginning in 1882. Apart from a small canon of Romantic works, he is chiefly remembered for his pedagogical works, the Practical Bassoon School and the Bassoon Studies, Op. 8 (which includes the "Fifty Advanced Studies"), which are still in widespread use. He died, aged 51, in Leipzig.

== Music ==
The Practical Bassoon School (called "Practical Method for the Bassoon" in the American editions) consists primarily of 25 sets of exercises that gradually increase in difficulty, from the most elementary level to intermediate. Following this there is a brief introduction to the tenor clef and a fairly detailed discussion of various ornaments, with a 26th section applying these concepts.

The Bassoon Studies, Op. 8 is published in two parts. The first part is subtitled "For Beginners" and consists of several sections:

1. Essential Kinds of Expression (Tenuto, Legato, Staccato, Portato, Dynamics, Accents);
2. The Tenor Clef (brief);
3. Scale Exercises in All Keys;
4. Arpeggios and chords;
5. Chromatic scales;
6. Thirds, Fourths, Sixths, Octaves and Tenths;
7. Embellishments

The second part is the famous "Fifty Advanced Studies" that many bassoonists are required to learn during their formative years. While some of these are at an intermediate level, most of them are quite challenging, exploring all keys and even the extreme ranges of the bassoon.

Other works:

- Op. 3: Romance
- Op. 4: Six Bassoon Trios
- Op. 9: Six Recital Pieces (Vortragsstücke): Arioso; Humoreske; Adagio; Notturno; Scherzo; Ballade)
- Op. 10: Three Recital Pieces: Song Without Words; Romanze; Elegie
- Op. 14 Capriccio

== Media ==
Six Trios for 3 Bassoons, Op. 4
1. Serenade

2. Polonaise

3. Polka ("Tea dance in the little country manor")

4. Scherzo alla Mazurka ("Dance in the village pub")

5. Turkish March ("Midnight parade of the Guard")

6. Funebre March ("A humorist's last hour")
Performed by Arthur Grossman, Terry Ewell, and Bruce Grainger
