= Tyrolienne =

Tyrolean folk dance/French word

The tyrolienne is a type of Tyrolean folk dance. Additionally, it is the French word for "ziplining."
