= Jacques-François Gallay =

French horn player, academic and composer

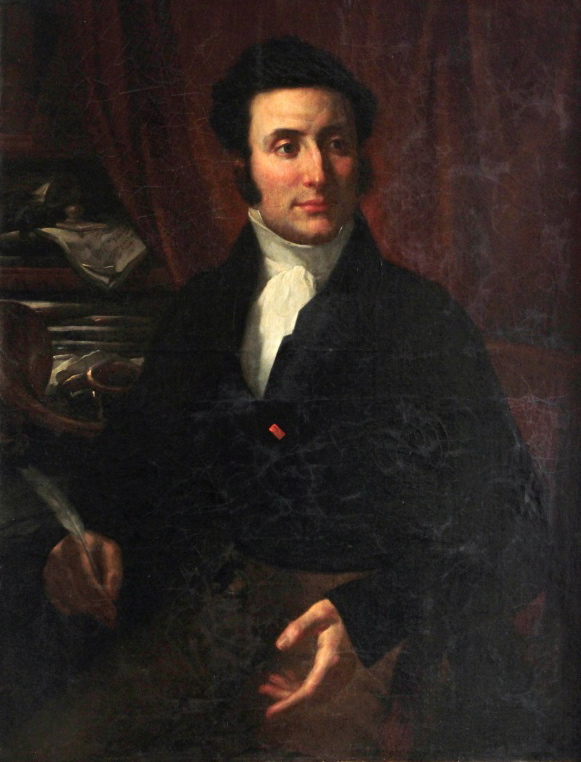
Jacques-François Gallay, by Antoine Maurin

Jacques-François Gallay (8 December 1795 – 18 October 1864) was a French horn player, academic and composer of music for the instrument. His Méthode for the natural horn was published in 1845.

== Life ==
Gallay was born in Perpignan, in the south of France, in 1795; his father was an amateur horn player. His ability was noted during his youth, but he was reluctant to travel to Paris to study. Eventually in 1820 he entered the Paris Conservatoire, and studied with the horn player Louis Francois Dauprat.

He played at the Théâtre-Italien in Paris from 1825, and was a member of the Chapelle royale at about this time. From 1832 he was a member of the band of King Louis Philippe I. He succeeded Dauprat as professor of the horn at the Conservatoire, remaining in the post until his death in 1864.

== Works ==
Gallay wrote Méthode pour le Cor (1845) for the natural horn. He wrote many études and other works for horn, including two horn concertos. His Préludes méasurés et non méasurés ("Measured and unmeasured preludes"), Op. 27, are notable.
