= Jacques de Gouy =

French composer

Jacques de Gouy (c. 1610 – after 1650) was a French Baroque composer of Dutch ancestry. He was acquainted with composers in Parisian music circles of the early 17th century such as Étienne Moulinié and Michel Lambert.

== Works ==
In his writings, de Gouy mentions having composed motets and airs, yet all of his published work is lost, save his Airs à quatre parties sur la Paraphrase des pseaumes de Godeau (1650), a setting of Antoine Godeau's Paraphrases, including a long and informative preface. De Gouy only published the first 50 of the 150 psalms, because the work was received as too academic.

De Gouy promoted Jean Le Maire's new system of notation, called "la musique almérique", by handing out engraved music scores to concert guests attending the premiere of Estrennes pour Messieurs et Dames du Concert de la Musique Almérique, presentée par M. Goüy premier professeur en icelle: en l'année 1642, a chanson in four parts specifically written for that occasion. He also published a learning method for plainchant according to Le Maire's system, Table en faveur des ecclésiastiques, pour apprendre facilement le plain-chant selon l’art de l’incomparable M. Le Maire, which is also lost.
