= François Dauverné =

François Georges Auguste Dauverné
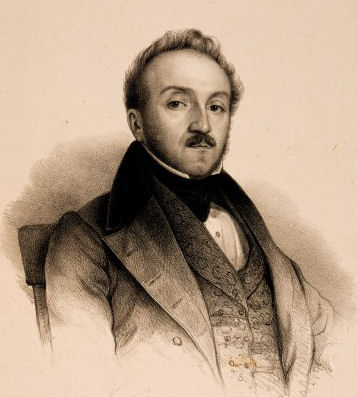

Background information
- Born: 16 February 1799; Paris, France
- Died: November 4, 1874 (aged 75); Paris, France
- Genres: Classical
- Occupation(s): Trumpeter, Teacher
- Instrument: Trumpet
- Years active: 1814–1869

François Georges Auguste Dauverné (16 February 1799 – 4 November 1874) was a French trumpeter who in 1827 was the first to use the new F three-valved trumpet in public performance. Dauverné was amongst the first to realise the potential of the newly invented valve trumpet after the arrival of a specimen, sent by Spontini from Prussia to Paris in 1826, and is credited with persuading several composers to write for it, the first three being Chélard (Macbeth, 1827), Berlioz (Waverley Overture, 1827) and Rossini (Guillaume Tell, 1829) (Tarr n.d.).

Aged 15 he entered the Musique des Gardes-du-Corps du Roi as trumpeter and was later first trumpeter in the orchestra of the Academie Royale de Musique. In 1833 he became the first trumpet teacher at the Conservatoire de Paris teaching both valved trumpet and natural trumpet where his most famous student was Jean-Baptiste Arban (Tarr n.d.).

François Dauverné retired from teaching on 1 January 1859 (Tarr n.d.) and died in Paris on 4 November 1874.
