= Antoine Dieppo =

French trombonist (1808–1878)

Antoine Dieppo (30 November 1808 – 16 February 1878) was a French trombonist.

== Life ==
Born in Amersfoort, Dieppo was a soloist at the Opéra-Comique and the Orchestre de la Société des Concerts du Conservatoire. He was much appreciated by Berlioz who highlighted the trombone in his compositions for him.

In 1833, Luigi Cherubini reopened the trombone class of the Conservatoire de Paris by entrusting it to Félix Vobaron and being directed by Dieppo.

A trombone class was created in 1794-1795 with the law of 16 Thermidor year 3 (3 August 1795). The musicians of the National Guard were then teachers. The class was then closed in 1802. A certain Pierre-François Marcillac was the last teacher.

Dieppo was professor of trombone at the Conservatoire de Paris from 1836 to 1871.

Dieppo lived in a period when the trombone was little recognized by composers. Despite the emergence of the symphony orchestra, composers made little use of it as a soloist: Beethoven gave it brief appearances, Mozart used it in his operas but never considered it a solo instrument (despite the solo of the Requiem).

After the reopening of the class in 1833, each teacher had his or her own working method, corresponding to the evolution of the trombone in their time. The Dieppo method is one of the first reference methods, copies of which can still be consulted today.

Dieppo died in Dijon at the age of 69.

== Sources ==
- A History of the Trombone / David M. Guion (Scarecrow Press, 2010) and source material used in writing it
- Trombone / Trevor Herbert (Yale University Press, 2006)
- French Music for Low Brass Instruments / J. Mark Thompson and Jeffrey Jon Lemke (University of Indiana Press, 1994)
- My Musical Life and Recollections / Jules Rivière (Sampson, Low, Marston, 1893)
