= Apollon Barret =

French oboist, teacher and composer

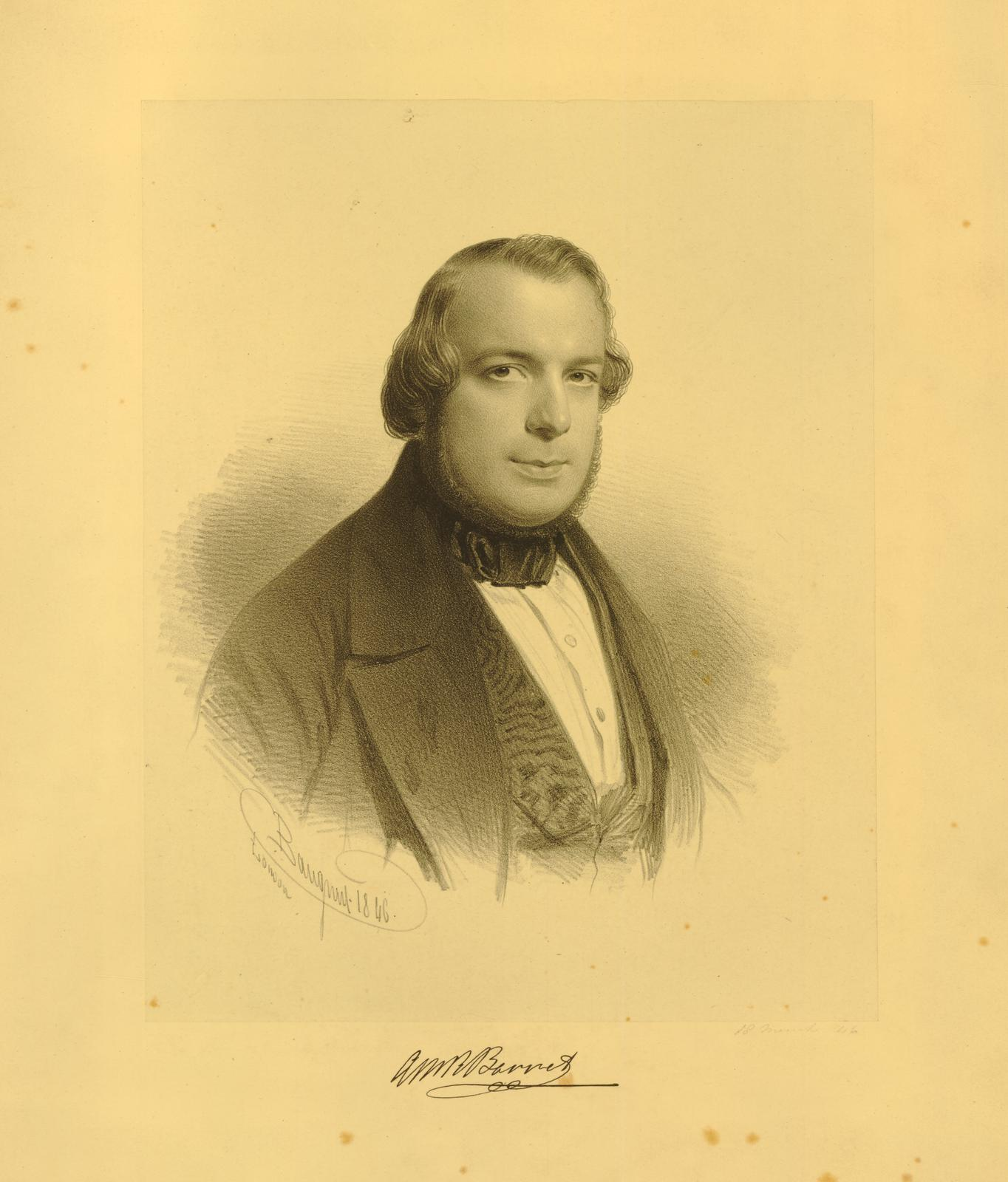

Apollon Marie-Rose Barret (1804 – 8 March 1879) was a French oboist, teacher, and composer, best known for his influential pedagogical work Complete Method for the Oboe. He spent much of his career in the United Kingdom.

== Life and career ==
Barret was born in 1804 in Saint-Brieuc, France. He studied at the Conservatoire de Paris under Gustave Vogt, where he was awarded the premier prix in 1824. He began his professional career performing with the Théâtre de l'Odéon and the Opéra-Comique in Paris.

In 1829, Barret moved to London, where he joined the orchestra of the King's Theatre. He became principal oboist there and later at the Royal Italian Opera (now the Royal Opera House), where he was appointed by conductor Michael Costa in 1847.

== Complete Method for the Oboe ==
In 1850, Barret published Complete Method for the Oboe, a comprehensive instructional manual covering fingering charts, ornamentation, scales, reed-making, exercises, and solo studies. The method included 40 progressive melodies, 15 grand studies, and several sonatas. It has remained a standard work in oboe education and has been reissued in several modern editions.

Barret is also noted for working with the Triébert family, prominent oboe makers, in the development of instrument improvements, including the addition of a low B♭ key and a thumb plate.

== Death ==
Barret retired in 1874 and returned to France. He died in Paris on 8 March 1879.
