= Quarante =

Quarante, France
- Commune
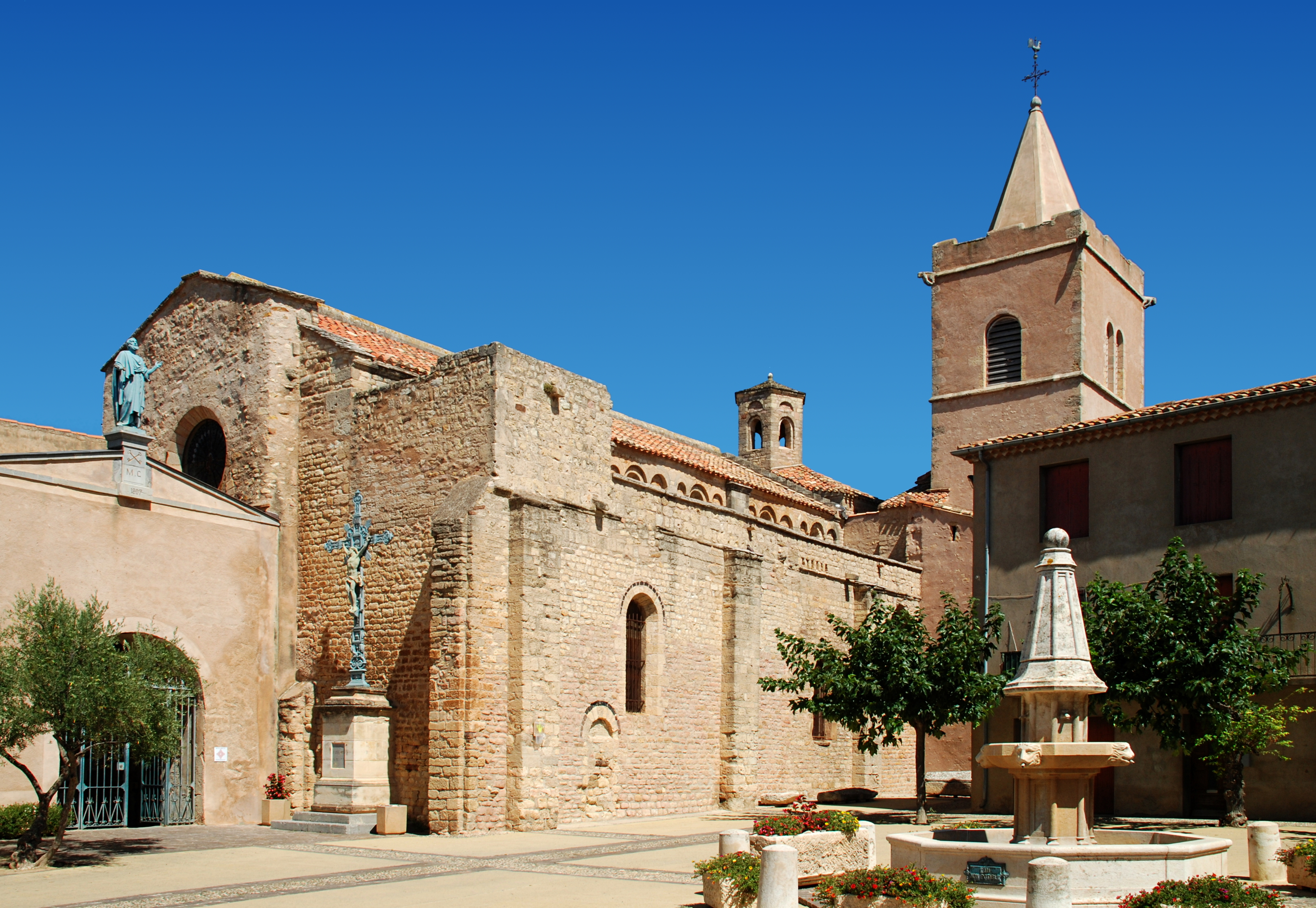
- Church Sainte-Marie

- Coat of arms
- Location of Quarante, France
- Location within France Location within Occitanie
- Coordinates: 43°20′51″N 2°57′47″E
- Country: France
- Region: Occitania
- Department: Hérault
- Arrondissement: Béziers
- Canton: Saint-Pons-de-Thomières
- Intercommunality: Sud-Hérault

Government
  - Mayor (2026–32): Serge Ortiz
- Area^{1}: 30.05 km^{2} (11.60 sq mi)
- Elevation: 115 m (377 ft)
- Highest elevation: 227 m (745 ft)
- Lowest elevation: 21 m (69 ft)
- Population (2023): 1,776
  - Density: 59.10/km^{2} (153.1/sq mi)
- Time zone: UTC+01:00 (CET)
  - Summer (DST): UTC+02:00 (CEST)
- INSEE/Postal code: 34226 /34310
- ^{1} French Land Register data, which excludes lakes, ponds, glaciers > 1 km^{2} (0.386 sq mi or 247 acres) and river estuaries.

Quarante, France (French pronunciation: [kaʁɑ̃t]; Occitan: Cranta) (pronounced kehr-aunt) is a commune in the Hérault department in the Occitanie region in the South of France. Quarante is a hilltop medieval village from the Gallo-Roman era, one of the 20 villages of the Saint-Chinian Wine Appellation. Just 1 km from the famous 17th century Canal du Midi, 8 km from Capestang, 25 km from Béziers, and 35 km from the Mediterranean Sea. The closest train station with service to Paris is in downtown Béziers or Narbonne, and the regional airport is Beziers Cap d'Agde near the Mediterranean Sea. International airports are; Montpellier one hour south, with Toulouse being two hours north.

Installed on a Roman oppidum, the town had a significant occupation during those times, as evidenced by the artifacts found and available for viewing in the local museum. The Sainte-Marie de Quarante Abbey, built in 902, is located in the town square. You can still see the original rempart walls, towers and prison in the ancient town center on the stone roads from the 12th to 14th centuries on Rue des Remparts and Rue des Bichettes. These narrow streets in the Old Town are steeped in Templar history. Quarante has had a relatively peaceful history over the centuries, mainly focused on wine, olive, and almond production which is still relevant today. Quiet, with light to no tourism, the village seduces by its proximity to some of the most beautiful cities of the region, but also by its natural and preserved environment. This area boasts over 300 days of sunshine a year, perfect for the local vineyards and groves. The village has a school, bakery, butcher, small grocery, pizza take-out, bar and restaurant, wine tasting, hair salons, B&B, gites, doctor, pharmacy and post office. Postal code is 34310.

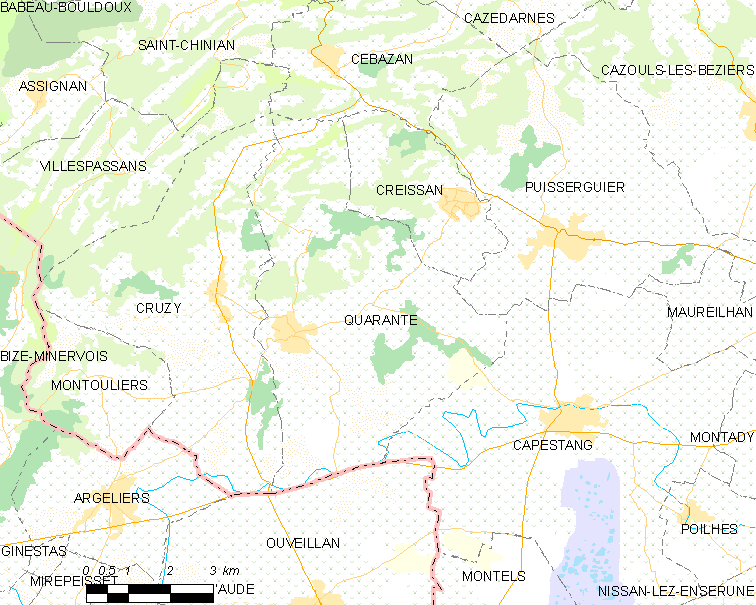
Map

== Population ==
Historical population
Year	Pop.	±% p.a.
1968	1,644	—
1975	1,460	−1.68%
1982	1,441	−0.19%
1990	1,509	+0.58%
1999	1,449	−0.45%
2007	1,561	+0.94%
2012	1,634	+0.92%
2017	1,767	+1.58%
2023	1,776	+0.08%
Source: INSEE

== See also ==
- Communes of the Hérault department
