= Jean-Baptiste Arban =

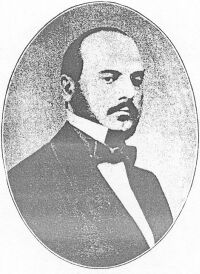

Background information
- Born: 28 February 1825; Lyon, France
- Died: 8 April 1889 (aged 64) Paris, France
- Genre: Romantic
- Occupations: Cornetist, Teacher, Conductor
- Instrument: Cornet
- Years active: 1845–1888

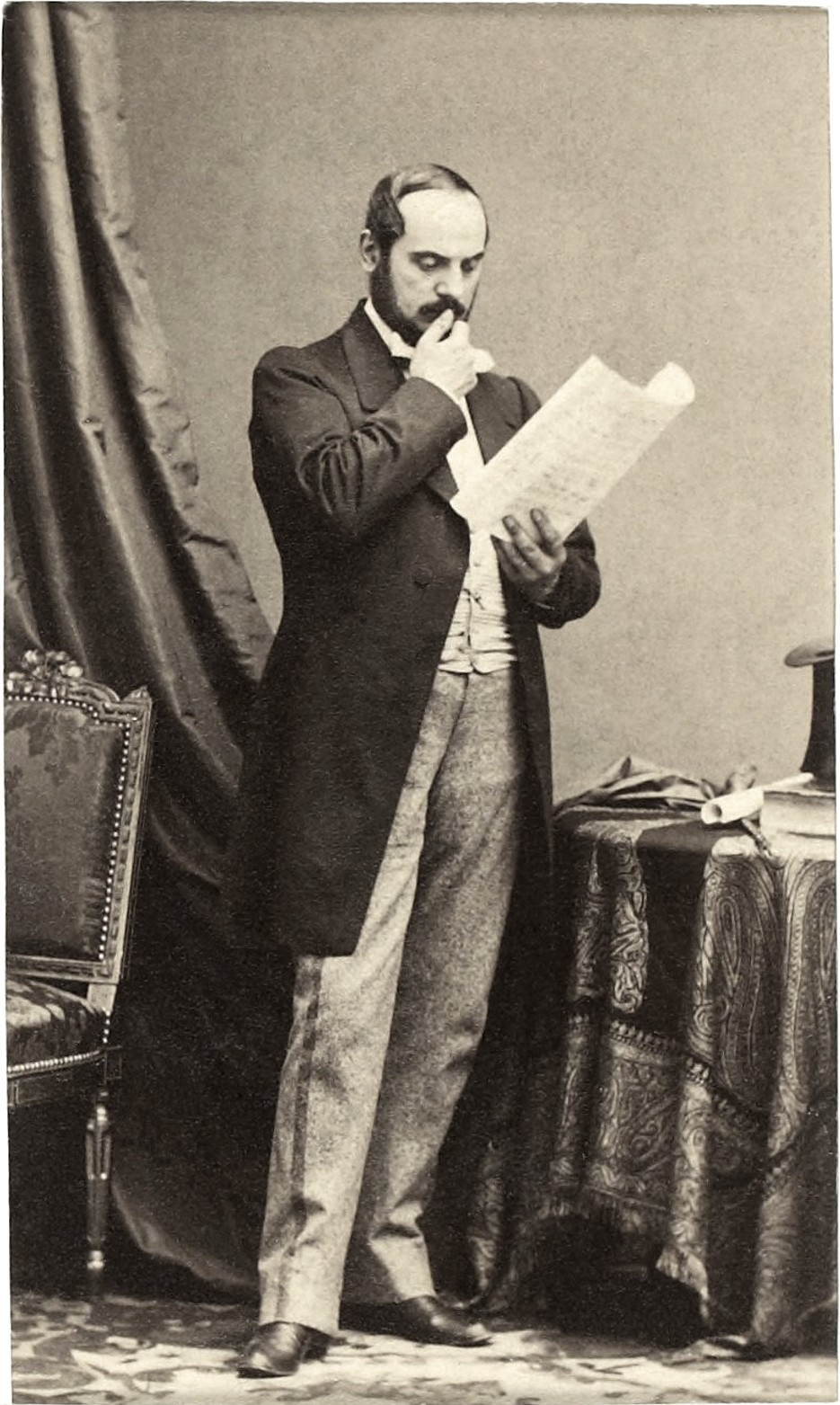
Jean-Baptiste Arban

Joseph Jean-Baptiste Laurent Arban (28 February 1825 – 8 April 1889) was a cornetist, conductor, composer, pedagogue and the first famed virtuoso of the cornet à piston or valved cornet. He was influenced by Niccolò Paganini's virtuosic technique on the violin and successfully proved that the cornet was a true solo instrument by developing virtuoso technique on the instrument.

He is best known for his instruction manual, Arban's Complete Conservatory Method for Trumpet, which has been updated over the years, and is still widely used.

Arban was born one year before the successful creation of the piston-valved cornet. He worked with determination to give this new instrument stature in music. His efforts succeeded when the cornet became "the most popular brass instrument of the 19th century".

== Life ==
Arban was born in Lyon, France, one of ten children of Simon Arban, artificier. An older brother was the balloonist Francisque Arban.

He studied trumpet with François Dauverné at the Paris Conservatoire from 1841 to 1845. After graduating from the conservatory with honors, Arban began to master the cornet. He was appointed professor of saxhorn at the École Militaire in 1857, and became professor of cornet at the Paris Conservatoire in 1869, where Merri Franquin was among his students.

In 1864, he published his influential Grande méthode complète pour cornet à pistons et de saxhorn. The title of the updated English language translation is, Arban's Complete Conservatory Method for Trumpet.

In 1876, at the invitation of Alexander II, Arban conducted some concerts in Pavlovsk.

Arban apparently made a phonograph cylinder recording for the Edison Company shortly before his death. In the Finnish newspaper Hufvudstadsbladet (no. 96, of 11 April 1890, page 2), Arban's recording is mentioned: "Among the phonograms a particular one must be mentioned: solo on cornet à piston, played by the famous French virtuoso monsieur Arban called 'Fanfare d'Edison'."

Arban died in Paris.

Arban's Complete Celebrated Method for the Cornet (1893)

== The Arban method book ==
Arban's cornet method book, first published in Paris in 1864, is often referred to as the "Trumpeter's Bible". It is still studied by modern brass players. It is available by various publishers, with Carl Fischer and Alphonse Leduc being the most prominent. In 1982 Carl Fischer released a version that is annotated by Claude Gordon, noted pedagogue. The 1982 Carl Fischer version restores the original text and designates the previous revisions by Walter Smith and Edwin Franko Goldman. Then, Claude Gordon makes comments in the footnotes for clarification and cross referencing supporting material.

Arban's "Variations on Carnival of Venice" remains one of the great showpieces for cornet soloists today. Arban's variations are based on a Neapolitan folk tune called "O Mamma, Mamma Cara", which was popularized by violinist and composer Niccolò Paganini, who also wrote and performed variations on it.

"Fantasie Brilliante" also continues to be frequently performed and recorded.
