= Paul Génin =

French flautist and composer

Paul-Agricole Génin (14 February 1832, in Avignon – 22 December 1903, in Paris) was a French flautist and composer for flute. He was a student of Louis Dorus and became first flute at the Théâtre-Italien (Comédie-Italienne) Paris.

He is sometime confused with Pierre Génin, another flautist who emigrated to England.

== Compositions and arrangements ==
Carnaval de Venise opus 14, fantasia and variations for flute and orchestra. A reduction also exists for flute and piano.

Fantasia on Themes from Verdi's "La Traviata", for flute and harp.

Fantaisie sur "Faust" de Gounod No.1, for flute and piano.
