= Cyrille Rose =

French clarinetist

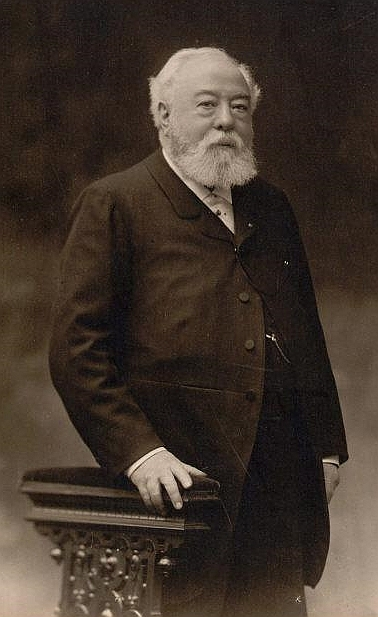
Cyrille Rose by Pierre Petit, 1880

Chrysogone Cyrille Rose (born on 13 February 1830 in Lestrem, Pas-de-Calais and died on 1902 in Meaux) was an acclaimed French clarinetist, and served as principal clarinet at the Paris Opera. He was a teacher and composer of pedagogical material for the clarinet, much of which is still widely in use today.

Cyrille's teacher was Hyacinthe Klosé. He studied under Klosé at the Paris Conservatoire, winning the First Prize in its Annual Concours in 1847.

He taught many famous clarinet players, such as Louis Cahuzac, Paul Jeanjean, Manuel and Francisco Gomez, Henri Lefèbvre, Henri Paradis, and Henri and Alexandre Selmer.
