= Paul Jeanjean =

French composer (1874–1928)

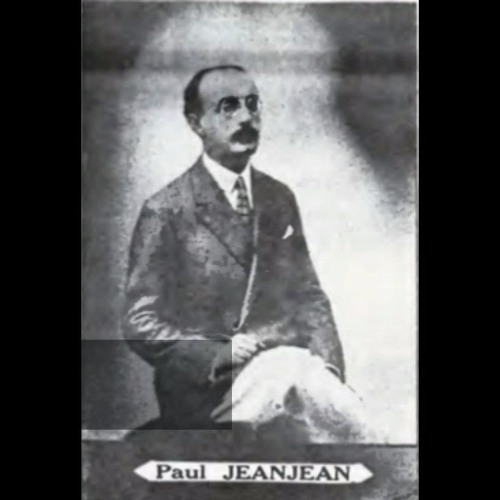
Paul Jeanjean

Paul Prudent Jeanjean (1874 – 1928) was a French composer and principal clarinetist of the Garde Republicaine Band and the Monte Carlo Casino. While known primarily for his clarinet compositions, he also composed for other instruments, such as the bassoon and cornet. He studied with one of the most important clarinet teachers, Cyrille Rose.

His compositions for the clarinet are mainly studies for the practice of technical elements.

Every year, the Paris Conservatoire would call on the clarinet teachers to compose music for that of their own use and also for their students. As a result we now have many sets of studies for the clarinet.

== Works ==
His works include:

- 18 études de Perfectionnement
- 16 Etudes Modernes
- 3 Books of 20 Etudes in each known as Etudes Progressives et Melodiques
- 25 "Technical and Melodic Etudes," in 2 volumes
- 'Vade-Mecum' for the Clarinet Player, 6 Special Studies
- Au clair de la lune
- Arabesques
- Clair matin
