= Louis François Dauprat =

French horn player, composer, and professor (1781–1868)

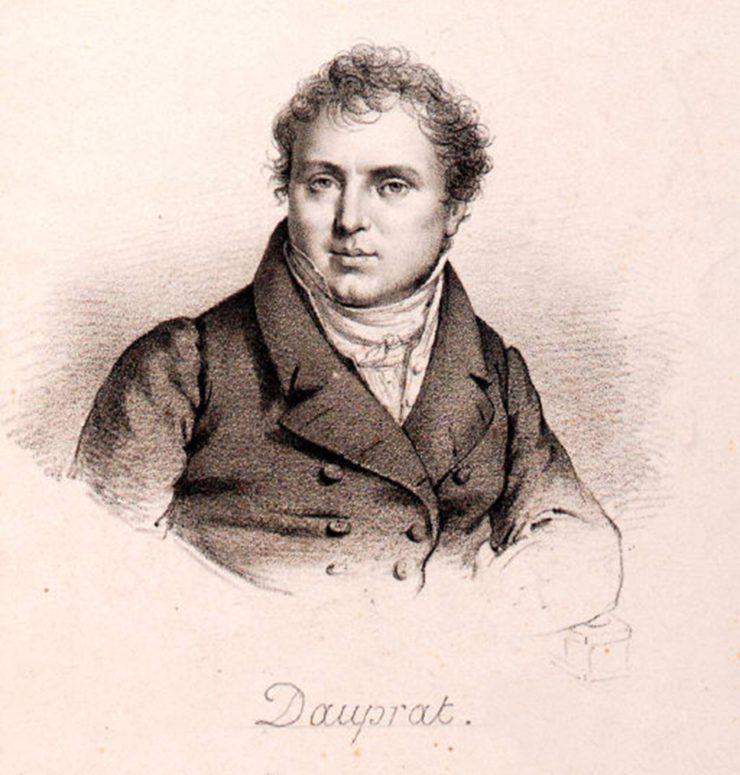
- An engraving of Dauprat, c. 1800
- Born: 24 May 1781; Paris, France
- Died: 16 July 1868 (aged 87); Paris, France
- Education: Conservatoire de Paris
- Occupations: Musician; composer; professor
- Years active: 1800s–1842
- Employers: Conservatoire de Paris; Paris Opera Orchestra
- Notable work: Méthode pour cor alto et cor basse (1824)
- Musical career
- Instruments: Natural horn; horn

Louis François Dauprat (24 May 1781 – 16 July 1868) was a French composer, horn player, and professor at the Conservatoire de Paris. He played and taught natural horn only, but was also very interested in the first experiments with keyed horns. He successfully ensured the development of a distinctively French school of playing, marginally influenced by the invention of the valve horn.

== Biography ==
Born in Paris, Dauprat first studied at the Conservatoire de Paris with Johann Joseph Kenn, and in 1795, setting up in his horn class where he won the 1798 "Premier Prix". As a prize, he was awarded an experimental horn model made by Lucien Joseph Raoux's studio, now one of the most impressive pieces in the museum of the Paris Conservatory.

From 1806 to 1808, he was the principal hornist in the orchestra of the Grand Théâtre de Bordeaux, and from 1808 to 1811, he worked for the Paris Opera Orchestra and the Conservatoire de Paris. He succeeded his teacher as professor in the Conservatory and held that position until 1842 when he was succeeded by the famous solo horn player (and his own former student) Jacques-François Gallay.

Dauprat wrote the textbook Méthode pour cor alto et cor basse (Paris, 1824), which is of much historical and methodological interest, and wrote five concertos for horn and orchestra and various compositions for chamber ensembles.

He died in Paris.

== Works ==
- 1st Horn Concerto, Op. 1
- Sonata for Horn and Harp, Op. 2
- 3 Quintets for Horn and String Quartet, Op. 6
- 2nd Horn Concerto, Op. 9
- Sextet, for 6 Horns in different tunes, Op. 10
- Trio for 3 Horns and Piano or Orchestra, Op. 15
- 3rd Horn Concerto for Alto and Bass Horns, Op. 18
- 4th Horn Concerto Hommage a la Memoire de Punto, Op. 19
- 5th Horn Concerto for Alto and Bass Horns, Op. 21
- Mélodie, Op. 25
- Concertino for Horn Ensemble
- Six Quartets for 4 Horns
- Three Grand Trios for 3 Horns
- Six Trios for 3 Horns
- Several works for Horn and Piano
