= Giulio Briccialdi =

Italian composer

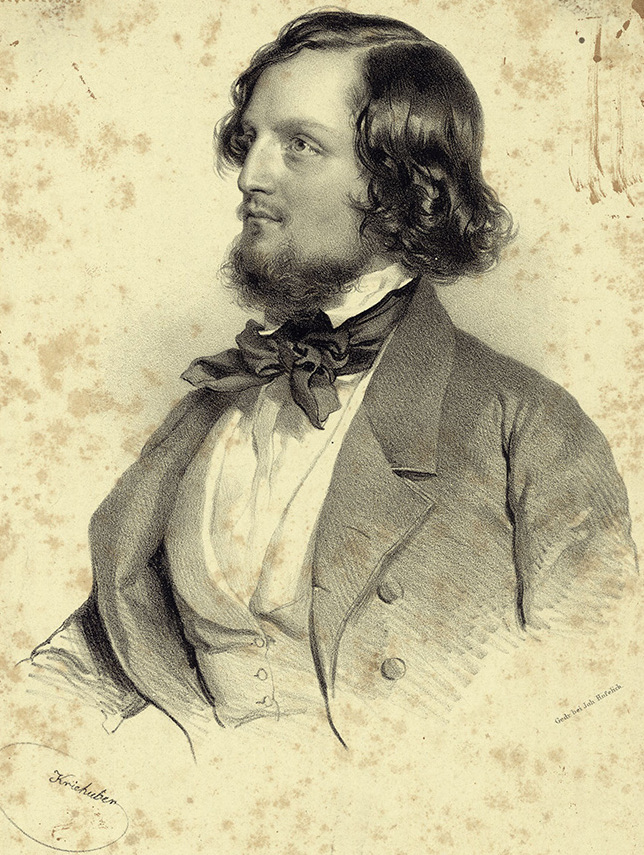
Giulio Briccialdi, 1842 portrait lithograph by Josef Kriehuber

Giulio Briccialdi (1/2 March 1818 – 17 December 1881) was an Italian virtuoso flautist and composer, a technical innovator on his instrument and a professor of music.

Briccialdi was born in Terni. He is commonly credited for inventing the B-flat (or "Briccialdi") thumb key for the Boehm flute, but scholarship suggests that the innovation was Boehm's first. He died in Florence.

== Biography ==
Briccialdi was born in Terni, Italy, in the Papal States on 2 March 1818 and began studying flute with his father. After his father's death, the 14-year-old Briccialdi moved to Rome to pursue a musical career and avoid family pressure to join the priesthood. His first appointment was to the Academia di Santa Cecilia in Rome at the age of 17.

While in Rome he studied composition and, in 1835, began teaching flute at the Accademia di Santa Cecilia. He then moved to Naples, where he was the flute teacher for the royal family.

Over the next couple of years he worked in Naples and Milan, and was flute teacher to the king's brother. Then in 1841 he toured Europe and America, finally settling in London the following year.

In London he became a director of the instrument making firm Rudall and Rose and was responsible for several mechanical developments which are still in use today. He was appointed professor of flute at the Conservatoire in Florence in 1870, and remained there until his death in 1881. In 1996 the asteroid N. 7714 was named in his memory.

Briccialdi was sometimes known as “the Paganini of the flute.”

== Works ==
- Andantino con variazioni, after Paganini, for flute & guitar
- Ballabile di Concerto, for flute & orchestra
- Canzonetta with variations for flute & piano in C major
- Capriccio on themes from "Ernani", Op. 28
- Capriccio on themes from "I Lombardi", Op. 30
- Carnival of Venice for flute & orchestra Op. 78
- Character Piece 1865
- Duo Concertante for 2 flutes in F major, Op. 100/2
- Elegie di Ernst, for flute & piano, Op. 26
- Fantasia Dramatica on themes from Aida for flute & piano, Op. 134
- Fantasia for flute & piano on themes from Lucrezia Borgia
- Fantasia for flute & piano on themes from Verdi's Macbeth, Op. 47
- Fantasia for flute & piano on themes from Rigoletto, Op. 106
- Fantasia for flute & piano, Op. 108
- Fantasia for flute & piano, Op. 57
- Fantasia on themes from Il Trovatore
- Fantasia for flute & piano after Verdi's la Traviata, Op. 76
- Flute Concerto in F major (pub.1850 by Richault)
- Flute Concerto No.2 in E♭ major, Op. 19
- Flute Concerto (No.3?) in A major, Op. 130
- Le Streghe, for flute & piano, Op. 138
- Pot-pourri fantastique on themes from Il barbiere di by Rossini for wind quintet, Series 10, No 4
- Pot-pourri Fantastico, for flute & piano, on themes from Donizetti's Lucia di Lammermoor and Lucrezia Borgia, Op. 46
- Quintet for winds in B♭ major, Series 10, No 2
- Quintet for winds in B♭ major, Series 10, No.3
- Quintet for winds in D major, Op. 124
- Solo Romantico, Op. 72
- Theme and variations for flute & piano "Il carnevale di Venezia", Op. 78

== See also ==
- 7714 Briccialdi, an asteroid named after Giulio Briccialdi
