= Frank Elsass =

American musician

John Frank Elsass
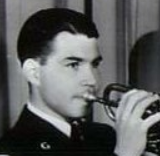
- J. Frank Elsass

Background information
- Born: March 3, 1913; Waynesburg, Ohio, U.S.
- Died: January 1, 1981 (aged 67)
- Genres: Concert band; Orchestra
- Occupation: Musician
- Instrument: Cornet
- Years active: 1934-1940
- Formerly of: Goldman Band

J. Frank Elsass (March 3, 1913 – January 1, 1981) was an American cornet soloist. He was the assistant cornet soloist with the Goldman Band from 1934 to 1940. He was also a member of the Barre Little Symphony from 1937 to 1940.

== Early life ==
John Frank Elsass was born on March 3, 1913, in Waynesburg, Ohio. Professionally, he went by the name "Frank Elsass".

== Education ==
Frank Elsass earned a master's degree in Music from New York University and a doctorate from the University of Texas. He was a student at the Ernest Williams School of Music and later served on the faculty there.

== Goldman Band ==
In 1934, Edwin Franko Goldman discovered Frank Elsass and hired him at age 19 to be a cornet soloist in the Goldman Band, assisting Del Staigers. Elsass stayed with the band through the 1940 season, serving as a reliable assistant cornet soloist to Del Staigers, David Rosebrook and Leonard B. Smith (Musician), as well as a member of the famed Goldman Band cornet trio "The Three Aces".

== Faculty positions ==
In 1941, Frank Elsass accepted a position as a brass instructor at San Jose State College. He left this position in 1942 and joined the US Navy, serving there through 1945. In 1948 he accepted a position as professor of trumpet and cornet and conductor of the symphonic band at the University of Texas at Austin where he remained through 1978.

== Awards ==
American Bandmasters Association 1966

== Death ==
Frank Elsass died of a rare and little known disease at the age of 67 on January 1, 1981. He is interred at Sandy Valley Cemetery, Waynesburg, Ohio.
