= Bill Tasillo =

American bandleader and promoter (1889–1945)

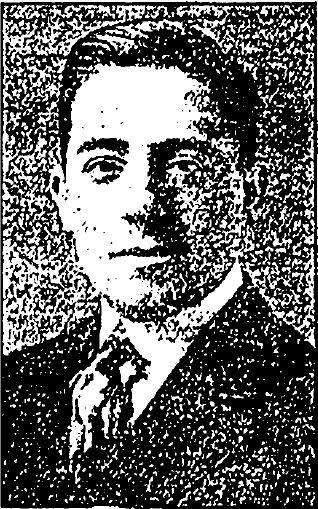
Portrait of William B. Tasillo taken circa 1923

William Benedict Tasillo (1889–1945), was an early 20th century bandleader, ensemble manager, nightclub owner and musician from Hartford, Connecticut. He was a cornetist and trumpeter with Paul Whiteman, Mal Hallet and B.A. Rolfe's orchestras. His contributions to big band entertainment and promotion in Connecticut and elsewhere in the Northeast were numerous. He was the founder of "Bill Tasillo's School of Popular Music", one of the earliest independent jazz and dance band training schools in the Northeast.

== Early life and education ==
Tasillo was born in the city of Hartford, Connecticut, to Italian immigrant parents on October 5, 1889. He was educated in Hartford public schools, where his musical training was set in motion by instructor William D. Monnier.

== Career ==
Playing with regional bands such as those led by Mal Hallet, Tasillo was known as a member of Paul Whiteman's Orchestra at one time. He mentored many later famous jazz musicians who played in his bands or nightclubs in Hartford, including reed player Robert "Bobby" Davis, saxophonist John "Jack" W. Eby and bandleader and pianist Earle "Nappy" Howard.

In Hartford, Tasillo was first associated with the Foot Guard Hall, an event venue for the Connecticut Governor's Foot Guard. Before 1921, he was a member of Satriano & Tasillo's Orchestra, led by Rocco Satriano. Tasillo was a member of the Connecticut National Guard and Foot Guard respectively, serving in the 169th Infantry. He was the bandmaster of the 169th Infantry Band from 1922 to 1927. Tasillo led the regimental band and society bands of the Foot Guard Hall, which were very popular at the time. In 1921, one of these bands played the entire summer engagement at Colt Park in Hartford. The Foot Guard Band, led by Tasillo, played at the inauguration of Herbert Hoover in 1929. He led the Foot Guard Band that same year as a featured ensemble at the 13th Eastern States Exposition in West Springfield, Massachusetts, returning to the fair in 1930. Tasillo's Foot Guard Band was awarded a parade cup by the Springfield office of the NRA for excellence in 1933. His dance ensembles also filled in on occasion for Edwin J. McEnelly's Orchestra at the former Crystal Ballroom of Riverside Park in Agawam, Massachusetts.

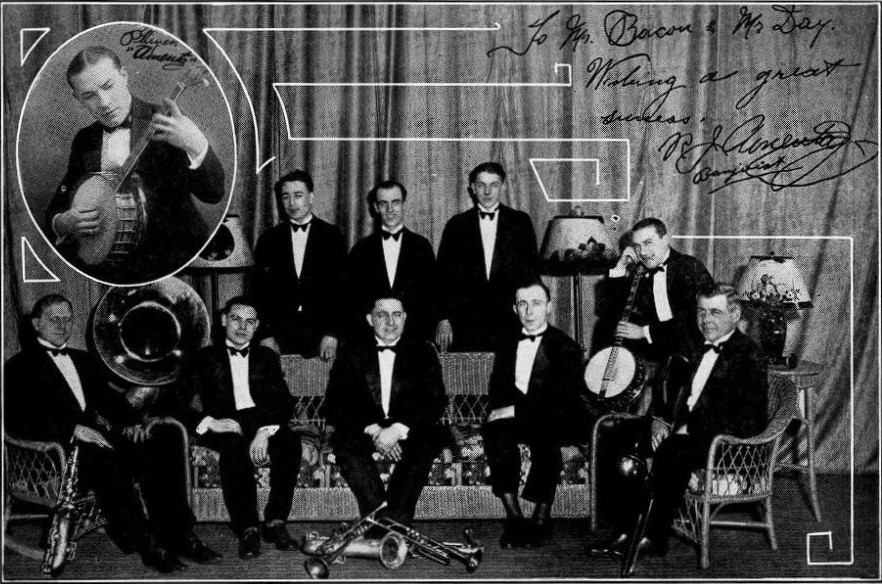
Members of Bill Tasillo's Le Bal Tabarin Orchestra, circa 1929

Among Tasillo's earliest ensembles was the house band of Le Bal Tabarin, named after the Bal Tabarin of Paris, a dance club formerly located in East Hartford, Connecticut. The club, which opened in May 1920, was known for its elaborate society dances and events. Tasillo's Le Bal Tabarin Orchestra became very popular locally in the 1920s. In 1922, Tasillo directed members of the Royal Marimba Band of Guatemala with his ensemble at Le Bal Tabarin for a seasonal engagement. Tasillo's Orchestra had seasonal engagements at Luna Park and the Elser Pier in Miami in 1923 and 1924. After the closure of the first Le Bal Tabarin, Tasillo's son, William J. Tasillo Jr., reopened the venue in 1927, formerly located at 126 Wells Street in Hartford.

Tasillo and his band featured Benny Davis's "Reaching for the Moon" in 1926. William Tasillo published two known compositions associated with his bands. The first was "Little Bit of Driftwood" by Norman T. Stocker and Leo J. Roy, published in 1927. And in 1929, the "1st Connecticut Foot Guard" March.

Tasillo also led the Cinderella Ballroom Orchestra in Hartford from September 25, 1924, to 1927, of the dance venue of the same name. The Cinderella Ballroom was managed by Tasillo, formerly located at 51 Pratt Street in Hartford. The Cinderella Ballroom Orchestra was the most well-known in New England of Tasillo's various ensembles, making guest appearances at other dance venues and nightclubs in Massachusetts and elsewhere. In 1925, Tasillo hosted a battle of the bands at the Cinderella Ballroom between his band and Swanie's Serenaders. Ruth Malcomson, Miss America for 1924, appeared at the Ballroom that same year for a beauty contest hosted by Tasillo. Fletcher Henderson's Orchestra was one of many bands that played at the Cinderella Ballroom.

In 1927, William Tasillo operated a "School of Popular Music" in Hartford, with instructors from his Foot Guard Society Orchestra teaching jazz-oriented instruments, including trumpet, banjo, and piano.

At the start of the Great Depression, the bandleader opened "Bill" Tasillo's College Inn, a nightclub connected to the former luxury Garde Hotel of Hartford. This nightclub operated from 1929 to 1931.

In 1930, Tasillo participated in the cornerstone laying of the State Office Building and in 1935, the inaugural opening of the lounge room at the Hotel Bond in Hartford. In 1939, Tasillo appeared alongside Benny Goodman for a fundraiser and ball at the Governor's Foot Guard Hall in Hartford.

Tasillo resided in Miami, Florida in his later years, where his orchestra was playing engagements at the Copacabana nightclub with his son's ensemble as late as 1944. He died in Hartford the following year.

== Radio ==
Bill Tasillo's Orchestra was among the first instrumental ensembles to broadcast in the initial months of station WTIC being on the air. Tasillo's radio ensemble, The Sparklers, was later a regular band broadcast over WTIC. Tasillo's band was also featured in the first and second 'Radio Ball' broadcasts in 1925 and 1926 hosted by WBZ, alongside popular jazz bandleaders from the Northeast, including Paul Specht and Edwin J. McEnelly. Tasillo's band would make an appearance on the fourth WBZ Radio Ball alongside Frankie Carle of McEnelly's group. The Radio Ball events took place at the former Cook's Butterfly Ballroom in Springfield, Massachusetts.

Tasillo's dance and nightclub orchestras were also broadcast weekly on location over WTIC radio, including Bill Tasillo's College Inn Orchestra. Tasillo's Le Bal Tabarin Orchestra was broadcast over WQAM in Miami as early as 1923.

== Volunteer work ==
Tasillo was a member of the Rotary Club of Hartford from the mid-1920s, leading the "Rotary Club Boys' Band", which promoted young musicians from the area. At the request of Tasillo, John Philip Sousa was a guest conductor of the Boys' Band in 1926. They were also broadcast regularly over WTIC under the direction of Tasillo. Tasillo also led frequent volunteer concerts for area institutions such as the St. Agnes Home of West Hartford, the Undercliff Tuberculosis Sanatorium of Meriden and a Red Cross entertainment at the Hotel Bond following the 1936 flood. During the Great Depression, Tasillo led a WPA dance band in Hartford, which included saxophonist Fred Augsten.
