= Pietro Capodiferro =

American musician (1882–1953)

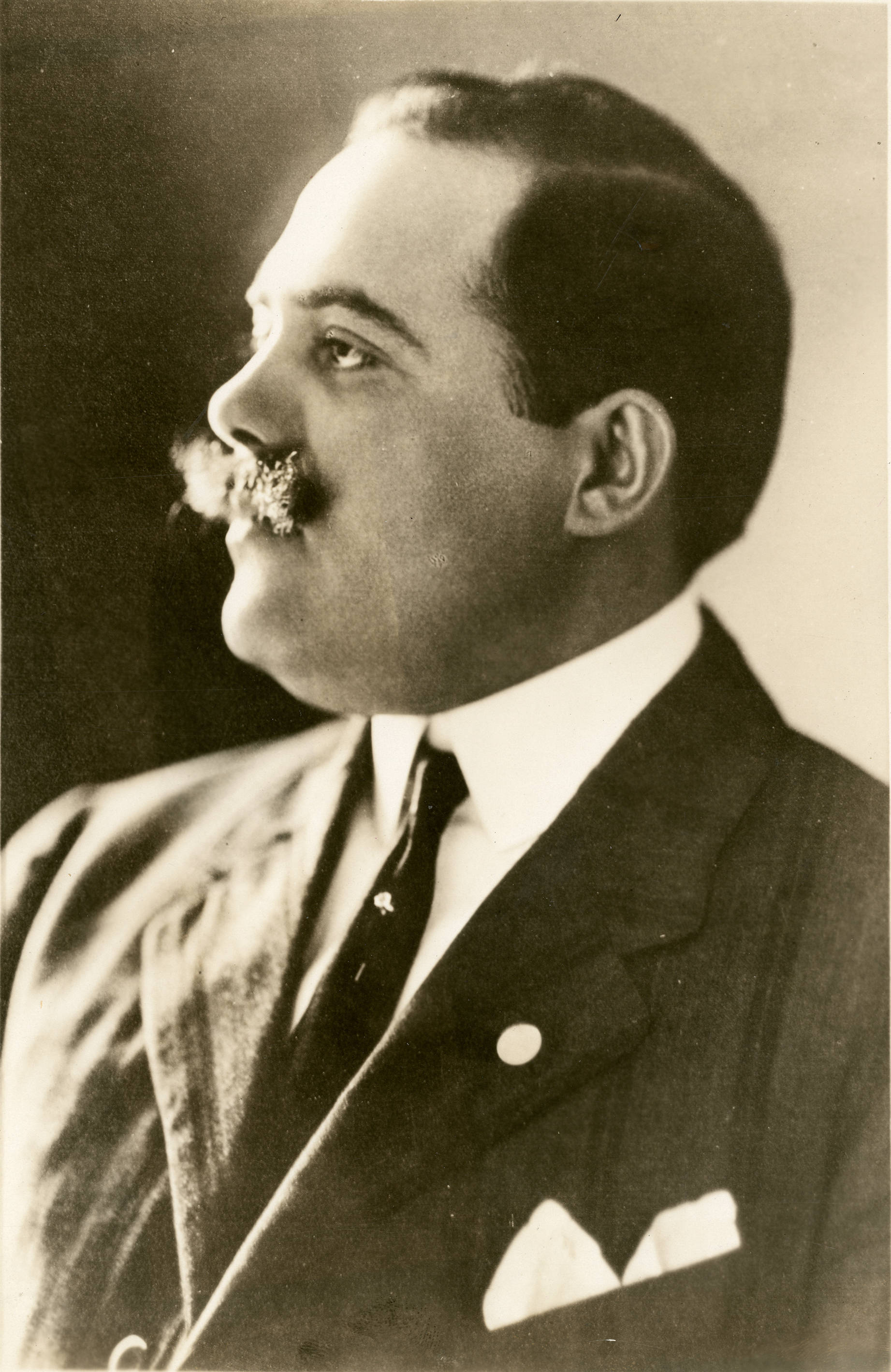

Background information
- Born: Pietro Capodiferro; October 13, 1882; Acquaviva, Bari, Italy
- Died: May 10, 1953 (aged 70) Brookhaven, New York
- Genres: Orchestra
- Occupation: Musician
- Instruments: Cornet, Trumpet
- Labels: Brunswick Records, Edison Records
- Formerly of: New York Symphony Society, Metropolitan Opera Orchestra

Pietro Capodiferro (October 13, 1882 – May 10, 1953) was an American trumpeter, cornetist and recording artist. He was the principal trumpet with the Metropolitan Opera Orchestra from 1912 to 1919.

== Early life ==
Pietro Capodiferro was born in Acquaviva, Bari, Italy on October 13, 1882, the son of Vito Antonio Capodiferro (1854–1925) and Nunziata Maria Giandomenico (1858-19?). Pietro and his father emigrated to the United States in 1898 while his mother and siblings emigrated in 1899. They settled in Manhattan, New York.

== Performance career ==
Pietro Capodiferro began his musical career as trumpeter with the Twenty-Second Regiment Band. In 1902 he was principal trumpet with the New York Symphony Society Orchestra, succeeding Albert Bode. In 1906 he was trumpeter with the Manhattan Opera House, a competitor of the Metropolitan Opera Orchestra. In 1912 he became principal trumpet with the Metropolitan Opera Orchestra, succeeding Jacob Hagar. He remained in that position through 1919, eventually leaving due to an illness. After his tenure there, he became director of the orchestra of Oscar Hammerstein's Manhattan Opera Company.

In 1914, he was listed as a member of Nahan Franko's band. In 1920, he became principal trumpet with the New Symphony Orchestra under the direction of Arthur Bodanzky. From 1920 to 1926 he was principal trumpet with The Capital Theater. In the late 1920s he was principal trumpet with the Roxy Symphony Orchestra. During the late 1920s and early 1930s he was a New York City based radio musician. On July 15 and 16 he was guest cornet soloist with the famous Goldman Band of New York. There is no specified cornet solo listed on the program, but he was known to have already recorded Rossini's "Inflammatus" from Stabat Mater, a piece frequently performed by the Goldman Band. He also performed with the Goldman Band cornet trio, performing Victor Herbert's "The Three Solitaires" along with fellow cornetists David Rosebrook and Frank Elsass.

== Death ==
Pietro Capodiferro died on May 10, 1953, in Brookhaven, NY. His wake was held at the Park East Memorial Chapel in the Bronx, New York.
