= Ernest S. Williams =

Ernest S. Williams may refer to:

- Ernest S. Williams (minister), general superintendent of the Assemblies of God
- Ernest Williams (conductor), American band conductor, composer and music educator

== See also ==
- Ernest Williams (disambiguation)
