= Vincent Buono =

Vincent C. Buono
- Birth name: Vincent Carmine Buono
- Born: August 3, 1875; San Valentino Torio, Salerno, Italy
- Died: June 3, 1959 (aged 83); Brooklyn, NY
- Genres: Concert Band, Orchestra
- Occupation: Musician
- Instrument(s): Cornet, Trumpet
- Years active: 1892-1955
- Labels: Columbia Records, Edison Records
- Formerly of: Goldman Band, New York Symphony Society

Vincent C. Buono (August 3, 1875 – June 3, 1959) was an American cornet and trumpet soloist. He was the principal trumpet with The New York Symphony Society from 1922 to 1923. He was also the principal cornet soloist with the Goldman Band in 1923.

== Early life ==
Vincent Carmine Buono was born on August 3, 1875, in San Valentino Torio, Salerno, Italy. He emigrated to the United States in 1890 and settled in Brooklyn, New York. He became a naturalized citizen in 1899.

== Performance career ==
Vincent Buono began his career performing in theaters and playing with many bands and orchestras, including Neyer's Seventh Regiment Band. By 1892, he was a member of the musicians union. In 1901, he was one of the first musicians hired by Charles Adam Prince and the Columbia Phonograph Company, a company for whom he worked for over twenty years. He recorded with Frederick Neil Innes from 1902 to 1923.

In 1922, Buono left Prince's band to accept a position with Walter Damrosch's Symphony Orchestra. At the time, there were 2 symphony orchestras in New York - The Philharmonic Society of New York and The New York Symphony Society under Walter Damrosch. The 2 orchestras merged in 1928, becoming The New York Philharmonic. Buono was principal trumpet with The New York Symphony Society from 1922 to 1923 and remained first trumpet through 1928.

In 1917, Buono was cornet soloist with Edwin Franko Goldman's New York Military Band. The following year, Goldman hired Ernest Williams to be his principal cornet soloist and Buono was made assistant cornet soloist. He became principal cornet soloist in 1923 when Williams left the band. Herbert L. Clarke, a contemporary, was known to have praised Buono's fine playing, saying Buono was one of the finest first chair cornetists in the band business. In addition to playing with The Goldman Band, Buono is said to have played with both John Philip Sousa's Band and Arthur Pryor's Band. One of his arrangements, the cornet solo "A Soldier's Dream" became so famous, he disowned it.

== Death ==
Vincent Buono died on June 3, 1959, in Brooklyn. He is believed interred at St. Charles Cemetery, Farmingdale, NY.
