= James F. Burke (musician) =

American musician (1923–1981)

James Francis Burke
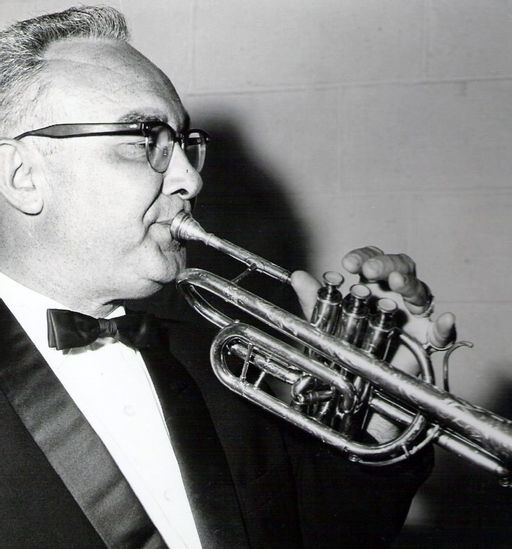

Background information
- Born: James Francis Burke; April 15, 1923; Port Jefferson, New York, U.S.
- Died: June 26, 1981 (aged 58) New York City, U.S.
- Genre: Concert band
- Occupation: Musician
- Instruments: Cornet, trumpet
- Years active: 1943–1974
- Labels: Decca Records, Golden Crest Records

James Francis Burke (April 15, 1923 – June 26, 1981) was an American cornet soloist. He was the principal cornet soloist with the Goldman Band from 1943 to 1974. He was also the principal trumpet with The Baltimore Symphony Orchestra from 1943 to 1949. Mr. Burke, who had the use of only one arm, was considered the greatest virtuoso of his time on the instrument, according to Ainslee Cox, conductor of the Guggenheim Memorial Band.

== Early life ==
James Francis (Jimmy) Burke was born in Port Jefferson, New York. At his birth, Jimmy sustained a brachial plexus injury, rendering his right arm useless. He began to play the trumpet at age 5, but since he could not hold the horn, his father had a tripod stand built for him. The top of it was shaped like a horseshoe and the horn would sit in that stand with a strap going over it in front of the valves. The stand was on rollers and could also be raised and lowered like a music stand.

When he was seven years old, he started performing for the Rotary Club and for different organizations. In 1936 he played on WJZ (AM) on Sunday mornings from 9 to 10 o'clock. The program was called "Coast To Coast On A Bus" and Milton Cross was the announcer. Then from 11 to 12 o'clock, he went to ABC (which was CBS at that time) to The Horn and Hardart Children's Hour. Paul Douglas (actor) was the announcer. Jimmy played on these 2 shows for 7 years, playing 2 different solos every morning. When he was 13, some of the participants from The Horn and Hardart Children's Hour made a movie for Warner Brothers called "Stars Of Tomorrow". In the film, 5 boys make up a hillbilly band.

== Education ==
Jimmy's first teacher was his father from the age of 5 until the age of 13. He then studied with Del Staigers in 1936 and 1937. Lessons were conducted at Staigers' apartment in Sunnyside, Queens, New York. He regarded Staigers as the greatest player he had ever heard. It was Staigers who suggested to the King Musical Instrument Company that they build a cornet for left handed playing. Jimmy then studied with John "Ned" Mahoney, a cornetist with The Goldman Band and a graduate of The Ernest Williams School of Music. From 1938 through 1943 Burke attended Ernest Williams School of Music at 153 Ocean Avenue Brooklyn, New York. During those 6 summers, he attended The Ernest Williams Band Camp at Saugerties, New York.

== The Goldman Band ==
From 1943 to 1974 Jimmy was the principal cornet soloist and solo chair with The Goldman Band. During his 32-year career, he was contracted to play five solos each week. The band performed seven nights a week with 50 concerts in a summer season. All totaled, Jimmy performed over 1,100 solos with The Goldman Band. He had a prodigious memory for music and rarely read from sheet music during a performance.

== Baltimore Symphony Orchestra ==
In 1943 Jimmy moved to Baltimore and began a seven-year stint as principal trumpet with the Baltimore Symphony Orchestra as well as the Professor of Trumpet at Peabody Conservatory and Conductor of the band. During the summers, he took the train to New York City to play with The Goldman Band.

== Cities Service Band of America ==
Upon his return from Baltimore in 1950, Jimmy received a call from Paul Lavalle who asked him to join his band. Jimmy stayed with the band for six years. He had a featured solo performance of "The Carnival of Venice" on the RCA Victor LP "A Sunday Band Concert".

== All-Star Concert Band ==
In 1960 he co-founded The All-Star Concert Band with American tubist Harvey Phillips. The band recorded two LPs under the Golden Crest label. The first, titled "The All-Star Concert Band" was recorded September 17–18, 1960 at the Huntington Theatre, Huntington, New York. The second LP titled "The Burke-Phillips All-Star Concert Band" was recorded a year later.

== Awards ==
- National Champion, 1939 National Trumpet Competition
- New York Brass Conference For Scholarships
- Associated Musicians of Greater New York Local 802
- Port Jefferson High School Wall of Fame

== Death ==
On June 26, 1981, Jimmy suffered a massive heart attack while conducting a rehearsal of The Guggenheim Memorial Band, the successor to The Goldman Band.

== Discography ==
Solo Recordings

- 1954 National Music Contest Selections (1954) [Polymusic PR/EE 101]
- Horn of Plenty (1957) [Decca 8489]
- Clinician Series (1960) [Golden Crest CRG-1004]
- The All-Star Concert Band (1960) [Golden Crest CR-4025]
- The Burke-Phillips All-Star Concert Band (1961) [Golden Crest CR-4040]

Artist Workshop Series

- The Magic Trumpet (1958) [Artist Workshop Series AWS 101]
- Tropical Trumpets (1959) [Artist Workshop Series AWS 102] (Trumpet trio with Jack Holland and Ted Weis)
- Introduction and Tarentella (1959) [Artist Workshop Series AWS 103]
- Bright Eyes (Trio) (1959) [Artist Workshop Series AWS 104] (Trumpet trio with Jack Holland and Ted Weis)

With The Goldman Band

- America Marches (1947) [Regent MG-6021]
- Sousa - Goldman Marches (1949) [Columbia CL 6080]
- On The Mall (1951) [Decca DL-5386]
- America Marches (1955) [RCA Camden – CAL-125]
- On Parade! (1955) [Decca DL 5546]
- Here Comes the Band! (1955) [Decca DL 8185]
- I Love to Hear a Band (1957) [Decca DL 8445]
- Semper Fidelis - The Marches of John Philip Sousa (1957) [Harmony HL 7001]
- Band Masterpieces (1958) [Decca DL 8633]
- The Sound of the Goldman Band (post 1959) [Decca DL 8931]
- Golden March Favorites (1960) [Decca DL 4453]
- Sousa Marches in Hi Fi (1960) [Decca DL 8807]
- Cavalcade of the American Band (1962) [Capitol W 1688]
- Marching Along Together (1963) [Decca DL 4450]

With Leroy Anderson

- Leroy Anderson Conducts His Music (1951) [MCA 531] (Featured Soloist on "A Trumpeter's Lullaby")
- Leroy Anderson Conducts Leroy Anderson (1954) [MCA 555] ("Bugler's Holiday" trumpet trio with Raymond Crisara and John Ware)

With Archie Bleyer

- S'il Vous Plait (1954) [Cadence 1241]

With Robert Russell Bennett

- Victory at Sea (1955) [RCA Victor Red Seal LM 1779]

With Paul Lavalle

- America's Favorite Marches (1951) [RCA Victor LPM-6]
- A Sunday Band Concert (1953) [RCA Victor LPM-3120] (Featured Soloist "The Carnival of Venice")
- "The Carnival of Venice" (1953) [RCA Victor 47-5203] (Vinyl, 7-inch 45 rpm)
- Lavalle at Work (1954) [RCA Victor LPM-1026]
- Great Band Music (1955) [RCA Victor LPM-1133]

With Morton Gould

- Hi Fi Band Concert (Columbia Concert Band) (1956) [Columbia CL 954]
- Brass and Percussion (1957) [RCA Victor 09026-61255-2]
- The Band Plays On (Columbia Concert Band) (circa 1959) [Columbia Masterworks AL 57]

With Robert Shaw

- Mass in B Minor (1960) [RCA Victor Red Seal LSC-6157]

With Igor Stravinsky

- The Rite of Spring (1960) [Columbia MS-6319]

With Andre Kostelanetz (see notes)

- Wonderland of Sound - Star Spangled Marches (1962) [Columbia CS-8518]
- The Thunderer - The Spectacular Sound of John Philip Sousa (1965) [Columbia CS-9159]

With Thomas Schippers (see notes)

- Menotti - Amahl And The Night Visitors (1952) [RCA Victor Red Seal LM-1701]

With Leopold Stokowski (see notes)

- Swan Lake (1955) [RCA Victor LM-1864]
- (Others- See notes)
- Notes – According to his self published resume, James F. Burke played on "many recordings conducted by Stokowski, Morton Gould, Andre Kostelanetz and Thomas Schippers". In the early days of recordings, musicians rarely (if ever) received credit in the liner notes of album jackets so it is unknown for certain on which albums Mr. Burke performed. In the case of Morton Gould, credit was given to musicians on the album jacket. In the case of Andre Kostelanetz, his overall discography suggests that the two albums listed are where Jimmy would most likely have been contracted to perform.

== Broadway shows ==
- My Fair Lady
- Oklahoma!
- Song Of Norway
- The Music Man
- Cabaret
- I Do! I Do!
- The Rothschilds (musical)
- George M
- South Pacific

== Television shows ==
- Wide, Wide World with Dave Garroway NBC
- Tic Tac Dough NBC
- Dough Re Mi with Gene Rayburn NBC
- Twenty-One with Jack Barry NBC
- Thy Kingdom Come (Harriss Hubble) NBC
- The Jackie Gleason Show CBS

== Faculty positions ==
- Peabody Conservatory 1943–1949
- Ithaca College 1957–1961
- University of Bridgeport 1978–1979
- Hofstra University 1974–1981
- Manhattan School of Music 1980–1981 (he taught (briefly) in the MSM Preparatory Division.)

== Published works ==
Cornet/trumpet solos

- The Runaway Trumpet (1952) Mercury Music Corporation (www.presser.com)
- Hocus Polka (1952) Mercury Music Corporation(www.presser.com)
- Prom Waltz (1952) Mercury Music Corporation(www.presser.com)
- Serenade In 6/8 (1952) Mercury Music Corporation(www.presser.com)
- Strictly GI (1952) Mercury Music Corporation(www.presser.com)
- Twilight Tune (1952) Mercury Music Corporation(www.presser.com)
- The Magic Trumpet (1955) Carl Fischer
- Begine (1956) Chas. Colin
- Caprice (1956) Chas. Colin
- Joneta (1956) Chas. Colin
- Amourette (1959) Carl Fischer
- Danza Allegre (1960) Carl Fischer
- Jolene (1963) Chas. Colin
- Jimala Beguine (1964) Carl Fischer

Method book

- New Directions In Tonguing (1956) Chas. Colin

== Unpublished works ==
- Eventide
- Zorita (1968)

== Sources ==
- Baltimore Symphony Orchestra Trumpet Section – View topic: Trumpet Herald forum
- Edwin Franko Goldman | WNYC | New York Public Radio, Podcasts, Live Streaming Radio, News (Edwin Franko Goldman mentions James Burke beginning at approximately 13:00.)
