= Waino Kauppi =

American musician (1898–1932)

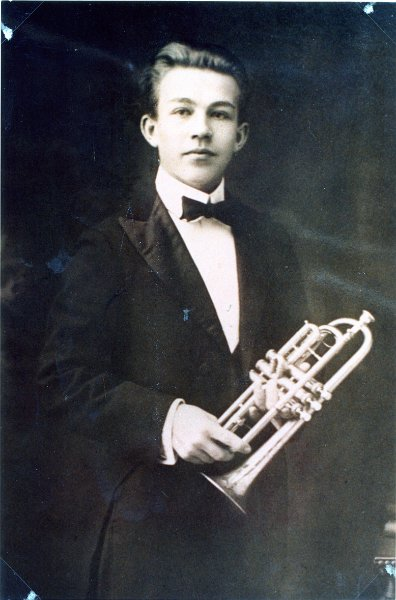
- Young Waino Kauppi
- Born: 1898; Finland
- Died: November 25, 1932 (aged 33–34); New York City New York U.S.
- Occupation: Musician

Waino Kauppi (December 15, 1897 Halsua Finland – November 24, 1932 New York City) was a musician who played both the cornet and the trumpet. Known as the "Boy Wonder", at age 12 Kauppi was one of the first triple-tonguing cornetists. He played as a cornet soloist for bands like the Edwin McEnelly Orchestra, the Goldman Band and, his own, Waino Kauppi Suomi Orkesteri. He had numerous records to his credit.

== Early days ==
Waino Kauppi was born in 1898 and was an immigrant from Finland. He grew up in Maynard, Massachusetts, a factory town with a large Finnish immigrant population. He was a child prodigy and, by the age of 12, he became one of the first triple-tonguing cornetists. By 14, he was touring with bands such as Teel's Band of Boston.

== Career ==
=== 1924–1926: The Goldman Band ===
The Goldman Band was a military-style band organized by Edwin Franko Goldman. Goldman recruited "the best wind players available in New York" including Waino Kauppi who went on to play as a cornet soloist. Kauppi's solos gained exposure after being broadcast by WEAF at the Goldman Band's free nightly showings at New York University. He became known as "The Wizard of the Cornet" and by the eighth season of the shows, Kauppi purchased a red-gold Victor Cornet which he began using in all his appearances on stage. Kauppi attributed much of his success to the red-gold instrument he used. Goldman himself has proclaimed Kauppi to be the "most finished and delightful of artists on the cornet". In July 1926, Kauppi suffered a serious nervous breakdown and thus, his contract with the Goldman Band was terminated. He was subsequently replaced by Del Staigers.

=== 1917–1924: Edwin J. McEnelly Orchestra ===
Kauppi joined the Edwin J. McEnelly Orchestra as a cornet player in the year of 1917. The McEnelly orchestra didn't make public recordings until 1925. McEnelly’s orchestra recorded 21 sides for Victor Company. Waino Kauppi was drawn away from the McEnelly orchestra and left in 1924.

=== 1927: Waino Kauppi Suomi Orkesteri ===
Waino Kauppu had also created his own group of musicians in which he continued to play as solo cornetist. He produced and recorded six sides for Victor Company.

== Death ==
After Kauppi lost his front teeth in an automobile accident, he had dentures made, but he could no longer play his instrument like he used to. He committed suicide in his Bronx apartment by turning on the gas in his kitchen.
