= Raymond Crisara =

American trumpeter

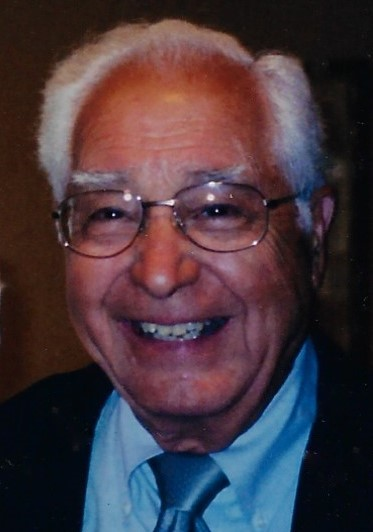

Background information
- Born: October 19, 1920; Cortland, New York, U.S.
- Died: May 25, 2014 (aged 93) Austin, Texas, U.S.
- Genres: Orchestra, Concert Band
- Occupations: Musician, Educator
- Instruments: Trumpet, Cornet
- Years active: 1941-1982
- Labels: Victor Records, Golden Crest Records
- Formerly of: Metropolitan Opera Orchestra, NBC Symphony, Goldman Band, Paul Lavalle

Raymond Dominick Crisara (October 19, 1920 – May 25, 2014) was an American trumpeter and educator. He was the principal trumpet with the Metropolitan Opera Orchestra from 1941 to 1943. He was associate first trumpet with the NBC Symphony from 1946 to 1954. He was Professor of Trumpet at the University of Texas from 1978 to 2001.

== Early life ==
Raymond Dominick Crisara was born in Cortland, New York.

== Education ==
Raymond Crisara was a student at the Ernest Williams School of Music from 1937 to 1940. He then moved to the University of Michigan as a student and teaching assistant under Dr. William Revelli from 1940 to 1941.

== Performance career ==
Raymont Crisara's first major professional gig came as a cornet soloist with The Goldman Band, replacing Frank Elsass. In the summer of 1941, Crisara, aged 19, auditioned for and was awarded the position of Principal Trumpet with the Metropolitan Opera Orchestra. In December 1942, Crisara was drafted into the US Army. After his release from the US Army in 1946, Crisara became associate 1st/3rd trumpet with the NBC Symphony under Arturo Toscanini, a position he held through 1954 when the orchestra was disbanded. While under contract to NBC, Crisara also performed on radio and television (and recorded with) NBC's Band of America. He was an in demand studio musician, recording with Paul McCartney, Kiss, Janis Joplin, and Carole King. He performed for Frank Sinatra and Liza Minnelli.

== Personal life ==
Crisara married Angela Mazzuchi on 10 May 1949 in New York City.

== Television shows ==
- Wide, Wide World with Dave Garroway
- The Jack Parr Show
- The Dick Cavett Show
- The Perry Como Show

== Recordings ==
- Victory at Sea (1955) [RCA Victor Red Seal LM 1779]
- The All-Star Concert Band (1960) [Golden Crest CR-4025]
- The Burke-Phillips All-Star Concert Band (1961) [Golden Crest CR-4040]
- Leroy Anderson Conducts Leroy Anderson (1954) [MCA 555] ("Bugler's Holiday" trumpet trio with James F. Burke (Musician) and John Ware)

== Faculty Positions ==
- University of Bridgeport 3 years
- NYU (adjunct professor) 6 years
- University of Texas 1978-2001

== Awards ==
- American Bandmasters Association
