= Vernon Jannotta =

United States Navy admiral (1894–1972)

Alfred Vernon Jannotta (13 December 1894 – 31 May 1972) was a United States Navy rear admiral who saw action in WWI and WWII, and an American businessman.

== Early years ==
Jannotta was the son of Alfred Antonio Jannotta, an Italian composer, conductor, and voice instructor, and his second wife, Stella (née Skiff) of the Jewel Tea Company family. He was born in Chicago.

He studied at Cornell University from September 1912, serving for two years in the Cornell Cadet Corps. He joined the Sigma Nu fraternity and the Savage Club of Ithaca, New York. He graduated with a B.A. degree in business administration.

== World War I ==
Jannotta enlisted in the US Naval Reserve as a sailor in April 1917. He was then selected for training at the US Naval Academy at Annapolis, Maryland, then commissioned as an ensign. He saw service protecting convoys in the Atlantic Ocean. He transferred to the USS San Diego, the only U.S. Navy cruiser to be sunk during World War I. Jannotta survived the 19 July 1918 sinking after eight hours in the water. He was given survivor's leave, which allowed him time to marry Mary (May) Broderick Lamm on 20 August 1918. He was posted to serve as a liaison officer with the British Royal Navy. His active duty ceased in February 1919, as a Lieutenant (junior grade). He remained in the Naval Reserve until September 1921.

=== San Diego Watch ===
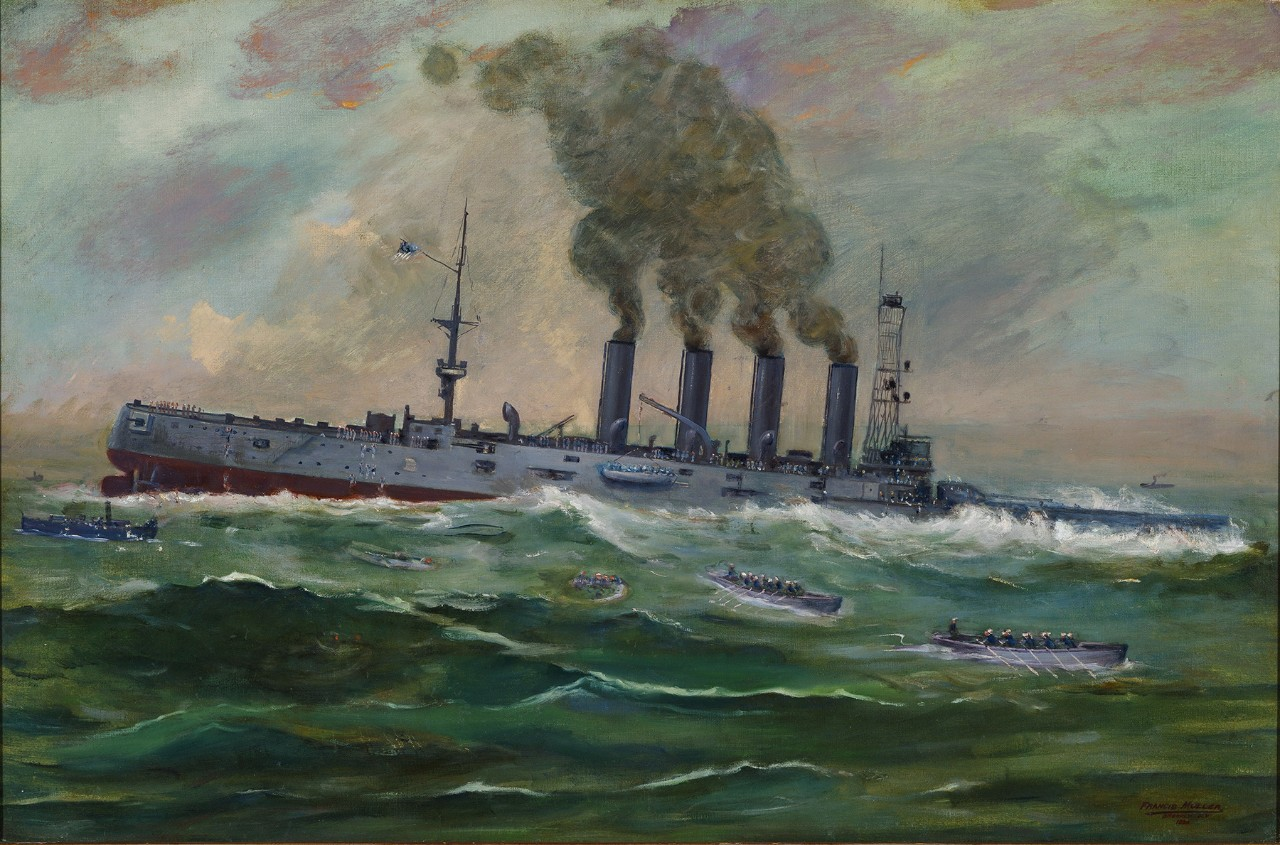
"The Sinking of USS San Diego" by Francis Muller.

Jannotta lost a gold locket with the San Diego. It and another watch were found by two divers in 1981, but it was only the internet that allowed its finder to research the inscriptions, “AVJ” on one side and “To my beloved son Vernon” on the other. In April 2017, the watch was returned to Jannotta's family.

=== San Diego Loans ===
San Diego survivors were rescued by a Dutch freighter that dropped the men off at Hoboken, New Jersey, across the Hudson River from New York City. The survivors had lost all of their possessions, so Jannotta sent a telegram to his uncle who sent him $2,000 by wire transfer. Jannotta lent each sailor $10 to buy clothes. The final sailor repaid the loan in 1939 after tracking him down.

== Inter-war period ==
=== Jewel Tea Company, Inc. ===
Jannotta began his business career in 1919 as a salesman in the family's firm, the Jewel Tea Company of Chicago. He was associated with the company for fifty years in various capacities including recording secretary, director, and assistant to the president.

=== Management ===
He was a business executive and management consultant in several other firms, and his interests were spread among furniture stores, self-service laundries, construction businesses, and food chain stores. Jannotta held executive positions in or owned the following companies: the investment and banking firm of Lehman Brothers (New York City), 1926–1927; Motor Institute of America (Chicago), 1927–1932; and, Tapp Inc. (furniture manufactures, Chicago), 1932–1942.

== World War II ==
Jannotta rejoined the Navy in September 1942 with the rank of lieutenant commander and served until February 1946, with the amphibious forces in the South and Southwest Pacific Ocean, in each commanding Landing Craft Infantry (Large) (LCI(L)):

- From January 1943 to April 1944, he commanded LCI (L) Group 14 (12 ships) of Flotilla 5; and
- From July 1944 to August 1945, he commanded LCI (L) Flotilla 24 (36-45 ships).

From December 27, 1944, to February 11, 1945, 23 ships of LCI (L) Flotilla 24 operated as a part of Task Group 77.11, formed as a special attack force to conduct deceptive diversionary operations in connection with the Luzon campaigns and was based at Mindanao in the Philippine Islands. On 30 December 1944, a Japanese suicide plane struck the USS Orestes (AGP-10) and set the ship on fire.

=== Orestes action ===
While in command of the local Landing Craft Infantry force at Mindoro Island, Philippines on 30 December 1944, Jannotta was near USS Orestes (AGP-10) when that ship was attacked by an Imperial Japanese Navy Aichi D3A 'Val' dive bomber that crashed into its starboard (right) side with the bombs exploding inside the ship. The resulting fire endangered the cargo of fuel and torpedoes. Its captain and force commander, Captain Mentz, was injured and out of action. Lieutenant Commander Davis took PT boat personnel on board to search for wounded. With Mentz injured, Commander Jannotta became the senior officer and ordered the LCIs alongside Orestes and firefighting to be commenced. Under Jannotta's direct command, the fire was brought under control and the ship was saved from destruction, thus preserving the only supply of aviation gas in the area available at the time for the Motor Torpedo Boats of the Task Group.

=== Decorations ===
Jannotta's actions during the operation, included personally boarding the Orestes and fighting the fire, earned him the Navy Cross. The commentation reads: "The President of the United States takes pleasure in presenting the Navy Cross to Alfred V. Jannotta, Commander, U.S. Navy (Reserve), for extraordinary heroism and distinguished service in the line of his profession as Commander, LCI Flotilla Twenty-Four, in action on 30 December 1944, at Mindoro, in the Philippine Islands.

The conduct of Commander Jannotta throughout this action reflects great credit upon himself, and was in keeping with the highest traditions of the United States Naval Service."

In addition, Jannotta received two Bronze Stars for meritorious service, the Silver Star for conspicuous gallantry, the Purple Heart, and several other citations and commendations for his World War II service.

== Post WWII ==
In 1946, Jannotta served in Washington, D.C., on President Harry S. Truman's Special Board to define a post-war Navy. In business, he held executive positions or ownership in: Consolidated Trading Corporation (Chicago), 1947–1949; Mayfair, Inc. (Albany, New York); Porter Furniture Company (Racine, Wisconsin) after 1949; Fox River Stone Company (Elgin, Illinois); and J.D. Jewell, Inc., and Standard Packaging Corporation (New York) after 1955. He was also a director of the National Retail Tea and Coffee Merchants' Association and of the Furniture Manufacturers' Association, and a vice-president and director of the Order of Lafayette.

Continuing in the Reserve, he was promoted to captain in 1953 and to rear admiral on his retirement in 1954. He was associated with the Navy League of the United States, Legion of Valor Association, Reserve Officers Association, Society of Mayflower Descendants, War Society of the Cruiser and Transport Force, Chicago Athletic Association, Cornell Alumni Club, Military Affairs Committee of the Florida State Chamber of Commerce, Order souverain et militaire du temple de Jerusalem, Peter Tare, Inc., and Sons of the Revolution. Jannotta served as a councilor in Lantana, Florida from 1966 to 1969.

He remained in close contact with the officers of Flotilla 24 after the war. The first reunion was in Evanston, Illinois, in 1948; in 1965 they were incorporated as the LCI (L) Flotilla 24, Inc. In October 1961, when he was awarded an honorary Doctor of Science, an academic chair was endowed in Jannotta's name by his flotilla at the Detroit Institute of Technology's College of Business Administration.

Jannotta was a native of Oak Park, Illinois, and had residences in Kenilworth, Illinois, Short Hills, New Jersey, and Lantana, Florida. He died on 31 May 1972, survived by his wife, Mary (1900–1988), two of his three daughters, Diane Broderick (Mrs. Wallace B. Mallu) and Shirley (Mrs. Henry C. Nickel) – (Mary Francis died of diabetes in 1966), six grandchildren, and a great-grandchild, as well as his brother Joseph. He is interred at Arlington National Cemetery with his wife Mary Broderick Lamm and their daughter Mary Francis (1919–1966).
