= Bill Tasillo Jr. =

American bandleader

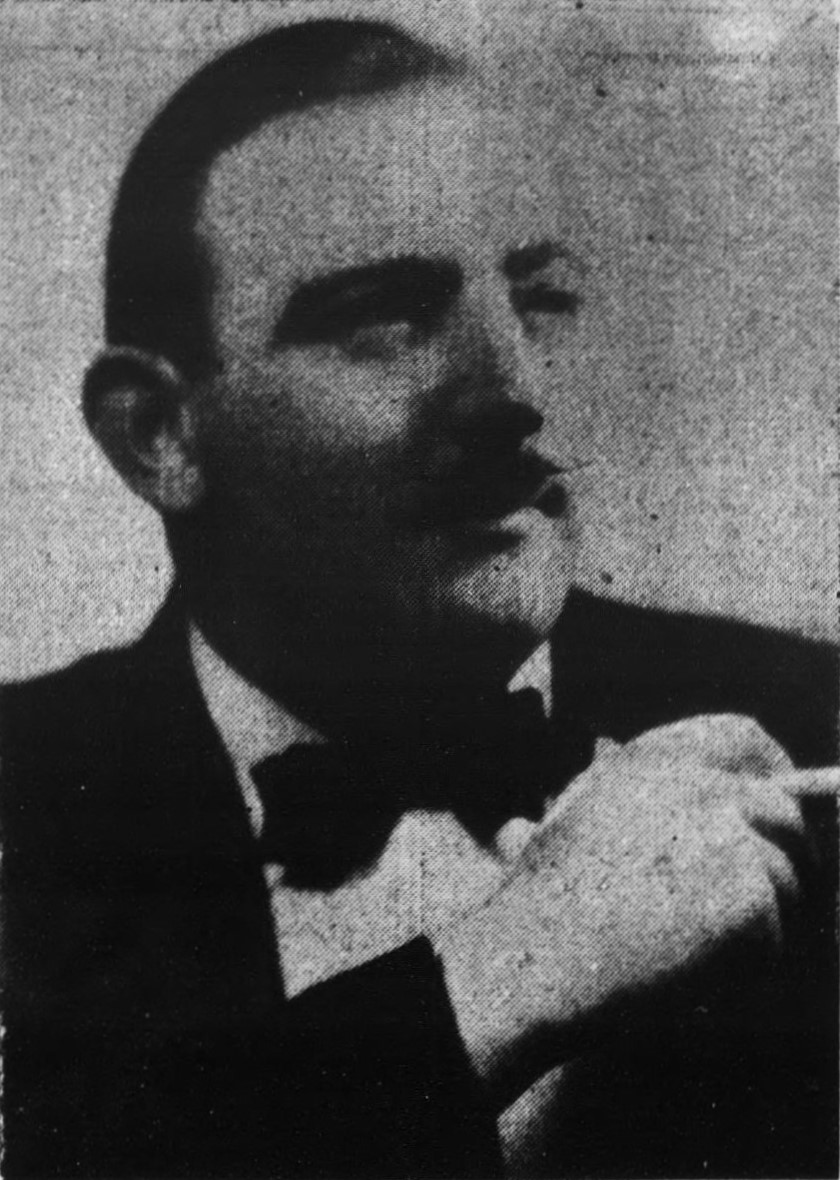
Portrait of Bill Tasillo Jr. circa 1936

William J. Tasillo Jr. (1907-1947) was a 20th century American cornetist, bandleader and promoter. He was a member of the Mal Hallett, Edwin J. McEnelly and Hal McIntyre orchestras, and led his own ensembles in Hartford, Connecticut including the second Le Bal Tabarin Orchestra. He was well known in the Northeast as a cornet and trumpet player, and was a personal friend of 'Fats' Waller. His nickname was "Hot Lips Bill".

== Early life ==
William J. Tasillo Jr. was born in Hartford, Connecticut on October 20, 1907, the second son of Catherine D. Tasillo and bandleader William "Bill" Tasillo. In addition to musical instruction from his father, William J. Tasillo was mentored by music educator William D. Monnier in Hartford public schools. He was known as "Bill Tasillo Jr.", despite having a different middle name from his father.

== Career ==
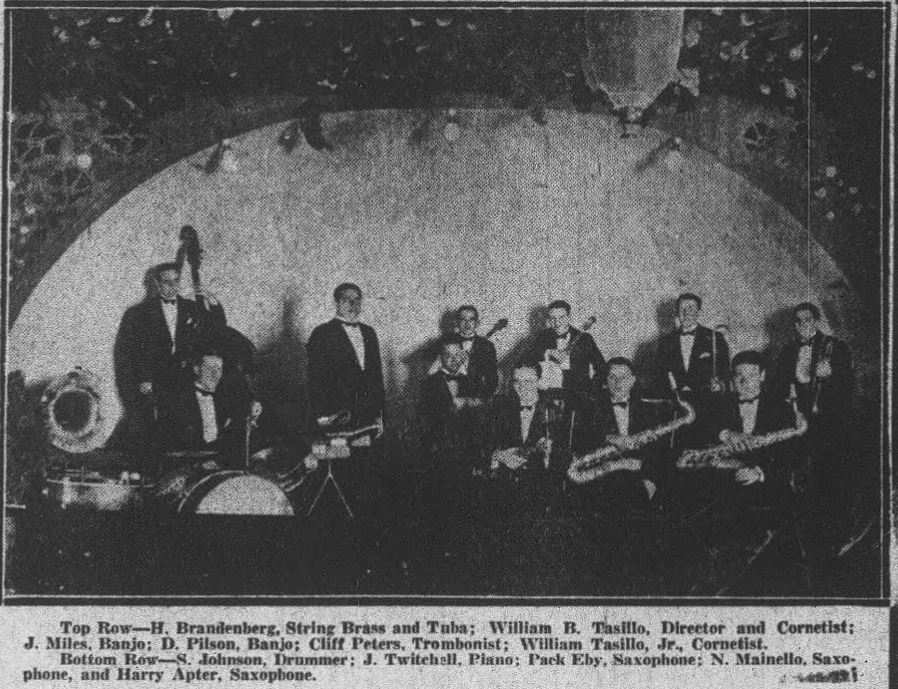
Bill Tasillo Jr. photographed with the first Le Bal Tabarin Orchestra in Miami, circa 1924

William's earliest engagements as a professional musician were with his father's bands in Hartford, including the Foot Guard Band, the Connecticut National Guard band and engagements with the first Le Bal Tabarin Orchestra of Hartford. He also played cornet with his father's Le Bal Tabarin Orchestra in the early 1920's during their winter engagements in Miami, Florida. For a stint around 1926, Tasillo played with Frank Winegar's Pennsylvanians, traveling the Midwest.

William J. Tasillo's first band was known as the Rainbow Collegiate Orchestra, playing weekly engagements for the Rainbow Dance Palace and Inn at Bolton, Connecticut by 1927. The Dance Palace was later renamed the College Inn, with Tasillo as manager in late 1931. Tasillo Jr. led the house band of Le Bal Tabarin in the opening of the second dance venue of that name in Hartford in December of 1927. Tasillo continued to lead the band at Le Bal Tabarin on Wells Street in Hartford until 1929. He also played in Bill Jones' Capitol Theatre Orchestra at Hartford during the late 1920's. Tasillo participated in a New England battle of the bands in 1927 held at the Cook's Butterfly Ballroom in Springfield, Massachusetts, placing second only behind Edwin J. McEnelly's Orchestra. Tasillo Jr. also played in McEnelly's orchestra around this time and played in Mal Hallett's Orchestra at the Arcadia Dance Hall for a season in New York City.

During the 1930s, Tasillo Jr. led a band aboard the 'Killarney Showboat', a floating restaurant and dance club on the Connecticut River. This band included Tasillo Jr. on trumpet, saxophonist and oboist Tom "Tommy" Macy alias Mace, trumpeter George Greenberg, and bassist Meyer "Mike" Rubin. Tasillo Jr. was also teaching trumpet lessons in the area by 1933. Tasillo frequented many other venues in Connecticut and Western Massachusetts during this time. In 1934, he played for the opening of the grill room at the former Highland Court Hotel in Hartford. He also played trumpet with Mike DeVito's band at the former Waverly Inn in Cheshire, Connecticut, and later with his own band from 1935 to 1938. He led this same band for three special Christmas fundraisers held at the former Poli's Theatre of Waterbury, Connecticut from 1935 to 1937 to benefit poor families in the city of Waterbury. By 1936, Tasillo's band theme song was "Red Sails in the Sunset", later adopting the title song from the 1937 film "Double or Nothing". Tasillo formed a new band in 1938 to play for an engagement at Wright's Tavern in Plainville, Connecticut. Members of his orchestra at this time included violinist and trumpeter Johnny Bond, bassist Tom Scully and other musicians from Connecticut and New York.

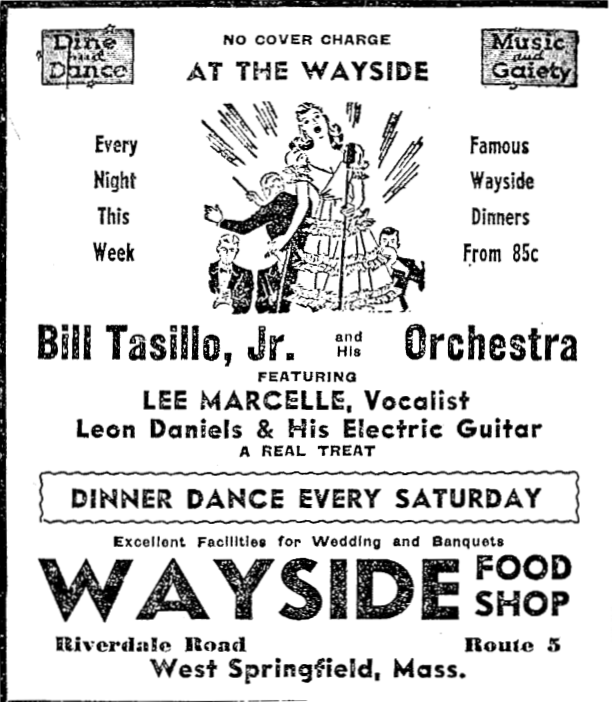
Advertisement for Bill Tasillo Jr.'s Orchestra at the West Springfield, MA Wayside restaurant, 1939

Tasillo was later a frequent performer at the former Wayside Restaurant in West Springfield, Massachusetts. He played with trumpeter and pianist Dick Cary in the fall of 1940 at The Wayside, who was his arranger at that time, and with lead vocalist Lorraine Barre. William also joined with the vocal group, The Three Debs, for a 30-week engagement at the Wayside Restaurant. Tasillo Jr. had engagements at other various venues popular with big bands of the swing era including the former Clayton Casino at Thousand Islands in Clayton, New York, the former Riley's Lake House in Saratoga Springs and the Raymor Ballroom in Boston. His orchestra was also offered a residency at the Kenmore Hotel in Albany in 1938. Briefly in December 1943, Tasillo led a group at the former Garde Hotel in Hartford with Gage Ambers alias D'Ambrosio and "Phil" Della Penna. Tasillo also played cornet with Hal McIntyre's orchestra around this time.

William J. Tasillo did not establish his own night club like his father until 1934. The night club was located in Middletown, Connecticut. Tasillo Jr. was the manager of the 'Wonder Bar' in that city, which offered live music and dancing. Members of his orchestra at that time included pianist John A. Nicolini and trumpeter Chuck "Tweet" Peterson. Tasillo later opened 'Bill Tasillo's Supper Club' in 1945, a nightclub and restaurant in Farmington, Connecticut, which he owned and operated.

== Final years and death ==
Bill Tasillo Jr. was the sole owner of the Supper Club, which in addition to serving as a restaurant was a well known spot in northern Connecticut for live jazz music from 1945 until his death in 1947 (not to be confused with William B. Tasillo, d.1945). Many former big band musicians played with Tasillo at the Supper Club including Vaughn Monroe's pianist, Al Doddis. The Supper Club was briefly operated by his widow and heirs into the late 1940s and early 1950s.
