= The Liberty Bell (march) =

American military march composed by John Philip Sousa

"The Liberty Bell" (1893) is an American military march composed by John Philip Sousa. The march's title was inspired by the spectacle "America", where a backdrop depicting Liberty Bell was lowered. The march was originally written for Sousa's uncompleted operetta "The Devil's Deputy". The march was played at 5 of the last 7 United States presidential inaugurations, and was also notably used as the opening theme for Monty Python's Flying Circus.

"The Liberty Bell"
Performance by The New York Military Band c. 1910

"The Liberty Bell"
Performance by the United States Marine Band c. 2016

== History ==
"The Liberty Bell", at the time a new composition as yet untitled, was written for Sousa's unfinished operetta "The Devil's Deputy" before financing for the show fell through. Shortly afterwards, while attending the Columbian Exposition in Chicago, Sousa and his band manager George Hinton watched the spectacle "America", in which a backdrop depicting the Liberty Bell was lowered. Hinton suggested "The Liberty Bell" for the title of Sousa's unnamed march. Coincidentally, Sousa received a letter from his wife saying their son had marched in a parade in honor of the Liberty Bell. Sousa agreed, and he sold "The Liberty Bell" sheet music to the John Church Company for publication; the new march was an immediate success. The march is played as part of an exhibit in the Liberty Bell Center.

The United States Marine Band has played "The Liberty Bell" march at five of the last seven presidential inaugurations: the 1993 inauguration of President Bill Clinton, the 2005 inauguration of President George W. Bush, the 2009 and 2013 inaugurations of President Barack Obama, and the 2017 and 2025 inaugurations of President Donald Trump.

The ship's bell from the SS John Philip Sousa, a World War II Liberty ship, is housed at the Marine Barracks and is used by The President's Own in select performances of the march.

"The Liberty Bell" is also the official march of the Canadian Forces Public Affairs Branch.

== Composition ==
The march follows Sousa's "extended" trio form: "HEAD (intro, 1st strain, 2nd strain), TRIO (trio A), interlude, Triumphal return (trio B + final trio)", which since the Liberty Bell has become a standard for military marches. The trio uses tubular bells to symbolize the Liberty Bell ringing.

== Instrumentation ==
The march is scored for 2 flutes, 2 oboes, 2 clarinets, 2 bassoons, 4 horns, 2 trumpets, 3 trombones, tuba, timpani, cymbals, bass drum, snare drum, and strings.

The bell used by The President's Own when performing the march is the ship's bell cast for the Liberty Ship John Philip Sousa in World War II.

== Use in Monty Python's Flying Circus ==
A version of the march, performed by the Band of the Grenadier Guards and published in 1967, was used as the opening theme of the British TV comedy program Monty Python's Flying Circus (1969–1974). Cast member Terry Gilliam, the only American member of the troupe, argued for the use of "The Liberty Bell" because it had fallen into the public domain by that time and could thus be used without the need to pay royalties. He has said the piece was chosen because the troupe thought it would not be associated with the program's content, and that the first bell strike and subsequent melody would give the impression of getting "straight down to business."

The Monty Python mode of presenting the tune was with a single strike of the bell, lifted from the third section and increased in volume, followed by a strain of each of the first two sections, followed by the famous stomping foot animation and a noticeably flatulent "splat" sound reminiscent of a whoopee cushion (the first 13 episodes used a "raspberry"). At the end of the film Monty Python Live at the Hollywood Bowl, the entire march was played over the closing credits.

== Other uses ==
NASA played the march as wake-up calls for two Space Shuttle missions: STS-61-C on January 12–18, 1986, and STS-63 on February 3–11, 1995.

SpaceX used the march as background music for their video How Not to Land an Orbital Rocket Booster, a compilation of failed rocket landings to celebrate their attempts to develop reusable orbital launch vehicles.

== See also ==
- List of marches by John Philip Sousa
- "Chimes of Liberty" by Edwin Franko Goldman
