= Samuel Miller =

Samuel Miller may refer to:

- Samuel Miller (theologian) (1769–1850), professor at Princeton Theological Seminary and author of The Ruling Elder (1831)
- Samuel Miller (musician), American trumpeter
- Samuel Miller (writer), American novelist and screenwriter
- Samuel F. Miller (1827–1892), U.S. representative from New York
- Samuel Freeman Miller (1816–1890), associate justice of the United States Supreme Court
  - Justice Samuel Freeman Miller House, listed on the National Register of Historic Places in Iowa
- Samuel H. Miller (1840–1918), U.S. representative from Pennsylvania
- Samuel Stephens Miller, member of the Wisconsin State Assembly
- Samuel Miller, 19th century Virginian benefactor of The Miller School of Albemarle
- Samuel Augustine Miller (1819–1890), Confederate congressman
- Samuel J. Miller (1888–1958), builder and carpenter in Carmel-by-the-Sea, California
- Sammy Miller (born 1933), motorcycle racer from Northern Ireland
- Samuel Bode Miller (born 1977), American alpine skier
- Sammy Miller (rugby league), English rugby league footballer who played in the 1920s, 1930s and 1940s
- Sammy Miller (engineer), dragster and funny car builder in the 1970s and 1980s
- Samuel Miller (saw), one claimant to have invented the circular saw in 1777
- Samuel Miller (USMC) (1775–1855), officer in the United States Marine Corps

== See also ==
- Sam Miller (disambiguation)
- Samuel Christy-Miller (1810–1889), English businessman and politician
