= Ernest Williams =

Ernest Williams may refer to:

- Ernest Calvin Williams (1887–1940), United States Marine Corps officer
- Ernest Williams (conductor) (1881–1947), American band conductor
- Ernest Williams (footballer) (1882–1943), English footballer
- Ernest Edward Williams (1914–1998), American herpetologist
- Ernest Edwin Williams (1866–1935), Welsh journalist, author and barrister
- Ernest S. Williams (minister) (1885–1981), General Superintendent of the Assemblies of God
- Ernest Hillas Williams (1899–1965), Irish judge and British Empire colonial official
- Ernest Williams (politician), Antiguan politician

== See also ==
- Earnest Williams (born 1949), American politician
- Earnest Williams, African-American man who was lynched by a mob in 1908, see Lynching of Earnest Williams
