= James F. Burke =

James F. Burke may refer to:

- James F. Burke (politician) (1867–1932), United States Representative from Pennsylvania
- James F. Burke (musician) (1923–1981), American cornet soloist
