= Goldman Band =

American concert band which performed in New York City

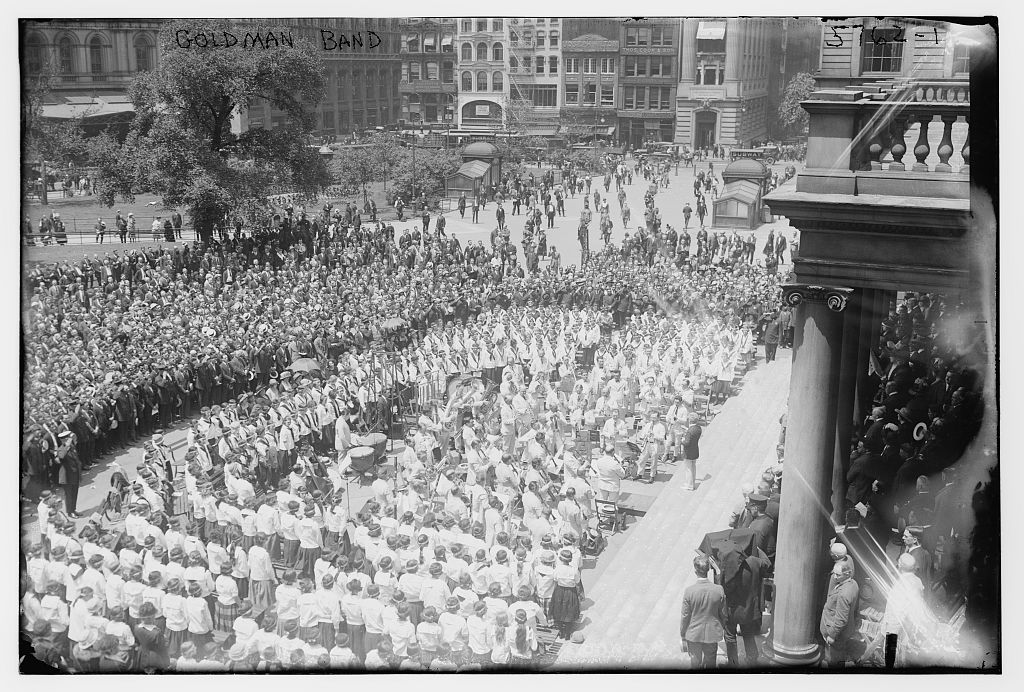
- The Goldman Band circa 1922

Background information
- Origin: New York City, U.S.
- Genre: Concert band
- Years active: 1918–2005
- Labels: Victor Records; Decca; Columbia
- Past members: Edwin Franko Goldman Richard Franko Goldman

The Goldman Band was an American concert band founded in 1918 by Edwin Franko Goldman from his previous New York Military Band. Both bands were based in New York City.

It was Goldman's contention that the New York symphony and orchestra musicians in the summer bands of the time, rarely rehearsed and did not take these performances very seriously. He saw the potential for starting a really good wind ensemble.

The Goldman Band's first concert under that name was in 1920 at Columbia University. The program was representative of Goldman's choices in transcriptions and original works including compositions of Johann Sebastian Bach, Victor Herbert, Edward MacDowell, Johan Svendsen, Ambroise Thomas, Richard Wagner, and Karl Michael Ziehrer.

For ninety-three years the Goldman Band performed free public concerts at a variety of venues in New York City, including on the Green at Columbia, Central Park, Prospect Park, and at the Guggenheim Bandshell at Lincoln Center. Famous instrumental and vocal performers appeared with the band along with guest conductors such as Percy Grainger and Vivian Dunn. Traditional and classical works were performed as well as new works for band. Goldman requested new works for band from European composers including Ottorino Respighi, Albert Roussel, and Jaromir Weinberger. With professional musicians and endowment funds from the Guggenheim Foundation, the band was able to perform in New York and also tour the U.S. and Canada and perform on radio and television.

The Goldman Band was widely considered the successor to the John Philip Sousa band. Many of Sousa's musicians went on to play with the Goldman Band including Henry Heidelberg (piccolo); Johnny Carr, Raymond Scott, Emil Preiss and Joseph Chaney (clarinet); Del Staigers, Oscar B. Short and George Fee (cornet); Wayne Lewis (euphonium) and William Bell (tuba player).

In 1983, the Guggenheim Foundation withdrew funding to concentrate on social justice issues, and the band had to start fundraising from other sources, and shortened their season to 35 concerts over a seven-week period.

== Conductors after Edwin Franko Goldman ==
After Goldman's death at age 78 in 1956, his son, Richard Franko Goldman, took the podium until 1979; the year before his death in 1980. Ainslee Cox served as co-conductor with Goldman beginning in 1968, and was sole conductor of the band from 1979 until his death in 1988. Gene Young succeeded Cox as director until 1997. He was followed by David Eaton (1997-2000), and the last conductor was Christian Wilhjelm.

== Premieres ==
The Goldman Band had a long history of premiering notable new works by composers. The Goldman Band gave the first complete performance of Percy Grainger's composition Lincolnshire Posy in the summer of 1937. The first performance of Darius Milhaud’s Suite française was performed by the Goldman Band on June 13, 1945. The first performance of Arnold Schoenberg's Theme and Variations for Full Band, was performed by the Band on June 27, 1946, with Richard Franko Goldman conducting. On June 23, 1947 the band and a chorus of 200 performed the American premiere of Hector Berlioz’s Grande symphonie funèbre et triomphale. The band premiered Robert Russell Bennett's Rose Variations for cornet and band with James F. Burke as the cornet soloist in 1955. The band also premiered Bennett's last major composition for band, Autobiography, on June 22, 1977.

The band made numerous recordings for Capitol Records, American Decca, RCA Victrola, and New World Records.

== Instrumentation ==
Instrumentation between 1930–1956, when the band consisted of 64 members, was four flutes, two oboes, one E-flat clarinet, one bass clarinet, nineteen clarinets (eight firsts, six seconds, five thirds), two alto saxophones, one tenor saxophone, one baritone saxophone, two bassoons, four cornets, four trumpets, five French horns, six trombones, two euphoniums, four tubas, two string basses, one harp, and three percussionists.

== Cornet and trumpet soloists ==
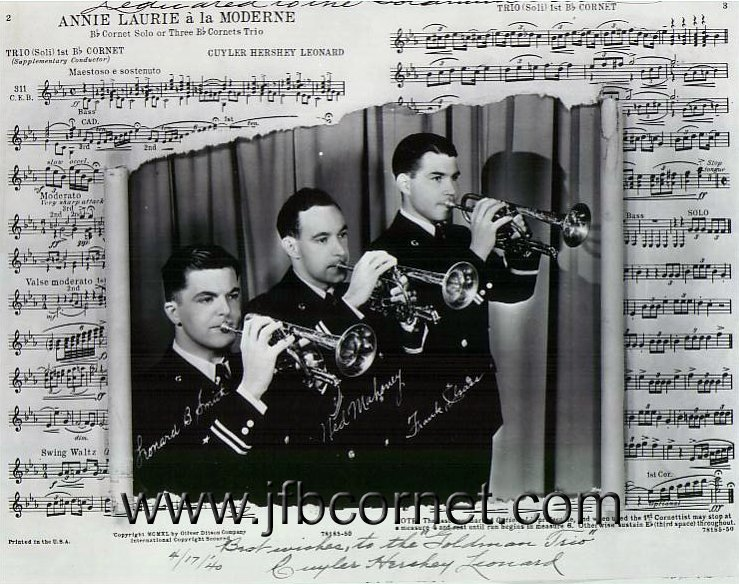
The Three Aces

Cornet solos were a featured attraction at most Goldman Band concerts.

Principle cornet soloists during the band's early years included

- Ernest Williams (1918-1922)
- Vincent Buono (1923)
- Waino Kauppi (1924-1926)
- Del Staigers(1926-1934)
- Leonard B. Smith(1934-1941)
- David Rosebrook (1935)
- Del Staigers (1942)
- James F. Burke (1943-1974)
- Sid Baker (Sydney Beckerman) (1975)
- Frank Hosticka (1976-2005)

Assistant cornet soloists include:

- Vincent Buono (1919-1922)
- Jacob Hager (1921)
- Carl Maurer (1921-1929)
- Mr. Distel (1926)
- Samuel Miller (1927-1929)
- Oscar B. Short (1930-1934)
- George Fee (1930-1936)
- Stewart Grow (1932)
- Frank Elsass (1934-1940)
- John "Ned" Mahoney (1937-1962)
- Raymond Crisara (1941-1942)
- Sid Baker (Sydney Beckerman) (1971-1974)
- Donald Benedetti (1967-1969) (Cornet and Trumpet Soloist)
- Kirby Jolly (1971-1973)
- Vincent DiDea (1977-1985)
- Douglas Hedwig (1980-1985)

Guest cornet soloists include:

- Leona May Smith (1932)
- Pietro Capodiferro (1935)
- Leona May Smith(1940)
- Edna White (1949)
- Carol Abbe (1974)
- Frank Schimonelli (1976) (Post Horn Soloist)

By 1960, Richard Franko Goldman began to use trumpet soloists in addition to cornet soloists. These soloists include:

- Mel Broiles(1960-1964)
- Jack Holland (1965-1966)
- Donald Benedetti (1967-1969)
- Jack Laumer (1972-1974)
- Ralph Schwartz (1978)
- Mel Broiles (1980)

In addition, cornet trios (and the occasional quartet or brass quintet) were also featured at many Goldman Band concerts. The trio of Leonard B. Smith, Frank Elsass and John "Ned" Mahoney were known as "The Three Aces".

== Cessation of operations ==
In April 2005, negotiations between the band's negotiating committee and the board of directors broke down after the committee failed to get an extension to play at their Memorial Day concert. The board of directors presented various offers with other band members; among them was a proposal to remove five musicians from the band to 48 players. According to then-secretary Mark Heter, the reduction "would not have cut any of the band's 45 tenured posts." The offer also included removing musicians from the board of directors, as well as eliminating the season guarantee from their concerts. However, the committee declined their offer on May 22. Five days later, on May 27, the Goldman Band ceased operations, ending 87 years of service.
