= Lincoln Holroyd =

English-American cornet soloist (1881–1961)

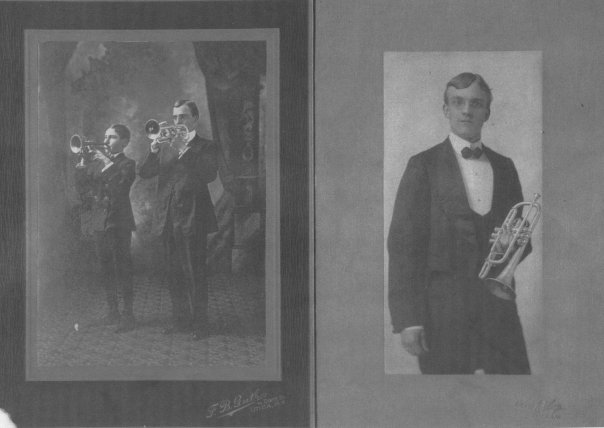

Lincoln Holroyd (May 9, 1881 – February 12, 1961) was an English-American cornet player. He was cornet soloist with Arthur Pryor and Patrick Conway, and appeared with the John Philip Sousa Band. He was an active performer, band leader and music educator in Utica, N.Y., from 1905 until his death in 1961.

== Early life ==
Lincoln was the son of wool sorter Edwin Holroyd and grandson of the poet Abraham Holroyd of Bradford, England (April 2, 1815 – January 1, 1888). Abraham's efforts were endorsed by wool manufacturer Titus Salt.

Lincoln Holroyd was born in Bradford, England, and emigrated to Bordentown New Jersey at age 12. Leaving School at 15, he supported himself by working in stores while studying music and at 20 joined the Third Regiment Band of New Jersey. (Ziyara Bugle, February 1961).

Holroyd moved to Utica, NY, in 1905 upon the invitation of Franz Rath.

== Cornet soloist ==
Lincoln Holroyd's performing career was profiled in the Utica Observer on March 25, 1916:

Prof. Lincoln Holroyd, the well known bandmaster and cornet soloist has been engaged for his third season as conductor of the Fort Dayton Band at Herkimer. The band under his direction, gives a concert every Friday night throughout the summer, commencing in June.

Prof. Holroyd has been one of Utica's most active musicians for a number of years past. He is the conductor of the Municipal Band, the cornetist at the Avon Theatre, and the instructor and conductor of the children's band at the Masonic Home.

As a soloist, Prof. Holroyd enjoys a splendid reputation. Through recommendation of Prof. Franz Rath, he was engaged as assistant soloist of the Denver Municipal Band of which Pat Conway, conductor of the famous Conway's Band, was soloist and Enrico Garguilo was conductor. He assisted Mr. Conway in the making of his first phonograph records.

For three years he was the soloist of the Third Regiment Band of New Jersey; for two seasons he was soloist for Wilson's Band which played for the carnival during State Fair Week. He has also been a member of the Lyceum Theatre Orchestra in Rochester under George Koehl, the director of the late Schubert Theater String Orchestra.

For three years Prof. Holroyd was cornetist of Young's Pier Theatre Orchestra at Atlantic City and he was encouraged to come to this city by B. A. Rolfe, who's musical sketches are the gems of Keith vaudeville and are known throughout the United States.

Prof. Holroyd was elected president of the local branch of the American Federation of Musicians at its last annual meeting and there is no other better equipped for the place. He enjoys a wide acquaintance in Utica and various other cities where he has played and his artistic musicianship is appreciated by thousands of people.

His work as cornetist in the local first class theatres has brought him in contact with many musicians. Besides being a real musician, Prof. Holroyd is gifted with a genial disposition and the faculty of making friends. He is a teacher of considerable reputation and in numerous ways has made his part in music affairs interesting.

— Who's Who In Musical Utica - Prof. Lincoln Holroyd, Cornet Soloist, Conductor and Theatre Musician, Utica Observer

The following excerpt from the "Catalogue of the Utica Conservatory of Music 1922-1923" places him as the Brass Instructor at the Conservatory and cornet soloist at the Majestic Theater (both posts formerly occupied by B.A. Rolfe).

Mr. Holroyd was for three years soloist with the Third Regiment Band of New Jersey, three years cornet soloist at Young's Pier, Atlantic City, and since residing in Utica, was cornet soloist with the Majestic Theater Orchestra, under the direction of Franz Rath. For some time he occupied the position as assistant solo cornet with Pat Conway's famous band.

— Catalogue of the Utica Conservatory of Music 1922-1923

Herbert L. Clarke, cornet soloist of the John Philip Sousa Band, was entertained by Holroyd while in the city of Utica for two performances at the Majestic Theater.

== Band director/organizer ==
In May 1921, Holroyd joined Utica Shriner's Ziyara Temple and began to organize a band. He held the position of band leader for 40 years until retiring from the post on February 2, 1961.

Among the bands he directed and organized were the Utica Free Academy, Proctor High School, Ziyara Shrine Temple, Boy's Club and The Masonic Home Band.

On August 1, 1924, Holroyd's Municipal Band was filmed on Genesee Street in a silent movie titled Clothes, directed by A.J. Cunningham.

== Death ==
Lincoln remained active as a band director and performer until his death. According to the Ziyara Bugle, he attended morning rehearsal, "directed the Band for the first selection and then finished the entire rehearsal in the ranks".

Later that evening, he suffered a heart attack and died on Sunday, February 12, 1961, aged 79.
