= David Rosebrook =

American musician (1874–1937)

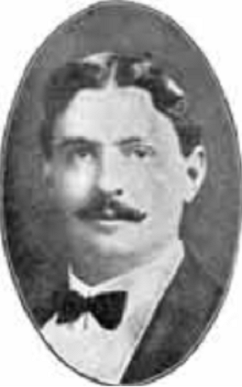

Background information
- Born: David Cobb Rosebrook; January 19, 1874; Portland, Maine, U.S.
- Died: March 31, 1937 (aged 63) Oakland, California
- Genres: Concert band Orchestra
- Occupation: Musician
- Instruments: Cornet, trumpet
- Years active: 1899–1935

David Cobb Rosebrook (January 19, 1874 – March 31, 1937) was an American cornet soloist, trumpeter, composer and conductor. He was the principal trumpet with the San Francisco Symphony from 1912 to 1919, and the principal cornet soloist with the Goldman Band in 1935.

== Performance career ==
Rosebrook began his career as a cornet player in New York and Boston. He moved to San Francisco in 1899. When Henry Ohlmeyer took his band on a tour of West Coast cities during the early summer of 1910, Rosebrook was his cornet soloist and Herbert L. Clarke was the "special soloist". From 1911 to 1912, he was the assistant principal trumpet with the San Francisco Symphony. He became principal trumpet in 1912 and remained in that position through 1919. From 1916 to 1925 he was the cornet soloist with the Golden Gate Band under the direction of Paul Steindrof and he also played many solo engagements with the Oakland Municipal Band during the 1920s.

Rosebrook was the conductor of the Islam Shrine Band from 1919 to 1925. In 1930, Rosebrook returned to the San Francisco Symphony as second trumpet, and he remained in that position through 1935, when the orchestra was suspended. On occasion, he conducted the orchestra.

In 1935, Rosebrook was hired by Edwin Franko Goldman to be his cornet soloist in the Goldman Band, replacing Del Staigers. During this summer season, he performed several original compositions. After playing for about five weeks, Rosebrook became ill and returned home to San Francisco. This was his last professional engagement.
