= Leonard B. Smith (musician) =

American musician (1915–2002)

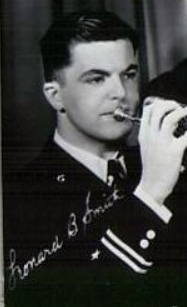

Background information
- Born: Leonard Bingley Smith; September 5, 1915; Poughkeepsie, New York, U.S.
- Died: July 23, 2002 (aged 86) Scottsdale, Arizona, U.S.
- Genres: Concert band, orchestra
- Occupation: Musician
- Instruments: Cornet, trumpet
- Years active: 1936–1955 (Cornet, trumpet); 1946–1991 (Conductor)
- Label: Victor Records

Leonard Bingley Smith (September 5, 1915 – July 23, 2002) was an American cornet soloist, conductor, and composer.

== Early life ==
Smith was born in Poughkeepsie, New York. He began to study cornet at the age of eight. After three years of study, he was sent to Ernest Williams, with whom he studied for ten years.

== Career ==
Smith was the principal cornet soloist with the Goldman Band from 1936 to 1941. He was also the principal trumpet with The Detroit Symphony Orchestra from 1937 to 1942. He was the founder and conductor of the Detroit Concert Band from 1946 to 1991.

== Discography ==
- Artist Awards Series - Leonard Smith Plays The Cornet (1960) [AAS-701]

== Published works ==
Cornet/Trumpet Solos

- "Spanish Caprice" (1936) Charles Colin
- "Ecstasy" (1938) Carl Fischer Inc.
- "Venture" (1962) First Division Publishing
- "Tall Men" (1968) Belwin Mills Publishing Corp.
- "Road Runner" (1973) Belwin Mills Publishing Corp.
- Valse "Au Printemps" (1973) Belwin Mills Publishing Corp.
- "Chamade" (1973) Belwin Mills Publishing Corp.
- "Nelda" (1973) Belwin Mills Publishing Corp.
- "The Three Troubadors" (Trumpet Trio) (1978) Belwin Mills Publishing Corp.
- "Apollo" (1980) Belwin Mills Publishing Corp.
