= Sam Franko =

American violinist and conductor

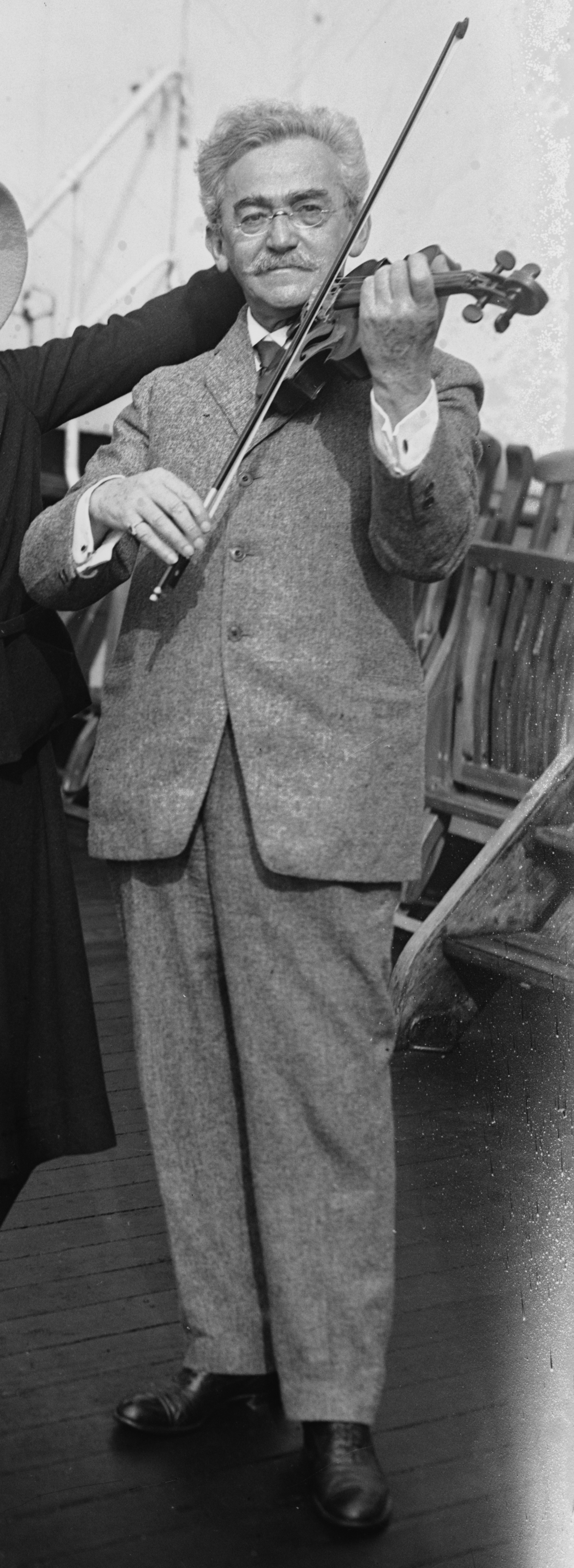
- Born: January 20, 1857; New Orleans, Louisiana, United States
- Died: May 6, 1937 (aged 80); New York City, United States
- Occupation: musician & conductor
- Relatives: Nahan Franko (brother)

Sam Franko (January 20, 1857 – May 6, 1937) was an American violinist and conductor. He was the brother of violinist, conductor and concert promoter Nahan Franko.

A native of New Orleans, Franko studied the violin in Europe, working with Joseph Joachim and Henri Vieuxtemps among others. Upon his return to the United States he joined the Mendelssohn Quartet, later working with the Theodore Thomas Orchestra and the New York Philharmonic. Franko soon grew disgusted with prejudice against American musicians, and created the American Symphony, made up entirely of American performers, in 1894. With this group he gave many American premieres. Franko also taught violin and arranged 17th- and 18th-century music, and transcribed numerous pieces for the violin. His work with old music won him accolades from the German press. His autobiography, Chords and Discords, was published in 1938, and he died in New York City in 1937.

The set of cadenzas he wrote for Mozart's Violin Concerto in G-major K. 216 has become a standard part of the concert repertoire, more so than all of the numerous other cadenzas that have been written for this piece.

== Bibliography ==
- David Ewen, Encyclopedia of Concert Music. New York; Hill and Wang, 1959.
