= On the Mall =

1923 march composed by Edwin Franko Goldman

"On the Mall" is a famous march composed by American bandmaster Edwin Franko Goldman (1878–1956). It vies with Goldman's "Chimes of Liberty" as his two most popular compositions. As indicated by Jack Kopstein, it (as of 2013) remains a featured march and continues to be performed and recorded by bands throughout America and around the world.

It was premiered on the Naumburg Orchestral Concerts at the Naumburg Bandshell opening concert, Sept. 26, 1923.

== Publication history ==
The score of "On the Mall" was first published in 1923 by Carl Fischer LLC. A version edited by Edward S. Lisk is frequently used. Goldman wrote a number of marches whose titles begin with words On the, with the first being "On the Green" in 1920.

== Meaning of title ==
The phrase "On the Mall" refers to the Mall in Central Park, New York City, where Goldman's Band frequently performed. Goldman composed "On the Mall" possibly as early as 1922, but published the march in 1923 to honor Elkan Naumburg, who funded the construction of the new Naumburg Bandshell. "On the Mall" premiered there on September 29, 1923, with Franz Kaltenborn as conductor and Naumburg in attendance.

== Singing, whistling, lyricizing ==
In a technique identified with Goldman, the trio (third strain) is predominantly sung by the band members and then repeated, after a breakstrain, with whistling. A great believer in public participation as Goldman toured with his band in countless venues, he encouraged audiences likewise in "On the Mall" to sing along and then whistle with the band. Audience clapping in sync with the score is also common. The concluding strain of the march can be sung with lyrics written by Goldman's wife Adelaide Maibrunn Goldman. To reinforce the physical setting and the title, renditions have been known to substitute the words On the Mall in lieu of some of the lyrics.
