= Sam Miller (disambiguation) =

Sam Miller is an English television director.

Sam Miller may also refer to:

- Sam Miller (cricketer) (born 1988), Australian cricketer
- Sam Miller (journalist) (born 1962), journalist and writer
- Sam J. Miller, science fiction author
- Sam Miller (businessman) (1921-2019), American businessman
- Sam Miller (comedian), American comedian

== See also ==
- Samuel Miller (disambiguation)
- Sam Millar, crime writer
