= Chimes of Liberty =

Military march by Edwin Franko Goldman

"Chimes of Liberty"
Performed by the Concert Band of the United States Air Force Heritage of America Band

"Chimes of Liberty" is a military march by Edwin Franko Goldman (1878–1956). It vies with "On the Mall" (another march) as Goldman's greatest hit.

Many think "Chimes of Liberty" is a re-working of "The Liberty Bell" by John Philip Sousa; however, although the influence of Sousa on Goldman is unquestionable, the two marches are totally different, being written by different composers, each with a different tone. Nonetheless (like Sousa's "Liberty Bell") Goldman's "Chimes of Liberty" does use chimes. It follows the regular march pattern: IAABBCDCDC. This march was written prior to 1922, when Goldman recorded it for the Victor Talking Machine Company, but he revised it at least once before publishing the 1937 edition now largely in use.

== Reception ==
At a concert at Columbia University on June 12, 1922, Goldman agreed to perform his new march, "Chimes of Liberty", as an encore by special request. According to Musical Courier, it "proved to be a composition of a stirring nature. Its presentation was so enthusiastically applauded that the composer-conductor found it necessary to repeat it."
