= Patrick Conway =

American bandleader (1865–1929)

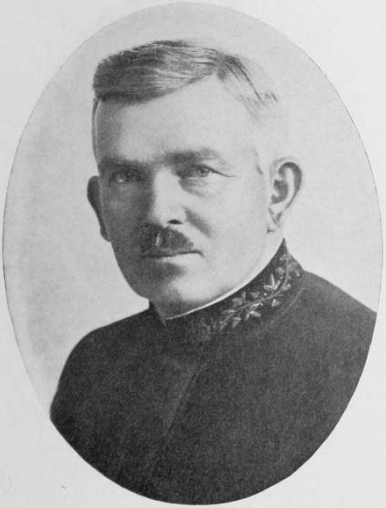
- Born: July 4, 1865; Troy, New York, US
- Died: June 10, 1929 (aged 63); Ithaca, New York, US
- Occupation: Bandleader

Patrick Conway (July 4, 1865 – June 10, 1929) was a prominent American bandleader during the golden era of professional bands. He often was referred to as Pat Conway or Patsy Conway.

== Early life ==
Conway was born in Troy, New York, but moved to Homer, New York as an infant. He learned to play cornet as a young man while working in a carriage factory, joining the popular Homer Cornet Band and eventually becoming leader of the Cortland Band.

== The Ithaca Band ==
After a successful appearance by the Cortland Band at the 1894 Central New York Volunteer Fireman’s Association convention in Ithaca, New York, Conway was recruited by the judges (including music educator Hollis Dann) to relocate to Ithaca in 1895. He served as director of the Cornell University Cadet Band (predecessor of the Cornell Big Red Marching Band) from 1895 to 1908. He also began teaching students at the new Ithaca Conservatory of Music (predecessor of Ithaca College) at a time when teaching band music and brass instruments was uncommon.

Conway formed the Ithaca Band in 1895 and brought the ensemble to national popularity and acclaim. By around 1910, the ensemble came to be known as Conway's Band or Patrick Conway and His Famous Band. In Ithaca, they had a standing contract with the trolley company to perform at Stewart Park (then Renwick Park), but extensive tours brought them around the country to the St. Louis World's Fair, Canadian National Exhibition, Cincinnati Zoo, Corn Palace, Willow Grove Park, the Pan-American Exposition, Atlantic City, Oaks Amusement Park, and the Panama-Pacific Exposition.

Many members of Conway's band had substantial success beyond the band, such as Lincoln Holroyd, Getty H. Huffine, Ernest Williams. Conway and the Ithaca Band made many recordings on the Victor and Edison labels. In 1927, they played on the premiere of the General Motors Family Hour radio show.

In the stage and film productions of The Music Man, set in 1912, character Harold Hill mentions Conway in the introduction to "Seventy-Six Trombones" alongside other famous bandleaders like Patrick Gilmore and John Philip Sousa. All three were inaugural members of the National Band Association Hall of Fame of Distinguished Band Conductors in 1980.

== Conway Military Band School ==
In 1922, sensing the waning popularity of professional bands, Conway founded the Conway Military Band School in affiliation with the Ithaca Conservatory of Music. It was among the first schools of its kind in the country. Students included George S. Howard (first director of the U.S. Air Force Band) and Les Brown (noted bandleader). Conway led the school until his death in Ithaca on June 10, 1929, following a prostate operation. The school was merged into Ithaca College in 1931 and laid the foundation for the college's strong band tradition.

== Other work ==
When not touring with the Ithaca Band, Conway conducted the Syracuse Symphony Orchestra from 1910 to 1916 and also led the pit orchestra for a theater in Syracuse. In World War I, he received a captain's commission and led musical activity for the United States Army Air Service while at Camp MacArthur in Waco, Texas. This was the first band program for the predecessor of the United States Air Force.
