= Samuel Miller (musician) =

American trumpeter

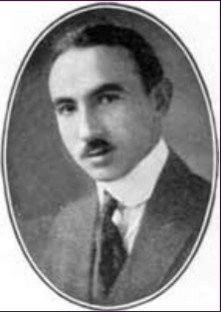
- Samuel Miller

Background information
- Born: Samuel Miller; September 16, 1891; Russia
- Genre: Concert Band Orchestra
- Occupation: Musician
- Instruments: Cornet, Trumpet
- Years active: 1918-1934

Samuel Miller (September 16, 1891 – ????) was an American trumpeter. He was the principal trumpet with the New York Symphony from 1918 to 1919, the San Francisco Symphony from 1919 to 1921, the Cleveland Orchestra for the 1920–1921 season, and the Detroit Symphony for the 1921–1922 season. He played trumpet and cornet with The Goldman Band for several seasons in 1920; from 1927 to 1929; in 1931 and again in 1934.

== Early life ==
Miller was born September 16, 1891, in Russia.
