= USS Orestes =

Tender of the United States Navy

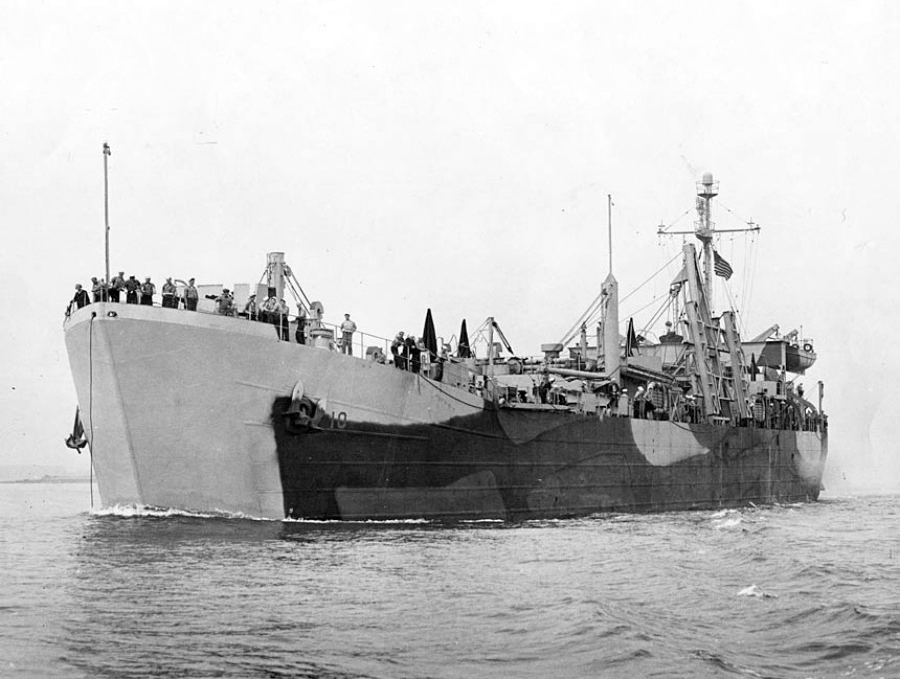
- USS Orestes underway off Port Covington, Baltimore, Maryland, on 11 May 1944

History

United States
- Name: USS Orestes
- Namesake: Orestes, in Greek mythology the son of Agamemnon who avenged his father's death even though it meant slaying his mother, Clytemnestra.
- Builder: Chicago Bridge and Iron Company, Seneca, Illinois; Converted to motor torpedo boat tender by Maryland Drydock Company, Baltimore, Maryland
- Laid down: 8 July 1943
- Launched: 16 November 1943
- Commissioned: 25 April 1944
- Decommissioned: 29 April 1946
- Renamed: USS Orestes prior to completion, sometime between November 1943 and April 1944 (had been laid down as USS LST-135)
- Reclassified: From landing ship tank LST-135 to motor torpedo boat tender AGP-10 sometime between November 1943 and April 1944
- Stricken: 23 April 1947
- Honors and awards: Two battle stars for her World War II service
- Fate: Transferred to Maritime Commission 15 March 1948 and sold for scrapping

General characteristics
- Class & type: Varuna-class motor torpedo boat tender, converted during construction from a landing ship tank
- Displacement: 3,960 tons
- Length: 328 ft (100 m)
- Beam: 50 ft (15 m)
- Draft: 11 ft 2 in (3.40 m)
- Speed: 11.6 knots
- Complement: 341
- Armament: 1 × 3 in (76 mm) gun; 8 × 40 mm antiaircraft guns; 12 × 20 mm antiaircraft guns

USS Orestes (AGP-10) was a motor torpedo boat tender that served in the United States Navy from 1944 to 1946.

Orestes was laid down as landing ship tank USS LST–135 at Chicago Bridge and Iron Company, Seneca, Illinois, on 8 July 1943, and launched on 16 November 1943, sponsored by Mrs. Bernard Sharp. Prior to completion, she was converted into a motor torpedo boat tender at Maryland Drydock Company, Baltimore, Maryland. Redesignated AGP-10, she was commissioned as USS Orestes (AGP–10) on 25 April 1944.

Successfully concluding her shakedown out of Hampton Roads, Virginia, on 23 May 1944, Orestes prepared for World War II duty in the Pacific. Departing the Chesapeake Bay on 5 June 1944, she transited the Panama Canal and, after a stop-over at Bora Bora, sailed on to New Guinea. She began motor torpedo boat tending operations at Aitape on 23 August 1944, transferred to Mios Woendi a month later, and on 12 November 1944 joined General Douglas MacArthur's Philippines invasion forces at Leyte. In the Leyte area control of the air was still disputed and Japanese air attacks were numerous. On 24 November 1944 Orestes' gunners got their first confirmed kills, two Mitsubishi A6M "Zeke" (Zero) fighters.

Late on 4 December 1944, while Orestes was in a Mindoro-bound convoy designated "Uncle plus 15" with 30 patrol torpedo boats (PT boats) and 50 other vessels, Japanese planes made life tenuous. On 30 December 1944, an Aichi D3A "Val" dive bomber came in low on the starboard side and crashed into Orestes amidships, causing heavy damage and killing 45 members of her crew. In a series of sweeps by boat PT-350, commanded by Lieutenant Thomas A. Dent (USNR), about 70 men were rescued from the burning Orestes. Fifteen more were plucked from the sea. Lieutenant Dent was awarded the Navy and Marine Corps Medal for heroism in the saving of the lives of American Naval personnel in action. Accompanying landing craft infantry (LCIs) finally brought the resulting fires under control and Orestes was beached. Landing ship tank USS LST-708 later towed Orestes back to Leyte on 27 January 1945, and after temporary repairs Orestes departed Leyte on 24 February 1945 on a slow voyage back to the United States, arriving at Terminal Island, California, on 13 May 1945. There shipyard personnel went to work and 202,500 man-hours of labor later they had completely rejuvenated Orestes.

Orestes departed the United States on a second trip to the Pacific war zone on 8 August 1945, but the war with Japan ended on 15 August 1945 and the Japanese surrender had been formalized (on 2 September 1945) by the time she reached Guinan Harbor, Samar, in the Philippines. Orestes served under the Commander Motor Torpedo Boats, Philippine Sea Frontier, until 17 December 1945, when she sailed eastward with naval passengers for Pearl Harbor, Hawaii, and the United States, arriving at San Pedro, California, on 3 February 1946.

Orestes made a month-long round trip to the Panama Canal Zone, then was deactivated. She decommissioned on 29 April 1946 at Oakland, California, and was struck from the Navy List on 23 April 1947. She was transferred to the Maritime Commission on 15 March 1948 and then was sold to the Walter W. Johnson Company of San Francisco for scrapping.

Orestes received two battle stars for her World War II service.
