= Earle Howard =

Earle Howard may refer to:

- Earle Howard (musician), American jazz pianist
- Earle Howard (politician), member of the Indiana House of Representatives

== See also ==
- Earl Howard, American avant-garde composer
- Earl Howard (baseball), American baseball pitcher
