= Leona May Smith =

American musician

- Leona May Smith, from a 1951 newspaper.
- Born: September 23, 1914; Bridgeport, Connecticut
- Died: December 1, 1999 (aged 85)
- Occupation: Musician

Leona May Smith (September 23, 1914 – December 1, 1999) was an American musician, a trumpeter and cornetist, based in New York City for most of her career.

== Early life ==
Leona May Smith was born in Bridgeport, Connecticut, the daughter of Willard R. Smith and Carrie M. Brown Smith. Her father was an amateur musician. She started playing the cornet on radio from childhood.

== Career ==
In 1929, still a teenager, Smith played first trumpet in the Boston Women's Symphony, with Ethel Leginska conducting. In 1942, she won the Ossip Gabrilowitsch Scholarship Fund Award from the National Orchestra Association.

She was a soloist in the Radio City Music Hall Orchestra from 1943 to 1945, and was the first woman trumpeter in the Metropolitan Opera stage band, where she was engaged from 1960 to 1961. She also played with Fred Waring. She was featured as a soloist in the forty-member Seuffert Band, a longtime institution in Queens. She also led her own ensemble, the Leona May Smith Dance Band, and composed works, including "Mignon Fantasy" (performed in 1961). "She has been hailed by critics as being not only the greatest woman cornettist," reported one newspaper in 1940, "but has been unquestionably conceded to be one of the greatest soloists of this generation."

Smith and her husband founded and co-directed a summer music program, Ethan Allen Music Camp (later known as Music For Youth), in Craftsbury, Vermont, from 1949 to 1957. In 1961 she gave a presentation to a conference of school music teachers in Brooklyn. After 1973, she lived in Plymouth, Massachusetts, where she ran a home for elderly women. In 1993, Smith and two trombonists (Betty Glover and Melba Liston) were honored as Brasswomen Pioneers at the first International Women's Brass Conference, held in St. Louis.

== Personal life ==
Leona May Smith married music teacher and band director George F. Seuffert in 1933. They had four sons, George, Edward, Peter, and Frank. They later divorced. She died in 1999.
