= Hollis Dann =

American music educator and choral director (1861–1939)

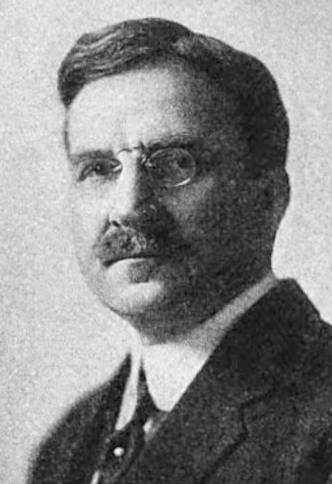
- Born: May 1, 1861; Canton, Pennsylvania
- Died: January 3, 1939 (aged 77); Douglaston, New York
- Occupation(s): Music educator and choral director

Hollis Ellsworth Dann (May 1, 1861 – January 3, 1939) was an American music educator and choral director during the early twentieth century.

== Early life ==
Dann was born in Canton, Pennsylvania to a musical family and studied music in Boston before returning to his hometown to teach music lessons and lead a church choir and community chorus. In 1886, he became principal of the academy at Havana, New York (now Montour Falls).

== Career in Ithaca ==
In 1887, Dann was hired to teach penmanship in the public schools in Ithaca, New York with the promise that he could also begin instruction in music. Music education was rarely included in the school curriculum in this era. Dann founded and directed a high school chorus and men's chorus, while also directing the local Presbyterian Church Choir. After the founding of the Ithaca Conservatory of Music in 1892, Dann served on the school's executive committee. He remained the supervisor of music in Ithaca schools until 1905.

In 1889, Dann became director of the Cornell University Glee Club, a position he would hold for 32 years. He significantly raised the musicality of the ensemble, beginning a tradition of tours and bringing the choir to England in 1895, one of the first international tours by an American choral ensemble. On this tour, the men were hosted by the Savage Club of London, and a similar organization was founded in Ithaca upon their return.

After judging a local band competition in 1894, Dann helped persuade bandleader Patrick Conway to relocate to Ithaca to form the Ithaca Band, teach at the Ithaca Conservatory, and lead the Cornell Cadet Band (now the Cornell Big Red Marching Band).

Dann was hired by Cornell University in 1903 as instructor of music to begin a department of music at the university. He was promoted to assistant professor in 1904 and full professor in 1907. In addition to leading choral activities and overseeing music at Sage Chapel, Dann organized annual music festivals between 1904 and 1920, bringing nationally famous soloists and orchestras to Ithaca to perform major works. He also began the Cornell concert series to regularly bring noted musicians to campus.

From 1910 to 1921, Dann organized a summer school at Cornell for teachers and supervisors of music, training hundreds of music teachers. Besides teaching music education and technique, the program also included music appreciation and community music, and it was one of the first institutions to offer training in instrumental supervision.

== State and national music leadership ==
Dann was very active as a leader in music education on the state and national levels. He chaired the music council of New York state from 1910 to 1921, and also was chair of music examinations for the New York State Board of Regents and a member of the New York State Music Syllabus Committee, which standardized music teaching. He held a leadership role in the Music Supervisors National Conference (now the National Association for Music Education) from 1910 until his death in 1929, including serving as president from 1919 to 1920. He conducted the first national high school chorus in 1928.

In 1921, Dann left Ithaca to become state music director in Pennsylvania, providing oversight for music education at all ages and levels of education. He developed a statewide curriculum and was a strong proponent of community singing.

== Other work ==
In 1918, Dann took a leave of absence from Cornell to serve as the Army Song Leader in Louisville, Kentucky. He edited and compiled the first Army Song Book.

He is perhaps best known as the author and editor of numerous songbooks and music teacher manuals. He authored the eight-volume Hollis Dann Music Course and five-volume Hollis Dann Song Series. He also edited a popular school hymnal and a songbook of Christmas carols, possibly the first to publish the music and lyrics together for "It Came Upon a Midnight Clear".

== Later career ==
At the age of 63, Dann joined the faculty of New York University in 1925, remaining until retirement in 1936. He founded the Department of Music Education and oversaw the first graduate work there in the subject. He continued to teach workshops and guest conduct festival choirs and state choirs around the country until shortly before his death. He died at his home in Douglaston, New York on January 3, 1939.
