= Footguard Hall =

- Governor’s Foot Guard Armory
- U.S. National Register of Historic Places
- (2026)

- Location within Connecticut Location within the United States
- Location: Foot Guard Place and High Streets, Hartford, Connecticut
- Coordinates: 41°46′14″N 72°40′47″W
- Area: less than one acre
- Built: 1888
- Architect: Mead, John C.
- Architectural style: Romanesque
- MPS: Hartford Downtown MRA
- NRHP reference No.: 84000771
- Added to NRHP: December 23, 1984

The Governor’s Foot Guard Armory is the headquarters and armory of the First Company Governor's Footguard of the state Connecticut, a ceremonial military company founded in 1771 and originally tasked with protecting the governor and state legislature on election days. The armory is located at 159 High Street, in Hartford, Connecticut, in a Romanesque Revival brick building built in 1888. The building was listed on the National Register of Historic Places in 1984 in recognition of the organization's history and its distinctive architecture. The Board of Directors of the 1st Co GFG now uses the building for community events, 1st GFG Band rehearsals, and housing for the Museum of Military Histofy.

==Description and history: The Governor’s Foot Guard Armory is located at the northwestern corner of downtown Hartford, at the corner of High Street and Foot Guard Place. It is a large red brick building trimmed with brownstone. Its front section is two stories in height and capped by a hip roof, with a pyramidally roofed square tower rising near the center of the front facade. On either side of the tower are window bays with banded sash windows, set in rectangular openings on the ground floor and large rounded arches on the second. The main entrance is at the base of the tower, with a projecting round-arch portico providing shelter. A large assembly and drill hall extends to the rear of the front section.

The First Company Governor's Foot Guard was established in 1771 by the Connecticut Colony and was formed as a ceremonial unit, tasked with escorting the Governor and legislature on election days. Because it was formed as a separate unit, distinct from the Connecticut colonial militia and later the National Guard, it could not be called to national service as a unit. Nevertheless, members of the First Company Governor’s Foot Guard have proudly served in other national military units in most of the nation’s military conflicts.

The armory was designed by the architectural firm of John C. Mead, a prominent local architect then in his last year of life. The design was likely the work of Melvin Hapgood, who was one of Mead's principal lieutenants and took over the firm after Mead died.

The building was described at the time as the largest meeting hall between Boston and New York City, and has been used for public events.

== See also ==
- National Register of Historic Places listings in Hartford, Connecticut
