= Ernest S. Williams (minister) =

Minister associated with the Assemblies of God denomination

Ernest S. Williams (1885-1981) was the 5th General Superintendent of the Assemblies of God from 1929–1949.

== Early life and ministry ==
Ernest Williams was born in San Bernardino, California, his family was active in the Holiness Movement. In 1904, he converted to Christianity, two years later he attended the Azusa Street Revival, making him the only General Superintendent to participate in the revival.

== Theology ==
In his Systematic Theology, Williams periodically responds to Calvinist criticisms of his Arminian-like views.

== Notes and references ==
=== Sources ===
Buschart, W. David (2006). Exploring Protestant Traditions: An Invitation to Theological Hospitality. Downer Grove, IL: Intervarsity Press.
