= Del Staigers =

American cornetist and composer (1899–1950)

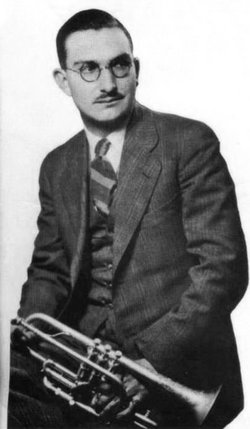

Background information
- Born: Charles Delaware Staigers; August 20, 1899; Muncie, Indiana, United States
- Died: July 12, 1950 (aged 50); Los Angeles, California
- Genres: Concert band
- Occupation: Musician
- Instruments: Trumpet, Cornet
- Years active: 1914-1950
- Labels: RCA Victor Records, Capitol Records
- Formerly of: Goldman Band

Charles Delaware Staigers was an American cornetist. He was born on August 20, 1899, in Muncie, Indiana. In 1914, he was hired to play in Patrick Conway's band. In 1918, he joined John Philip Sousa's band as the assistant to cornet soloist Frank Simon. He stayed with John Philip Sousa through 1920. He played "Taps" at John Philip Sousa's funeral. After leaving Sousa, he became first trumpeter at The Hippodrome and later at The Strand Theatre in New York City. In 1926, he joined the Goldman Band. His first appearance with The Goldman Band in Central Park before a crowd of over 25,000 people drew vociferous applause and bravos. He played with The Goldman Band through 1934, and also for the 1942 season.

He died on July 12, 1950, at age 50. In the words of Edwin Franko Goldman, Staigers was the "greatest cornetist in the world".

== Discography ==
Solo recordings

- The Carnival Of Venice (1929) [Victor 21191-A]
- Napoli-Bellstedt (1929) [Victor 21191-B]
- My Heaven Of Love (1929) [Victor 22429-A]
  - (Recorded October 25, 1929, at Liederkranz Hall, New York City.)
- Mi Cielo De Amor (1930) [Victor 22429-A]
- (Released In Italy)
- Princess Alice-Bellstedt (1929-1930) [Unknown]

With Nat Shilkret and The Victor Salon Group

- Oh, Promise Me (1929) [Victor 22051-B]

ARTCO recordings

- Official Bugle Calls (1939) [ARTCO 2897]
- Ten Trumpet/Cornet Instruction Lessons (1939) [ARTCO]

Children's recordings

- Rusty In Orchestraville (1946) [Capitol BC 35]
- (Featured playing excerpt from "Carnival Of Venice" on Side 3)

== Published works ==
- Hazel (Dedicated To My Wife) (1929) Carl Fischer
  - Solo or Duet for various wind instruments
- The Carnival Of Venice (1936) Carl Fischer
  - Solo for trumpet or cornet with band or piano accompaniment
- The Three Stars (1940) Carl Fischer
  - Trumpet trio with piano
- Flexibility Studies and Technical Drills - Part 1 [0 3564] (1950) Carl Fischer
- Flexibility Studies and Technical Drills - Part 2 [0 3648] (1950) Carl Fischer

== Unpublished works ==
- International Fantasie (1928)
  - Cornet Solo with Band Accompaniment
- Fantasie Caprice (1932)
  - Cornet Solo with Band Accompaniment
- Capitol City (March) (1934)
  - March for Concert Band
