= Edwin J. McEnelly =

American jazz violinist and band director (1879–1958)

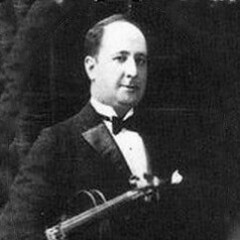
- Born: July 21, 1879; Spencer, Massachusetts, U.S.
- Died: August 31, 1958 (aged 79); Southborough, Massachusetts, U.S.
- Resting place: Milford, Massachusetts, U.S.
- Occupations: Jazz violinist, band director

Edwin J. McEnelly (July 21, 1879 – August 31, 1958) was an American jazz violinist and band director.

== Biography ==
Edward James McEnelly formed a dance band in 1902 known as the "Edwin J. McEnelly Singing Orchestra". By 1917, Edwin and his Singing Orchestra had a regular gig playing at Riverside Park in Springfield, Massachusetts.

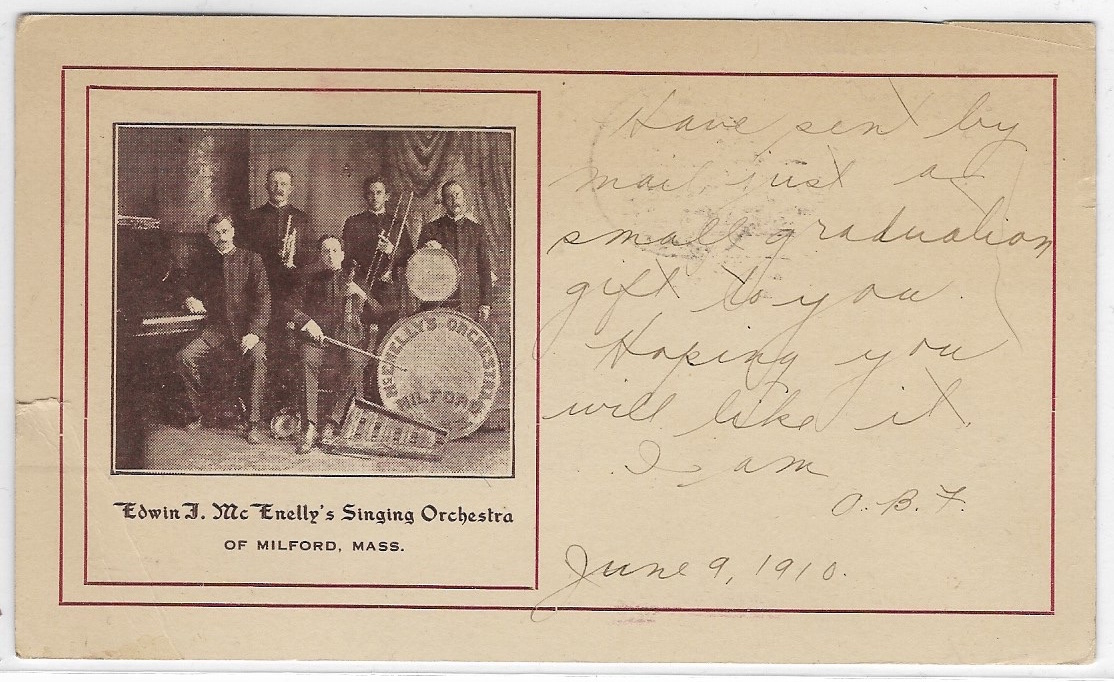
A postcard from June 9, 1910 featuring Edwin J. McEnelly and his Singing Orchestra

After leading this small dance band for many years, he moved to jazz during the Roaring Twenties. Throughout the years of his jazz career, his orchestra grew bigger and bigger adding new members such as Frankie Carle and Waino Kauppi. He made his first recordings with Victor Talking Machine Company in May 1920. However, these 1920 recordings were never released to the public. He made his first records that were released to the public in March 1925.

Edwin J. McEnelly recorded many songs for Victor records until 1929, when the Great Depression forced him and his orchestra to no longer make recordings for Victor records. He continued to lead the band up until 1942. During this time when he couldn't record, he also worked as a violin teacher and a piano tuner. In 1942 he had to end his music career due to health conditions. He died on August 31, 1958, and was buried in Milford, Massachusetts.

== Style ==
McEnelly was most well known as a dance band leader during the 1920s playing jazz music. Some of his recordings feature jazz, waltz and dance music. As his popularity increased, Edwin and his orchestra started to broadcast over WBZ radio. Edwin and his orchestra would also frequently compete in "battle of the bands" with other dance orchestras of the time (It is known that he beat Jean Goldkette and his Orchestra in one instance). During his increase in popularity, he would increase the number of members in his orchestra. By the mid-1920s, he had a fourteen-piece orchestra with members such as Frankie Carle (Joining in 1924) and Waino Kauppi (Joining in 1917). In some of his recordings, the arrangements have very Middle Eastern and Southeast Asian sounding qualities. In his recording of "Moonlight in Mandalay", the arrangement uses instrumentation and rhythms reminiscent of Southeast Asia.

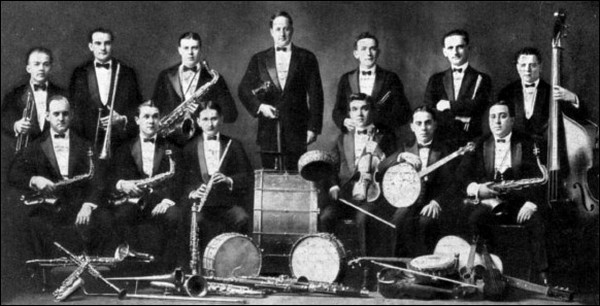
Edwin J. McEnelly's 13-piece orchestra, c. 1922

1925 recording of "What a Blue Eyed Baby you Are" played by Edwin J. McEnelly and his orchestra. (Courtesy to Bryan Wright of Rivermont Records for the transfer of the original disc)

== Recordings ==
His first recordings were on Victor Records with the title "Let the rest of the world go by" (recorded on May 4, 1920). Although this was never released to the public, it is still his first recording with the Victor company. His first record to be released to the public was Victor record No.19617-A with the title "Desert Isle". This record was a big hit. After that, his second recording to be released to the public was on the new "Victor Electric" records, with the title: "Spanish Shawl" (recorded on November 2, 1925). This caused Edwin and his Orchestra to become very popular. He began to broadcast for WBZ radio and performed regularly with them. He kept recording with Victor Records until 1929 when the Great Depression caused his orchestra to no longer record. However, he kept leading the orchestra for many more years until he retired in 1942.

== Notable alumni ==
- Frankie Carle
- Waino Kauppi

== Discography ==
- Edwin J. McEnelly's Orchestra: Complete Recordings (1925–1929) (Rivermont Records, 2004)
