= Nahan Franko =

American violinist and conductor (1861–1930)

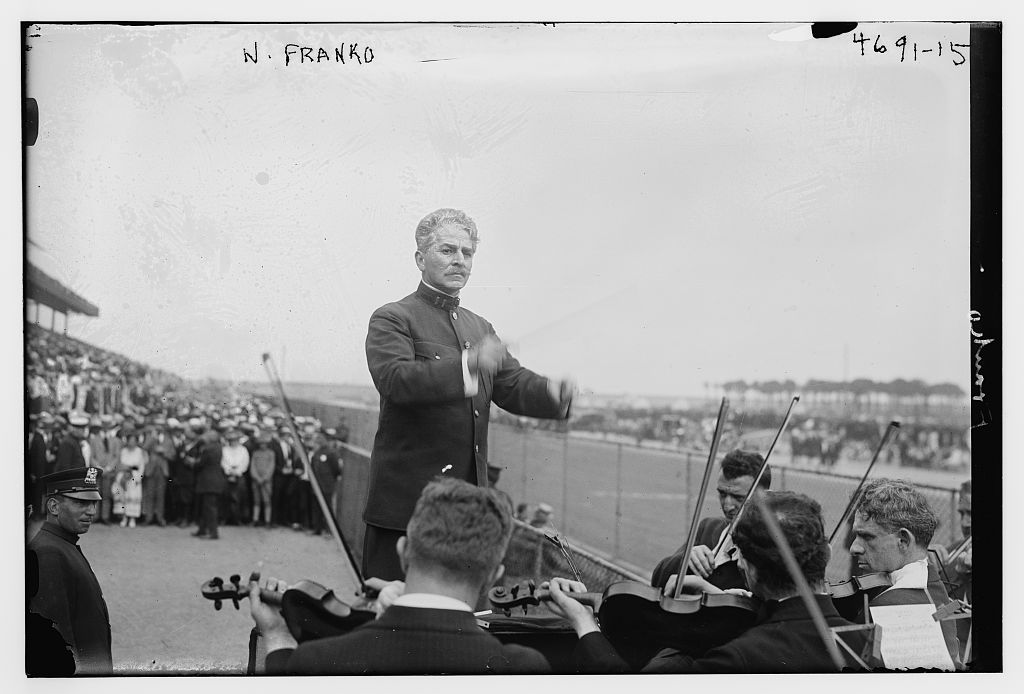
- Born: 23 July 1861; New Orleans, Louisiana, United States
- Died: 7 June 1930 (aged 68); Amityville, New York, United States
- Spouse(s): Edith Edwards Cornelia Anna Ruppert (m. 1895; died 1896) Anna Braga (m. 1899)
- Relatives: Sam Franko (brother)

Nahan Franko (July 23, 1861 - June 7, 1930) was an American violinist, conductor and concert promoter. His brother was violinist and conductor Sam Franko.

== Biography ==
Franko was born in New Orleans on July 23, 1861. He studied the violin in Europe with Joseph Joachim and August Wilhelmj. He also studied under Simon E. Jacobsohn at the College of Music of Cincinnati. He became an orchestral violinist, playing with leading American and European orchestras; he later became the first American-born conductor to work at the Metropolitan Opera in New York City.

Nahan Franko made his debut in 1869 at Steinway Hall, and subsequently toured with Adelina Patti as a child prodigy. After studying with Joachim and Wilhelmj in Berlin, he returned home and played with various orchestras, becoming concertmaster of the Metropolitan Opera Orchestra in 1883, a position he retained until 1907 while leading occasional Met concerts as of 1898. On November 4, 1901, he made his debut as conductor with the company, leading Lohengrin on tour in St. Louis—the first native-born American to conduct an opera with the company. Other works Franko conducted were Roméo, Faust, Zigeunerbaron, Die Fledermaus, Hansel und Gretel, Il Trovatore, Don Giovanni, and two ballets, Coppélia and Bayer's Puppenfee, as well as numerous Sunday-evening concerts. He conducted 68 performances at the Met, and 33 performances with the company elsewhere. Additionally, he conducted approximately 67 opera performances and 9 dance works. The remaining were Metropolitan concerts. As third conductor and concertmaster in 1904-05, he was paid $4,045. Beginning in 1908, he led open-air concerts in Central Park, and it was largely through his efforts to make good music popular by performing these al fresco concerts did NYC and the Metropolitan Opera begin the habit of performing free outdoor performances. Franko celebrated his golden jubilee with a concert at the Hippodrome. Nahan continued public and private performances with his orchestra for nearly two decades.

Married three times, Franko's first wife was Edith Edwards whom he wed and divorced at a young age. On 7.3.1895 he married Cornelia Anna Ruppert (b. 6.21.1865) and became her widower on 12.3.1896. Cornelia Anna Ruppert-Franko was the sister of Jacob Ruppert. Franko's widow was German actress Anna Braga whom he married in 1899.

At 68, Nahan Franko died of a blood clot at his Amityville, New York home where he was recuperating from an earlier stroke. His pallbearers included Theodore Steinway and John Philip Sousa.
