= Ernest Williams (conductor) =

American band conductor and musician

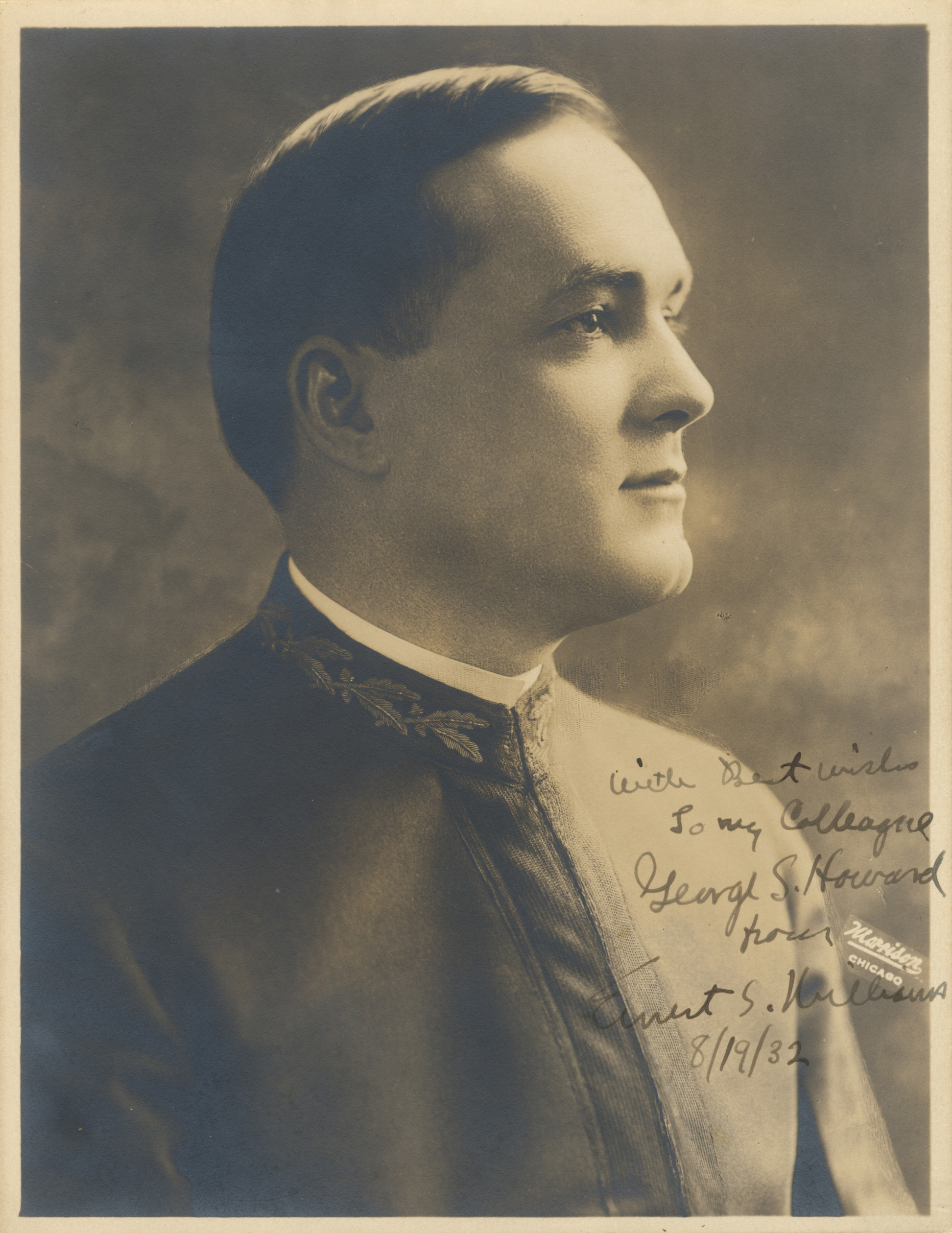
Ernest Williams, 1932. Inscription reads, "With best wishes to my colleague George S. Howard from Ernest S. Williams, 8/19/32"

Ernest S. Williams (27 September 1881 – 8 February 1947) was a prominent American band conductor, cornet soloist, composer, and music educator.

== Education ==
Ernest S. Williams' first teacher was his father. He then moved to Boston where he studied cornet with Henry C. Brown and Gustav Strube. In 1910, Williams moved to New York where he studied with Herbert L. Clarke.

== Performance career ==
A native of Wayne County, Indiana, Ernest Williams' musical career began in 1898 as a volunteer in the 158th Regiment of the Indiana Volunteer Infantry when he served as cornet soloist during the Spanish–American War. His talents as a performer were highly regarded and, after successfully substituting as bandmaster in his regiment, Williams was chosen to lead the 161st Indiana Regiment, beginning his rise through the ranks of the Army bands.

Between 1907 and 1912, Williams conducted the Cadet Band (the representative band of the city of Boston) as well as his own band at Lakeside Park, Colorado. In the ten years following this period, Williams traveled the world as a cornet soloist, performing with such well-known bandleaders as Nahan Franko, Victor Herbert, Patrick Conway, John Philip Sousa and Edwin Franko Goldman. Williams was Goldman's first cornet soloist, beginning with the New York Military Band in 1917 and later the Goldman Band from 1918 to 1922. He joined the Philadelphia Orchestra in 1917, performing as solo trumpeter under Leopold Stokowski, Richard Strauss, Georges Enesco, Vincent d'Indy and Ossip Gabrilowitsch.

== Ernest Williams School of Music ==
In 1922, Williams’ interest in music education led him to form the Ernest Williams School of Music in Brooklyn, New York. The premise of the institution was to offer students comprehensive training in the field of music on a variety of instruments, provide experience with the theoretical and practical aspects of music, and work in ensemble settings that emphasized equally band and orchestra repertoire. In 1930, the school extended its activities, adding an eight-week summer session, held annually in the Catskill Mountains in Saugerties, New York. The school gained a reputation for producing skilled musicians who became successful professional musicians. A number of noteworthy composers lectured, taught, conducted, and/or had their works premiered at the Ernest Williams School, including Percy Grainger, Erik W. G. Leidzén, Ferde Grofé, Henry Cowell, and Morton Gould. From 1929 to 1931, Williams divided his time between the Brooklyn school and as the new Dean of the Ithaca Conservatory Conway Band School, being the chosen successor of Patrick Conway.

While fulfilling administrative duties at his respective institutions, Williams continued to conduct and also composed. He earned high praise for his conducting prowess with the Kismet Temple Band in Brooklyn and also, beginning in 1935, as the conductor of the New York University Symphonic Band. As a composer, Williams became the first American to write a full symphony for band when he penned the Symphony in C Minor in 1937. Recent investigations have revealed that Erik Leidzén possibly ghost-wrote many of Ernest S. Williams' pieces from scratch, even the Symphony in C Minor. Also of note are his opera, Rip Van Winkle, and tone poem, America (for chorus and band or orchestra), which stand alongside numerous marches, concerti and solos.

== Honors ==
In 1931, Ernest S. Williams was elected to the American Bandmasters Association and, in 1983, he was posthumously installed in the National Band Association Hall of Fame of Distinguished Band Conductors.
