= Edwin Franko Goldman =

American composer & conductor (1878–1956)

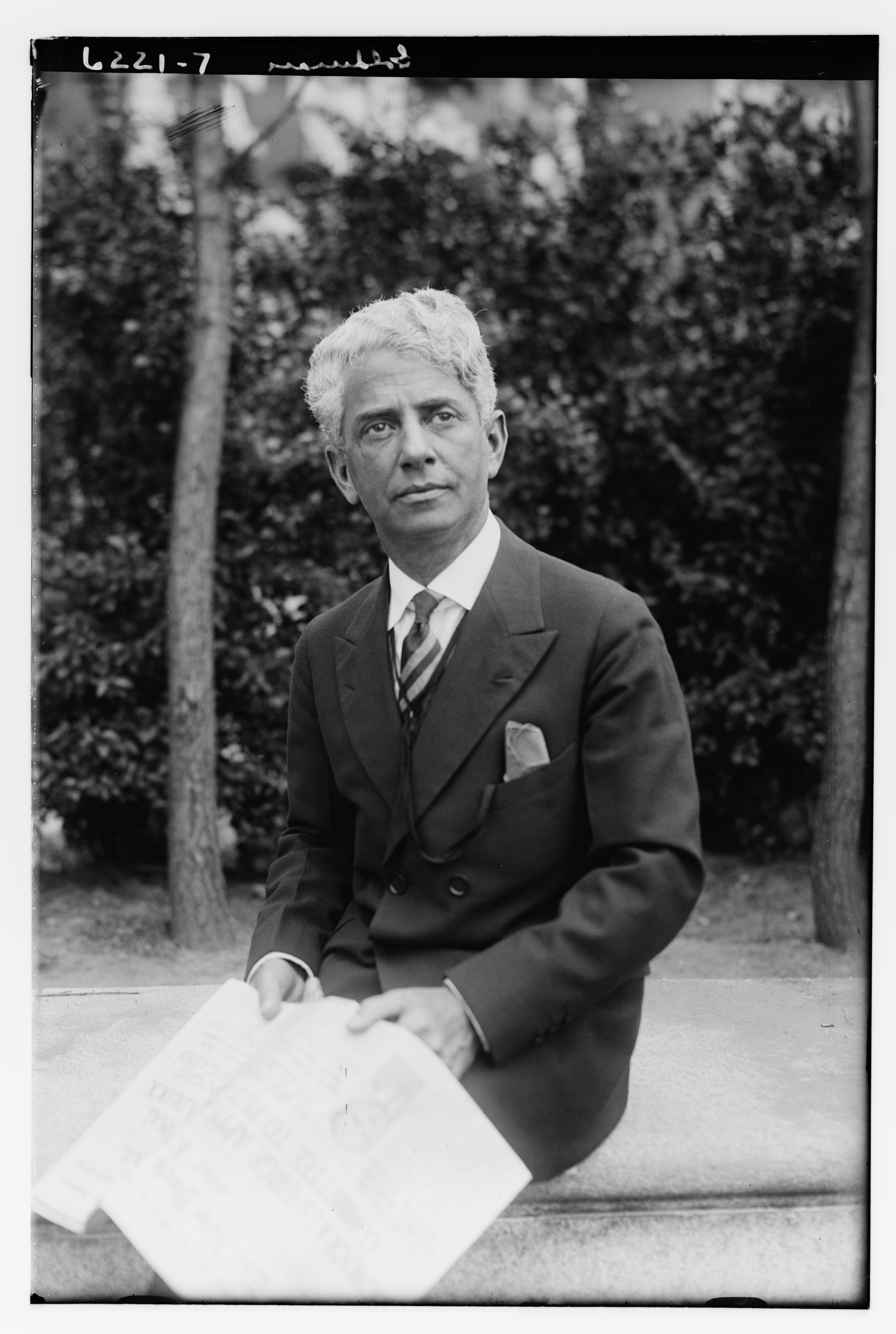
- Edwin Franko Goldman
- Born: January 1, 1878; Louisville, Kentucky, U.S.
- Died: February 21, 1956 (aged 78); Montefiore Einstein Medical Center, The Bronx, New York City, U.S.
- Occupations: Musician, composer & conductor
- Spouse: Adelaide Maibrunn (m. 1908)
- Parents: David Henry Goldman (father); Selma Franko Goldman (mother)
- Relatives: Nahan Franko (uncle)

Edwin Franko Goldman (January 1, 1878 – February 21, 1956) was an American composer and conductor. One of the most significant American band composers of the early 20th century, Goldman composed over 150 works, but is best known for his marches. He founded the renowned Goldman Band of New York City and the American Bandmasters Association. Goldman's works are characterized by their pleasant and catchy tunes, as well as their fine trios and solos. He also encouraged audiences to whistle/hum along to his marches. He wrote singing and whistling into the score of "On the Mall" (which vies with "Chimes of Liberty" as his two most-enduring marches).

== Early life and education ==
Goldman was born January 1, 1878, in Louisville, Kentucky, the son of David Henry and Selma Franko Goldman. The family moved to Evansville, Indiana in 1879 and, finally, to Terre Haute, Indiana. His father died in Terre Haute on December 18, 1886, when Goldman was only eight years old, and the following year, Selma and her four children, Edwin, Mayer, Irma and Alfred, moved to New York City. Before her marriage, Goldman's mother was a professional pianist and part of the Franko Family, which made its debut at Steinway Hall in New York on September 17, 1869.

At the age of nine, Goldman studied cornet with George Wiegand at the Hebrew Orphan Asylum in New York City. In 1892, after winning a scholarship, he attended the National Conservatory of Music, where he studied music theory and played trumpet in the Conservatory orchestra. He also studied under master cornetist Jules Levy.

== Career ==
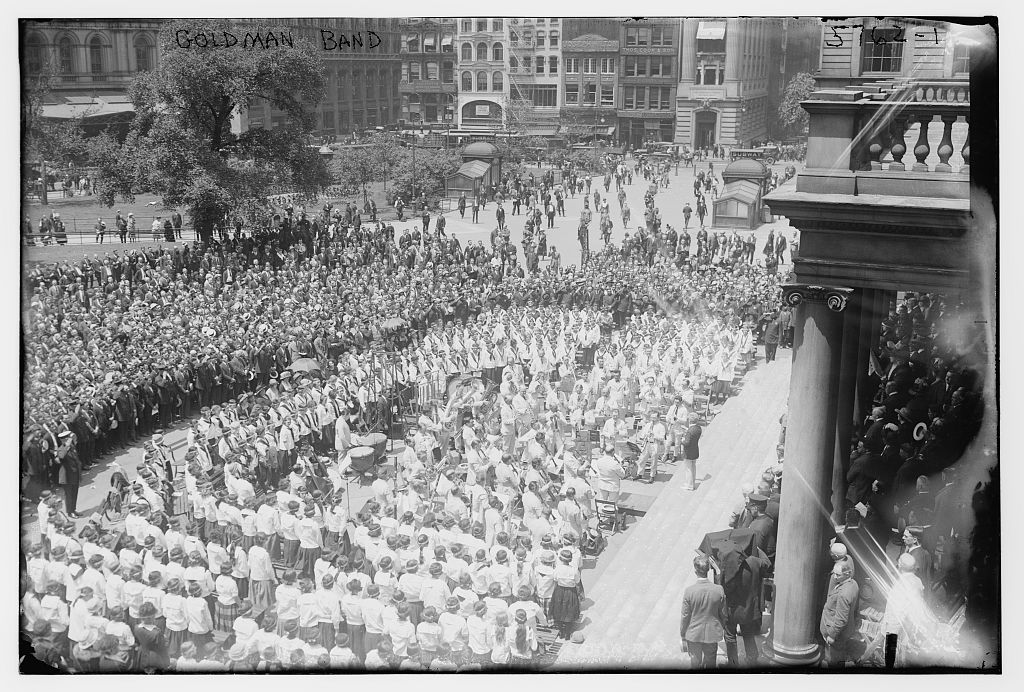
The Goldman Band at a performance in 1922

In 1893, he became a professional trumpet player, performing in such organizations as the Metropolitan Opera House orchestra alongside his uncle Nahan Franko, the orchestra's concertmaster and assistant conductor. He married Adelaide Maibrunn (1885–1975) in 1908. The next year, he left the Metropolitan Opera orchestra and went to work for the publishing house Carl Fischer Music, where he remained for ten years.

Goldman founded the New York Military Band in 1911, later known as the Goldman Band. The band played in many summer band concerts throughout New York, especially The Green at Columbia University and then in the Naumburg Orchestral Concerts, at the Naumburg Bandshell, Central Park. In the 1930s the band performed three nights a week at the bandstand in Brooklyn's Prospect Park. They were also heard on many radio broadcasts. A feature every concert was the encore, almost always Ravel's "Boléro" or Goldman's own march composition "On the Mall" accompanied by the audience singing the theme. From 1920 to 1926, Goldman moonlighted as the first professional "coach" of the bands at Columbia University, directing both the Columbia University Marching Band and the university's symphonic band.

During their nearly 50 years of their marriage, Adelaide wrote lyrics for several of Goldman's more popular pieces, including "On the Mall".

Goldman was known for his very congenial personality and dedication to music. He was very close to city officials and earned three honorary doctorates. Eventually in 1929, he founded the American Bandmasters Association and served as Second Honorary Life President after John Philip Sousa.

== Death ==
Goldman died at Montefiore Hospital in New York on February 21, 1956, and his son Richard Franko Goldman succeeded him as conductor of the Goldman Band. For his contribution to the radio industry, Goldman has a star on the Hollywood Walk of Fame at 6410 Hollywood Boulevard. The Goldman Band Shell in Allentown, Pennsylvania's West Park is also named in his honor. For over 100 years, the band shell has been the home to the Allentown Band, of which Goldman was the first guest conductor in 1927.

== Goldman's works ==
In his lifetime, Goldman composed over 150 works, including:

- 1922 Chimes of Liberty (revised by Goldman in 1937)
- 1923 On the Mall
- 1931 Boy Scouts of America
- 1931 Onward-Upward
- 1934 The Children's March
- 1934 The Interlochen Bowl
- 1936 Bugles and Drums
- 1937 Jubilee March
- 1943 The Bugler (For Leonard B. Smith)
- 1949 Introduction and Tarentella (For James F. Burke)
- 1953 March Illinois
- A Bit of Syncopation, character piece
- Cheerio
- Espanita for cornet solo and brass band
- Jupiter for cornet solo and brass band
- Kentucky
- On the Green, waltz intermezzo
- On the Hudson
- Scherzo Cornet/Euphonium Solo
- Springtime Fancies, waltz
- Star of the Evening, waltz-intermezzo
- Sunshine and Shadows, waltz
- "Pioneer March"
- "Bluejackets on Parade"

He was also the composer of many cornet solos and other short works for piano and orchestra.
