= Wallflower (person) =

Introverted personality type

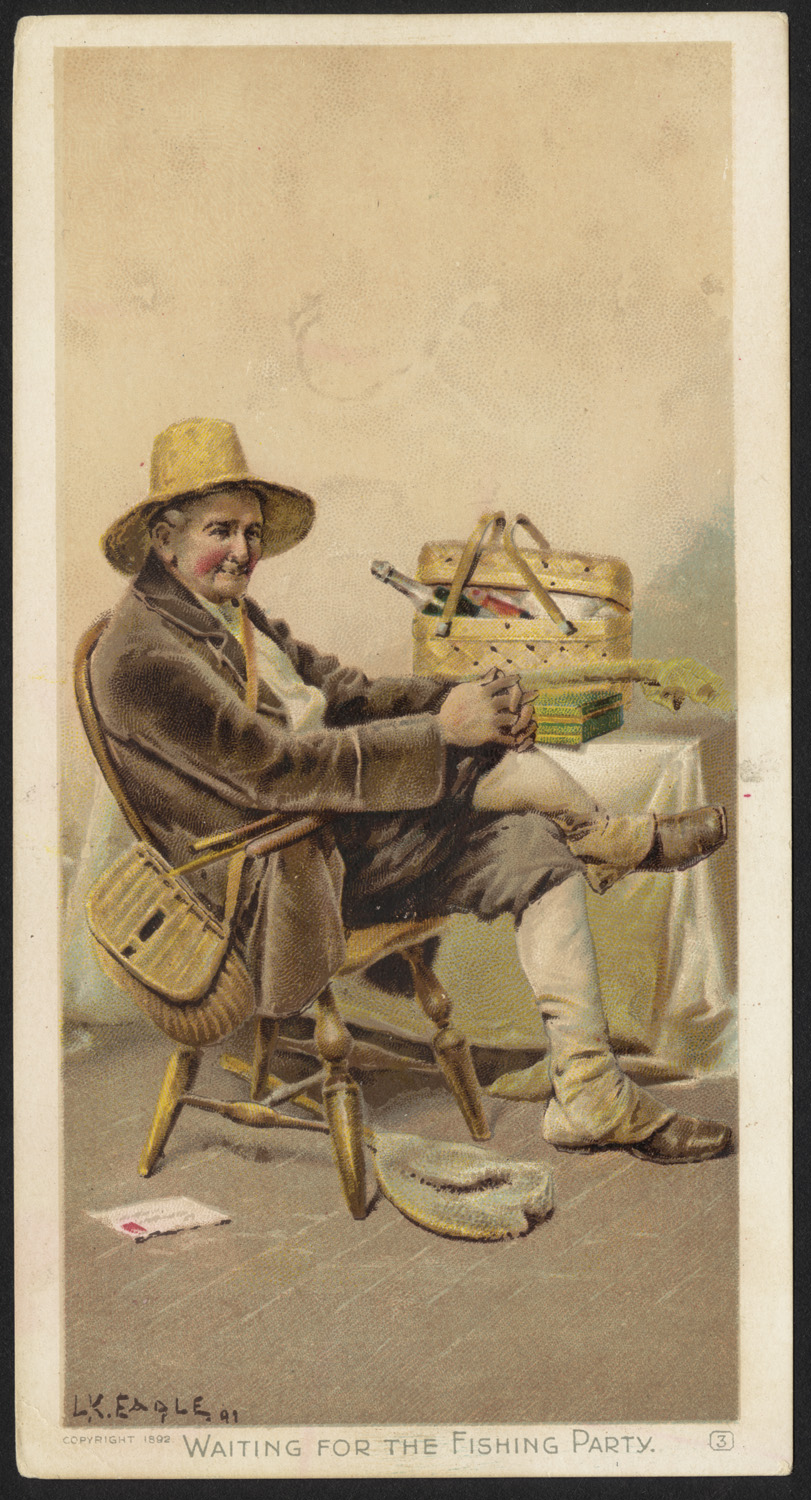
"Waiting for the Fishing Party" chromolithograph

A wallflower is someone with an introverted or shy personality type (or in more extreme cases, social anxiety) who will attend parties and social gatherings, but will usually distance themselves from the crowd and actively avoid being in the limelight. They are also social around friends but not strangers, though once around friends, the strangers become less impactful. The name itself derives from the eponymous plant's unusual growth pattern against a wall as a stake or in cracks and gaps in stone walls. "Wallflowers" might literally stand against a wall and simply observe others at a social gathering, rather than mingle.

== In popular culture ==
- In the novel The Perks of Being a Wallflower by Stephen Chbosky, as well as in the film adaptation of the same title, the main character Charlie often finds himself alone in school or at parties. He also has anxiety and depression.
- In the song "Here" by Alessia Cara, the artist describes wanting to enjoy herself at home and not attend any parties with her friends.
- Bob Dylan sings about a wallflower in the song "Wallflower" from 1971.
- Jakob Dylan, son of Bob Dylan, founded the popular band the Wallflowers in 1989.
- In the song "Wallflower" by In Flames, from the album Battles, they describe life from the perspective of a wallflower.
- In the My Little Pony spin-off Equestria Girls, the 2018 special "Forgotten Friendship" features the character Wallflower Blush who is an extreme introvert, says her only friends are the plants in her garden and who sings the song "Invisible" about nobody ever taking notice of her existence.
- In the song "Wallflower" from the album Wallflowers by Ukrainian metal band Jinjer, the vocalist describes herself being a wallflower.
- In the song "Stall Me (Bonus Track)" from the deluxe version of the album Vices & Virtues by rock band Panic! at the Disco, the lyrics mention a 'wallflower garden', meaning a group of people who are collectively distancing themselves from the rest of the party.
- The lyrics of the song "Wallflower" by K-pop girl group Twice are about seducing a wallflower.
- In the composition "Suite of Old American Dances" by Robbert Russel Bennet for Wind Ensemble there is a unit entitled "Wallflower Waltz". This movement utilizes the aesthetic characteristics of a Waltz in order to convey the composer's feelings on the identity of Wallflowers.

== See also ==
- Eccentricity (behavior)
- Hermit
- Loner
- Recluse
