= Catfish Row =

Orchestral work by George Gershwin

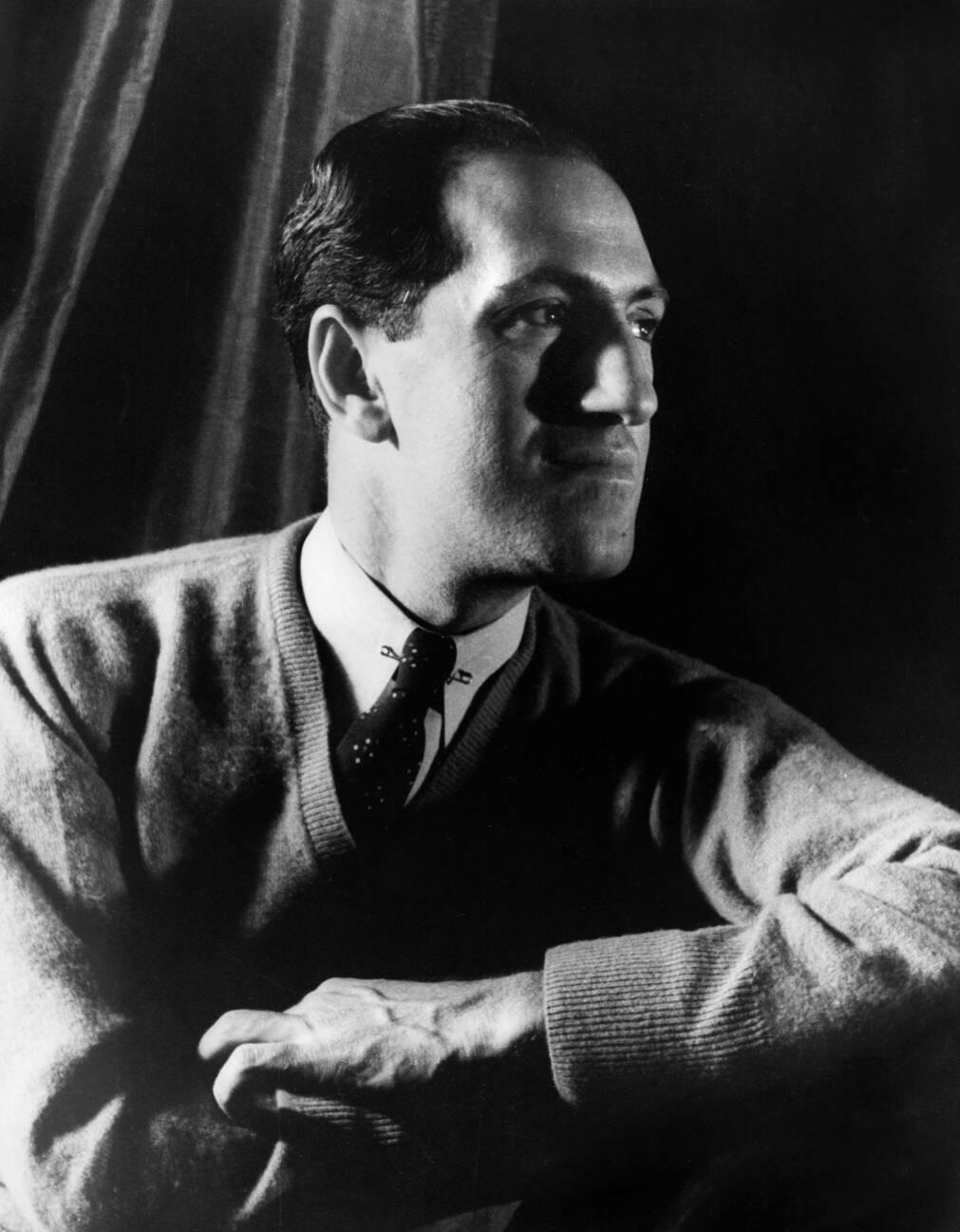
George Gershwin in 1937

Catfish Row, originally titled Suite from Porgy and Bess, is an orchestral work by George Gershwin based upon music from his famous opera Porgy and Bess. Gershwin completed the work in 1936 and it premiered at the Academy of Music in Philadelphia on January 21 of that year, with Alexander Smallens conducting the Philadelphia Orchestra. Gershwin played the piano part, including the piano solo in the opening moments. This piece preserves some of the darkest and most complex music Gershwin ever wrote.

It should not be confused with Porgy and Bess: A Symphonic Picture, scored at the behest of Fritz Reiner by Robert Russell Bennett in 1942, five years after George Gershwin’s death, and premiered by the Pittsburgh Symphony Orchestra in 1943.

== Movements ==
1. Catfish Row contains the Introduction, "Jazzbo Brown's Piano Blues", which was cut from the opera until 1976 (a motive from this music is first heard in the orchestral Introduction, which was actually composed later), and the first iteration of "Summertime" with a short coda. The coda consists of the opening bars of the "crap game" music, which immediately follows "Summertime" in the opera.
2. Porgy Sings contains one of Porgy's arias: "I Got Plenty o' Nuttin" and Porgy and Bess's duet "Bess, You Is My Woman Now" bridged by a cello solo (the introduction to the latter song).
3. Fugue contains the dark dissonant music from the murder of Crown in Act III scene 1.
4. Hurricane features the music from the hurricane sequence (12 more measures than the R. R. Bennett Porgy and Bess "Symphonic Picture" medley).
5. Good Morning, Sistuh contains the Act III Prelude from the final scene of the opera, as well as the final song, "Oh, Lawd, I'm on My Way".

== Instrumentation ==
Catfish Row is scored for two flutes (the second doubling piccolo), two oboes (the second doubling English horn), four clarinets in B-Flat (the fourth doubling bass clarinet in B-flat), one bassoon, three French horns in F, three trumpets in B-flat, two trombones, one tuba; a percussion section that includes timpani, drum set, xylophone, cymbals, snare drum, bass drum, tubular bells, tom-tom, wood block, suspended cymbal, glockenspiel and triangle; one piano; one banjo and strings.

== History ==
Gershwin conducted all of the ensuing performances before his death in 1937, and many scholars have pronounced it unperformed and virtually forgotten until its March 1958 rediscovery by Ira Gershwin's secretary, Lawrence D. Stewart. It did, however, receive a 14 April 1942 performance by Pierre Monteux and the San Francisco Symphony. Another performance was scheduled and publicized by the Minneapolis Symphony for the very next day (15 April 1942), but couldn't be given because there was then only one set of performance materials (score & parts) for the work (Ferencz, 2011). In 1958, Ira Gershwin decided to re-title the work "Catfish Row" to distinguish it from Robert Russell Bennett's medley, though its first (1959) recording, by the Utah Symphony, nonetheless used the original title.

== Preservation status ==
On September 22, 2013, it was announced that a musicological critical edition of the full orchestral score will be eventually released. The Gershwin family, working in conjunction with the Library of Congress and the University of Michigan, are working to make scores available to the public that represent Gershwin's true intent. The entire Gershwin project may take 30 to 40 years to complete.

Some recordings (such as a January 1990 recording by the Chicago Symphony Orchestra and a December 2014 performance by the New York Philharmonic) include extra incidental music from the opera in the third and fifth movements, it is unknown if the critical edition score will include this material.
