= Words of wisdom =

Words of wisdom may refer to:

- The word of wisdom, a spiritual gift listed in 1 Corinthians 12:8
- The Word of Wisdom (Latter Day Saints), the health code of the Latter Day Saint movement
- "Words of Wisdom", a song by Jinjer from the album King of Everything
- "Words of Wisdom", a song by Christopher Cross from the album Another Page
- "A Word of Wisdom", a song by M83 from the album DSVII
