= Alive in Melbourne =

Live album by Jinjer
- Released: 20 November 2020
- Recorded: 5 March 2020
- Venue: Max Watt's House of Music, Melbourne, Australia
- Genre: Djent; groove metal; metalcore
- Label: Napalm Records

Jinjer chronology
| Macro (2019) | Alive in Melbourne (2020) | Wallflowers (2021) |

Alive in Melbourne is the debut live album by Ukrainian metal band Jinjer. It was released on 20 November 2020 on Napalm Records.

== Background ==
Alive in Melbourne was recorded on 5 March 2020, during the band's performance at Max Watt's House of Music in Melbourne, which was held as part of the Macro World Tour. This concert was one of the last before the start of the COVID-19 pandemic. On 9 July 2020, the recording of the concert was broadcast on the website of the online media and festival Knotfest.

Alive in Melbourne was released on 20 November 2020. Simultaneously with the release of the album, the band posted a full video recording of the concert on the label's YouTube channel.

According to the band's bassist, Eugene Abdukhanov, initially the musicians planned to release several songs recorded at the concert, but after six months of post-production, the decision was made to release a full-fledged live album. Abdukhanov himself wrote the lyrics about the concert and the album for the album booklet.

== Critical reception ==
Professional ratings
Review scores
| Source | Rating |
|---|---|
| Metal Hammer | 4/5 stars |

Overall, Alive in Melbourne received positive reviews. Critics emphasize the high quality of the recording and the artistry and performing skills of vocalist Tatiana Shmaylyuk.

== Track listing ==
| No. | Title | Length |
|---|---|---|
| 1. | "Intro" | 4:00 |
| 2. | "Teacher, Teacher!" | 5:57 |
| 3. | "Sit Stay Roll Over" | 4:38 |
| 4. | "Ape" | 3:28 |
| 5. | "Judgement (& Punishment)" | 4:36 |
| 6. | "I Speak Astronomy" | 5:55 |
| 7. | "Who is Gonna Be the One" | 5:42 |
| 8. | "Noah" | 4:32 |
| 9. | "Retrospection" | 4:30 |
| 10. | "Perennial" | 4:39 |
| 11. | "On the Top" | 5:43 |
| 12. | "Pit of Consciousness" | 4:34 |
| 13. | "Home Back" | 4:26 |
| 14. | "Words of Wisdom" | 4:59 |
| 15. | "Pisces" | 5:09 |
| 16. | "Captain Clock" | 4:44 |
| 17. | "Outro" | 1:37 |
| Total length: | | 79:09 |

== Personnel ==
Adapted from Discogs and the Alive in Melbourne liner notes:

=== Jinjer ===
- Tatiana Shmayluk – vocals
- Roman Ibramkhalilov – guitar
- Eugene Abdukhanov – bass guitar
- Vladislav Ulasevich – drums

=== Other participants ===
- Max Morton – mastering
- Dmitry Kim — mixing
- Oleksandr Antoshyn — recording
- Gabriel Nicoletti — album cover
- Oleg Ruz — art director
