= Wallflowers (album) =

Studio album by Jinjer
- Released: 27 August 2021
- Recorded: 2020–2021
- Studios: Morton; Kaksa Records
- Genres: Progressive metal; groove metal; metalcore; djent
- Length: 47:22
- Label: Napalm
- Producers: Max Morton; Jinjer

Jinjer chronology
Alive in Melbourne (2020)	Wallflowers (2021)	Live in Los Angeles (2024)

Jinjer studio album chronology
Macro (2019)	Wallflowers (2021)	Duél (2025)

Singles from Wallflowers
- 1. "Vortex" Released: 17 June 2021; 2. "Mediator" Released: 28 July 2021; 3. "Wallflower" Released: 25 August 2021; 4. "Disclosure!" Released: 15 November 2021; 5. "Call Me a Symbol" Released: 8 June 2022

Professional ratings
Review scores
Source	Rating
Blabbermouth.net	8.5/10
Kerrang!	4/5
The Music	4.5/5 stars
Sputnikmusic	4.0/5

Wallflowers is the fourth studio album by Ukrainian metalcore band Jinjer, released on 27 August 2021 by Napalm Records. The album's name refers to the term "wallflower" for someone with an introverted or shy personality type.

== Background ==
Vocalist Tatiana Shmayluk stated in an interview that the album was initially titled As I Boil Ice after one of the songs - this was rejected due to a perceived mismatch between the title and the album artwork. After another song "Introvert" was renamed to the more abstract "Wallflower", the album was given its final title.

== Promotion and release ==
The album was announced by the band, along with its release date of 27 August, with the release of the music video for "Vortex" on 17 June 2021.

"Mediator" was released as the second single on 28 July 2021. The title refers to Shmayluk's result on a personality test recommended by her friend. The third single, "Wallflower", was released on 25 August. Following the release of the album, two further singles were released: "Disclosure!" on 15 November 2021 and "Call Me a Symbol" on 8 June 2022.

== Track listing ==
Wallflowers track listing
No.	Title	Length
1.	"Call Me a Symbol"	4:21
2.	"Colossus"	3:37
3.	"Vortex"	4:02
4.	"Disclosure!"	3:47
5.	"Copycat"	4:23
6.	"Pearls and Swine"	5:20
7.	"Sleep of the Righteous"	4:32
8.	"Wallflower"	4:18
9.	"Dead Hands Feel No Pain"	4:09
10.	"As I Boil Ice"	4:22
11.	"Mediator"	4:30
Total length:		47:22

== Personnel ==
=== Jinjer ===
- Tatiana Shmayluk – vocals
- Roman Ibramkhalilov – guitar
- Eugene Abdukhanov – bass guitar
- Vladislav Ulasevich – drums

=== Other participants ===
- Max Morton – production, recording, mixing, mastering
- Dmitry Kim – assistant recording engineer
- Philipp Schuster – art direction

== Charts ==
Chart performance for Wallflowers
Chart (2021)	Peak position
Austrian Albums (Ö3 Austria)	22
Belgian Albums (Ultratop Wallonia)	64
Finnish Albums (Suomen virallinen lista)	27
German Albums (Offizielle Top 100)	7
Scottish Albums (Official Charts)	62
Swiss Albums (Schweizer Hitparade)	12
UK Independent Albums (Official Charts)	13
UK Rock & Metal Albums (Official Charts)	5
