= Duél (Jinjer album) =

Studio album by Jinjer
- Released: 7 February 2025
- Genre: Progressive metal; groove metal; metalcore
- Length: 42:50
- Label: Napalm Records
- Producer: Max Morton; Jinjer

Jinjer chronology
Wallflowers (2021)	Duél (2025)

Duél is the fifth studio album by Ukrainian heavy metal band Jinjer, released on 7 February 2025 by Napalm Records.

== Background ==
The album was produced by Max Morton, who had produced several of the band's previous albums. Most of the songs were inspired by the history of Ukraine and Eastern Europe in the late 19th Century, plus singer Tatiana Shmayluk's forced relocation to Los Angeles in light of the Russian invasion of Ukraine. The album is also informed by the band's unanticipated status as cultural ambassadors for their country while touring internationally during hostilities in Ukraine.

== Critical reception ==
The album received generally positive reviews. Metal Injection declared that "Jinjer is operating at the peak of their creative powers" and offered particular praise for Shmayluk's powerful vocals. Kerrang! described the album as an example of the "underdog status" of heavy metal, informed by the comparable underdog status of Jinjer's home country of Ukraine, and concluded that the album "is unsparing in its intensity, with its superb and scorching title track reminding us that when it’s good vs. evil, you can’t be a neutral bystander."

Metal Planet praised the album's "undeniable drive, focus and a sound that is impossible to replicate." Antihero magazine called the album "a relentless symphony of fury, introspection, and masterful groove metal." Sonic Perspectives praised the album's "aggression and impact" which Jinjer has delivered "to its greatest degree yet, resulting in an album that continues to push the envelope even within the already auspicious precedents set in this band’s previous studio work."

Angry Metal Guy issued a less positive review, concluding that the album offers little new from Jinjer's songwriting while the band relies too much on Shmayluk's charisma. The album was named by Loudwire as one of the eleven best progressive metal albums of 2025.

== Track listing ==
No.	Title	Length
1.	"Tantrum"	3:59
2.	"Hedonist"	3:46
3.	"Rogue"	3:12
4.	"Tumbleweed"	3:22
5.	"Green Serpent"	4:10
6.	"Kafka"	4:09
7.	"Dark Bile"	3:40
8.	"Fast Draw"	3:14
9.	"Someone's Daughter"	4:17
10.	"A Tongue So Sly"	4:25
11.	"Duél"	4:48
Total length:		42:50

== Personnel ==
Jinjer

- Tatiana Shmayluk – vocals
- Roman Ibramkhalilov – guitars
- Eugene Abdukhanov – bass
- Vladislav Ulasevich – drums

Production

- Jinjer – production, composition
- Max Morton – production, mixing, mastering
- Dmitry Kim – engineering

Artwork

- Philipp Scektner – artwork, graphic design
