= Isham Majors =

Missouri Pioneer and Santa Fe Trail Trader

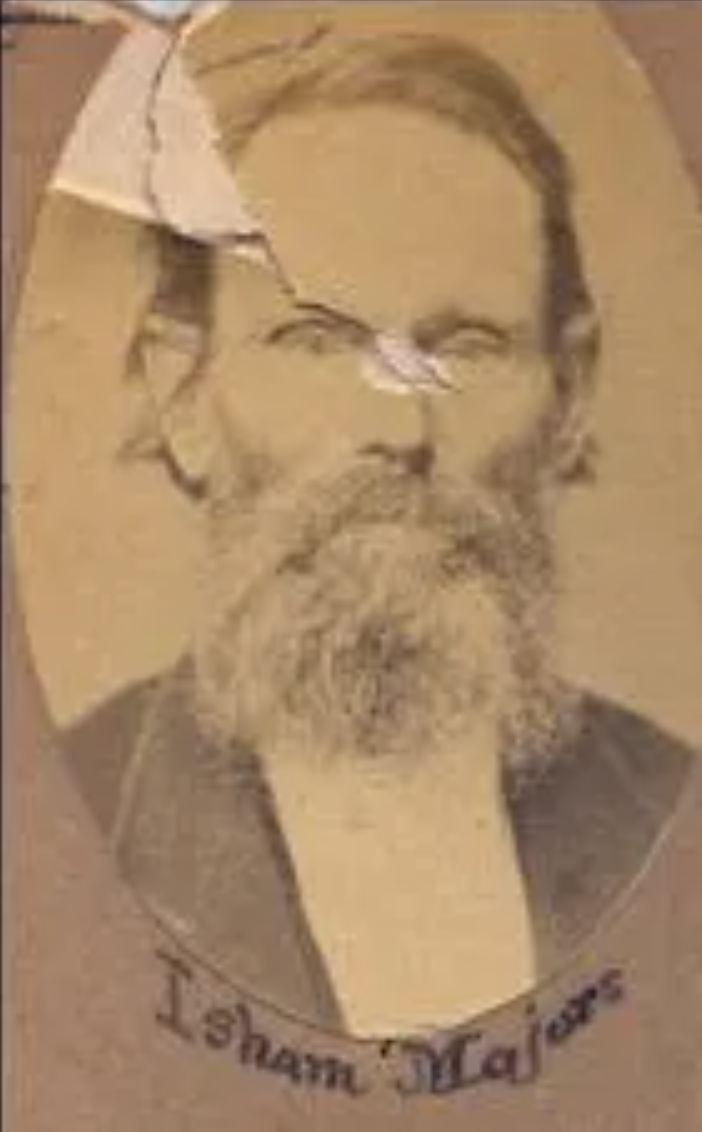
Isham Majors (1807-1905)

Isham Majors (23 July 1807 – 19 Jul 1905) was an American pioneer and Santa Fe Trail bullwhacker. After working for his relative Alexander Majors on the Santa Fe Trail, Isham based his own freighting business in Cass County, Missouri and became a founding resident of Morristown, MO, what is now Freeman, MO.

== Early life and education ==
Isham was born on 23 July 1807 in Hawkins County, Tennessee. His parents were Rebecca and Thomas Majors.

== Missouri Pioneer and Santa Fe Trader ==
=== Arrival to Cass County ===
It is likely that Isham came to Cass County, MO with his wife and several children sometime in 1838, since his last child to be born in Kentucky (Elizabeth F.) was born in 1837 and his first child to be born in Cass County (James A.) was born in March 1839. According to the History of Cass County Missouri by Allen Glenn (1917), Isham came to this area from Tennessee with his brother David in 1840. Either way, that would make his family among the first Anglo-American settlers in the area. At that time, Cass county (then called Van Buren County) was a sparsely inhabited semi-prairie region.

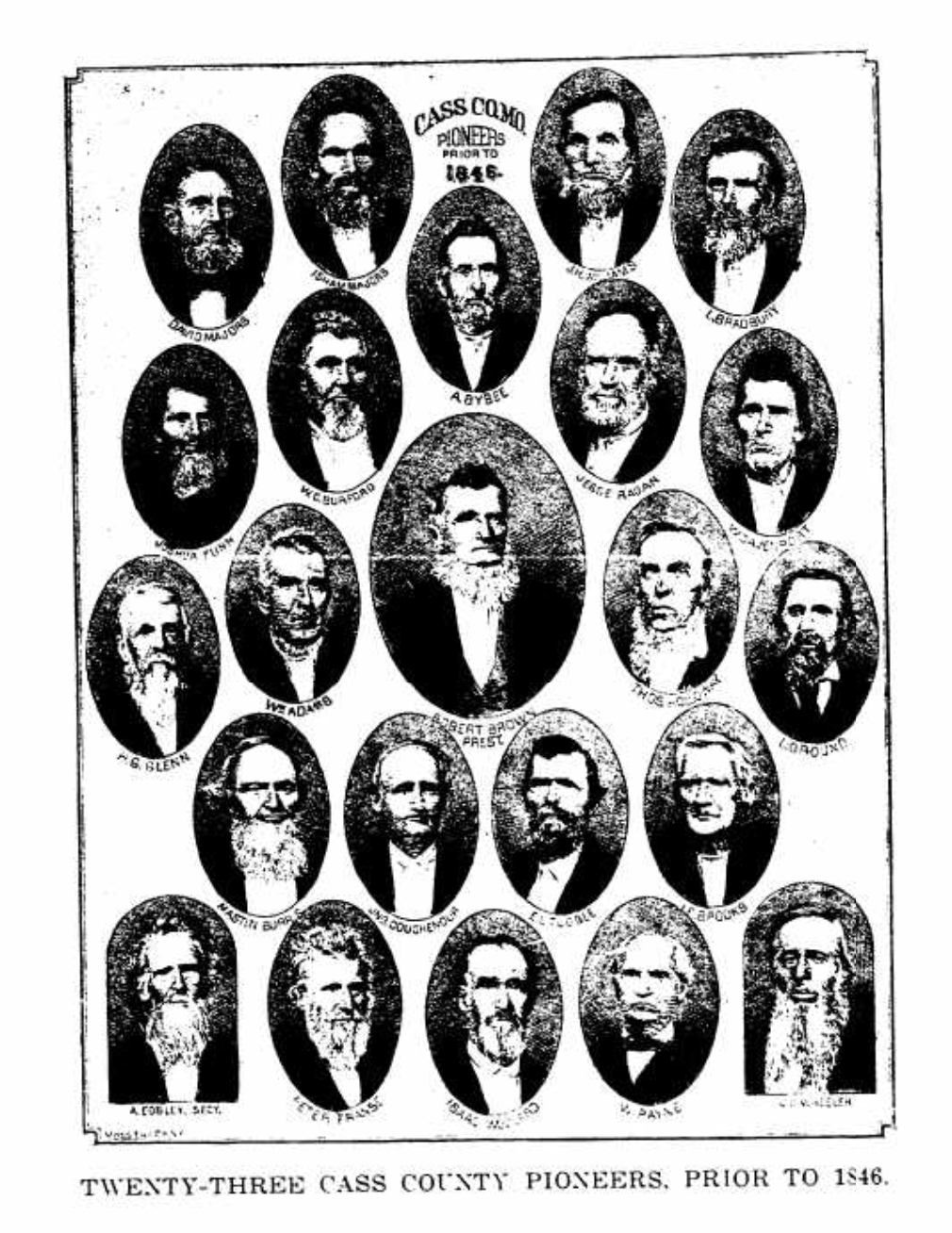
Isham Majors and his brother David are featured (top left) among the "Twenty-Three Cass County Pioneers prior to 1846" in Allen Glenn's 1917 History of Cass County Missouri

In the History of Cass County Missouri, by Allen Glenn, Isham Majors is described as a respectable and hard working member of the pioneer community.

"David and Isham Majors, brothers, who attended the 1879 meeting, came to this county (then Van Buern) in 1840. They came from Tennessee and settled on farms on the middle fork of the Grand River. On these places they resided all their lives. They raised families, some of which are yet useful citizens of the county. They were Presbyterians in faith and old-line Democrats in politics. They were honorable, unobtrusive men and reliable, useful citizens. Their influences were always for the uplift of their country and betterment of humanity. Useful pioneers, and held to that quiet action of life conducive to the best welfare of all."

In 1870, Isham Majors was included in the "Old Settlers Society" which was organized in Cass County, MO with eligibility extending to "all residents over 21 years of age, who came into the county prior to 1846".

==== Santa Fe Trail Trader ====
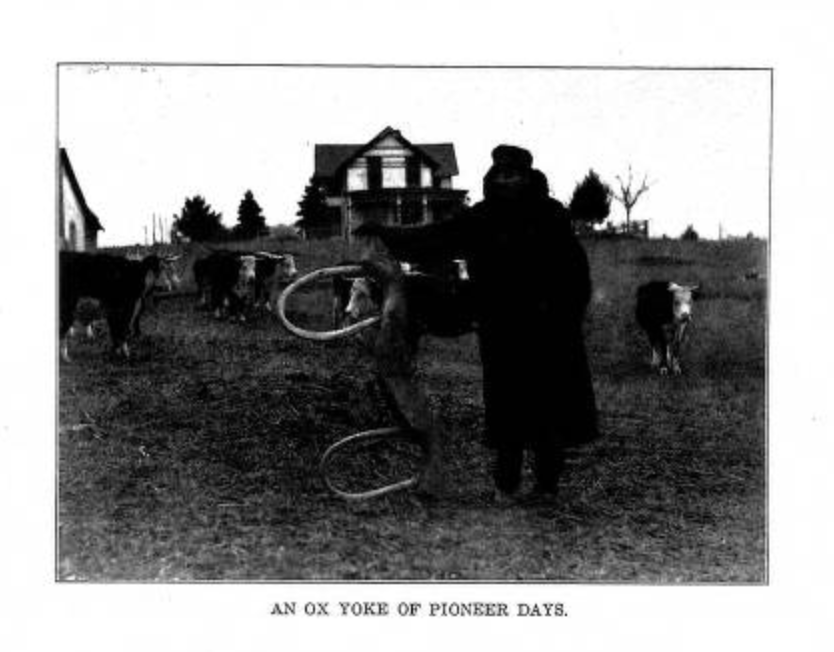
an ox yoke of pioneer date

Isham was a prosperous trader on the Santa Fe Trail, and settled along the old road that connected Harrisonville with Morristown and led west toward the Santa Fe Trail.

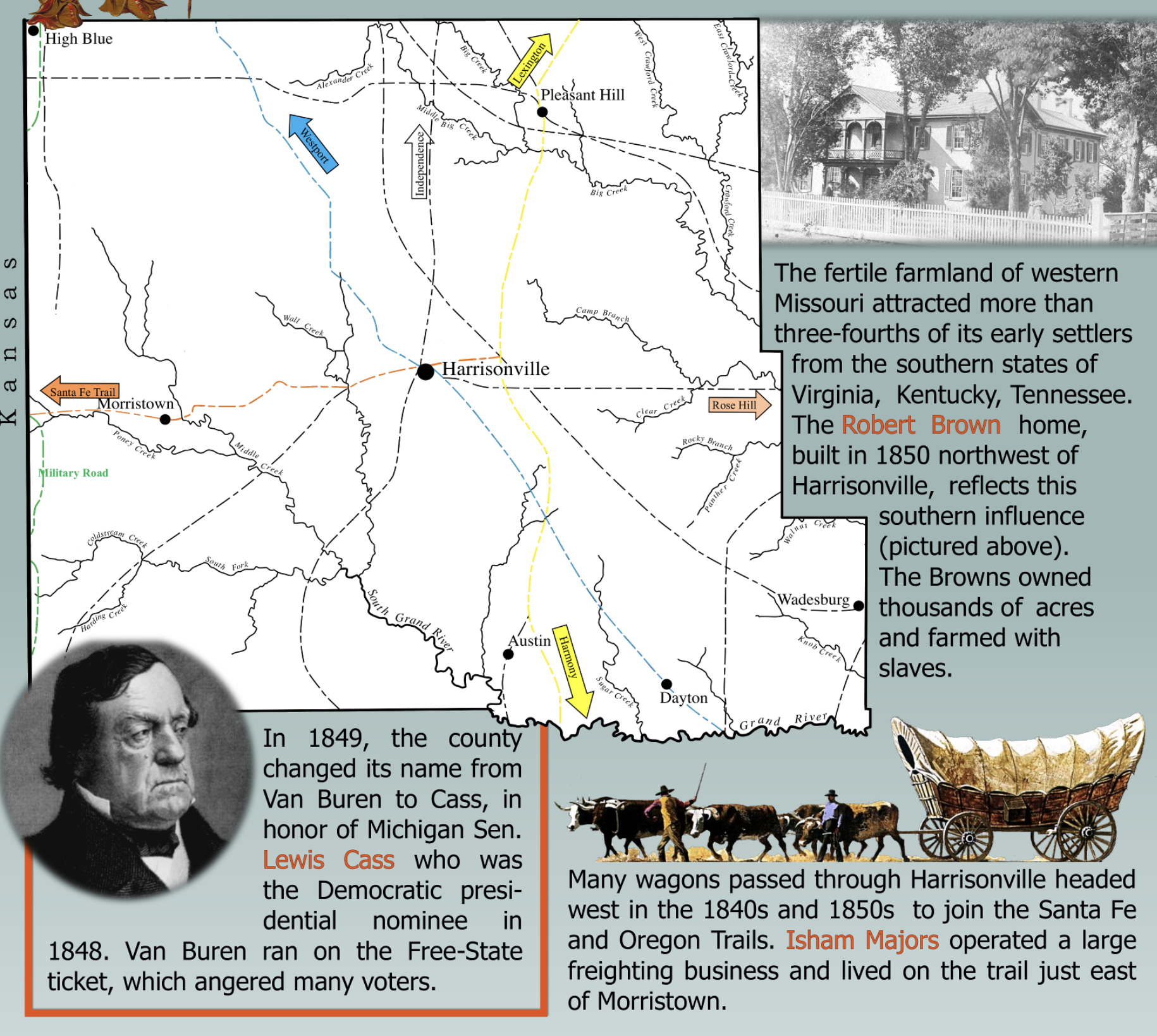
Isham Majors in Cass County

He kept meticulous records of his freighting business and when his home was ransacked by Union forces in 1861-1862, he was able to utilize that record to file a claim with the federal government for reimbursement after the Civil War.

"Their 520 acre farm included an extensive orchard, a large aviary, large beef cattle herd, and six milk cows near the house which sat on a hill. His herds of horses, mules, and oxen supported the farm and freighting business.

Troops from the Kansas 7th Cavalry at nearby Camp Johnson in Morristown began to take livestock and forage to support themselves the winter of 1861 – 1862. On Christmas Day 1861, they took 16 mules; four days later, they took another 30 mules, 26 horses, 40 beef cattle, and 180 tons of hay. They also took a bed, clothing, 150 bushels of apples, and 250 pounds of honey.

On December 30, they stole 5,000 bushels of corn. Their home was burned, but after the War, the Majors built a substantial brick home which still stands on the site. Majors filed a claim in 1866 for $16,735, the single largest individual claim found to date."

== Historic Home ==
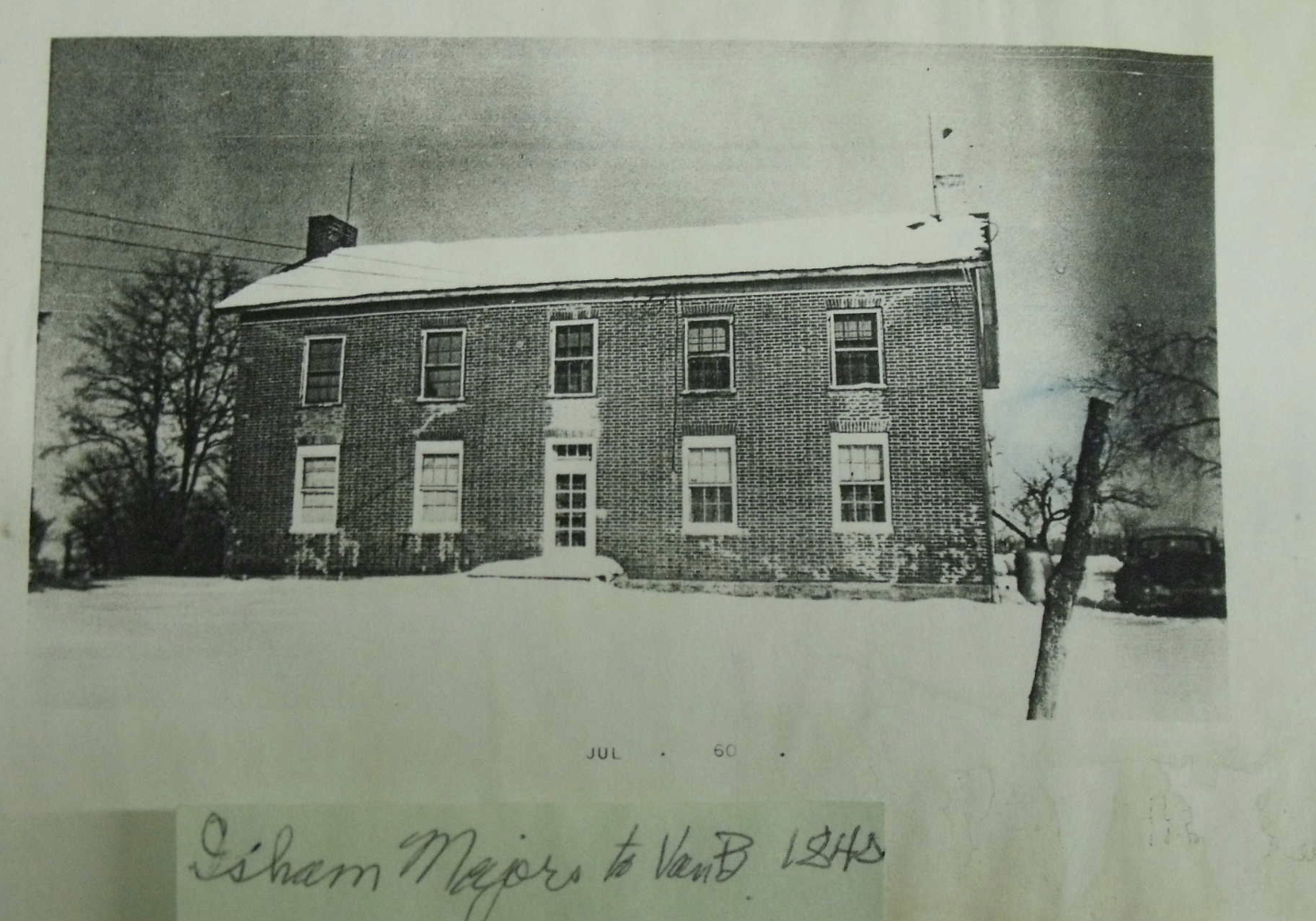
Isham Majors House

The home of Isham Majors was noted as a "fine brick building" in "The History of Cass and Bates Counties" (published in 1883)

The house is still standing off of 267th Street, what was the old road between Morristown and Harrisonville, which lead west to join with the Santa Fe Trail.

As of 2023, the house is not marked or listed on any register of historic places.

Major's Creek in Cass County, MO was named in honor of the first settlement which Isham and David Majors established on its banks in about 1840.

Isham and David are mentioned among the earliest pioneers of Dolan Township in Cass County in the book "The History of Cass and Bates Counties" (published in 1883).
