= Porgy and Bess: A Symphonic Picture =

1942 orchestral medley

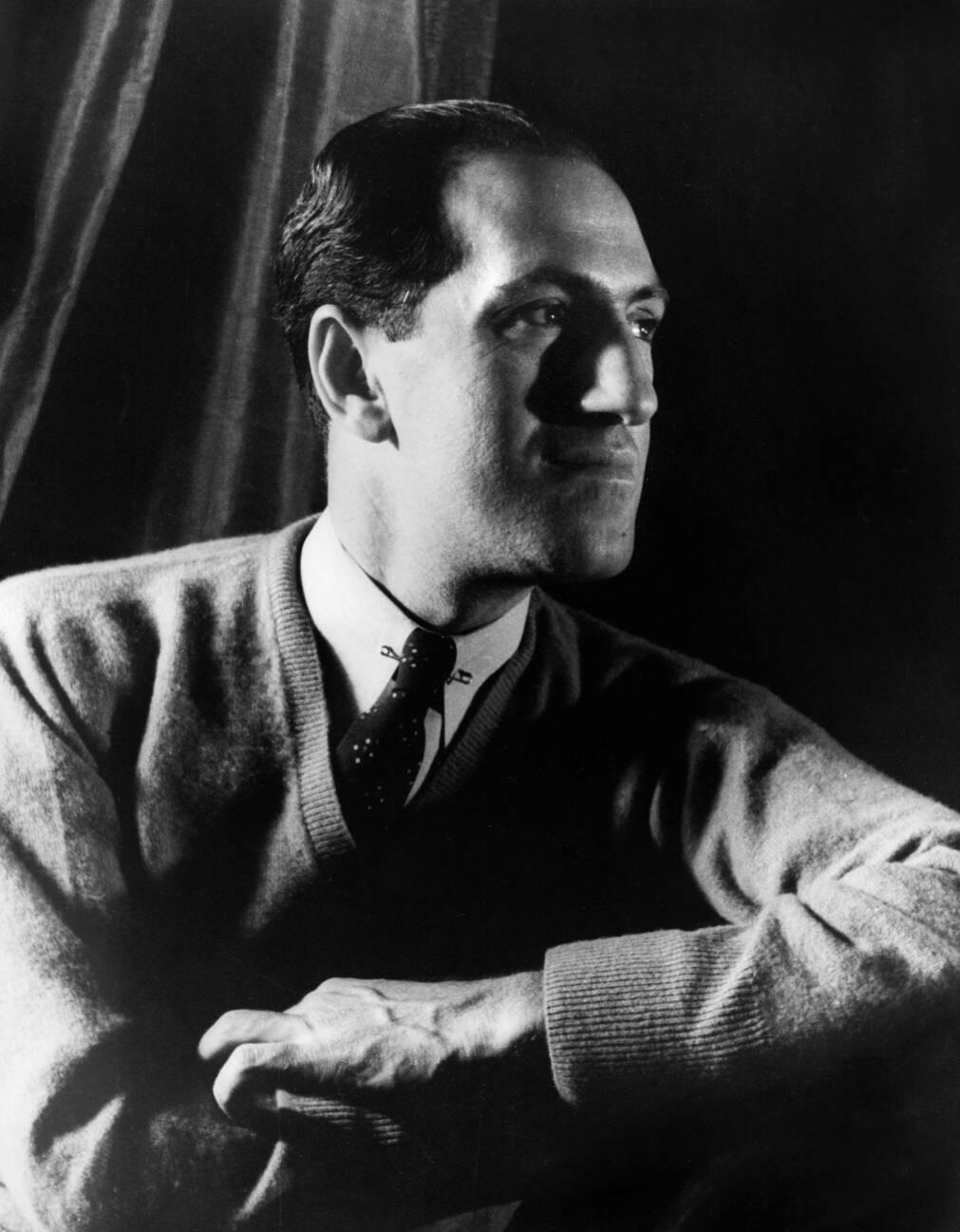
George Gershwin in 1937

Porgy and Bess: A Symphonic Picture is a 1942 orchestral medley arranged by George Gershwin's good friend and sometimes assistant, Robert Russell Bennett, which includes most of the best-known songs from the Gershwin opera Porgy and Bess, although not in the exact order of their appearance. Though the Symphonic Picture is sometimes dismissed as a sequence of the opera's "greatest hits," the first well-known melody, "Summertime," is not heard until nearly seven minutes into the work. While some of the more esoteric parts of the opera are absent, many of the catchier tunes that can be heard in this suite are absent in others, including Gershwin's own Catfish Row Suite, which tended to highlight the more cerebral elements of the work.

== Music ==
The score was prepared at the behest of Fritz Reiner, then conductor of the Pittsburgh Symphony Orchestra and one of Gershwin's most favored conductors (Reiner had hosted Gershwin while leading the Cincinnati Symphony in the 1920s, and gave the second-ever performance of An American in Paris.) Reiner's surviving outline for the work shows that he laid out the order of the excerpts and even keys—a few short sections were transposed, with overall key sequence in mind—almost down to the measure. Reiner aimed for a precisely-24-minute length; it was designed to fit three 78-rpm records (4 minutes per side). Reiner at first considered retaining the solo piano "Jazzbo Brown" sequence. Once he had changed his mind, he did not include Gershwin's piano in his specified instrumentation (in Gershwin's opera, the piano is used primarily to double and reinforce the orchestral texture, rather than in an obbligato role). The actual orchestration in most passages is very closely based on Gershwin's original scoring.

For the 1943 Pittsburgh premiere, Bennett provided this synopsis:

1. Scene in Catfish Row (with peddlers’ calls; Strawberry Woman; Crab Man)
2. Opening Act 3 “Clara, Clara” (Requiem)
3. Opening Act 1 (Introduction)
4. Summertime
5. I Got Plenty O’ Nuttin’
6. Storm Music (Hurricane)
7. Bess, You Is My Woman Now
8. The Picnic Party (Oh, I Can't Sit Down)
9. There's a Boat Dat's Leavin’ Soon for New York
10. It Ain’t Necessarily So
11. Finale (Oh, Lawd, I'm On My Way)

*italicized words are the titles in Gershwin's original score

Bennett arranged Porgy and Bess: A Symphonic Picture for piccolo, 2 flutes, 2 oboes, English horn, 2 clarinets in B♭, bass clarinet in B♭, 2 alto saxophones in E♭, tenor saxophone in B♭, 2 bassoons; 4 horns in F, 3 trumpets in B♭, 3 trombones (2 tenor, 1 bass), tuba; a percussion section that includes timpani, xylophone, triangle, steel bells, cymbals, tubular bells, glockenspiel, snare drum, bass drum and wood block; banjo, 2 harps and strings.
