= Freeman, Missouri =

- City
- Location of Freeman, Missouri
- Coordinates: 38°37′17″N 94°30′21″W
- Country: United States
- State: Missouri
- County: Cass

Area
  - Total: 0.88 sq mi (2.28 km^{2})
  - Land: 0.86 sq mi (2.22 km^{2})
  - Water: 0.019 sq mi (0.05 km^{2})
- Elevation: 915 ft (279 m)

Population (2020)
  - Total: 475
  - Density: 553.2/sq mi (213.59/km^{2})
- Time zone: UTC-6 (Central (CST))
  - Summer (DST): UTC-5 (CDT)
- ZIP code: 64746
- Area codes: 816, 975
- FIPS code: 29-25894
- GNIS feature ID: 2394820
- Website: www.freemanmo.org

Freeman is a city in Cass County, Missouri, United States. The population was 475 at the 2020 census. It is part of the Kansas City metropolitan area.

== History ==
The town of Freeman is located on land once belonging to the Osage Nation that was ceded under duress in the Osage Treaty (1825). In 1845, J.C. Morris relocated from Pennsylvania to Cass County, Missouri and founded the town of Morristown. It was located approximately a mile and half northwest of the present town of Freeman. Though Morristown survived several fires and the Civil War, it could not survive being bypassed by the railroad.

Freeman was platted in 1871 by D.K. Hall and Noah M. Givan, and named after a railroad official. It was the Missouri-Kansas-Texas Railroad also known as the Katy or KT Railroad that ran through Freeman until the line was shut down. The opening of the Stanolind Oil Station in 1916, brought life back to the town. Started by Henry Sinclair, it was later sold to the Standard Oil Company's Service Pipe Line Company. The pipeline went through several name changes due to the breakup of the large oil companies under the Sherman Antitrust Act and is currently owned and operated by BP.

In 1969, the Freeman train depot was torn down to make way for Missouri Route 2 which connected Harrisonville to West Line, Missouri. A short cut for many semi-trucks from US Highway 69 via Louisburg, Kansas, Route 2 has become a main thoroughfare bisecting Cass County. With increased connectivity to larger cities in the county and easy access to US Route 71 / Interstate 49 connecting it to the Kansas City Metro area, Freeman has become a commuter community.

A post office called Freeman has been in operation since 1871.

== Geography ==
According to the United States Census Bureau, the city has a total area of 0.88 square miles (2.28 km^{2}), of which 0.86 square miles (2.23 km^{2}) is land and 0.02 square miles (0.05 km^{2}) is water.

== Demographics ==
Historical population
Census	Pop.	Note	%±
1880	309		—
1890	279		−9.7%
1900	260		−6.8%
1910	251		−3.5%
1920	299		19.1%
1930	279		−6.7%
1940	302		8.2%
1950	309		2.3%
1960	391		26.5%
1970	417		6.6%
1980	485		16.3%
1990	480		−1.0%
2000	521		8.5%
2010	482		−7.5%
2020	475		−1.5%
U.S. Decennial Census

=== Racial and ethnic composition ===
Freeman city, Missouri – Racial and ethnic composition Note: the US Census treats Hispanic/Latino as an ethnic category. This table excludes Latinos from the racial categories and assigns them to a separate category. Hispanics/Latinos may be of any race.
Race / Ethnicity (NH = Non-Hispanic)	Pop 2000	Pop 2010	Pop 2020	% 2000	% 2010	% 2020
White alone (NH)	506	467	440	97.12%	96.89%	92.63%
Black or African American alone (NH)	1	2	2	0.19%	0.41%	0.42%
Native American or Alaska Native alone (NH)	7	1	6	1.34%	0.21%	1.26%
Asian alone (NH)	0	0	0	0.00%	0.00%	0.00%
Native Hawaiian or Pacific Islander alone (NH)	0	0	0	0.00%	0.00%	0.00%
Other race alone (NH)	0	1	0	0.00%	0.21%	0.00%
Mixed race or Multiracial (NH)	3	7	21	0.58%	1.45%	4.42%
Hispanic or Latino (any race)	4	4	6	0.77%	0.83%	1.26%
Total	521	482	475	100.00%	100.00%	100.00%

=== 2010 census ===
As of the census of 2010, there were 482 people, 178 households, and 125 families living in the city. The population density was 560.5 inhabitants per square mile (216.4/km^{2}). There were 215 housing units at an average density of 250.0 per square mile (96.5/km^{2}). The racial makeup of the city was 97.3% White, 0.4% African American, 0.2% Native American, 0.6% from other races, and 1.5% from two or more races. Hispanic or Latino of any race were 0.8% of the population.

There were 178 households, of which 40.4% had children under the age of 18 living with them, 50.6% were married couples living together, 13.5% had a female householder with no husband present, 6.2% had a male householder with no wife present, and 29.8% were non-families. 24.7% of all households were made up of individuals, and 8.9% had someone living alone who was 65 years of age or older. The average household size was 2.71 and the average family size was 3.18.

The median age in the city was 31.4 years. 29% of residents were under the age of 18; 10.5% were between the ages of 18 and 24; 23.1% were from 25 to 44; 26.2% were from 45 to 64; and 11% were 65 years of age or older. The gender makeup of the city was 51.2% male and 48.8% female.

=== 2000 census ===
As of the census of 2000, there were 521 people, 172 households, and 142 families living in the city. The population density was 1,121.2 inhabitants per square mile (432.9/km^{2}). There were 186 housing units at an average density of 400.3 per square mile (154.6/km^{2}). The racial makeup of the city was 97.70% White, 0.19% African American, 1.34% Native American, 0.19% Pacific Islander, and 0.58% from two or more races. Hispanic or Latino of any race were 0.77% of the population.

There were 172 households, out of which 41.3% had children under the age of 18 living with them, 64.0% were married couples living together, 15.7% had a female householder with no husband present, and 17.4% were non-families. 14.5% of all households were made up of individuals, and 7.0% had someone living alone who was 65 years of age or older. The average household size was 3.01 and the average family size was 3.30.

In the city the population was spread out, with 32.4% under the age of 18, 8.1% from 18 to 24, 32.2% from 25 to 44, 15.7% from 45 to 64, and 11.5% who were 65 years of age or older. The median age was 32 years. For every 100 females, there were 88.8 males. For every 100 females age 18 and over, there were 91.3 males.

The median income for a household in the city was $46,339, and the median income for a family was $48,500. Males had a median income of $33,750 versus $23,750 for females. The per capita income for the city was $17,450. About 5.0% of families and 9.1% of the population were below the poverty line, including 13.9% of those under age 18 and 4.6% of those age 65 or over.

== Education ==
It is in the Midway R-I School District.

Metropolitan Community College has the Midway school district area in its service area, but not its in-district taxation area.

== Notable people ==
Robert Russel Bennet, musician, band leader, score composer

Isham Majors, businessman, early county pioneer
