= Macro (album) =

Studio album by Jinjer
- Released: 25 October 2019
- Studios: Morton; Kaksa Records
- Genres: Progressive metal; groove metal; metalcore
- Length: 41:12
- Label: Napalm
- Producers: Max Morton; Jinjer

Jinjer chronology
Micro (2019)	Macro (2019)	Alive in Melbourne (2020)

Jinjer studio album chronology
King of Everything (2016)	Macro (2019)	Wallflowers (2021)

Singles from Macro
- 1. "Judgement (& Punishment)" Released: 23 August 2019; 2. "On the Top" Released: 11 October 2019

Professional ratings
Review scores
Source	Rating
Exclaim!	9/10
Metal Injection	10/10
Rock Hard	6/10
The Rockpit	8/10

Macro is the third studio album by Ukrainian metalcore band Jinjer, released on 25 October 2019 by Napalm Records.

== Release and promotion ==
The album was announced by the band on 23 August 2019 with the release of its lead single "Judgement (& Punishment)". The following single, "On the Top", was released on 11 October 2019. Macro was released on 25 October 2019 and featured experiments in reggae and progressive rock.

The band toured North America from 7 September to 2 November and Europe from 8 November to 22 December to support the album. Jinjer was forced to cancel several other planned tours, including their first in Latin America, due to the COVID-19 pandemic.

== Critical reception ==
In 2024, Emily Swingle of Metal Hammer named Macro as the second-best Jinjer album. Loudwire named it one of the fifty best metal albums of 2019.

== Track listing ==
Macro track listing
No.	Title	Length
1.	"On the Top"	5:28
2.	"Pit of Consciousness"	4:12
3.	"Judgement (& Punishment)"	4:19
4.	"Retrospection"	4:24
5.	"Pausing Death"	4:45
6.	"Noah"	4:14
7.	"Home Back"	4:20
8.	"The Prophecy"	4:01
9.	"Lainnerep"	5:28
Total length:		41:12
