= Jinjer =

Ukrainian metalcore band

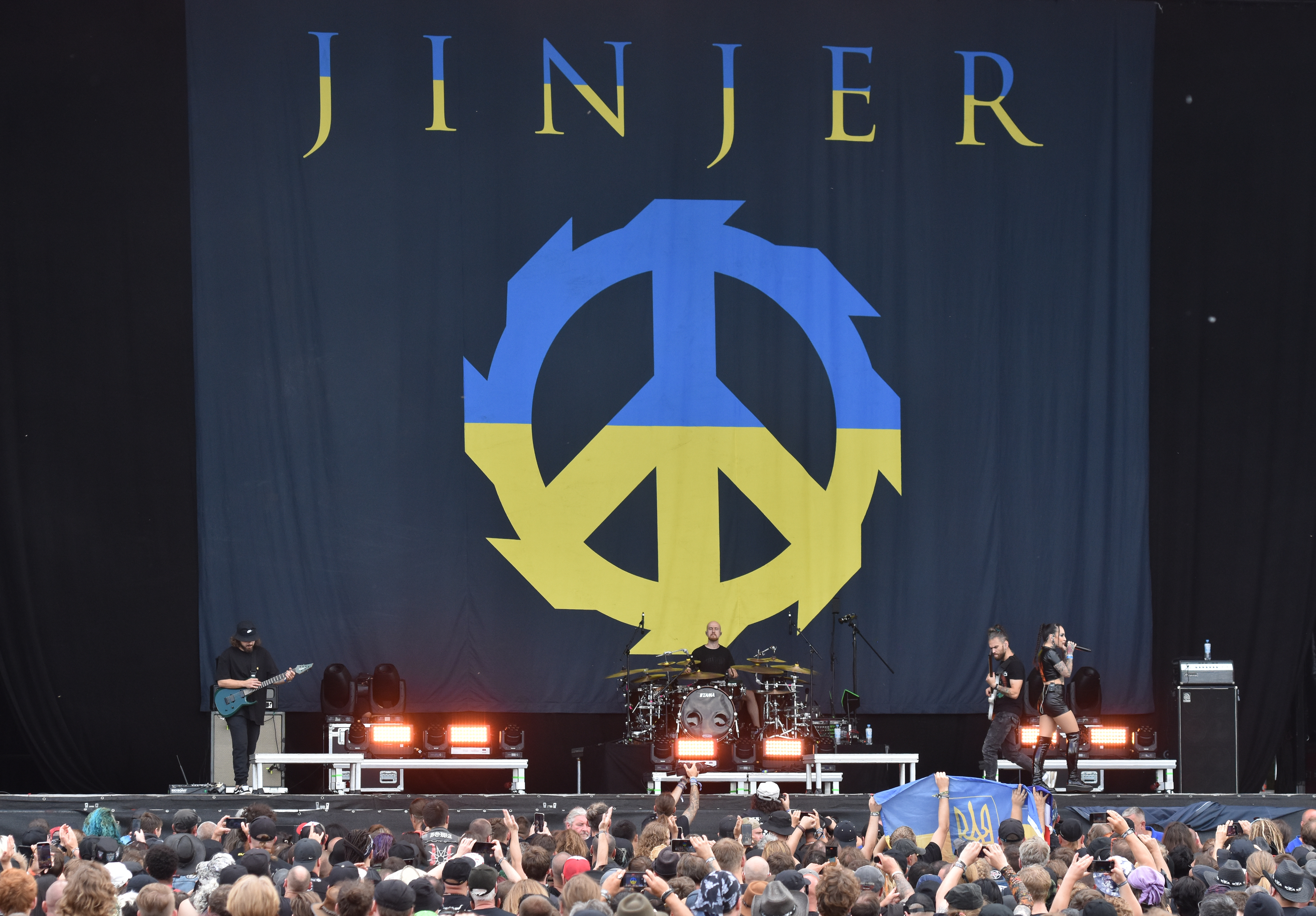
- Jinjer performing in 2023

Background information
- Origin: Donetsk, Ukraine
- Genres: Metalcore; progressive metal; groove metal; djent
- Years active: 2008–present
- Labels: Napalm; The Leaders
- Members: Tatiana Shmayluk; Roman Ibramkhalilov; Eugene Abdukhanov; Vladislav Ulasevich
- Past members: Dmitriy Oksen; Maksym Fatullaiev; Vyacheslav Okhrimenko; Oleksandr Koziychuk; Yevhen Mantulin; Dmitriy Kim
- Website: jinjer-metal.com

Jinjer (/ˈdʒɪndʒər/ "ginger") is a Ukrainian metalcore band from Donetsk, formed in 2008. None of the founding members remain with the band. The current lineup considers 2009 as its official year of formation, with the arrival of singer Tatiana Shmayluk and guitarist Roman Ibramkhalilov. The band has since added bassist Eugene Abdukhanov and drummer Vladislav Ulasevich. Their fifth studio album, Duél, was released in February 2025.

== History ==
Jinjer was formed in 2008 by singer Maksym Fatullaiev, guitarist Dmitriy Oksen, bassist Oleksiy Svynar, and drummer Vyacheslav Okhrimenko. This lineup released the four-song EP Objects in Mirror Are Closer than They Appear. In 2009, Fatullaiev was replaced by Tatiana Shmayluk, and Roman Ibramkhalilov joined on second guitar. In 2011, Oleksiy Svynar was replaced by Eugene Abdukhanov, while Okhrimenko was replaced by Oleksandr Koziychuk.

This lineup self-released the EP Inhale, Do Not Breathe in 2012 and Jinjer began relentlessly touring on their own funds. They were noticed by the Leaders Records in late 2012, and Inhale, Don't Breathe was officially re-released in 2013 in an extended format, with three live tracks. The band won the Best Ukrainian Metal Act award held by Kyiv's InshaMuzyka label in 2013 (they would win that award again in 2016).

Jinjer self-released their first full-length album, Cloud Factory, in 2014; the record featured another new drummer, Yevhen Mantulin. It would later be picked up and re-released by their current record label, Napalm. Jinjer began touring internationally and personally booked their own shows. The final remaining founding member, Dmitriy Oksen, departed in 2015 and was not replaced, leaving Ibramkhalilov as sole guitarist.

While the band was on tour in 2014, Mantulin fell out of a third-story window and suffered severe injuries, severing his spine and rupturing his spleen and thus being unable to continue playing drums. He was replaced by Dmitriy Kim.

After several world tours, Jinjer released their second full-length album, King of Everything, in 2016, which was preceded by the single "Pisces". In 2021, Metal Hammer placed "Pisces" at No. 74 in their list of "The 100 Greatest Metal Songs of the 21st Century". Shortly after the release of King of Everything, drummer Vladislav Ulasevich joined and the band's lineup has remained stable since.

In 2017, Jinjer committed to two tours across Europe in support of Arch Enemy, followed by their first tour of North America, alongside Cradle of Filth, in 2018. The band also reissued their 2014 album, Cloud Factory, on Napalm Records in February 2018. In September of that year, Jinjer landed on the Billboard Next Big Sound chart. They released the five-track EP Micro in January 2019, followed by tours with Amorphis, Soilwork, and Nailed to Obscurity.

Their third full-length album, Macro, was released in October 2019 and featured experiments in reggae and progressive rock. Loudwire named it one of the fifty best metal albums of 2019. Jinjer was forced to cancel several tours, including their first in Latin America, due to the COVID-19 pandemic. They released the live album Alive in Melbourne in November 2020. They then returned to Kaska Record Studios in Kyiv in March 2021, and their fourth full-length album, Wallflowers, was released on 27 August. Loudwire ranked it among the best rock/metal albums of the year again, placing it at #21.

In March 2022, it was reported that Jinjer had "paused" their career to focus on relief efforts in Ukraine after Russia invaded the country one month prior. In June 2022, Jinjer announced that they received permission from the Ukrainian Ministry of Culture to leave Ukraine and tour as ambassadors of the nation.

In June 2024, Jinjer confirmed the completion of their fifth studio album and announced plans to debut new songs on their upcoming North American tour. The record, titled Duél, was released on 7 February 2025.

== Musical style and influences ==
Jinjer have mentioned many influences for their music, including Guano Apes, Slayer, Death, Pantera, Anathema, Lamb of God, Gojira, and Twelve Foot Ninja. While referencing their influences, the band have mentioned metal acts such as Opeth, Karnivool, and Textures, in addition to groups performing R&B, soul, funk, jazz, reggae, and hip-hop (Cypress Hill and House of Pain).

They have been noted for progressive experiments with genres such as R&B, soul, funk, jazz, reggae, and groove metal. Bassist Eugene Abdukhanov is known for using a five-string bass to supplement the group's sound since Roman Ibramkhalilov became the sole guitarist. The band's more recent releases have featured lyrics addressing the war in Donbas and its effects on their home region of Donetsk.

== Band members ==
Jinjer performing at Wacken 2019

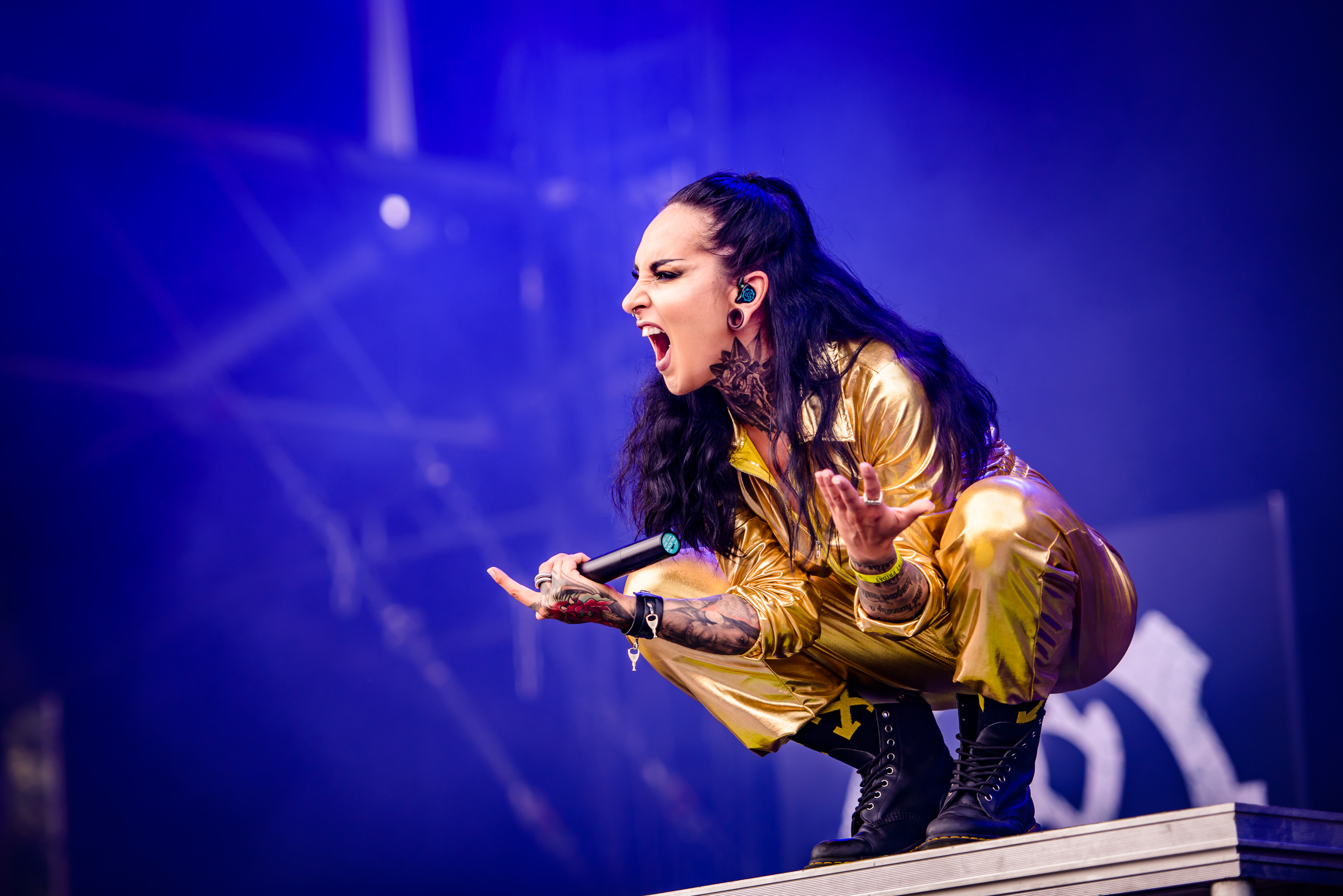
Tatiana Shmayluk

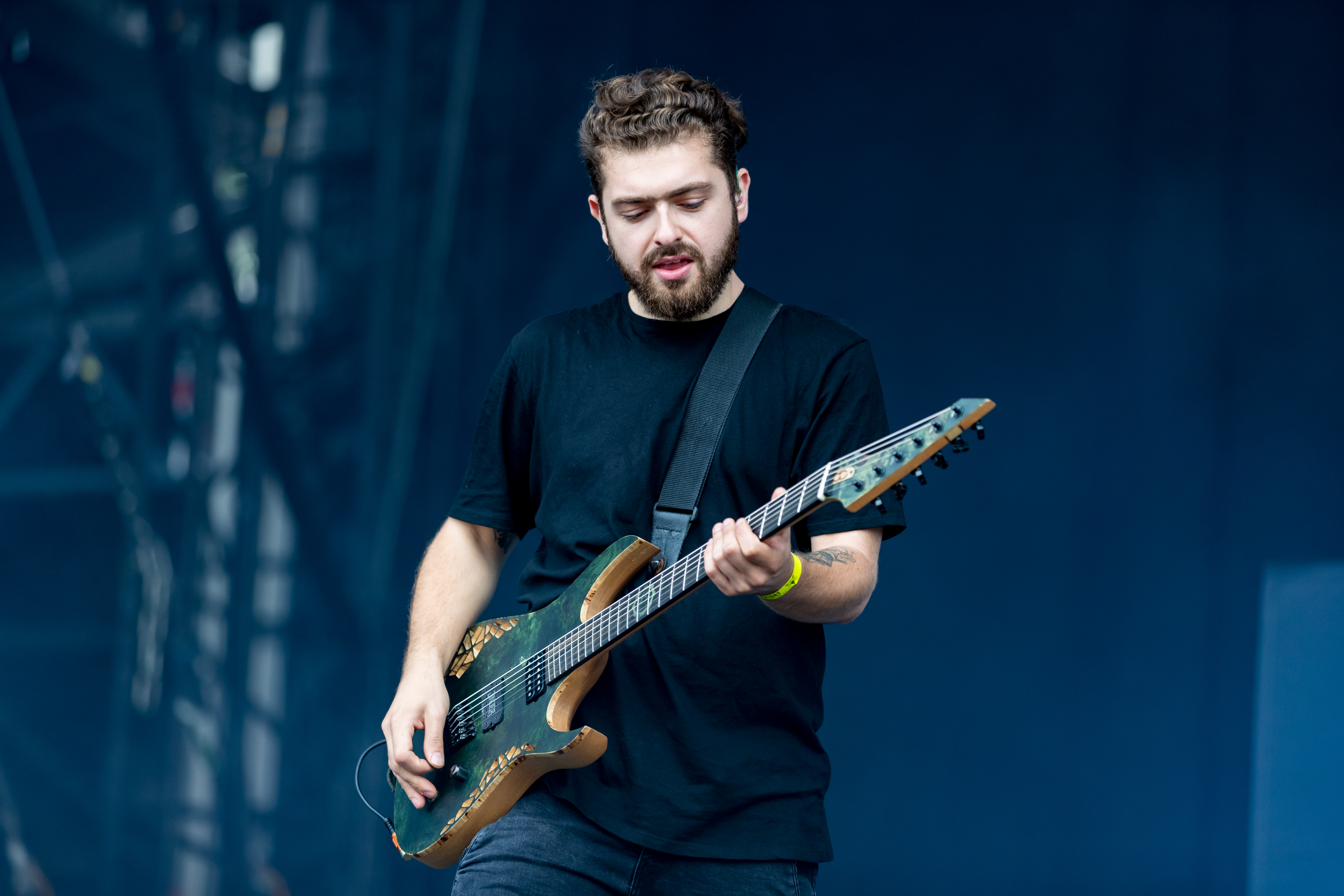
Roman Ibramkhalilov

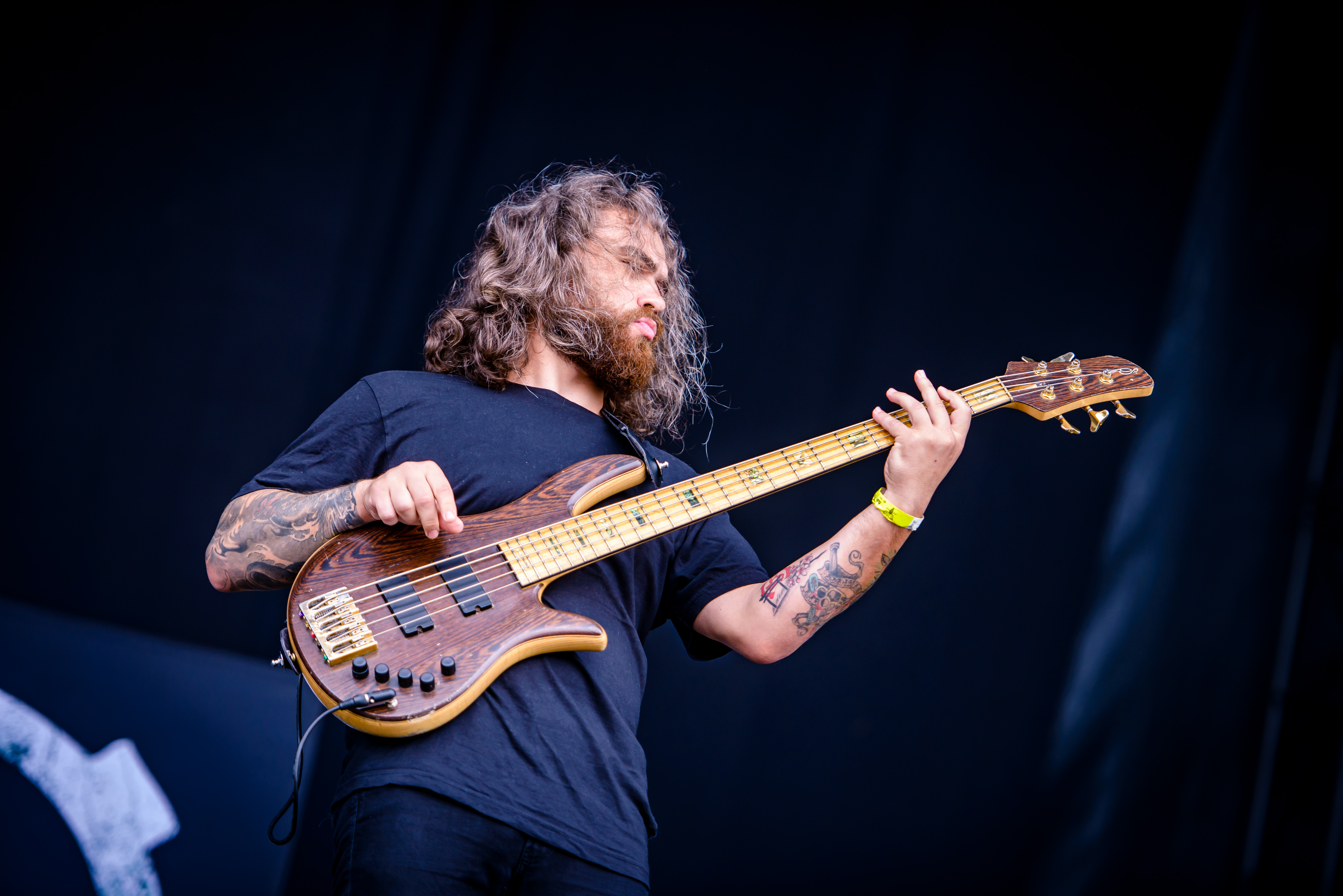
Eugene Abdukhanov

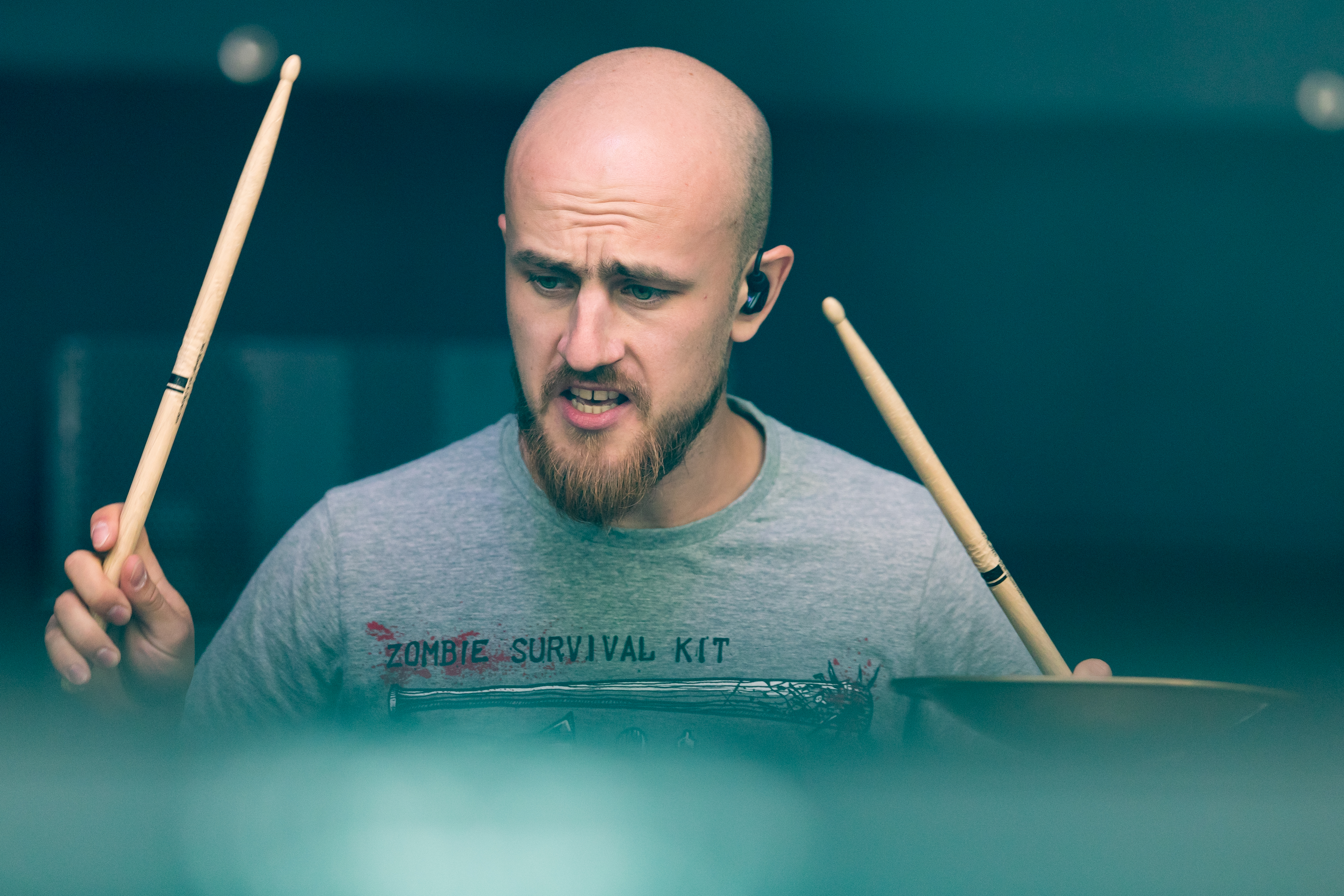
Vladislav Ulasevich

Current

- Tatiana "Tati" Shmayluk – vocals (2009–present)
- Roman Ibramkhalilov – guitars (2009–present)
- Eugene Abdukhanov – bass (2011–present)
- Vladislav "Vladi" Ulasevich – drums (2016–present)

Former

- Maksym Fatullaiev – vocals (2008–2009)
- Vyacheslav Okhrimenko – drums (2008–2011)
- Rostyslav Lobachov – lead guitar (2008–2010)
- Oleksandr Koziychuk – drums (2011–2013)
- Oleksiy Svynar – bass (2008–2011)
- Yevhen Mantulin – drums (2013–2014)
- Dmitriy Oksen – rhythm guitar (2008–2015)
- Dmitriy Kim – drums (2014–2016)

Timeline

== Discography ==
Studio albums

List of albums
Title	Album details
Cloud Factory	Released: 2014; Label: Self-released
King of Everything	Released: 29 July 2016; Label: Napalm
Macro	Released: 25 October 2019; Label: Napalm
Wallflowers	Released: 27 August 2021; Label: Napalm
Duél	Released: 7 February 2025; Label: Napalm

EPs

- Objects in Mirror Are Closer Than They Appear (2009)
- Inhale, Do Not Breathe (2012)
- Micro (2019)

Live albums

- Alive in Melbourne (2020)
- Live in Los Angeles (2024)
