= Suite of Old American Dances =

Suite of Old American Dances is a 1949 concert band work by Robert Russell Bennett. Chappell Music published the condensed score and parts in 1952. This score gives the overall duration of its five movements (I. Cake Walk, II. Schottische, III. Western One-Step, IV. Wallflower Waltz, V. Rag) as 16:30. Hal Leonard Corp. published a full-score edition, prepared by Edward Higgins, c. 1999. The numerous commercial and archival recordings of the piece since the 1950s provide a measure of its popularity.

== Instrumentation ==
The 1952 Chappell score lists the following as the work's instrumentation: piccolo, 1st-2nd flutes, 1st-2nd oboes (2nd doubl. English horn), 1st-2nd bassoons, Eb clarinet, Solo-1st-2nd-3rd Bb clarinets, alto clarinet, bass clarinet, AATB saxophones, Solo-1st-2nd-3rd Bb cornets, 1st-2nd trumpet, 1st-2nd-3rd-4th horns, 1st-2nd-3rd trombones, baritone/euphonium (treble and bass clef parts), tuba ("Basses"), string bass, timpani, and percussion (snare drum, bass drum, cymbals, triangle, bells, vibraphone, xylophone, wood blocks, sandpaper [blocks]).

== Creation, première, original title ==
According to the composer, the catalyst for the work’s creation was a rare indoor concert by the Goldman Band in Carnegie Hall:

When Edwin Franko Goldman arrived at his seventieth birthday it was celebrated by a concert sponsored by the League of Composers. For the concert they engaged the Goldman Band of New York and asked Dr. Goldman to conduct his own band in honor of his own anniversary. [My wife] Louise and I went to that [3 January 1948] concert and I suddenly thought of all the beautiful sounds the American concert band could make that it hadn’t yet made. That doesn’t mean that the unmade sounds passed in review in my mind at all, but the sounds they made were so new to me after all my years with orchestra, dance bands and tiny “combos” that my pen was practically jumping out of my pocket begging me to give this great big instrument some more music to play.

To satisfy this urging I found time to put a good-sized piece on paper. There was really no such thing as spare time for me at that time, but somehow I got a part done here and a part done there and one day there was this piece to show Dr. Edwin Franko Goldman to see if he was interested in adding one more idiom to his great collection.

Dr. Goldman and his son Richard, also a doctor, became very warm friends indeed and gave the new piece a great send-off. It was published with the name Suite of Old American Dances. I had a nice name for it, but you know how publishers are—they know their customers, and we authors never seem to. My name for it was Electric Park. Electric Park in Kansas City was a place of magic to us kids. The tricks with big electric signs, the illuminated fountains, the big band concerts, the scenic railway and the big dance hall—all magic. In the dance hall all afternoon and evening you could hear the pieces the crowds danced to, and the five movements of my piece were samples of the dances of the day.”

The Goldman Band premiered the suite, with the composer conducting, in Central Park, New York, on 17 June 1949, and performed it several additional times that summer.

== Bennett's 1949 program note ==
The composer supplied a brief program note for the 1949 Goldman première:

"As far as notes for the program are concerned, there's no particular purpose in mind in the composition of the Suite except to do a modern, and, I hope, entertaining version of some of the dance moods of my early youth. Another equally important purpose was to do a number without any production tie-up such as World's Fairs and municipal pageants, for symphonic band, and particularly for your band [the Goldman Band].”

Among the "productions" Bennett refers to is the 1939 New York World's Fair for which he composed some 90 minutes of concert band music for the nightly "Lagoon of Nations" spectacles.

== Orchestral version ==
Soon after the work’s premiere—and before publication of the concert band original—Bennett prepared an orchestra transcription (copyrighted 16 June 1950). He guest-conducted a Cleveland Orchestra performance on 2 August 1958. Other early orchestral performances included those by San Francisco’s Standard Symphony Orchestra (radio, 9 July 1950), the St. Louis Symphony (30 December 1950), Buffalo Philharmonic (2 February 1951), the Long Island Symphony Society (11 December 1954), and—in Central Park—The Naumburg Symphony Orchestra, 31 July 1960 (Bennett conducting). Chappell Music offered for sale a full orchestra score (a reproduction of Bennett’s inked holograph) by late 1950.

== Early performances ==
The concert band original was copyrighted on 17 June 1952 (technically as an “arrangement” of the already-copyrighted orchestra setting) and published later that year. Pre-publication performances include one by the Ohio State University Concert Band (Manley Whitcomb, cond.), 1 April 1951.

In spring 1953, ASCAP and NBC jointly sponsored a series of 13 weekly broadcasts from the Eastman School, devoted entirely to American composers. Two of the concerts were allotted to Frederick Fennell's Eastman Wind Ensemble, and the 23 March broadcast brought two of the suite's movements to a national audience.

Other early performances include a 27 February 1953 presentation at Cleveland's Severance Hall by the Baldwin-Wallace Concert Band and its inclusion on the U.S. Marine Band's fall 1953 tour, in and around New York State.

== Frederick Fennell and the Suite of Old American Dances ==
Frederick Fennell and his Eastman Wind Ensemble made the first commercial recording of the work (Mercury MG 40006, 1953). In consultation with Bennett, Fennell authored an extensive 1979 article about the piece, aimed at conductors, for The Instrumentalist magazine. In that article, he described the circumstances of the work's creation in 1948-49, while Bennett was occupied with orchestrations for such Broadway musicals as Inside U.S.A., Sally, Heaven on Earth, Kiss Me, Kate, All for Love, and South Pacific:

“No full score was ever written by Bennett and none [as of 1979] is currently available from the publishers. He wrote out the parts, one at a time from the short score, over a period of two years. Months would elapse between the writing of the second and then the third clarinet part, for instance. He would return to New York after a period away scoring a new show, dash off another part and leave again for other work. The cohesive nature of the writing, of course, shows none of the peripatetic pursuits. The scoring, however, shows his long service to the theater, revealing a superior knowledge of voice leading and projecting—perhaps technique of the sort one can’t really learn but merely perfect.”

== Precursor ==
One movement of the piece has its origins in an orchestral Theme and Variations of Bennett's given a network radio premiere in 1941 (WOR/Mutual Broadcasting System) on his “Russell Bennett’s Note Book” weekly program. As with Suite of Old American Dances eight years later, its various movements reflect the characteristic dances of his young years (including a Turkey Trot, Rag, One-Step, Waltz Clog, and Cake Walk); it is the “One-Step” movement that was developed and expanded into Suite's “Western One-Step” movement.
