= Robert Russell Bennett =

American composer (1894–1981)

Background information
- Born: June 15, 1894; Kansas City, Missouri, U.S.
- Died: August 18, 1981 (aged 87) Manhattan, New York, U.S.
- Genres: Broadway, Classical
- Occupations: Composer, arranger
- Instruments: Piano, violin, trumpet

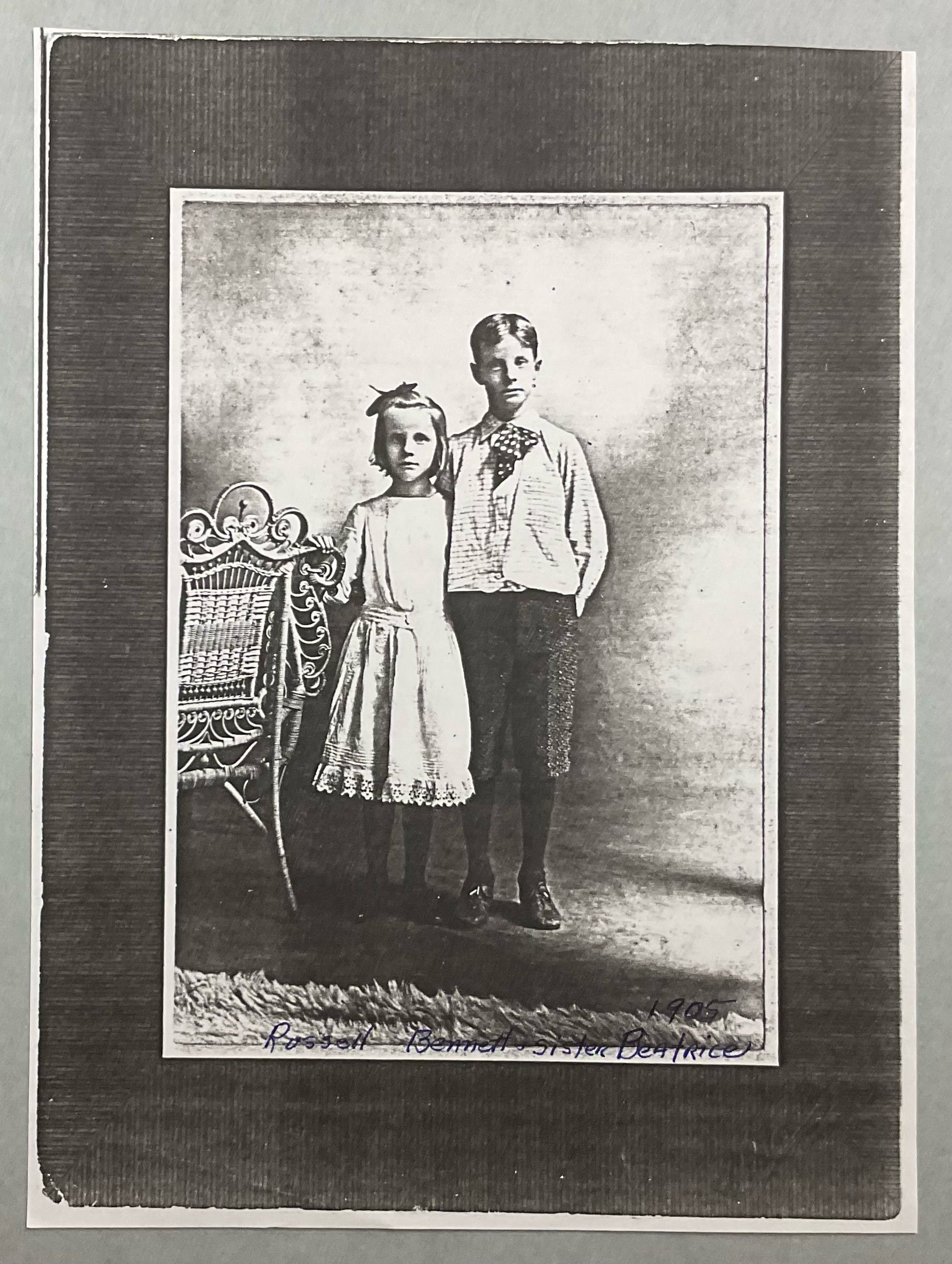
Childhood photo of Robert Russell Bennett

Robert Russell Bennett (June 15, 1894 – August 18, 1981) was an American composer and arranger, best known for his orchestration of many well-known Broadway and Hollywood musicals by other composers such as Irving Berlin, George Gershwin, Jerome Kern, Cole Porter, and Richard Rodgers.

In 1957 and 2008, Bennett received special Tony Awards recognizing his orchestrations for Broadway shows. Early in his career, he was often billed as Russell Bennett.

== Life and career ==
=== Early life ===
Robert Russell Bennett was born in 1894 to a musical family in Kansas City, Missouri. His father, George Bennett, played violin in the Kansas City Symphony and trumpet at the Grand Opera House, while his mother, May, worked as a pianist and teacher. She taught Bennett piano, while his father taught him violin and trumpet.

The Bennett family moved to a farm in Freeman, Missouri, when Bennett was four, to speed his recovery from polio. He graduated as the Valedictorian of Freeman High School. By that time, he had demonstrated his aptitude for music and his remarkable ear by picking out the finale of Beethoven's "Moonlight" Sonata on the white keys of the piano. By his early adolescence, his father often called upon him to play any given instrument as a utility member or substitute player within Bennett's Band in Freeman.

In his autobiography, Bennett recalled finding a ragtime tune on the piano at age ten and being informed by his mother that such music was trash—this lesson taught him to be, as he called it, a "life-long musical snob". His mother also taught his academic lessons until he was twelve due to health concerns; his health remained an obstacle when Bennett later decided to join the Army.

=== Early career ===
After completing his secondary education, Bennett moved to Kansas City to be a freelance musician, performing throughout the city as well as with the symphony. He also began his first musical training outside of a home environment with Danish composer-conductor Dr. Carl Busch. Busch taught him counterpoint and harmony until 1916, when Bennett took his savings and moved to New York City. He eventually found a job as a copyist with G. Schirmer while continuing to freelance and to build a network of contacts, particularly with the New York Flute Club.

In 1917 he volunteered for the Army. Although he yearned for an active role, his youthful health woes caused the draft board to mark him for limited service. However, he successfully appealed this classification and became the director of the 70th Infantry Band at Camp Funston, Kansas. He valiantly attempted to improve the "disgraceful" musical standards of the unit, but found his efforts thwarted when the Spanish flu swept through the post in 1918.

Upon his discharge several months later, he returned to New York. His relationship with Winifred Edgerton Merrill, a society matron who had been the first woman to receive a doctorate from Columbia University, led to rewards both financial and emotional—she had been one of his first employers in the city, and she introduced him to her daughter Louise, whom he married on December 26, 1919. Their daughter, Jean, was born a year later. Bennett later studied composition in Paris with Nadia Boulanger 1926-1929.

=== Broadway arranger ===
His career as an arranger began to blossom in 1919 while he was employed by T.B. Harms, a prominent publishing firm for Broadway and Tin Pan Alley. Dependable yet creative within the confines of formulaic arranging, Bennett soon branched out as an orchestrator and arranger for Broadway productions, collaborating particularly with Jerome Kern.

Although Bennett would work with several of the top names on Broadway and in film including George Gershwin, Cole Porter, and Kurt Weill, his collaborations with Jerome Kern and Richard Rodgers stand out both for sheer volume and for highlighting different facets of an arranger's relationship with a composer. Bennett described his own philosophy: "The perfect arrangement is one that manages to be most 'becoming' to the melody at all points."

With Jerome Kern

Kern's working relationship with Bennett serves as a clear illustration of this point. For example, when orchestrating Show Boat, Bennett would work from sketches laid out quite specifically by Kern, which included melodies, rough parts, and harmonies. The original sketches appear remarkably close to Bennett's completed scores; as one scholar puts it, "Bennett didn't have much to make up."

With Richard Rodgers

In contrast, Rodgers allowed Bennett a greater degree of autonomy. The pair had first collaborated in 1927, but the majority of their partnership occurred in the 1940s and 1950s. While scoring Oklahoma! in 1943, Bennett proved himself invaluable by reworking an elaborate and possibly out-of-place selection into the title song. His most legendary contribution to the partnership, however, occurred during the scoring of the television series Victory at Sea (1952–53).

Richard Rodgers contributed twelve basic themes for the series, with three earmarked for the first episode; Rodgers's Victory at Sea manuscripts total seventeen pages. The Rodgers themes total about twelve minutes of music, and are employed by Bennett in a bit more than two hours of the series' scoring, which amounts to more than 11-1/2 hours of orchestra music.

Rodgers commented on Bennett's Victory at Sea contributions: "I give him [the credit] without undue modesty, for making my music sound better than it was."

With George Gershwin

With Gershwin and his Broadway musical scores, Bennett would work from annotated short scores (dual folios for piano with general suggestions for which instruments would play what.) He worked very closely as Gershwin's assistant during the period in which Gershwin composed his score for the 1937 Fred Astaire-Ginger Rogers film, Shall We Dance, often spending late nights with Gershwin rushing to complete orchestrations for deadlines. The next year Gershwin died. Later Bennett would be turned to yet again as a definitive orchestrator of Gershwin's other works, both on Porgy and Bess: A Symphonic Picture and the orchestral medley, "Gershwin in Hollywood".

=== Other commissions ===
Sergei Rachmaninoff was engaged in writing a 2-piano reduction of his Piano Concerto No. 4, containing his final revisions, when death overtook him. Robert Russell Bennett completed the reduction at the request of Rachmaninoff's widow.

=== Musical profile ===
Schooled by his mother to disdain popular music, Robert Russell Bennett found the dichotomy between his serious compositions and his arranging work to be a lifelong struggle. In spite of his prolific output, which included the opera Maria Malibran, more than seven symphonies, a large variety of chamber works, and at least five concertos, his reputation today as a classical composer rests primarily on two oft-recorded pieces, the Suite of Old American Dances and Symphonic Songs for Band.

This may be attributed both to the modesty so characteristic of Bennett and to the Eastman Wind Ensemble recordings which popularized them. In his composing, Bennett brought to bear his considerable talent for orchestration as well as a gift for conceiving melodies and harmonic structure in his head; longtime Bennett copyist Adele Combattente (of Chappell Music) confirmed his ability to write parts in score order, as opposed to filling in leftover parts and doublings as he completed primary melodic lines. He nearly always scored directly in ink, rather than pencil.

Many of Bennett's original works came about through direct commission; the 1939 World's Fair, CBS radio ("Hollywood" for orchestra), and the League of Composers ("Mademoiselle" for the Goldman Band) provide prominent examples. A significant number of commissions were initiated by Robert Austin Boudreau, a former member of the Goldman Band, and his American Wind Symphony.

The AWS traveled via American rivers and waterways, inspiring several works with nautical themes, including the Ohio River Suite and West Virginia Epic. Boudreau would provide a basic concept to Bennett, who would complete the new work rapidly and who would always attend the premiere. Boudreau recalls, "We never offered him a lot of money for those commissions...He was an elegant person. He was always more interested in music than in dollars."

Many works were written for his musical acquaintances, including Hexapoda and a concerto for violinist Louis Kaufman, Tema Sporca con Variazoni for duo-pianists Appleton and Field, Suite for Flute and B flat Clarinet for Frances Blaisdell and Alex Williams, and the Rondo Capriccioso for Georges Barrére (Bennett's friendship with flutists William Kincaid and John Wummer prompted other chamber works).

In 1960, he conducted the Naumburg Orchestral Concerts, in the Naumburg Bandshell, Central Park, in the summer series.

== Later years ==
In later years, Bennett again developed major health problems. "He never talked about it, but always showed joy," Boudreau states. "It wasn't just a business relationship we had, it was more than just music. We were pals, and he would treat me as a son."

Bennett did not slow his output, creating original works for the nation's bicentennial celebrations and accepting commissions from a variety of sources, including a Presbyterian church in Florida, for which he accepted only a modest fee.

== Death and legacy ==
Bennett died of liver cancer in 1981, aged 87. His legacy rests largely on the popular arrangements which so conflicted the composer, but those who knew him also remember him as a close friend and gracious mentor. Robert Shaw wrote, "And it is just as certainly because of his kindness, honesty, humor, and wisdom that our hearts are warmed to see Robert Russell Bennett without peer in his field."

Bennett mentored Broadway and concert arranger William David Brohn; they first worked together on the 1966 Lincoln Center revival of Show Boat.

== List of works (incomplete) ==
=== Books ===
1. "'The Broadway Sound': the Autobiography and Collected Essays of Robert Russell Bennett," ed. George J. Ferencz. University of Rochester Press, 1999.
2. Instrumentally Speaking. Belwin-Mills, 1975.

=== Original compositions (selected) ===
==== Orchestra ====
1. Abraham Lincoln: A Likeness in Symphony Form ["Abraham Lincoln" Symphony] (1929)
2. Adagio Eroico (To The Memory of a Soldier) (c. 1932)
3. An Adventure in High Fidelity (1954; commissioned by RCA Victor for a demonstration LP)
4. Antique Suite for Clarinet and Orchestra (1941; dedicated to Benny Goodman)
5. Charleston Rhapsody [small orchestra] (1926, rev. 1933)
6. Classic Serenade for Strings [Portraits of Three Friends] (1941)
7. A Commemoration Symphony: Stephen Collins Foster [SATB Chorus, vocal soloists, and orchestra] (1959)
8. Concerto for Harmonica and Orchestra (1971 or 1972)
9. Concerto for Viola, Harp and Orchestra (1940 or 1941; revised c. 1960 for cello, harp and orchestra)
10. Concerto for Violin in A Major (1941)
11. Concerto for Violin, Piano and Orchestra (1958 or 1959)
12. Concerto Grosso for Dance Band and Orchestra [Sketches from an American Theatre] (1932)
13. Concert Variations on a Crooner's Theme [violin and orchestra] (1949)
14. A Dry Weather Legend [flute and orchestra] (1946)
15. An Early American Ballade on Melodies of Stephen Foster [small orchestra] (1932)
16. Eight Etudes For Symphony Orchestra (1938)
17. "The Four Freedoms"—A Symphony after Four Paintings by Norman Rockwell (1943)
18. Hollywood [Introduction and Scherzo] (1936)
19. Kansas City Album [Seven Songs for Orchestra] (1949)
20. March for Two Pianos and Orchestra (1930)
21. Nocturne and Appassionata [piano and orchestra] (1941)
22. Orchestral Fragments from the American Opera "Maria Malibran" (1934)
23. Overture To An Imaginary Drama [dedicated to Fritz Mahler] (1946)
24. Overture to the Mississippi (1950)
25. Paysage [Landscape] (1927 or 1928)
26. Piano Concerto in B Minor (1947)
27. Sights and Sounds [an Orchestral Entertainment] (1929)
28. Six Variations in Fox-Trot Time on a Theme by Jerome Kern [chamber orchestra] (1933)
29. Suite of Old American Dances (1950 orchestration of his 1949 original for concert band)
30. Symphony [#1] (1926)
31. Symphony [dedicated to Fritz Reiner] (1962)
32. Symphony in D for the Dodgers (1941; a WOR radio commission, with narrator "Red" Barber in the final movement)

==== Stage works ====
1. Columbine [pantomime ballet w/theater orchestra] (1916)
2. Crystal [opera] (1972)
3. The Enchanted Kiss [opera] (1944 or 1945)
4. Endimion [operetta-ballet] (1926 or 1927)
5. Hold Your Horses [musical comedy; words and music by Russell Bennett, Robert A. Simon and Owen Murphy] (1933)
6. An Hour of Delusion [one-act opera] (1928)
7. Maria Malibran [opera; libretto by Robert A. Simon] (1934)
8. Princess Charming [musical play; music and lyrics mostly by Albert Sirmay and Harry Ruby, with additional songs by Russell Bennett and Jack Waller] (1926)

==== Incidental music ====
1. The Firebrand [play by Edwin Justus Mayer; music by Bennett and Maurice Nitke] (1924)
2. Hamlet [starring John Barrymore] (1922)
3. Macbeth [starring Lionel Barrymore] (1921)
4. Romeo and Juliet [starring Ethel Barrymore] (1922)

==== Concert band or wind orchestra ====
1. Autobiography (1977)
2. Christmas Overture (1980 or 1981)
3. Concerto Grosso for Wind Quintet and Wind Orchestra (1957)
4. Down to the Sea in Ships (1969, from the NBC TV Film "Project 20")
5. Fanfare for the American Wind Symphony (1981)
6. Fountain Lake Fanfare [March] (1939; for the New York World's Fair)
7. Four Preludes for Band (1974)
8. Mademoiselle (1952)
9. Ohio River Suite (1959)
10. Overture to The Pickle Suite (1969)
11. Overture to Ty, Tris and Willie (1961)
12. Rose Variations [cornet/trumpet and band] (1955)
13. Suite of Old American Dances (1949)
14. Symphonic Songs for Band (1957)
15. The Pickle (poem by Sara Henderson Hay) (1969)
16. Three Humoresques (c. 1961)
17. A TNT Cocktail (1939; for the New York World's Fair)
18. Tone Poems for Band (1939; for the New York World's Fair)
19. Track Meet (1960)
20. West Virginia Epic (1960)
21. Zimmer's American Greeting [narrator and wind orchestra] (1974)

==== Chamber music ====
1. Allemande (violin and piano, 1947 or 1948)
2. Arabesque (brass quintet, 1978)
3. Clarinet Quartet (late 1920s?)
4. Dance (flute and piano, 1928)
5. Dance Scherzo (wind quintet, 1937)
6. Five Improvisations on Exotic Scales (flute, cello, piano, 1947)
7. Five Tune Cartoons (violin and piano, 1948)
8. Four Dances for Piano Trio (1953 or 1954)
9. Hexapoda ["five studies in Jitteroptera"] (violin and piano, 1940)
10. Nocturne (flute and piano, 1928)
11. Rondo Capriccioso (four flutes, 1916)
12. Six Souvenirs (two flutes and piano, 1948)
13. Sonata (violin and piano, 1927)
14. Sonatine (soprano and harp, 1947)
15. A Song Sonata (violin and piano, 1947)
16. String Quartet (1956)
17. Suite for Flute and B flat Clarinet (c. 1958; published 1973)
18. Tema Sporca (two pianos, four hands, 1946)
19. Toy Symphony (wind quintet, 1928)
20. Trio (flute, cello, piano, 1950 or 1951)
21. Trio (harp, cello, flute, c. 1960)
22. Water Music (string quartet, 1937)

==== Keyboard works ====
1. Four Nocturnes (accordion, 1959)
2. Seven Fox Trots in Concert Form (piano, 1928)
3. Sonata in G (organ, 1929)
4. Sonatina (piano, c. 1941)
5. Second Sonatina (piano, c. 1944)
6. VU ("Seen in Paris") [20 etudes in miniature, from the 20 arrondissements of Paris] (1929)

=== Broadway arrangements and orchestrations (a selection) ===
1. Hirsch: Mary (1920)
2. Friml, Hammerstein and Harbach: Rose-Marie (1924)
3. Gershwin: Oh, Kay! (1926)
4. Kern and Hammerstein: Show Boat (1927) (new orchestrations 1946 and 1966)
5. Gershwin: Girl Crazy (1930)
6. Gershwin: Of Thee I Sing (1931)
7. Kern and Harbach: The Cat and the Fiddle (1931)
8. Kern and Hammerstein: Music in the Air (1932)
9. Porter: Anything Goes (1934) (with Hans Spialek)
10. Porter: Jubilee (1935)
11. Rodgers and Hammerstein: Oklahoma! (1943)
12. Bizet, Hammerstein: Carmen Jones (1943) (shared with Georges Bizet, composer of the 1875 opera Carmen)
13. Irving Berlin: Annie Get Your Gun (1946)
14. Harburg and Lane: Finian's Rainbow (1947) (shared with Don Walker)
15. Rodgers and Hammerstein: Allegro (1947)
16. Porter: Kiss Me, Kate (1948)
17. Rodgers and Hammerstein: South Pacific (1949)
18. Rodgers and Hammerstein: The King and I (1951)
19. Rodgers and Hammerstein: Pipe Dream (1955)
20. Lerner and Loewe: My Fair Lady (1956) (shared with Philip J. Lang)
21. Styne, Comden, and Green: Bells Are Ringing (1956)
22. Rodgers and Hammerstein: Flower Drum Song (1958)
23. Rodgers and Hammerstein: The Sound of Music (1959)
24. Lerner and Loewe: Camelot (1960) (shared with Philip J. Lang)
25. Lerner and Lane: On a Clear Day You Can See Forever (1965)

Bennett also did the orchestrations for the 1936 film version of Show Boat, and for the 1955 film version of Oklahoma! Some of his stage orchestrations were used in the 1958 film version of South Pacific, and the 1956 film version of The King and I and by Irwin Kostal for the 1965 film version of The Sound of Music.

He conducted the NBC Symphony Orchestra in Rodgers' Victory at Sea which was the soundtrack for the early 1950s TV documentary series of the same name; it was one of the first of its kind and billed as one most ambitious. RCA Victor released 5 volumes of music from the Rodgers' Victory at Sea score, all conducted by Robert Russell Bennett with cover art by Victor Kalin. (Vol. 1 - LM-2335; Vol. 2 - LM-2226; Vol.3 - ANL 1-1432; Three Suites; Video Disk)

He also orchestrated the score for the original television broadcast of Rodgers and Hammerstein's Cinderella in 1957.

=== Concert arrangements ===
In 1942, Bennett arranged Porgy and Bess: A Symphonic Picture as configured by conductor Fritz Reiner, using melodies from George Gershwin's now-celebrated opera. Bennett's arrangements were largely based on Gershwin's original orchestrations for the opera.

Bennett was also responsible for The Many Moods of Christmas, a 1963 48-minute medley of Christmas carols, arranged especially for the Robert Shaw Chorale and Orchestra. They recorded it that year, and in 1983, Robert Shaw re-recorded it with the Atlanta Symphony Chorus and the Atlanta Symphony Orchestra.

Among his published orchestra medleys for Broadway shows (including some for which others had done the original pit orchestrations) are those for Oklahoma!, Carousel, Allegro, Finian's Rainbow, Brigadoon, Lady in the Dark, Kiss Me, Kate, South Pacific, Roberta, The King and I, Me and Juliet, My Fair Lady, Gigi, Flower Drum Song, The Sound of Music, Camelot, On a Clear Day You Can See Forever, and Funny Girl, as well as extended "symphonic picture" settings of The Sound of Music and My Fair Lady.

His concert band medleys include those of Porgy and Bess, The King and I, Carousel Waltzes, Me and Juliet, Silk Stockings, My Fair Lady, Gigi, The Sound of Music, Funny Girl, and Do I Hear a Waltz?

The 40-minute Porgy and Bess: Concert Version for soprano and baritone soloists, chorus and orchestra was prepared in 1956. It is based very closely on Gershwin's original instrumental and vocal scoring, the principal recasting being the use of standard concert-orchestra instrumentation, and eliminating the clarinet-saxophone doubling specified in Gershwin's 1935 orchestration.

== Awards and honors ==
The Tony Award for orchestrations has only existed since 1997; Bennett was given a Special Tony Award in 1957 and again in 2008 "in recognition of his historic contribution to American musical theatre in the field of orchestrations, as represented on Broadway this season by Rodgers & Hammerstein's South Pacific." Other honors have included his Oscar for the film Oklahoma!, a 1962 Emmy award, television's Christopher Award in 1960, the City of New York's Handel Medallion in 1967, Los Angeles's honorary Scroll in 1979, and an honorary doctorate from Franklin and Marshall College in 1965.

Bennett was the first president of the American Society of Music Arrangers and Composers (ASMAC).
