= King of Everything (album) =

Studio album by Jinjer
- Released: 29 July 2016
- Recorded: 2016
- Studio: Morton Studio
- Genre: Metalcore, post-metal
- Length: 42:06
- Label: Napalm

Jinjer chronology
Cloud Factory (2014)	King of Everything (2016)	Macro (2019)

Singles from King of Everything
- 1. "Sit Stay Roll Over" Released: 6 October 2015; 2. "Words of Wisdom" Released: 15 April 2016; 3. "I Speak Astronomy" Released: 19 July 2016

Professional ratings
Review scores
Source	Rating
Louder Sound	4/5
New Noise Magazine	2/5
PlanetMosh	5/5
Soundscape	8/10

King of Everything is the second studio album by Ukrainian heavy metal band Jinjer. The album was released on 29 July 2016 through Napalm Records. It is the only album with drummer Dmitriy Kim. Shortly after the album's release, he was replaced by Vladislav Ulasevich and the band's lineup has remained stable since.

In 2021, Metal Hammer placed "Pisces" at No. 74 in their list of "The 100 Greatest Metal Songs of the 21st Century". In 2024, Emily Swingle of Metal Hammer named King of Everything as the best one of Jinjer's albums.

== Track listing ==
All tracks are written by Jinjer.

King of Everything track listing
No.	Title	Length
1.	"Prologue"	2:51
2.	"Captain Clock"	4:46
3.	"Words of Wisdom"	3:39
4.	"Just Another"	4:15
5.	"I Speak Astronomy"	5:54
6.	"Sit Stay Roll Over"	4:22
7.	"Under the Dome"	4:52
8.	"Dip a Sail"	4:14
9.	"Pisces"	5:06
10.	"Beggar's Dance"	2:07
Total length:		42:06
