= Max Watt's House of Music (Melbourne) =

Max Watt's House of Music is a live music venue on Swanston Street in Melbourne, Australia. The 850-capacity venue is in the basement of the Century Building designed by architect Marcus Barlow.

== Venue history ==
The venue originally opened in 1940 as the Century Theatre cinema. Over the subsequent decades it underwent various changes in name and focus, from newsreels to European films, before closing as a cinema in 1985.

The Hi-fi Bar & Ballroom opened in the former cinema in 1998, and become a major live music venue in Melbourne. In 2015, after being placed in administration, the venue became Max Watt's House of Music under new ownership.

The venue also hosts comedy as the Festival Club during the Melbourne International Comedy Festival, where the ABC's Comedy Up Late is filmed.
