= Herbert L. Clarke =

American conductor

Herbert Clarke
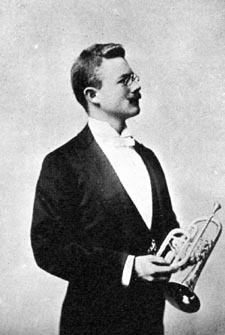
- Cornetist Herbert L. Clarke with instrument, early 1890s

Background information
- Born: Herbert Lincoln Clark; September 12, 1867; Woburn, Massachusetts, U.S.
- Origin: Massachusetts; Indianapolis; Toronto
- Died: January 30, 1945 (aged 77) Long Beach, California, U.S.
- Genres: classical, marches
- Occupations: Musician, bandmaster, composer, instructor
- Instruments: Cornet, trumpet, viola
- Years active: 1882–1945

Herbert Lincoln Clarke (September 12, 1867 – January 30, 1945) was an American cornetist, feature soloist, bandmaster, and composer. He is considered the most prominent cornetist of his time.

Clarke's legacy includes composing a portion of the standard repertoire for the instrument, many recordings, as well as a seminal school of playing which emphasized not only technical aptitude, but also increased warmth and lyricism of tone. He also produced several method books that are still used by brass students, for example the Clarke Studies.

== Early life ==
Clarke was born in Woburn, Massachusetts in 1867, the son of composer, organist, and organbuilder William Horatio Clarke. Herbert's family moved often to accommodate William's work engagements, from Massachusetts to Ohio, to Indiana, back to Massachusetts, and finally to Toronto, Canada in 1880. Herbert had two brothers, Edwin and Ernest. All three became prominent musicians: Edwin on cornet and flugelhorn (he also managed Sousa's Band in its 1911 world tour), Ernest on trombone (he became a professor of trombone at Juilliard), and Herbert on cornet.

Clarke's early musical instruction had been on the viola; by 1881, he was a second viola in the Toronto Philharmonic Society. However, according to his autobiography, one of the formative moments in his musical upbringing was attending a concert of D. W. Reeves' American Band of Providence, Rhode Island at the Horticultural Pavilion in Toronto in 1881, and hearing Bowen R. Church play a cornet solo. Herbert subsequently began practicing his brother's cornet and took a chair as a cornetist in the Queen's Own Rifle Band in 1882, in order to obtain a government-issued cornet on which to practice.

== Career ==
Between 1884, when he graduated from high school, and 1887, Clarke drifted between playing both viola and second cornet (when required) in the pit orchestra of English's Opera House in Indianapolis, where his family had moved; working (unhappily) at the John Kay store in Toronto, while playing second chair cornetist with the Queens's Own Band & Bugles; and playing at the Ontario Beach lake resort in the summer. He had joined the Queen's Own at the age of 14 (even though the legal age was 18), in order to obtain his first Cornet, a band owned Courtois. In Indianapolis, he would finally buy his own horn, a Boston 3-star cornet. It was with the When Clothing Store Band that in 1886, Clarke won a solo cornet contest and received a one-of-a-kind pocket cornet made by the famous instrument maker, Henry Distin of Williamsport, Pennsylvania, which can be seen at the Sousa Archives and Center for American Music at the University of Illinois at Urbana-Champaign.

In 1887, he joined the Citizen's Band of Toronto, under John Bayley, as the band's cornet soloist. He spent the next five years playing in and leading several bands around Toronto (the Taylor Safe Works Band, Heintzman Piano Company Band, Streetsville Ontario Band) and teaching viola at the Toronto Conservatory of Music (where he also played in the Toronto Conservatory String Quartet) and at the Trinity College School in Port Hope, Ontario. In the spring of 1892, he left Canada once again, after successfully auditioning for the 22nd Regiment N.Y.S.N.G Band in New York City, popularly known as "Gilmore's Band" and directed by Patrick Gilmore. He was introduced to Gilmore by his brother Ernest, who was already playing trombone with the band, and the audition took place at Gilmore's residence.

In 1893, Clarke joined John Philip Sousa’s band as a cornet soloist. After playing at the Chicago World's Fair in the same year, he left to play with various other bands, continuing to do so over the next five years. During this period, he held temporary positions as second trumpet with the New York Philharmonic and as principal trumpet in the Metropolitan Opera, for which he temporarily switched to trumpet.

In 1898, he returned to Sousa's band, with whom he toured extensively. However, in late 1901, Clarke himself became leader of The American Band—the band which had made such an impression on him in his youth—and moved to Providence, Rhode Island. Ironically, after only a year, the band voted Clarke out as director in favor of Bowen R. Church, the same cornetist Clarke had admired when he first heard the band under Reeves. Clarke then formed his own band in Providence and occasionally conducted other local ensembles; he also led both the American Band in 1902 and his own band ("Clarke's Band of Providence") in 1903 in recordings for the Victor Talking Machine Company. Clarke finally returned to Sousa's Band as solo cornet and assistant director in 1905 and conducted the band in many recording sessions for Victor at that time. Furthermore, he spent time testing and developing instruments for Conn Instruments in Elkhart, Indiana, and making a considerable number of solo recordings for Victor, Edison, Columbia, Odeon, England, and finally Brunswick. He resigned from Sousa's band in September 1917, as he had determined to retire from active solo work at the age of fifty after hearing Jules Levy continue to play well past his prime. (He did make a few final recordings for Brunswick Records in New York in 1922, possibly to oblige his old friend Walter Rogers, Brunswick's musical director at the time.) Clarke returned to Canada to lead the Anglo-Canadian Leather Company Band in Huntsville, Ontario from 1918 to 1923. During this time, he performed very little. Instead, he focused his efforts not only on conducting, but also on composition, and setting up his own school of cornet playing in Chicago.

He conducted the Long Beach Municipal Band from 1923 to 1943. In April 1934, he was elected President of the American Bandmasters Association. From 1936 until his death in 1945, he developed a friendship with and gave private lessons to Claude Gordon.

== Personal life ==
In September 1889, he married Elizabeth (Lizzie) Loudon, with whom he had two children: Vivian (Grace) in 1890 and James (Edward James Watkins) in 1892. He later divorced and married Lillian Bell Hause, with whom he had two more children, Ruby Bell and Herbert L. Clarke, Jr.

In 1923, he and his wife moved to Long Beach, California for her health.

Herbert Clarke died in 1945. His ashes were interred at the Congressional Cemetery in Washington, D.C., near the gravesite of John Philip Sousa. His papers and memorabilia are held at the Sousa Archives and Center for American Music at the University of Illinois at Urbana-Champaign.

== Notable works ==
Solo cornet compositions

Bride of the Waves
1913 recording

Clarke composed over 50 solos for cornet, many of which have experienced several editions. Here are his most famous pieces, with the date of the earliest publication included.

- Bride of the Waves (1904)
- Sounds from the Hudson (1904)
- Caprice Brilliante (1908)
- Southern Cross (1911)
- The Carnival of Venice (1912)
- From the Shores of the Mighty Pacific (1912)
- The Maid of the Mist (1912)
- The Debutante (1912)
- Sounds from the Hudson (Valse Brilliante) (1914)
- Stars in a Velvety Sky (1919)

Cornet and trombone

- Cousins (1904)
- Side Partners

Clarke Studies

- Elementary Studies (1909)
- Technical Studies (1912)
- Characteristic Studies (1915)
- Setting Up Drills (1929)

Prose

- How I Became A Cornetist (1934): an autobiography
