= Claude Gordon =

American trumpet player and band director

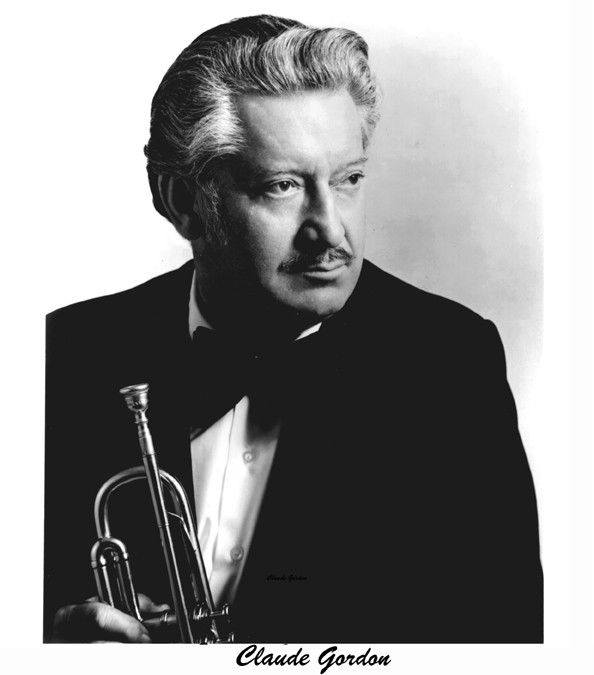

Background information
- Born: Claude Eugene Gordon; April 5, 1916; Helena, Montana, U.S.
- Origin: Helena; Los Angeles
- Died: May 16, 1996 (aged 80) Big Bear Lake, California, U.S.
- Genres: Big band, jazz, classical, Session music
- Occupations: Musician, band director, teacher
- Instruments: Cornet, trumpet, accordion
- Years active: 1936-1996

Claude Eugene Gordon (April 5, 1916 - May 16, 1996), nicknamed the "King of Brass", was an American trumpet player, band director, educator, lecturer and writer.

== Life ==
Claude Gordon was born on April 5, 1916, in Helena, Montana. His father, James Austin Gordon, was a clarinet player and orchestra director, and his mother, Nellie "Elge", was a pianist. His siblings formed a family orchestra, led by their father, that performed as the staff orchestra for a local radio station. Gordon was given his first cornet at the age of five, and three years later, in fifth grade, was featured as a soloist with the Helena High School Band. In his early teens, he began playing professionally and taught cornet and accordion.

In 1936, Gordon married Genevieve "Jenny" Pentecost. He raised two sons with her, Gary and Steven. Misfortune befell the family in 1988 when Jenny and Gary both died and Steven was diagnosed with cancer which led to his death in 1990. In September 1990, Gordon married Patricia "Patty" Jean Swanson, his longtime caretaker.

Gordon died from cancer on May 16, 1996. He is interred at Forest Lawn Memorial Park (Hollywood Hills).

== Career ==
Claude Gordon studied with Herbert L. Clarke from 1936 until Clarke died in 1945. During the era of live radio and television, Gordon worked as a studio trumpet player. In 1939, he was cast as the Roma accordion player in the Universal Studios musical film An Old Spanish Custom, later renamed In Rhumba Land. He formed his own big band in 1959. Their albums include Jazz For Jean-Agers and Sounds Of The Big Band Era.

Gordon performed with studio orchestras on shows including Amos and Andy and I Love Lucy.

The Claude Gordon Orchestra was awarded Best Big Band of 1959.

== Influence ==
=== Musical Instruments ===
Gordon worked with the Benge and Selmer companies designing trumpets; both companies produced a Claude Gordon model. He also designed trumpet and cornet mouthpieces originally made by Benge.

=== Teaching and Methods ===
As a teacher, Gordon considered his students athletes who needed physical exercise to stay in shape, and prescribed daily breathing exercises to develop their wind power. He was widely respected by his many students for his knowledge and friendliness.

Claude Gordon published six major books through Carl Fischer Music on brass instrument playing. His most comprehensive method book is Systematic Approach To Daily Practice, published in 1965. The book is formatted as a 52-week course with step-by-step instructions on how to practice Gordon's original routines alongside parts of Clarke's Technical Studies and Characteristic Studies, Lip Flexibility on the Trumpet by Walter M. Smith, Saint-Jacome's Grand Method for Trumpet or Cornet, Advanced Lip Flexibilities by Charles Colin, and the Arban method.

Gordon also published Daily Trumpet Routines in 1971, Physical Approach to Elementary Brass Playing in 1977, Tongue Level Exercises in 1981, Thirty Velocity Studies also in 1981. All of the previously mentioned books with the exception of Daily Trumpet Routines have editions for bass-clef brass instruments.

Gordon wrote his final book, Brass Playing is No Harder than Deep Breathing, for publication in 1987. It consolidates much of his teaching regarding tone generation in brass instruments as prose with minimal use of musical notation. Gordon also worked with Carl Fischer as an annotator for multiple editions of the Arban method, editor for Clarke's Technical Studies for Bass Clef Instruments, and revising editor for Saint-Jacome's Grand Method for Trumpet or Cornet.

=== Personal Papers ===
The Claude Gordon Personal Papers and Music Instrument Collection—including music, correspondence with Herbert L. Clarke and other notable trumpeters, educational materials, performance contracts, publicity materials and memorabilia—is housed at the Sousa Archives and Center for American Music at the University of Illinois at Urbana-Champaign.
