= Trumpet =

Brass instrument

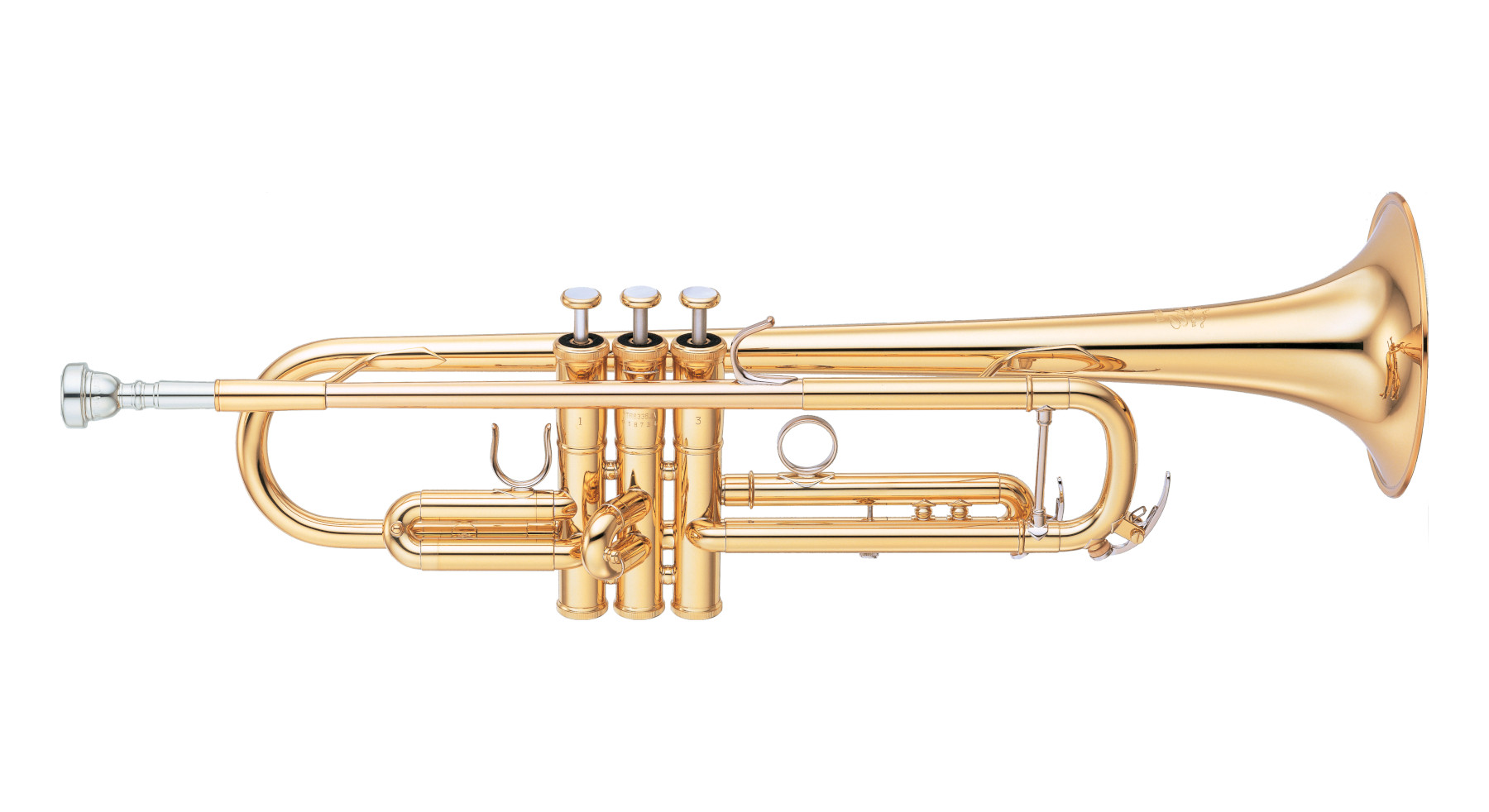
- Trumpet in B♭

Brass instrument
- Classification: Wind; Brass; Aerophone
- Hornbostel–Sachs classification: 423.233 (Valved aerophone sounded by lip vibration)

Playing range
- All trumpets have approximately the same written range. The sounding pitch depends on what key the instrument is in. Lower and higher notes are possible (see § Range).

Related instruments
- Flugelhorn; cornet; cornett; flumpet; bugle

Sound sample
- Sound of a trumpet – Warsaw Castle, Poland.

The trumpet is a brass instrument. The most common type of trumpet is a transposing instrument in B♭, with pitches sounding a whole step lower than written. The trumpet family includes instruments ranging from the piccolo trumpet, with the highest register in the brass family, to the bass trumpet, pitched one octave below the standard B♭ or C trumpet.

Trumpet-like instruments have historically been used as signaling devices in battle or hunting, with examples dating back to the 2nd Millennium BC. They began to be used as musical instruments only in the late 14th or early 15th century. Trumpets are used in art music styles, appearing in orchestras, concert bands, chamber music groups, and jazz ensembles. They are also common in popular music and are generally included in school bands. Sound is produced by vibrating the lips in a mouthpiece, which starts a standing wave in the air column of the instrument. Since the late 15th century, trumpets have primarily been constructed of brass tubing, usually bent twice into a rounded rectangular shape.

The most common trumpet is pitched in B♭, with a tubing length of about 1.48 m (4 ft 10 in). There are trumpets pitched in C, D, and E♭, as well as the piccolo trumpet in B♭ (an octave higher than the standard trumpet), and the bass trumpet (in B♭ an octave lower, or in C). The cornet is similar to the trumpet but has a conical bore (the trumpet has a cylindrical bore) and its tubing is generally wound differently. Early trumpets did not provide means to change the length of tubing, whereas modern instruments generally have three (or sometimes four) valves which are used to change their pitch. Most trumpets have piston valves, although some have rotary valves. The use of rotary-valved trumpets is more common in orchestral settings (especially in German and German-style orchestras), although this practice varies by country. A musician who plays the trumpet is called a trumpet player or trumpeter.

== Etymology ==
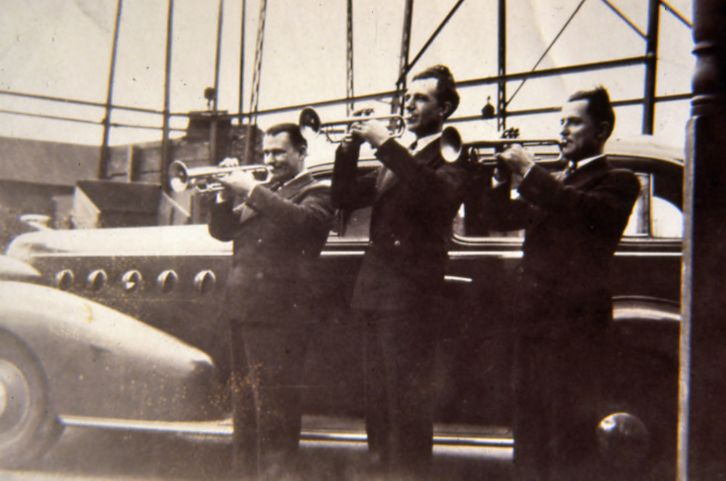
Trio of trumpeters in Toledo, Ohio, approximately 1940

The English word trumpet was first used in the late 14th century. The word came from Old French trompette, which is a diminutive of trompe. The word trump, meaning trumpet, was first used in English in 1300. The word comes from Old French trompe 'long, tube-like musical wind instrument' (c. 1100s), cognate with Provençal tromba, Italian tromba, all probably from a Germanic source (compare Old High German trumpa, Old Norse trumba 'trumpet'), of imitative origin."

== History ==
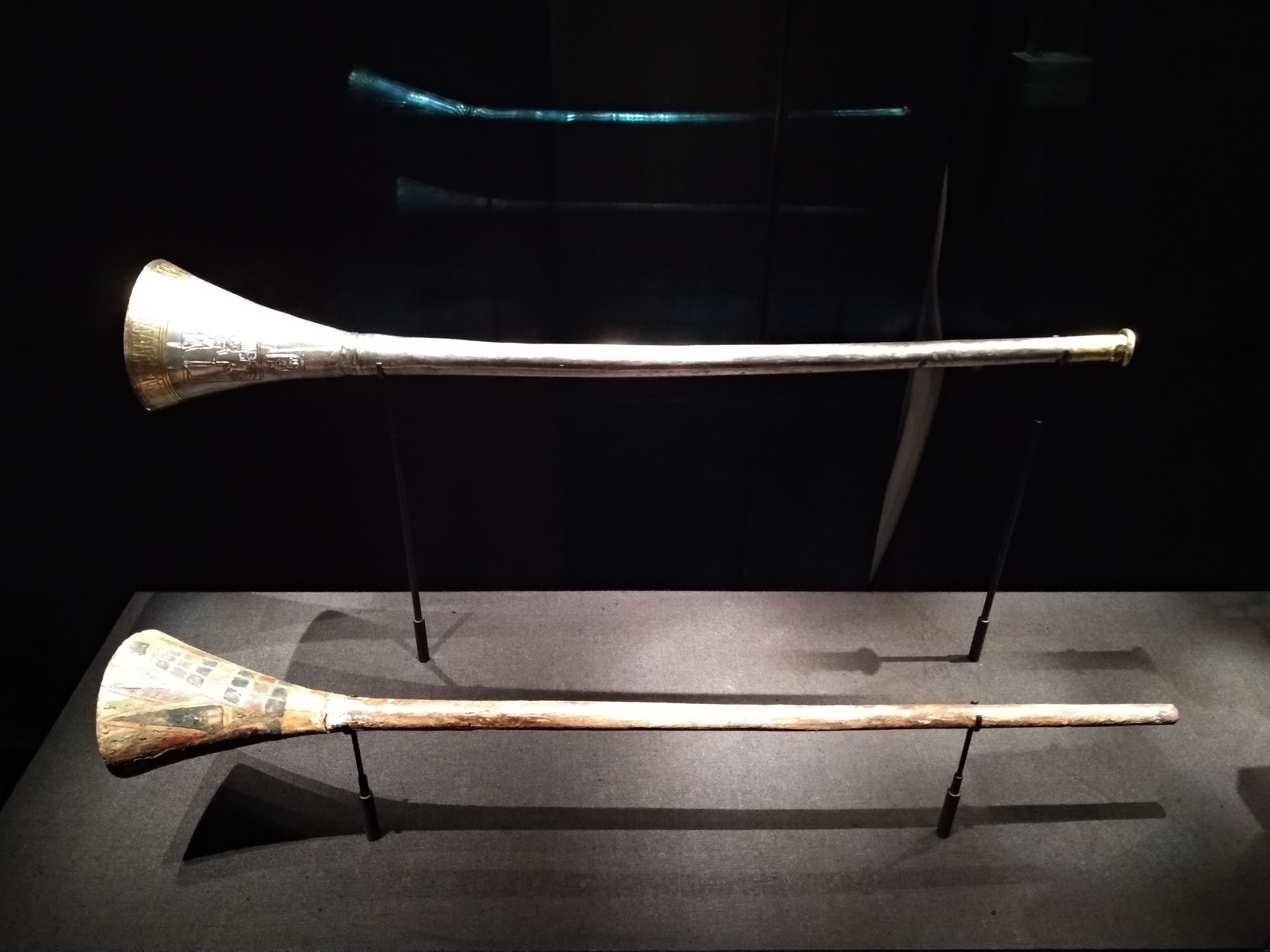
Silver and gold plated trumpet and its wooden mute from the tomb of Tutankhamun (1326–1336 BC)

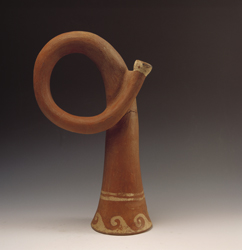
Ceramic trumpet, AD 300, Larco Museum Collection Lima, Peru

Trumpet, 17th century, decorated with large tassels

The earliest trumpets date back to 2000 BC and earlier, including Tutankhamun's bronze and silver trumpets from his grave in Egypt, bronze lurs from Scandinavia, and metal trumpets from China. The Oxus civilization in the 3rd millennium BC in Central Asia had trumpets with decorated swellings in the middle, made out of one sheet of metal, which is considered a technical wonder for its time.

The Salpinx was a straight trumpet 62 inches (1,600 mm) long, made of bone or bronze. Homer's Iliad (9th or 8th century BC) contains the earliest reference to its sound, and frequent descriptions are found throughout the Classical Period. Salpinx contests were a part of the original Olympic Games. The Shofar, made from a ram's horn, and the chazozra, made of metal, are both mentioned in the Bible. They were said to have been played in Solomon's Temple around 3,000 years ago, and are still used on certain religious days.

The Moche people of ancient Peru depicted trumpets in their art going back to AD 300. The earliest trumpets were signaling instruments used in military or religious contexts, rather than in music. The modern bugle continues this signaling tradition.

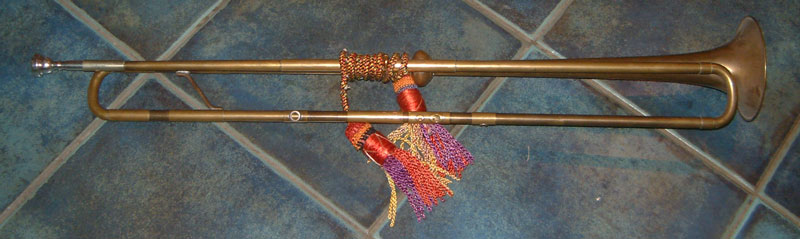
Reproduction baroque trumpet by Michael Laird

Improvements to instrument design and metal making in the late Middle Ages and Renaissance led to an increase in the trumpet's utility as a musical instrument. The natural trumpets of this era consisted of a coiled tube without valves which could only produce the notes of a single overtone series. Changing keys required the player to change crooks of the instrument. The development of the upper, "clarino" register by specialist trumpeters—notably Cesare Bendinelli—would lend itself well to music of the Baroque era. This was known as the "Golden Age of the natural trumpet," during which a vast body of music was written for virtuoso trumpeters. Interest in the natural trumpet was revived in the mid-20th century, and its use has become more common. Many modern players in Germany and the UK who perform Baroque music use a version of the natural trumpet fitted with three or four vent holes to aid in correcting out-of-tune notes in the harmonic series.

The melody-dominated homophony of the classical and romantic periods relegated the trumpet to a secondary role by most major composers owing to the limitations of the natural trumpet. Berlioz wrote in 1844:

Notwithstanding the real loftiness and distinguished nature of its quality of tone, there are few instruments that have been more degraded (than the trumpet). Down to Beethoven and Weber, every composer – not excepting Mozart – persisted in confining it to the unworthy function of filling up, or in causing it to sound two or three commonplace rhythmical formulae.

== Construction ==
Trumpet valve bypass (depressed)

Trumpets are generally constructed of brass tubing, bent twice into a rounded oblong shape. They may be made from other materials, including plastic. As with all brass instruments, sound is produced by blowing air through slightly separated lips, producing a "buzzing" sound into the mouthpiece and starting a standing wave vibration in the air column inside the trumpet. The player can select the pitch from a range of overtones or harmonics by changing the lip aperture and tension (known as the embouchure).

The mouthpiece has a circular rim, which provides an environment for the lips' vibration. Directly behind the rim is the cup, which channels the air into a much smaller opening (the back bore or shank) that tapers out slightly to match the diameter of the trumpet's lead pipe. The dimensions of these parts of the mouthpiece affect the timbre or quality of sound, the ease of playability, and player comfort. Generally, the wider and deeper the cup, the darker the sound and timbre.

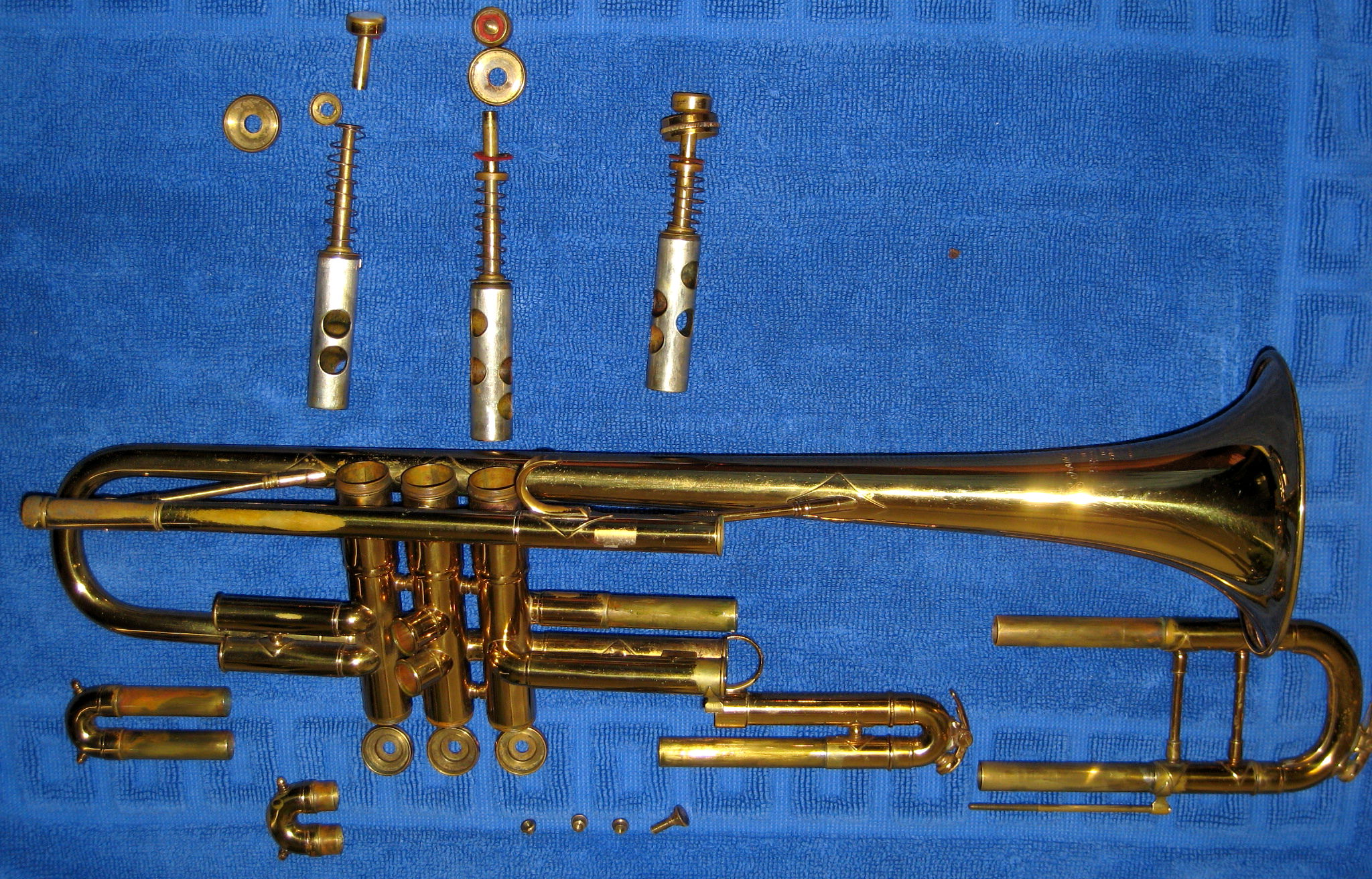
B♭ trumpet, disassembled

Modern trumpets have three (or, infrequently, four) valves, each of which increases the length of tubing when engaged, thereby lowering the pitch. Most trumpets use piston valves but some use rotary valves. The first valve lowers the instrument's pitch by a whole step (two semitones), the second valve by a half step (one semitone), and the third valve by one and a half steps (three semitones). These three valves provide eight possible valve combinations (including "none"), but only seven different tubing lengths, because the third valve alone gives the same tubing length as the 1–2 combination (there is often a deliberate difference between "1–2" and "3", allowing the player to select whichever gives the best tuning for any particular note). Used singly and in combination these valves make the instrument fully chromatic, i.e., able to play all twelve pitches. When a fourth valve is present, as on some piccolo trumpets, it usually lowers the pitch a perfect fourth (five semitones).

The overall pitch of the trumpet can be raised or lowered by the use of the tuning slide. Pulling the slide out lowers the pitch; pushing the slide in raises it. Pitch can be "bent" by adjusting the embouchure.

Renold Schilke designed a tuning-bell trumpet to reduce intonation problems. Removing the usual brace between the bell and a valve body allows a slide to be placed in the bell section for tuning. The regular tuning slide can remain completely, or nearly, pushed in, improving intonation and overall response.

A trumpet becomes a closed tube when the player presses it to the lips; therefore, the instrument only naturally produces every other overtone of the harmonic series. The shape of the bell makes the missing overtones audible. Most notes are slightly out of tune and modern trumpets have slide mechanisms for the first and third valves with which the player can compensate by extending one or both slides, using the left thumb and ring finger for the first and third valve slides respectively.

== Types ==
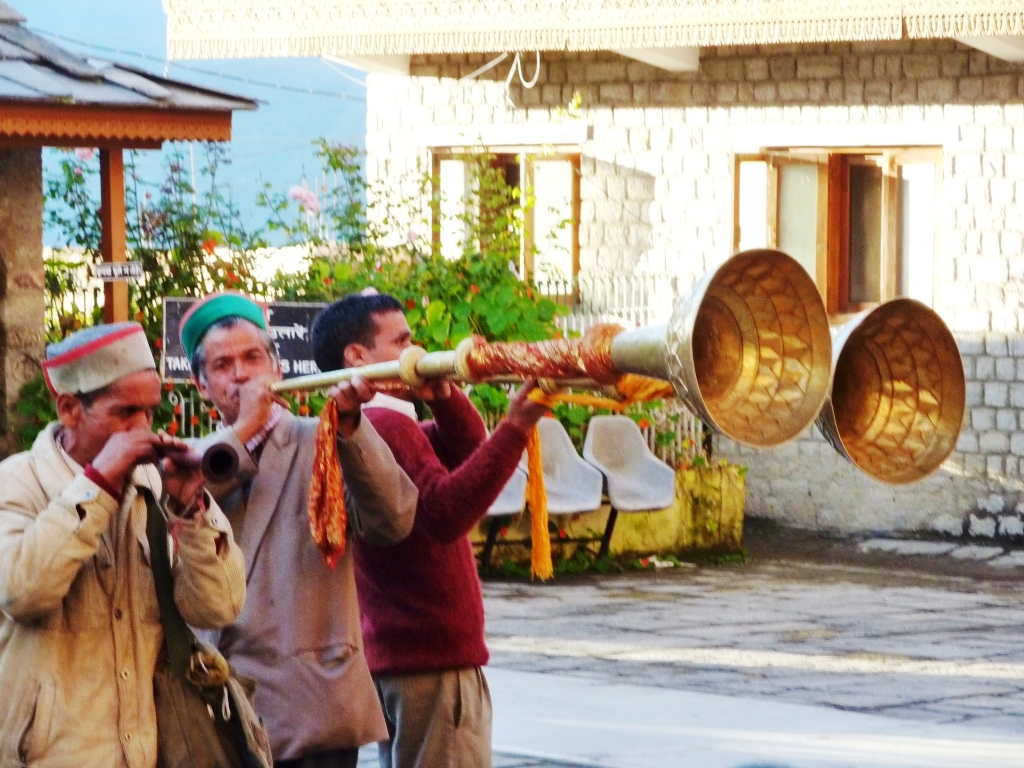
Trumpeters, Royal Palace, Sarahan, Himachal Pradesh, India

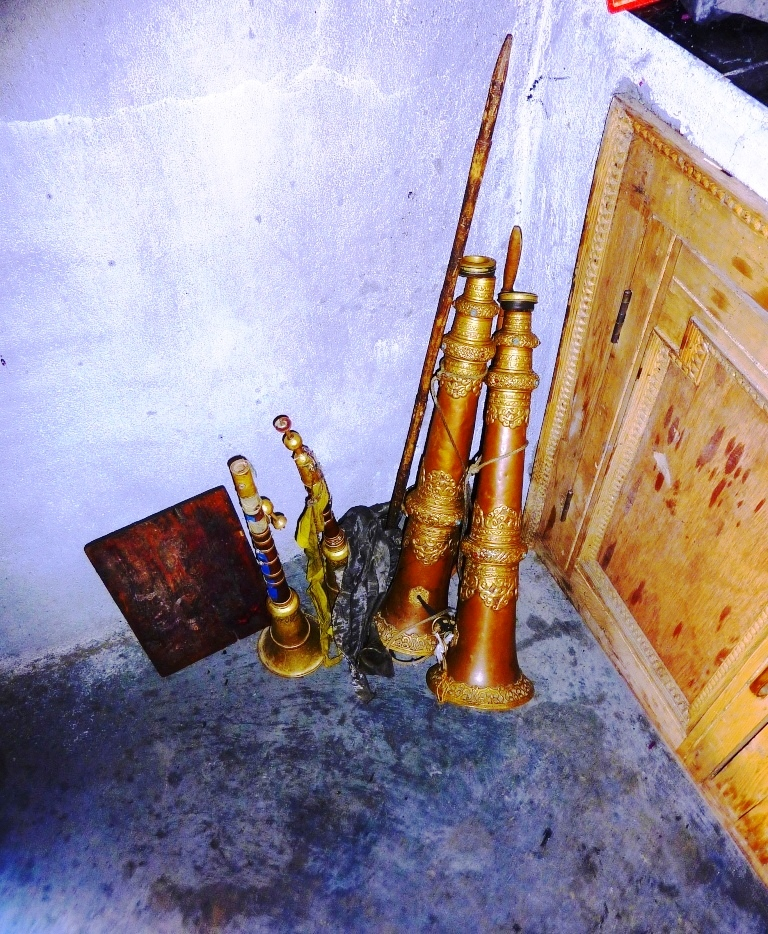
Tibetan trumpets stored at Tagthok Monastery, Ladakh

The most common type is the B♭ trumpet, a transposing instrument that sounds a whole step lower than written. Trumpets in C are non-transposing instruments sounding at concert pitch, commonly used in American orchestral playing alongside the B♭ trumpet. There is classical literature for trumpet in D, E♭, and for piccolo trumpet (in B♭ or A, an octave above the standard B♭ instrument), and trumpets in A, E, low F, and G also exist. Bass trumpets, pitched an octave lower than the standard B♭ or C instrument, have a mouthpiece similar to that of a trombone, and are usually played by trombonists. Orchestral trumpet players learn to transpose music at sight and generally use the more common B♭ or C trumpet to play music written for D or E♭ trumpet, or for the rare A, E, F, B, C♯, F♯ or G instruments.

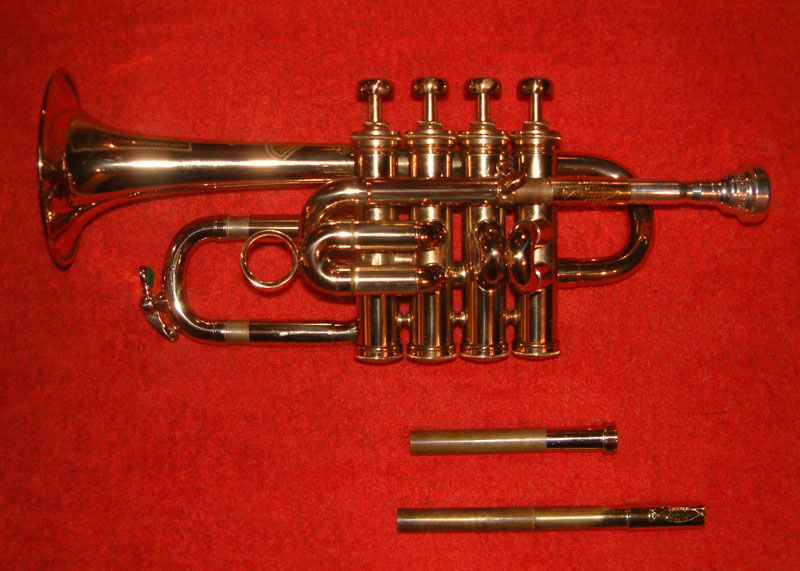
Selmer piccolo trumpet in B♭, with swappable leadpipes to tune the instrument to B♭ (shorter) or A (longer)

Piccolo trumpets are generally built to play in both B♭ and A, with separate leadpipes for each key. The tubing in the B♭ piccolo trumpet is one-half the length of that in a standard B♭ trumpet, making it sound an octave higher. Piccolo trumpets in G, F, and C are also manufactured, but are less common. Almost all piccolo trumpets have four valves instead of three—the fourth valve usually lowers the pitch by a fourth, making some lower notes accessible and creating alternate fingerings for certain trills. Maurice André, Håkan Hardenberger, David Mason, and Wynton Marsalis are some well-known trumpet players known for their virtuosity on the piccolo trumpet.

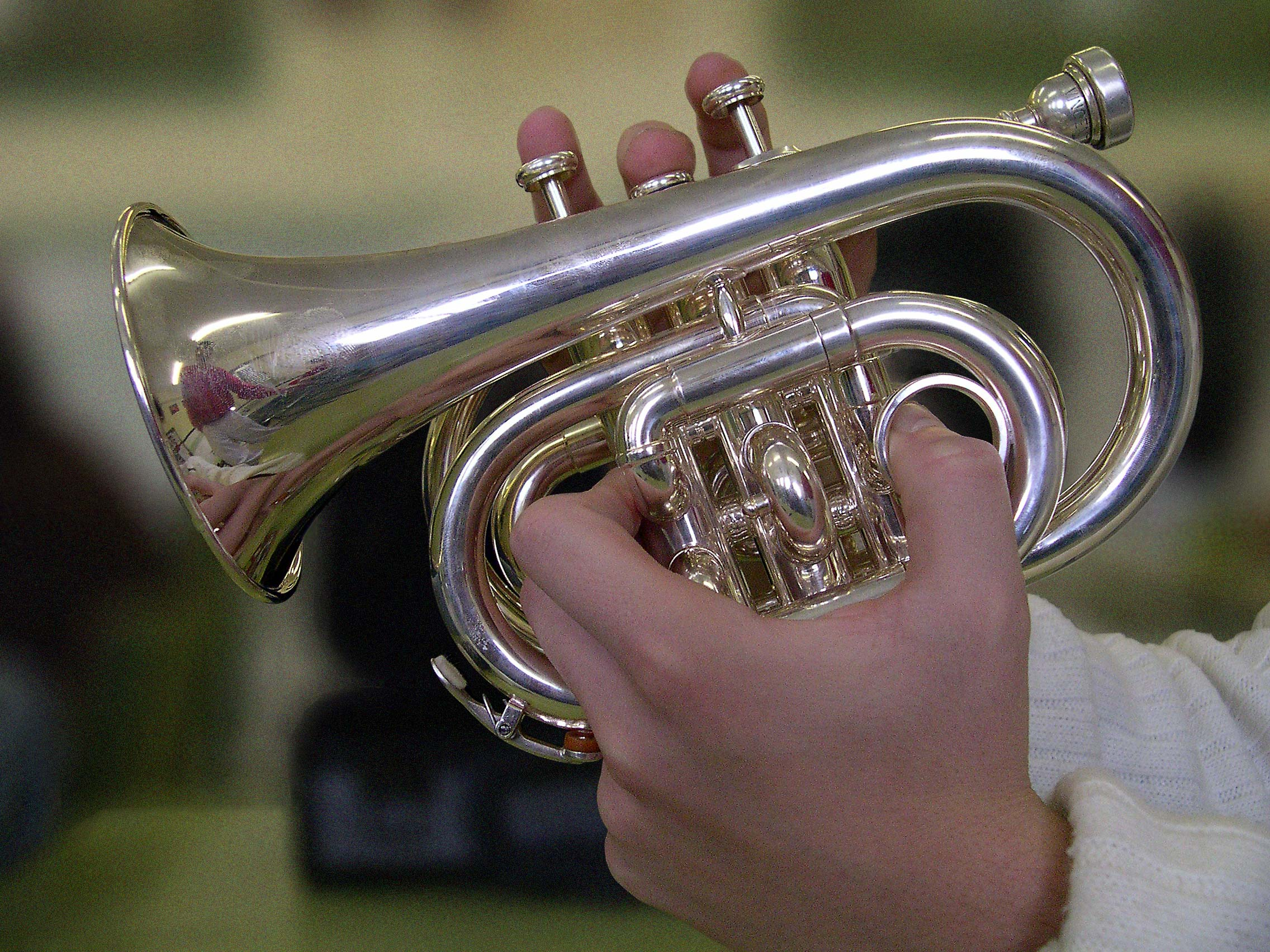
Pocket trumpet

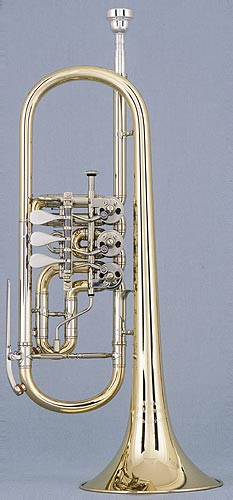
Trumpet in C with rotary valves

Trumpets pitched in the key of low G are also called sopranos, or soprano bugles, after their adaptation from military bugles. Traditionally used in drum and bugle corps, sopranos employ either rotary valves or piston valves. Trumpets in low F were common in the nineteenth century, composed for by Richard Wagner, Franz Liszt, and Anton Bruckner, among others. These parts are in the upper register (unlike parts for alto trumpet, which are intended for the lower register) and are typically played on the B♭ or C trumpets today.

The bass trumpet is at the same pitch as a trombone and is usually played by a trombone player, although its music is written in treble clef. Most bass trumpets are pitched in either C or B♭. The C bass trumpet sounds an octave lower than written, and the B♭ bass sounds a major ninth (B♭) lower, making them both transposing instruments.

The historical slide trumpet was probably first developed in the late 14th century for use in alta cappella wind bands. Deriving from early straight trumpets, the Renaissance slide trumpet was essentially a natural trumpet with a sliding leadpipe. This single slide was awkward, as the entire instrument moved, and the range of the slide was probably no more than a major third. Originals were probably pitched in D, to fit with shawms in D and G, probably at a typical pitch standard near A=466 Hz. No known instruments from this period survive, so the details—and even the existence—of a Renaissance slide trumpet is a matter of debate among scholars. While there is documentation (written and artistic) of its existence, there is also conjecture that its slide would have been impractical. Some slide trumpet designs saw use in England in the 18th century.

The pocket trumpet is a compact B♭ trumpet. The bell is usually smaller than a standard trumpet bell, and the tubing is more tightly wound to reduce the instrument's size without reducing the total tube length. Its design is not standardized, and the quality of various models varies greatly. It can have a unique warm sound and voice-like articulation. Since many pocket trumpet models suffer from poor design as well as poor manufacturing, the intonation, tone color, and dynamic range of such instruments are severely hindered. Professional-standard instruments are, however, available. While they are not a substitute for the full-sized instrument, they can be useful in certain contexts. The jazz musician Don Cherry was renowned for his playing of the pocket instrument.

The tubing of the bell section of a herald trumpet is straight, making it long enough to accommodate a hanging banner. This instrument is mostly used for ceremonial events such as parades and fanfares.

David Monette designed the flumpet in 1989 for jazz musician Art Farmer. It is a hybrid of a trumpet and a flugelhorn, pitched in B♭ and using three piston valves.

Rotary valve, or German, trumpets are commonly used in professional German and Austrian orchestras. Other variations include alto and Baroque trumpets, and the Vienna valve trumpet (primarily used in Viennese brass ensembles and orchestras such as the Vienna Philharmonic and Mnozil Brass).

The modern cornet is very similar to the modern trumpet. Both are pitched in B♭, have the same three-valve configuration, and use very similar mouthpieces. Music written for one of them is playable on the other. The cornet has more conical tubing, with more curved sections, while the trumpet has a more cylindrical tube with fewer bends. These design differences give the cornet a slightly mellower tone. The flugelhorn has tubing that is even more conical than that of the cornet, and an even mellower tone. It is also pitched in B♭ and has the same valve configuration as the other two, but uses a slightly different mouthpiece design.

== Playing ==
=== Fingering ===
On any modern trumpet, cornet, or flugelhorn, pressing the valves indicated by the numbers below produces the written notes shown. "Open" means all valves up, "1" means first valve, "1–2" means first and second valve simultaneously, and so on. The sounding pitch depends on the transposition of the instrument. Engaging the fourth valve, if present, usually drops any of these pitches by a perfect fourth as well. Within each overtone series, the different pitches are attained by changing the embouchure.

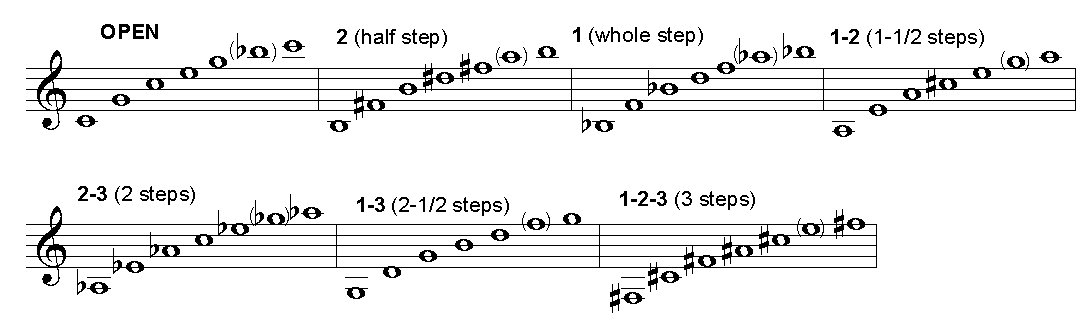
A step = a tone; a half step = a semitone

Each overtone series on the trumpet begins with the first overtone—the fundamental of each overtone series cannot be produced except as a pedal tone. Notes in parentheses are the sixth overtone, representing a pitch with a frequency of seven times that of the fundamental; while this pitch is close to the note shown, it is flat relative to equal temperament, and use of those fingerings is generally avoided.

The fingering schema arises from the length of each valve's tubing (a longer tube produces a lower pitch). Valve "1" increases the tubing length enough to lower the pitch by one whole step, valve "2" by one half step, and valve "3" by one and a half steps. This scheme and the nature of the overtone series create the possibility of alternate fingerings for certain notes. For example, third-space "C" can be produced with no valves engaged (standard fingering) or with valves 2–3. Also, any note produced with 1–2 as its standard fingering can also be produced with valve 3 – each drops the pitch by 1 1/2 steps. Alternate fingerings may be used to improve facility in certain passages or to aid in intonation. Extending the third valve slide when using the fingerings 1–3 or 1-2-3 further lowers the pitch slightly to improve intonation.

Some of the partials of the harmonic series that a modern B♭ trumpet can play for each combination of valves pressed are in tune with 12-tone equal temperament and some are not.

== Mutes ==
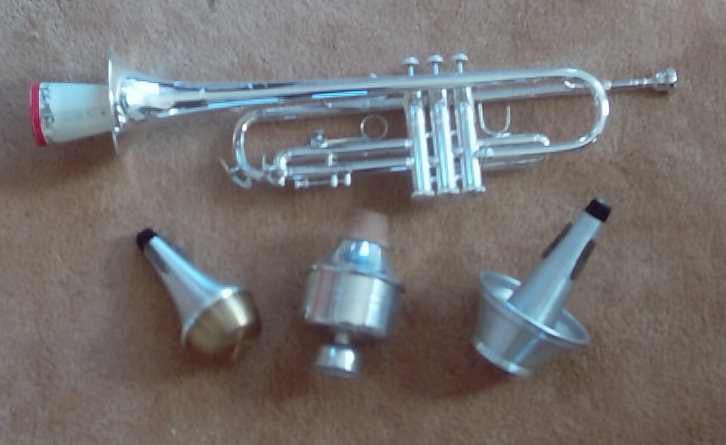
Trumpet with a straight mute inserted. Below, left to right: straight, wah-wah (harmon), and cup mutes.

Various types of mutes can be placed in or over the bell, which decreases volume and changes timbre. Trumpets have a wide selection of mutes: common ones include the straight mute, cup mute, harmon mute (wah-wah or wow-wow mute, among other names), plunger, bucket mute, and practice mute. A straight mute is generally used when the type of mute is not specified. Jazz and commercial music call for a wider range of mutes than most classical music and many mutes were invented for jazz orchestrators.

Mutes can be made of many materials, including fiberglass, plastic, cardboard, metal, and "stone lining", a trade name of the Humes & Berg company. They are often held in place with cork. To better keep the mute in place, players sometimes dampen the cork by blowing warm, moist air on it.

The straight mute is conical and constructed of either metal (usually aluminum)—which produces a bright, piercing sound—or another material, which produces a darker, stuffier sound. The cup mute is shaped like a straight mute with an additional, bell-facing cup at the end, and produces a darker tone than a straight mute. The harmon mute is made of metal (usually aluminum or copper) and consists of a "stem" inserted into a large chamber. The stem can be extended or removed to produce different timbres, and waving one's hand in front of the mute produces a "wah-wah" sound, hence the mute's colloquial name.

== Range ==
The standard trumpet range extends from the F♯ below middle C (F♯_{3}) to the high C (C_{6}) two octaves above middle C. It is possible to play higher notes on the instrument. Many trumpeters are famous for proficiency in the extreme high register, such as Maynard Ferguson, Cat Anderson, Dizzy Gillespie, Doc Severinsen, John Madrid, Wayne Bergeron, Louis Dowdeswell, Thomas Gansch, James Morrison, Jon Faddis, and Arturo Sandoval. It is also possible to produce pedal tones below the low F♯, which is a device occasionally employed in the contemporary repertoire for the instrument.

== Extended technique ==
Contemporary music for the trumpet makes wide use of extended trumpet techniques.

Flutter tonguing: The trumpeter rolls the tip of the tongue (as if rolling an "R" in Spanish) to produce a 'growling-like' tone. This technique is widely employed by composers like Berio and Stockhausen.

Growling: Simultaneously playing a tone and using the back of the tongue to vibrate the uvula, creating a distinct sound. Most trumpet players will use a plunger with this technique to achieve a particular sound heard in a lot of Chicago Jazz of the 1950s.

Double tonguing: The player articulates using the syllables ta-ka ta-ka ta-ka.

Triple tonguing: The same as double tonguing, but with the syllables ta-ta-ka ta-ta-ka ta-ta-ka.

Doodle tongue: The trumpeter tongues as if saying the word doodle. This is a very faint tonguing, similar in sound to a valve tremolo.

Glissando: Trumpeters can slide between notes by depressing the valves halfway and changing the lip tension. Modern repertoire makes extensive use of this technique.

Vibrato: It is often regulated in contemporary repertoire through specific notation. Composers can call for everything from fast, slow or no vibrato to actual rhythmic patterns played with vibrato.

Pedal tone: Composers have written notes as low as two-and-a-half octaves below the low F♯ at the bottom of the standard range. Extreme low pedals are produced by slipping the lower lip out of the mouthpiece. Claude Gordon assigned pedals as part of his trumpet practice routines, which were a systematic expansion on his lessons with Herbert L. Clarke. The technique was pioneered by Bohumir Kryl.

Microtones: Composers such as Scelsi and Stockhausen have made wide use of the trumpet's ability to play microtonally. Some instruments feature a fourth valve that provides a quarter-tone step between each note. The jazz musician Ibrahim Maalouf uses such a trumpet, invented by his father to make it possible to play Arab maqams.

Valve tremolo: Many notes on the trumpet can be played in several different valve combinations. By alternating between valve combinations on the same note, a tremolo effect can be created. Berio makes extended use of this technique in his Sequenza X.

Noises: By hissing, clicking, or breathing through the instrument, the trumpet can be made to resonate in ways that do not sound at all like a trumpet. Noises may require amplification.

Preparation: Composers have called for trumpeters to play underwater, or with certain slides removed. It is increasingly common for composers to specify all sorts of preparations for the trumpet. Extreme preparations involve alternate constructions, such as double bells and extra valves.

Split tone: Trumpeters can produce more than one tone simultaneously by vibrating the two lips at different speeds. The interval produced is usually an octave or a fifth.

Lip-trill or shake: Also known as "lip-slurs". By rapidly varying air speed, but not changing the depressed valves, the pitch can vary quickly between adjacent harmonic partials. Shakes and lip-trills can vary in speed and in the distance between the partials. However, lip-trills and shakes usually involve the next partial up from the written note.

Multi-phonics: Playing a note and "humming" a different note simultaneously. For example, sustaining a middle C and humming a major 3rd "E" at the same time.

Circular breathing: A technique wind players use to produce uninterrupted tone, without pauses for breaths. The player puffs up the cheeks, storing air, then breathes in rapidly through the nose while using the cheeks to continue pushing air outwards.

=== Instruction and method books ===
One trumpet method is Jean-Baptiste Arban's Complete Conservatory Method for Trumpet (Cornet). Other well-known method books include Technical Studies by Herbert L. Clarke, Grand Method by Louis Saint-Jacome, Daily Drills and Technical Studies by Max Schlossberg, and methods by Ernest S. Williams, Claude Gordon, Charles Colin, James Stamp, and Louis Davidson. A common method book for beginners is the Walter Beeler's Method for the Cornet, and there have been several instruction books written by virtuoso Allen Vizzutti. Merri Franquin wrote a Complete Method for Modern Trumpet, which fell into obscurity for much of the twentieth century until public endorsements by Maurice André revived interest in this work.

== Players ==
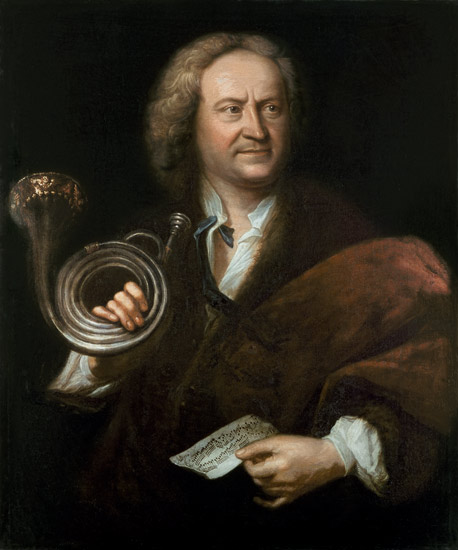
Gottfried Reiche, chief trumpeter for Johann Sebastian Bach in Leipzig

In early jazz, Louis Armstrong was well known for his virtuosity and his improvisations on the Hot Five and Hot Seven recordings, and his switch from cornet to trumpet is often cited as heralding the trumpet's dominance over the cornet in jazz. Dizzy Gillespie was a gifted improviser with an extremely high (but musical) range, building on the style of Roy Eldridge but adding new layers of harmonic complexity. Gillespie had an enormous impact on virtually every subsequent trumpeter, both by the example of his playing and as a mentor to younger musicians. Miles Davis is widely considered one of the most influential musicians of the 20th century—his style was distinctive and widely imitated. Davis' phrasing and sense of space in his solos have been models for generations of jazz musicians. Cat Anderson was a trumpet player who was known for the ability to play extremely high with an even more extreme volume, who played with Duke Ellington's Big Band. Maynard Ferguson came to prominence playing in Stan Kenton's orchestra, before forming his own band in 1957. He was noted for being able to play accurately in a remarkably high register.

== Repertoire ==
The trumpet repertoire consists of solo literature and orchestral or, more commonly, band parts written for the trumpet. Tracings its origins to 1500 BC, the trumpet is a musical instrument with the highest register in the brass family.

=== Solos ===
In the 1790s Anton Weidinger developed the first successful keyed trumpet, capable of playing chromatically. Joseph Haydn's Trumpet Concerto was written for him in 1796 and startled contemporary audiences by its novelty, a fact shown off by some stepwise melodies played low in the instrument's range.

== In art ==
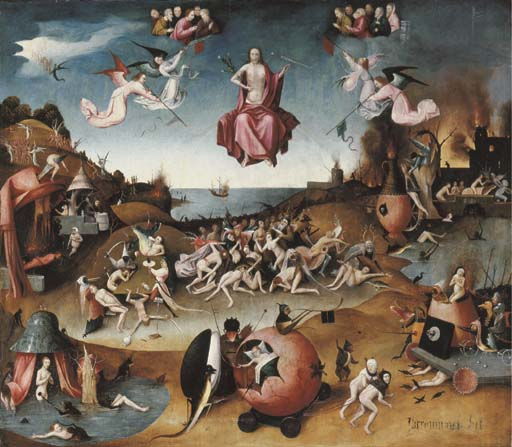
The Last Judgment (Bosch, Bruges), c. 1500–1510

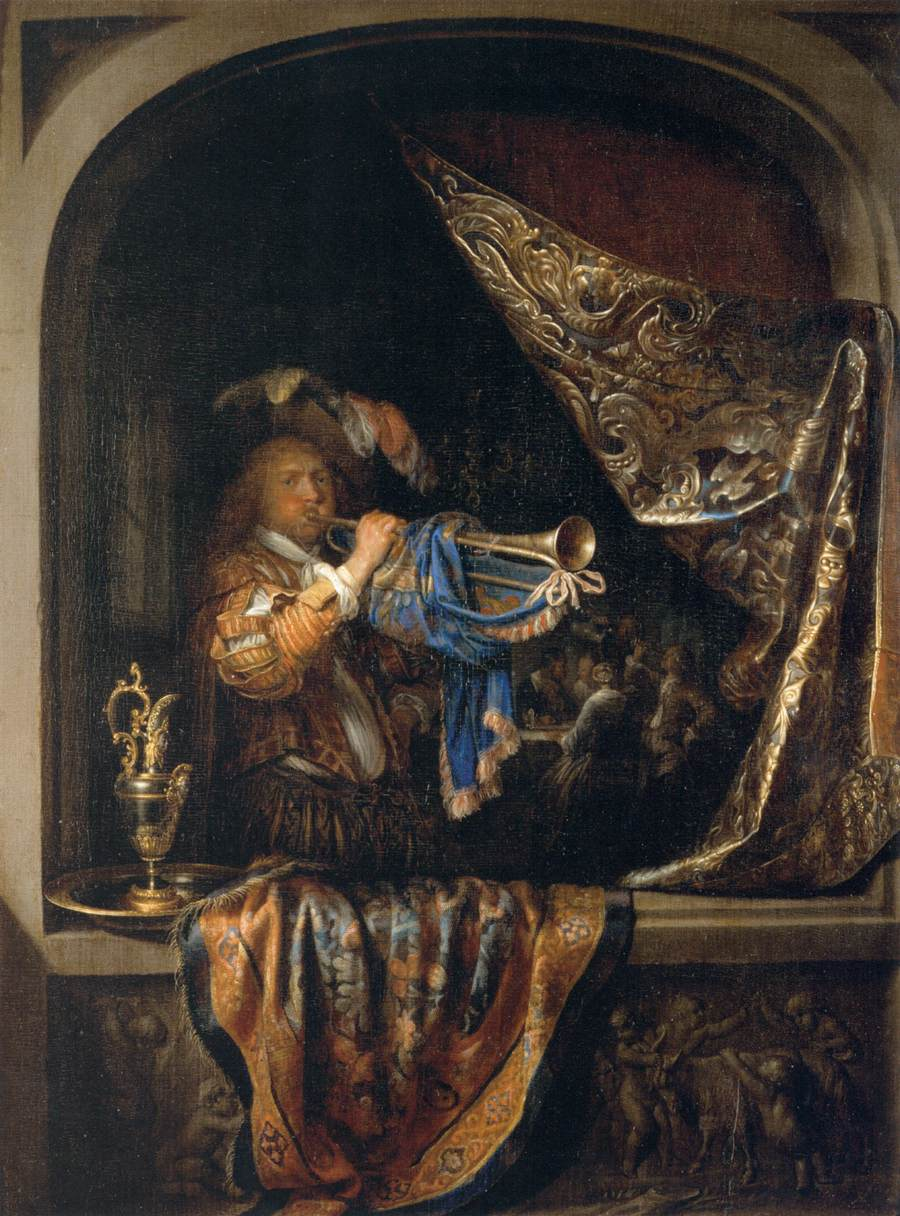
Trumpet-Player in front of a Banquet, Gerrit Dou, c. 1660–1665

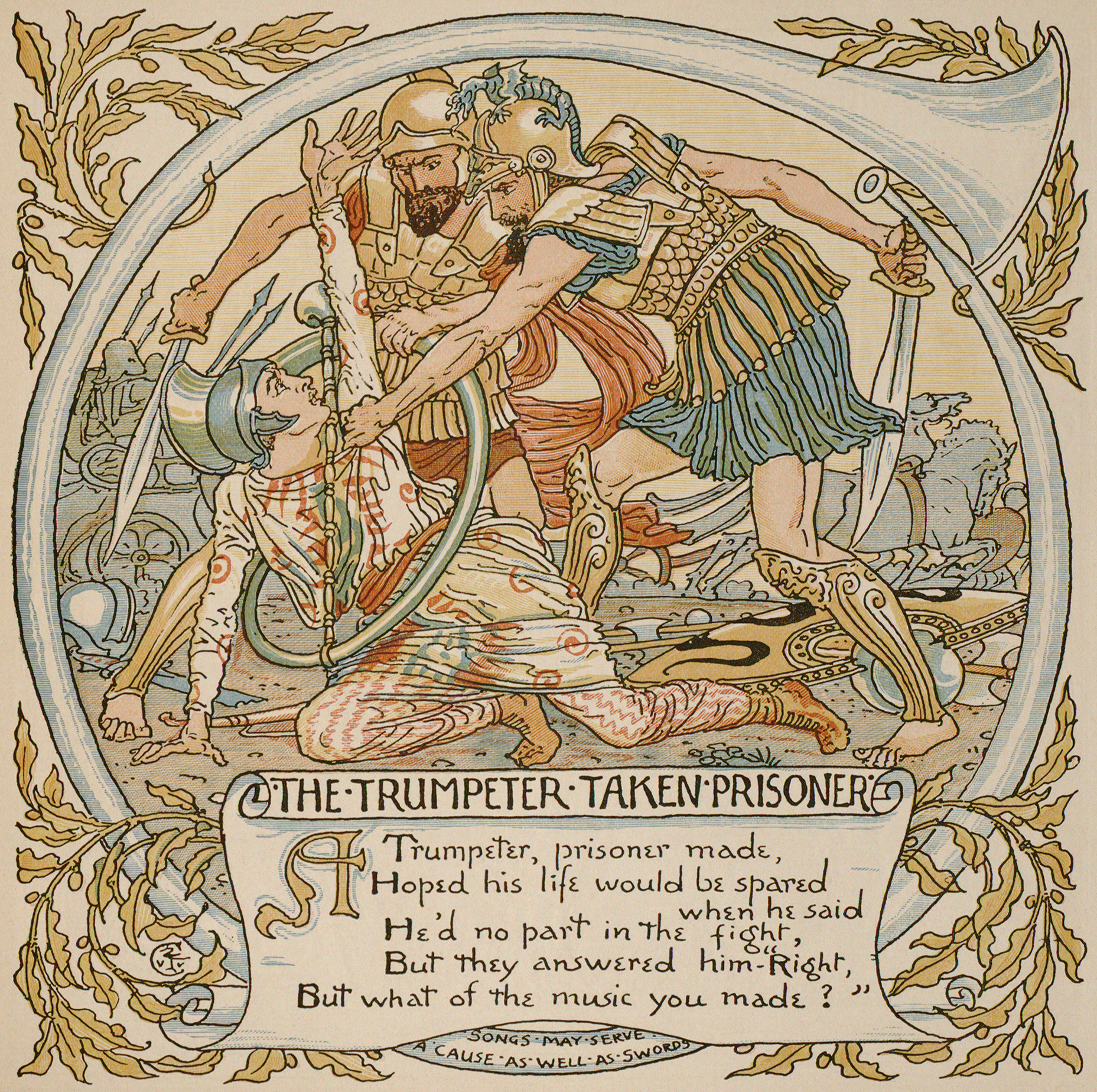
Illustration for The Trumpeter Taken Prisoner from an 1887 children's edition of Aesop's Fables

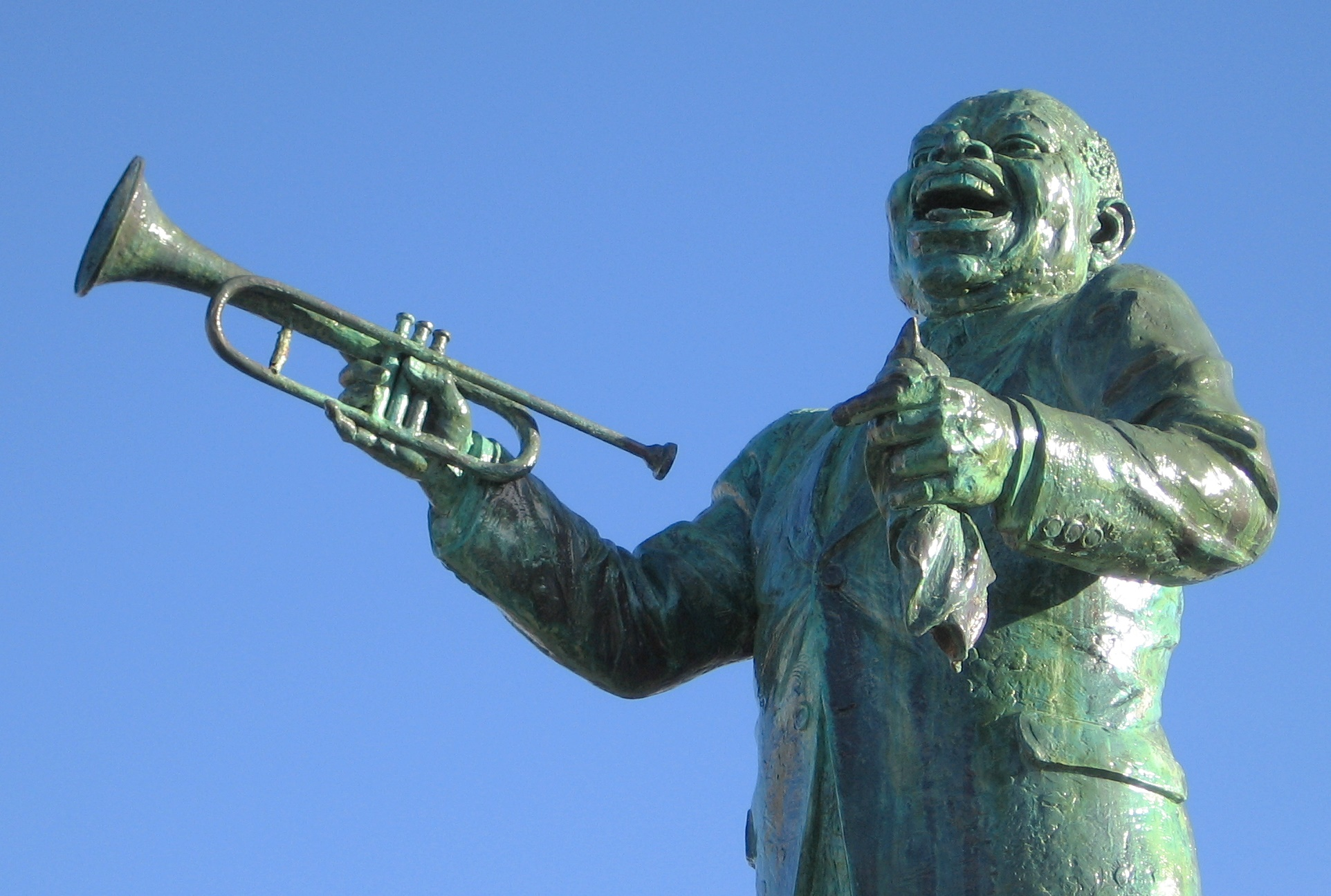
Louis Armstrong statue in Algiers, New Orleans

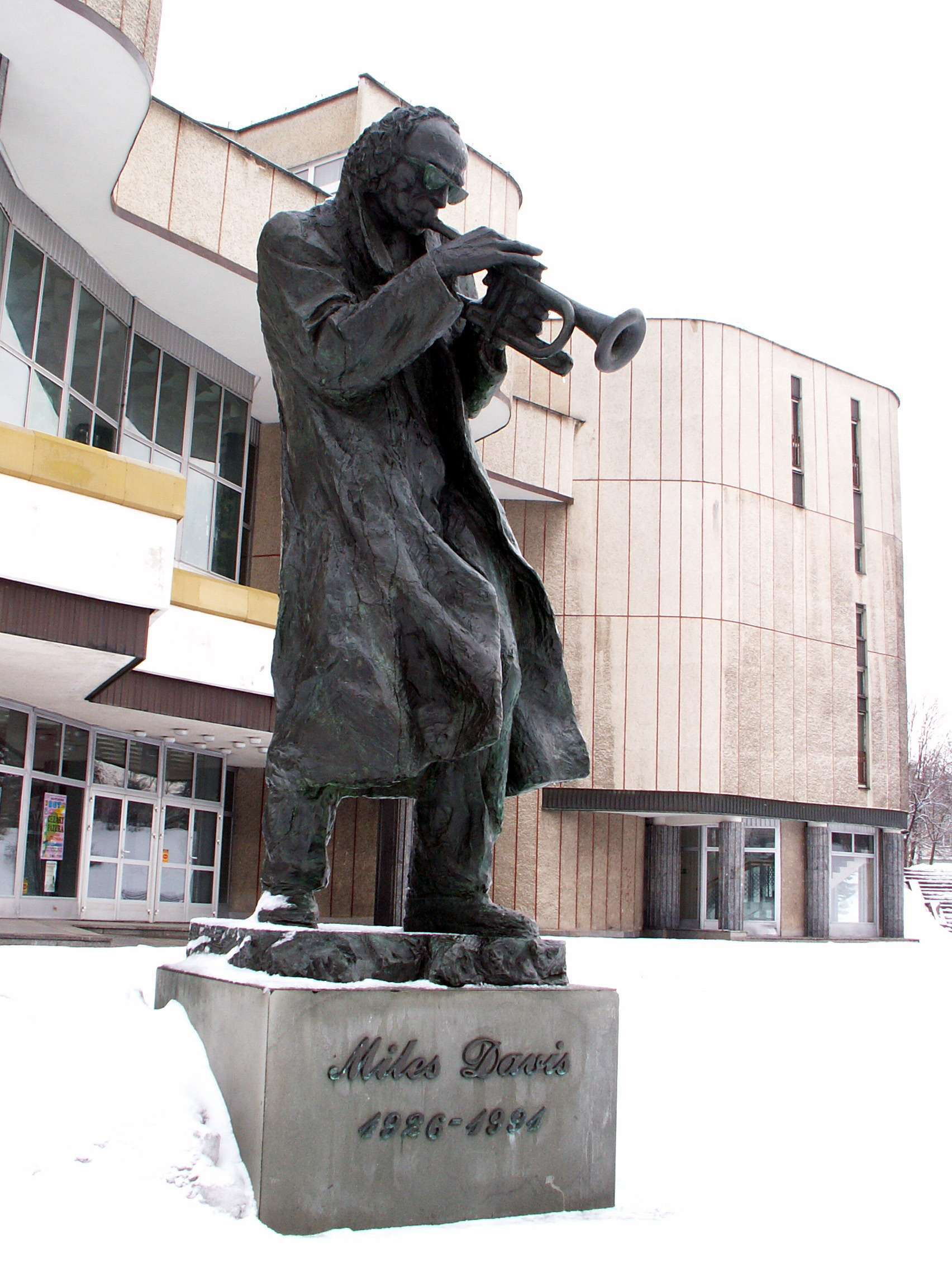
Miles Davis statue in Kielce, Poland

== See also ==
- Herald and Trumpet contest
- Compositions for trumpet
- Birch trumpet
- Muted trumpet
- Wind controller
