= The American Band =

Community band in Providence, Rhode Island

- symphonic concert band
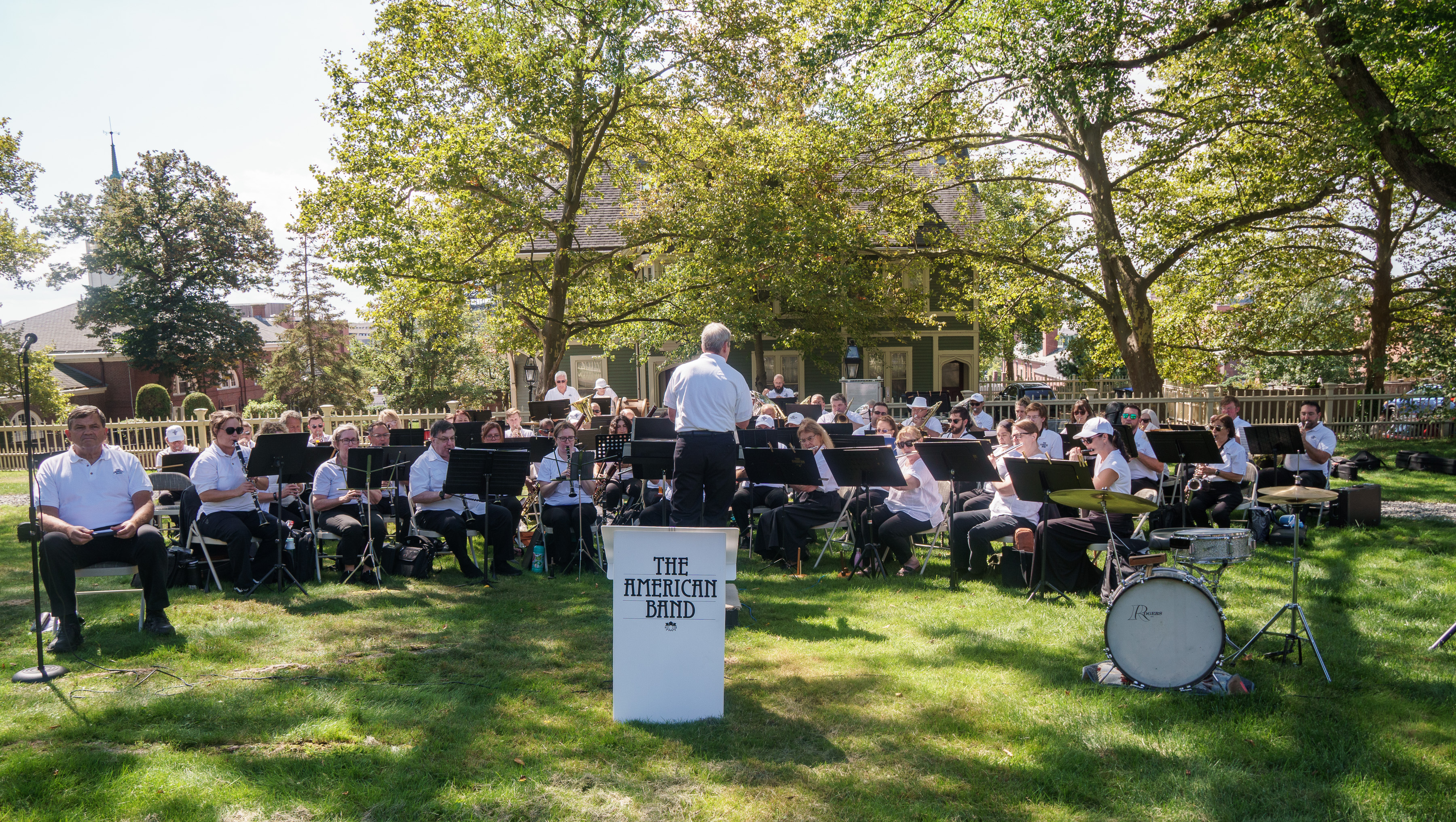
- Outdoor performance at the John Brown House in 2025
- Founded: 1837
- Location: Providence, Rhode Island, U.S.
- Principal conductor: Brian Cardany
- Website: theamericanband.org

The American Band is a community band based in Providence, Rhode Island. It was founded as a military band in 1837 by Joseph C. Greene. During its early years, the members were the highest paid in the country – even higher than the New York Philharmonic in its first season. Since its founding, the band has performed near-continuously until the present day, and is one of the oldest bands in the country still performing. Many of the members are music educators, and others are involved in other careers.

== History ==
Reeves and Church

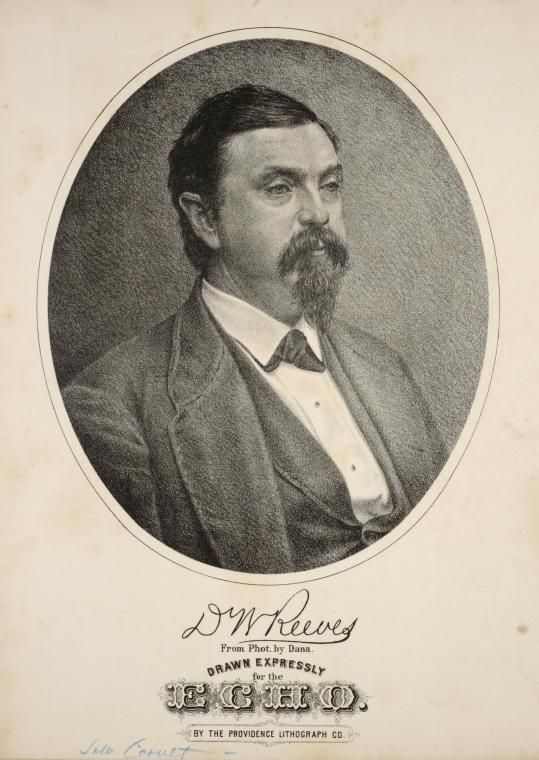
Bandleader D.W. Reeves

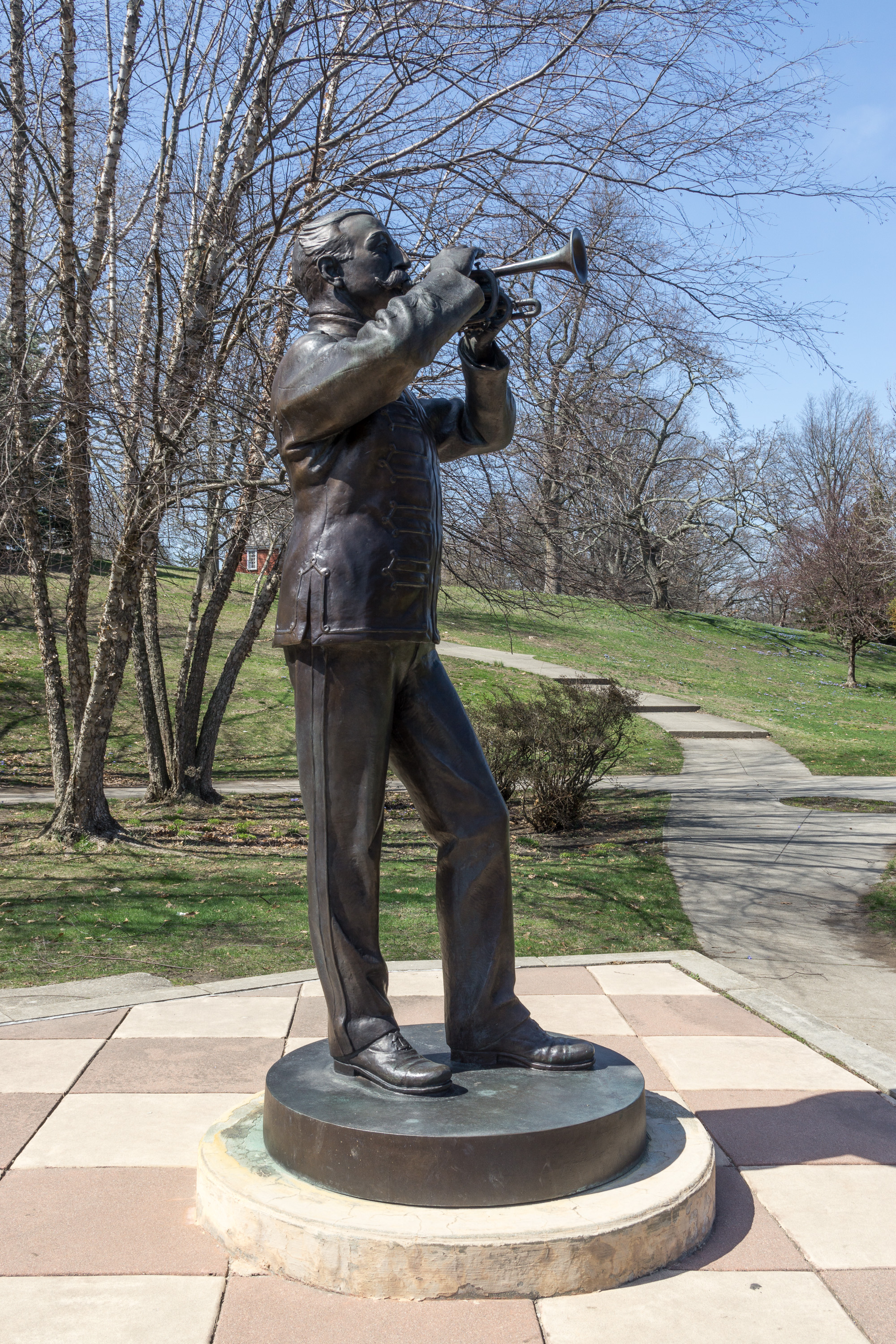
Statue of cornetist Bowen R. Church in Roger Williams Park

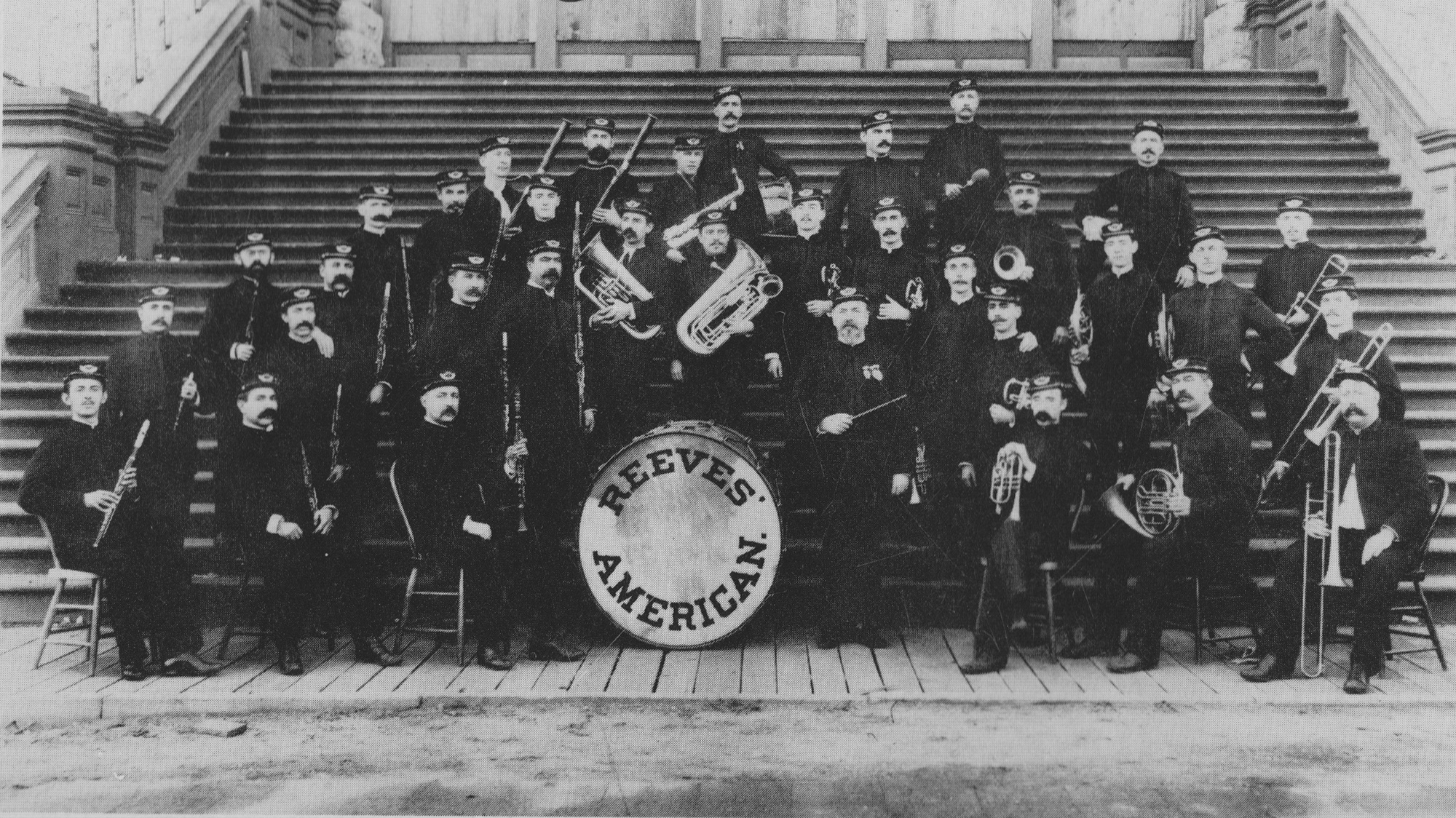
undated photo ca. 1800s

The band was incorporated in 1837 as the American Brass Band, a 15-piece ensemble of brass instruments and drums, by bugle soloist Joseph C. Greene.

=== The D.W. Reeves years ===
The band was directed by noted march composer D. W. Reeves, one of America's foremost conductors, from 1866 until his death in 1900. In the years following the American Civil War, Reeves grew the ensemble into a professional organization, performing on tours across the United States. Reeves added flutes, clarinets, oboes, bassoons and the recently invented saxophones to the band's repertoire.

=== Bowen R. Church ===
Valley Falls native Bowen R. Church (1860–1923) was a master cornet soloist. Reeves invited Church, then a young musical prodigy, to join the band after an impromptu audition on a train, and thereafter became his mentor. Church eventually became a headliner of the band, and briefly led the band after Reeves' death in 1900.

=== Warren Fales ===
A 1914 advertisement listed Warren R. Fales as the director of the band, and noted that band members "are exempt from Jury Duty." The ad noted that the band had performed at Brown University's commencement "every year for the past 50 years."

=== Decline and revival ===
Following Reeves' death in 1900, the band became more of a local community group playing local concerts and parades. By the 1970s, facing dwindling membership, the band eventually ceased performing entirely, until it was revived by Dr. Francis Marciniak in 1978. Marciniak led the band until 1996.

In the 21st century, the band has been recognized as one of the best symphonic bands in southeast New England, and was inducted into the Rhode Island Music Hall of Fame in 2020.

== Notable performances ==
- The band "saw action" at the Battle of Bull Run and served as stretcher-bearers for the wounded.
- The American Band performed at all Brown University graduations between "at least 1847" and 1970, when the Brown University Band took over the role.
- The band entertained veterans at the annual reunions of the Grand Army of the Republic Civil War veterans at Rocky Point
- The band regularly performed at Providence's Roger Williams Park, where a memorial to Reeves and another to Church were later erected
