= David Wallis Reeves =

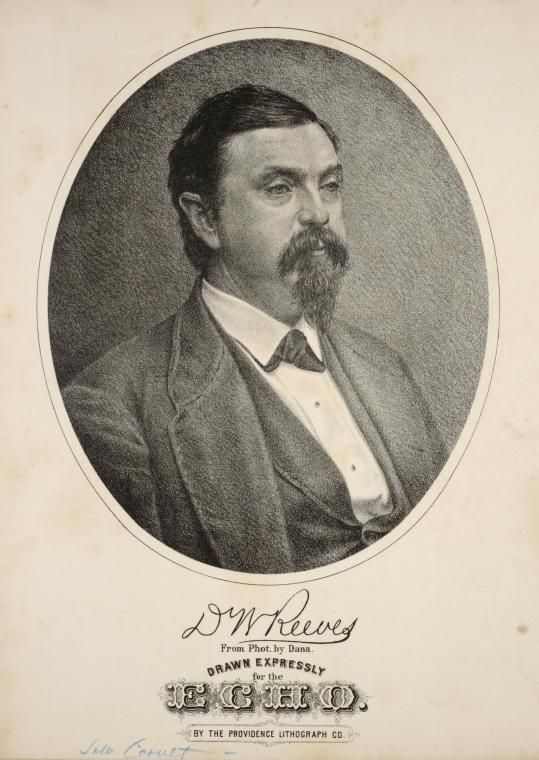

Background information
- Born: February 14, 1838; Oswego, New York, U.S.
- Died: March 8, 1900 (aged 62) Providence, Rhode Island, U.S.
- Occupations: Composer, cornetist, and bandleader
- Instrument: Cornet
- Years active: circa 1850–1900
- Formerly of: The American Band

D.W. Reeves

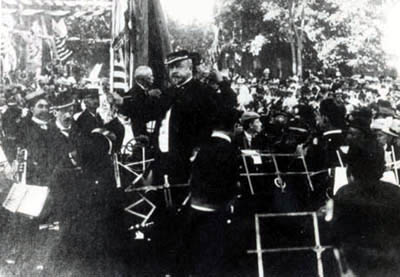
Reeves conducting the Gilmore Band circa 1892

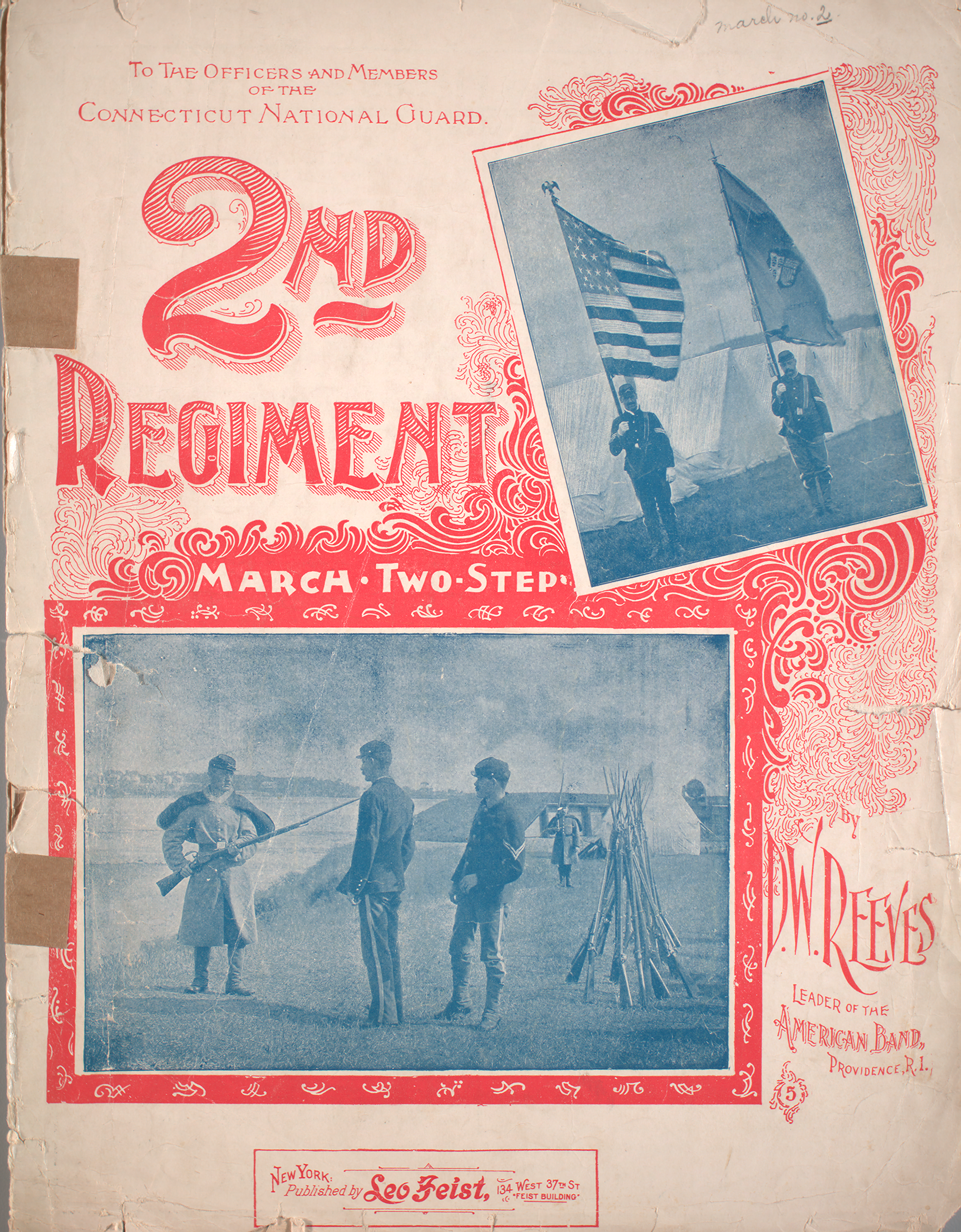
Second Regiment Connecticut National Guard March

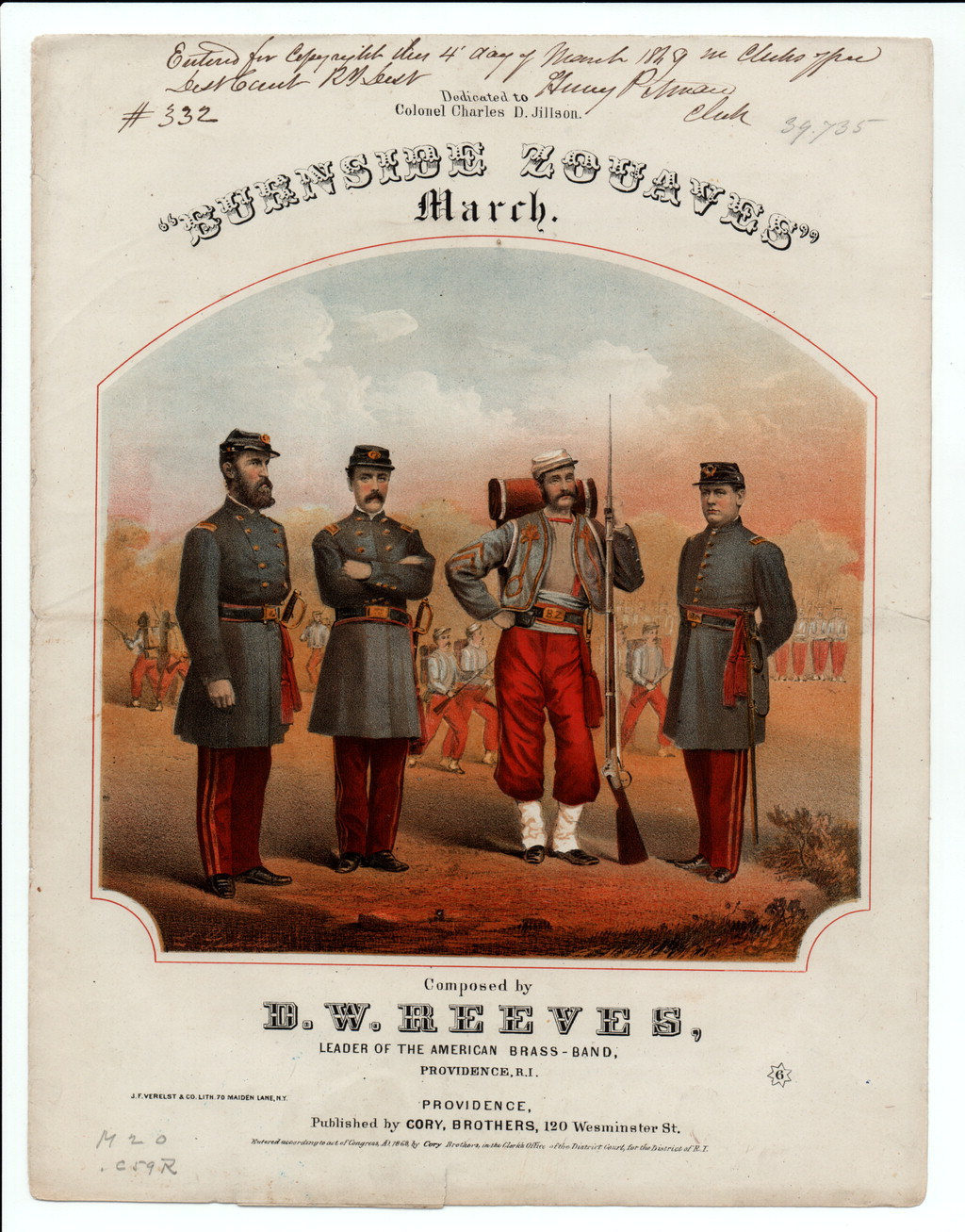
Burnside Zouaves March, 1868

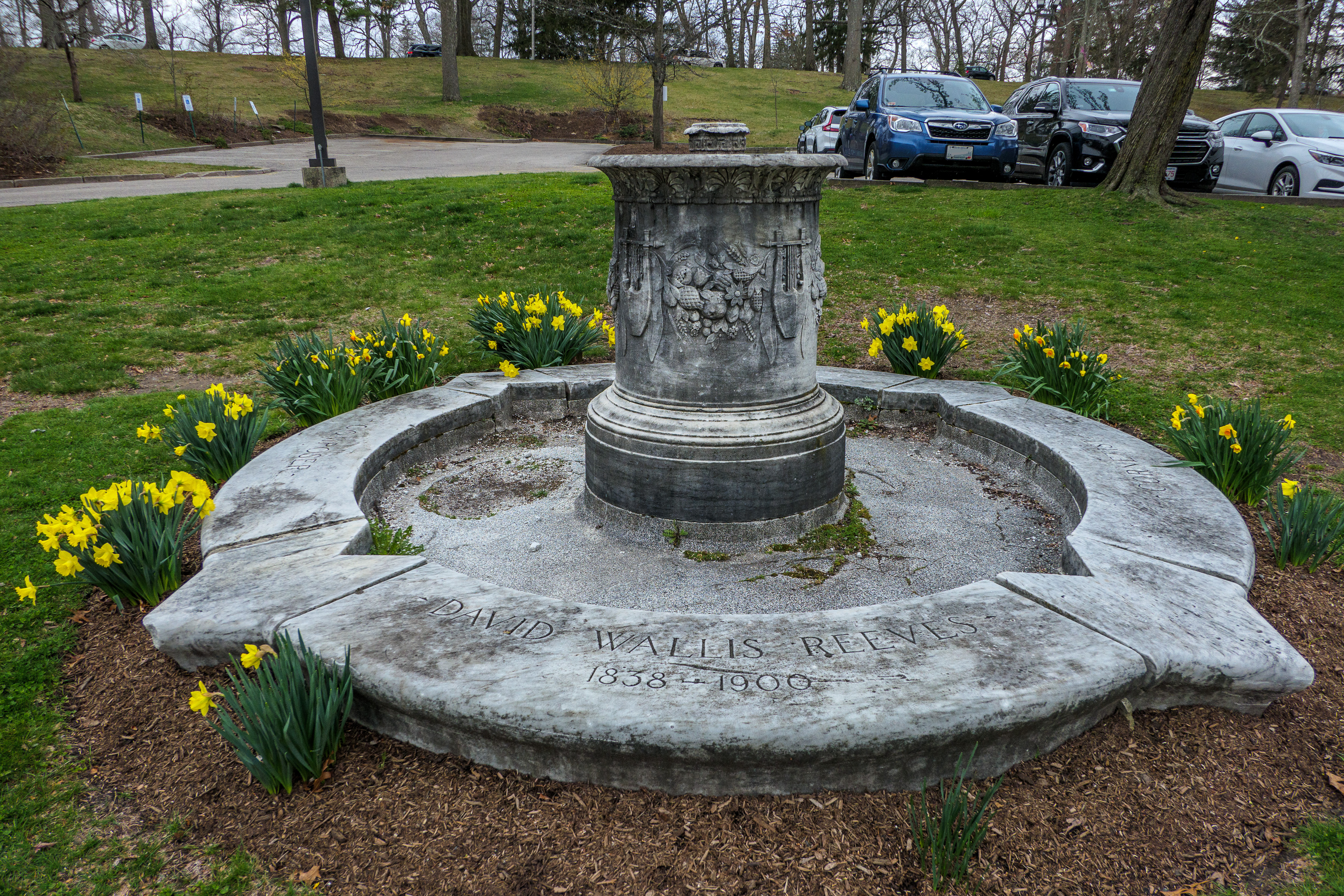
David Wallis Reeves memorial fountain in Roger Williams Park

David Wallis Reeves (February 14, 1838 – March 8, 1900), also known as D. W. Reeves or Wally Reeves, was an American composer, cornetist, and bandleader. He developed the American march style, later made famous by the likes of John Philip Sousa, and his innovations include adding a countermelody to the American march form in 1876. Sousa called Reeves "The Father of Band Music in America", and stated he wished he himself had written Reeves' "Second Regiment Connecticut National Guard March". Charles Ives also borrowed from the "Second Connecticut" on four occasions.

== Biography ==
Reeves was born on February 14, 1838, in Oswego, New York. In the early 1850s, he joined the Oswego band as an alto horn player, but soon moved to cornet, the instrument for which he would become famous. He occasionally performed with Jules Levy, another famous cornetist of the period. In 1871, he married Sarah Blanding. Blanding had a daughter from a previous marriage, and they were later to have a son, David W. Reeves Jr.

Reeves was a cornetist with the Dodworth Band of New York before being recruited by the American Brass Band of Providence, Rhode Island in 1866. He joined the ensemble on February 17, and was elected its leader on April 9. His initial compensation was $600 per year, plus the proceeds of one concert, in return for which he agreed to conduct the band on all occasions. He eventually added woodwinds to the formerly all-brass band, which became known as Reeves' American Band. It was known as one of the best marching bands in the country during his tenure. In the 1870s, he created the first local orchestra in Providence, the Providence Symphony Orchestra.

Reeves accepted the directorship of Patrick Gilmore's Twenty-Second New York Regiment band after Gilmore's death in September 1892, and led Gilmore's band at the 1893 Chicago World's Columbian Exposition. Reeves returned to the American Band after a year.

In 1878, Reeves led a performance of H.M.S. Pinafore, using a boat for the stage, which Arthur Sullivan took note of. Later in the 1890s, he served as a judge for the New York Volunteer Firemen's Association's band competitions.

== Death and burial ==
Early in 1900, he contracted Bright's disease. He died on March 8, 1900. His funeral service took place at the First Baptist Church in America, where he had frequently led the American Band as part of Brown University's Commencement ceremonies, and included a performance of his Immortalis by the American Band. John Philip Sousa sent 200 roses in his memory. He was buried at Swan Point Cemetery with Masonic honors.

== Legacy ==
By the time of his death in 1900, he had composed over 100 works. In 1926, a marble fountain was built as a memorial to Reeves in Roger Williams Park in Providence.
