= Clarke Studies =

Series of trumpet method books

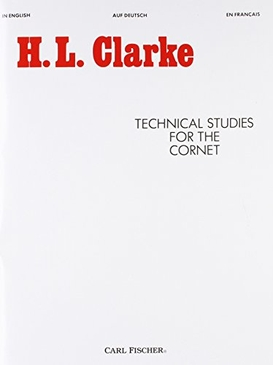
- Technical Studies for the Cornet
- Author: Herbert L. Clarke
- Original title: Clarke's Elementary Studies for Cornet; Clarke's Technical Studies for Cornet; Clarke's Characteristic Studies for Cornet
- Subject: Musical Instruments: Studies and exercises, Cornet music, Trumpet music
- Genre: sheet music
- Published: 1909-1915
- Publisher: L. B. Clarke, Carl Fischer
- Publication place: United States

The Clarke Studies are a series of pedagogical method books written by Herbert L. Clarke for students of cornet, trumpet, clarinet, and other wind instruments published from 1909 to 1915. Initially intended as a 3-volume series of increasing difficulty, the middle volume titled Clarke's Technical Studies (1912) would gain a following independent of the other volumes, becoming "one of the most widely used trumpet method books" and drawing comparisons to the Arban Method. The Technical Studies were preceded by Elementary Studies (1909) and followed by Characteristic Studies (1915), all originally published by L. B. Clarke of Elkhart, Indiana, later passing to Carl Fischer and other publishers. A fourth work published in 1929 called Setting Up Drills, a short collection of 38 exercises in four groups meant to strengthen the lips and be played for half an hour each day, is sometimes considered part of the series.

== Elementary Studies ==
The first volume, intended for beginners, was published in 1909 as Clarke's Elementary Studies for Cornet. It includes the author's discussions of the positioning of the mouthpiece on the lips, tone, breathing, musical terms, 30 graded lessons, and 116 exercises. The first 35 exercises in the first seven lessons are limited to a single octave, using only whole notes, half notes, and quarter notes. The next 30 exercises in the next seven lessons expand the range on the cornet with a focus on intervals and endurance while introducing eighth notes, dotted notes, and rests rhythmically. This group of lessons ends by introducing accidentals for the chromatic scale. The remaining 51 exercises in the last sixteen lessons introduce sixteenth notes and triplets while visiting all major keys in order of increasing number of flats and sharps. At the end of the thirtieth lesson, there is a 63-measure comprehensive study in 3/4 time ( = 80) and examples of Clarke's exercises for extended range.

== Technical Studies ==
The second volume, published in 1912 as Clarke's Technical Studies for Cornet, includes 190 exercises divided into ten studies with notes from the author suggesting how to practice them. Each of the ten studies concludes with an exercise serving as an étude, except for the ninth study, which lacks an exercise labeled as such, and the tenth study, which ends with two named études. Carl Fischer revised and applied a new copyright to the work in 1984, simplifying the text and adding German and French translations alongside which have been criticized for losing some of the author's philosophy for playing brass.

Études
No.	Clarke's Title	Tempo	Written Key	Meter
26	Etude I	= 120	C major	6/8
45	Etude II	= 144	G major	common time
65	Etude III	= 138	C major	common time
86	Etude IV	= 144	G major	common time
117	Etude V	= 176	C major	common time
132	Etude VI	= 138	C minor	common time
170	Etude VII	. = 152	C major	12/8
177	Etude VIII	= 84	C major	2/4
189	An Irish Ballad	= 72	F major	3/4
190	An Old German Folksong	= 80	B♭ major	3/4

== Characteristic Studies ==
The third volume, published in 1915 as Clarke's Characteristic Studies for Cornet, contains a "Treatise on Tongueing" about single, double, and triple tongue technique, 24 characteristic studies inspired by violin methods and progressing alternatingly through the major and minor keys chromatically ascending, and 15 solos. It is considered a parallel to the "Characteristic Studies" portion of Arban's Method.

Characteristic Studies
No.	Written Key	Tempo Marking	Meter	Subdivision
1	C major	Allegro moderato = 120	common time	Sixteenth note
2	A minor	Allegro = 144	2/4	Sixteenth note
3	D♭ major	Allegro risoluto = 132	12/8	Eighth note
4	B♭ minor	Allegro misterioso = 120	common time	Sixteenth note
5	D major	Moderato energico = 72	3/4	Eighth note
6	B minor	Moderato marcato = 100	cut time	Eighth note
7	E♭ major	Allegro moderato = 132	3/4	Sixteenth note
8	C minor	Allegro agitato = 152	common time	Eighth note triplet
9	E major	Allegretto giusto = 104	2/4	Sixteenth note
10	C♯ minor	Allegro moderato = 96	3/4	Sixteenth note triplet
11	F major	Allegretto . = 188	9/8	Eighth note
12	D minor	Allegro moderato = 120	common time	Sixteenth note triplet
13	F♯ major	Vivace = 160	common time	Sixteenth note
14	E♭ minor	Allegretto con moto . = 196	12/8	Eighth note
15	G major	Allegro ma non troppo = 116	common time	Sixteenth note
16	E minor	Tempo di Bolero = 120	3/4	Sixteenth note triplet and Sixteenth note
17	A♭ major	Moderato = 112	common time	Sixteenth note
18	F minor	Moderato = 92	common time	Sixteenth note
19	A major	Allegro vivace . = 152	6/8	Eighth note
20	F♯ minor	Furioso = 132	common time	Sixteenth note
21	B♭ major	Moderato = 96	common time	Eighth note
22	G minor	Allegretto = 108	3/4	Sixteenth note
23	B major	Moderato = 144	3/4	Eighth note
24	G♯ minor	Andante cantabile . = 72	9/8	Eighth note

Solo Pieces
No.	Clarke's Title	Clarke's Subtitle	Written Keys	Meters
1	The Bride of the Waves	Polka Brillante Concert Adaptation	F major and B♭ major	and 2/4
2	The Harp That Once Thro' Tara's Halls	Cornet Solo with Variations	F major	common time
3	Sounds from the Hudson	Valse Brillante Concert Adaptation	G major, C major, and F major	3/4
4	From the Shores of the Mighty Pacific	Rondo Caprice	C major, G major, and F major	and 2/4
5	The Débutanté	Caprice Brillante	C major and F major	and 2/4
6	Carnival of Venice	Cornet Solo with Variations	F major	6/8
7	Showers of Gold	Scherzo	F major and B♭ major	3/4 and 2/4
8	Du Du Liegst Mir Im Herzen	Cornet Solo with Variations	B♭ major	3/4
9	The Southern Cross	Cornet Solo Romantique	G minor and E♭ major	3/4 and 2/4
10	Side Partners		F major and B♭ major	and 2/4
11	Twilight Dreams	Waltz Intermezzo	F major	3/4
12	Lillian	Polka Caprice	F major and B♭ major	and 2/4
13	The Maid of the Mist	Polka	C major, F major, and B♭ major	3/4 and 2/4
14	Neptune's Court		G major and C major	2/4 and 6/8
15	My Love for You		F major	common time
