= Mandolins in North America =

History of the mandolin in North America

Archtop mandolins

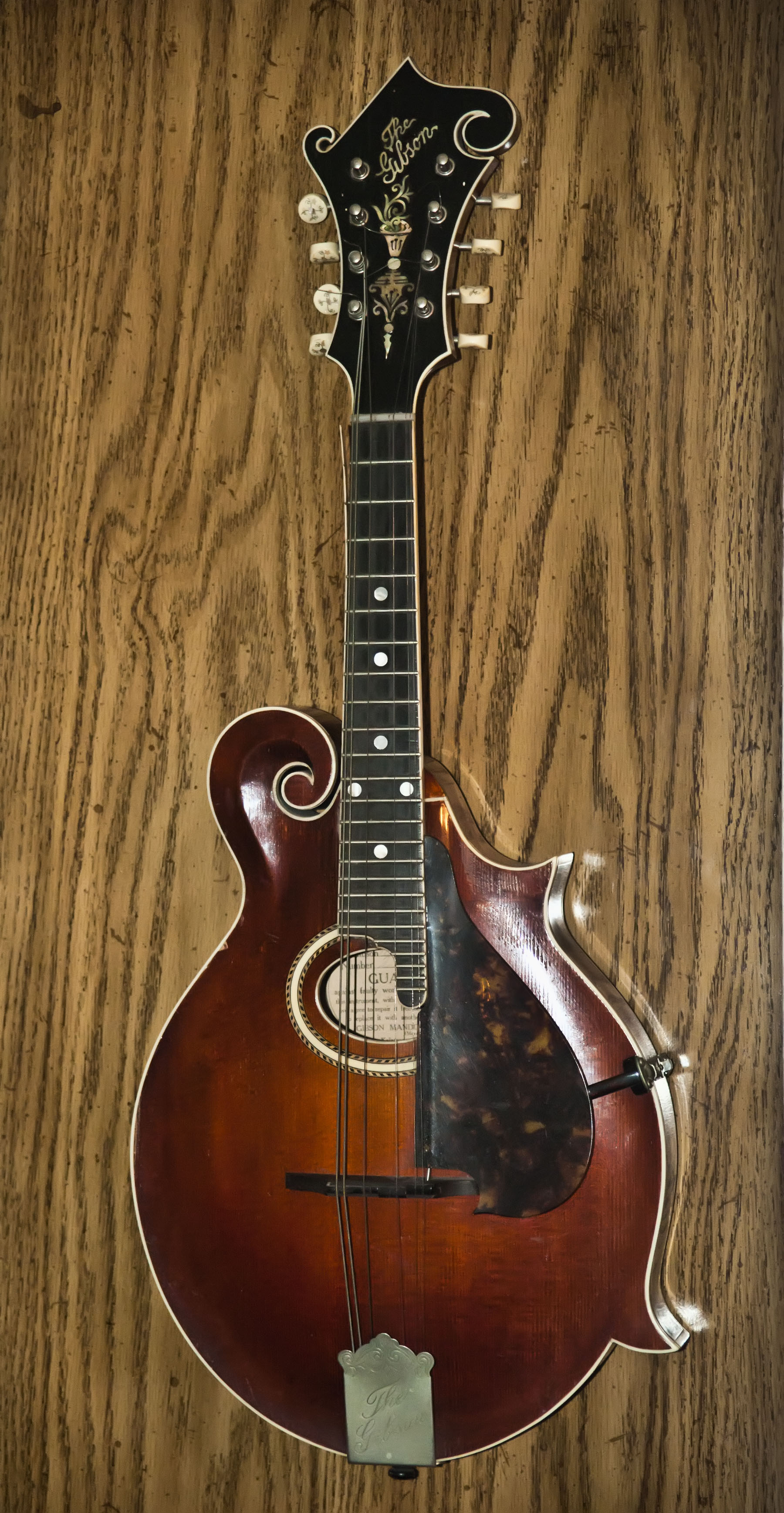
1916 Gibson F4 with arched and carved top, curled scroll and oval soundhole.

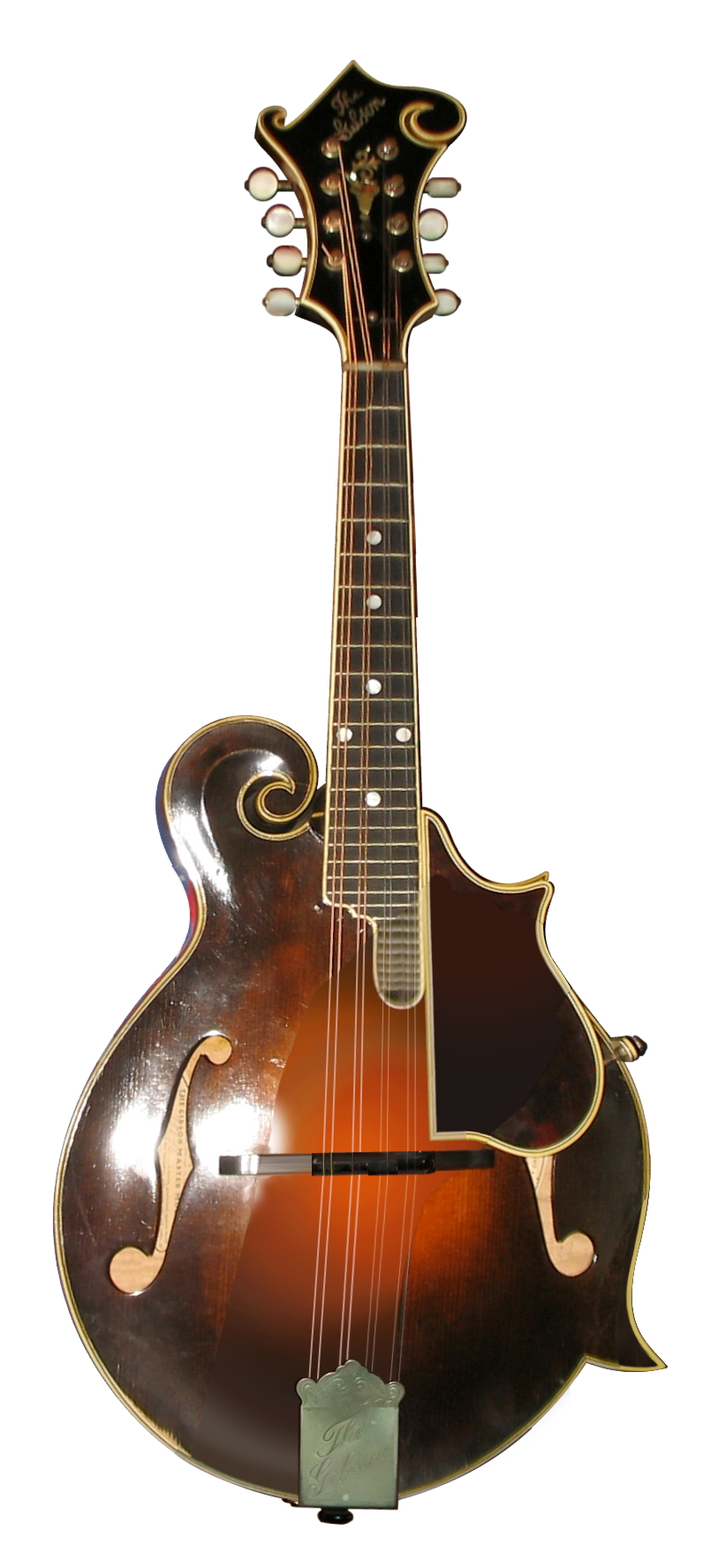
1924 Gibson F-5 mandolin, with f-shaped soundholes designed by Lloyd Loar

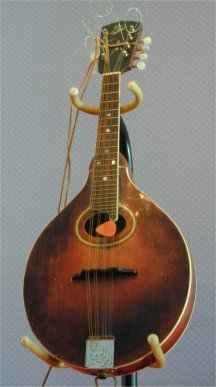
1921 Gibson A4 mandolin

The mandolin has had a place in North American culture since the 1880s, when a "mandolin craze" began. The continent was a land of immigrants, including Italian immigrants, some of whom brought their mandolins with them. In spite of the mandolin having arrived in America, it was not in the cultural consciousness until after 1880 when the Spanish Students arrived on their international performing tour. Afterwards, a "mandolin craze" swept the United States, with large numbers of young people taking up the instrument and teachers such as Samuel Siegel touring the United States. The fad died out after World War I, but enough had learned the instrument that it remained. The mandolin found a new surge with the music of Bill Monroe; the Gibson F-5 mandolin he played, as well as other archtop instruments, became the American standard for mandolins. Bowlback mandolins were displaced. The instrument has been taken up in blues, bluegrass, jug-band music, country, rock, punk and other genres of music. While not as popular as the guitar, it is widespread across the country.

The music scene in Canada as the United States is similar, with both countries having a common origin and having English-based music in the same genres, such as rock, country, bluegrass. The mandolin has found a home in both countries. Mexico, the other nation in North America has a history with different origins. Its instruments reflect that origin, and it too had a connection to the mandolin's development in North America.

== Mandolin orchestras and classical-music virtuosos ==
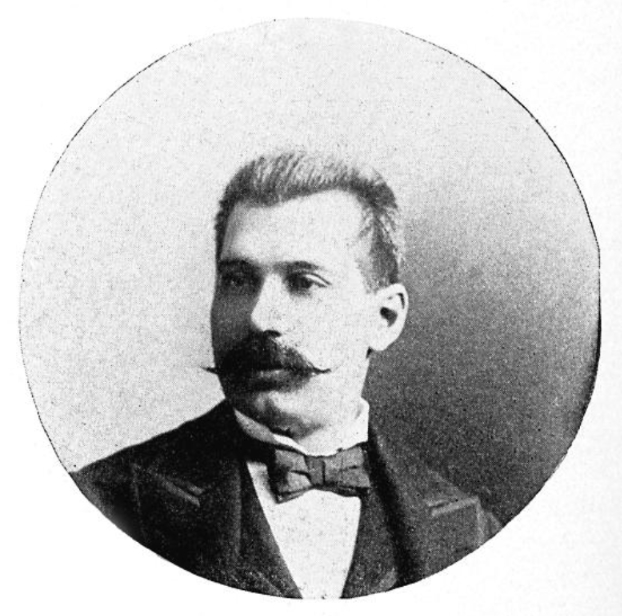
Carlo Curti founded one of Mexico's oldest orchestras, the Mexican Typical Orchestra, and helped to popularize mandolin in the United States.

See also: mandolin orchestras

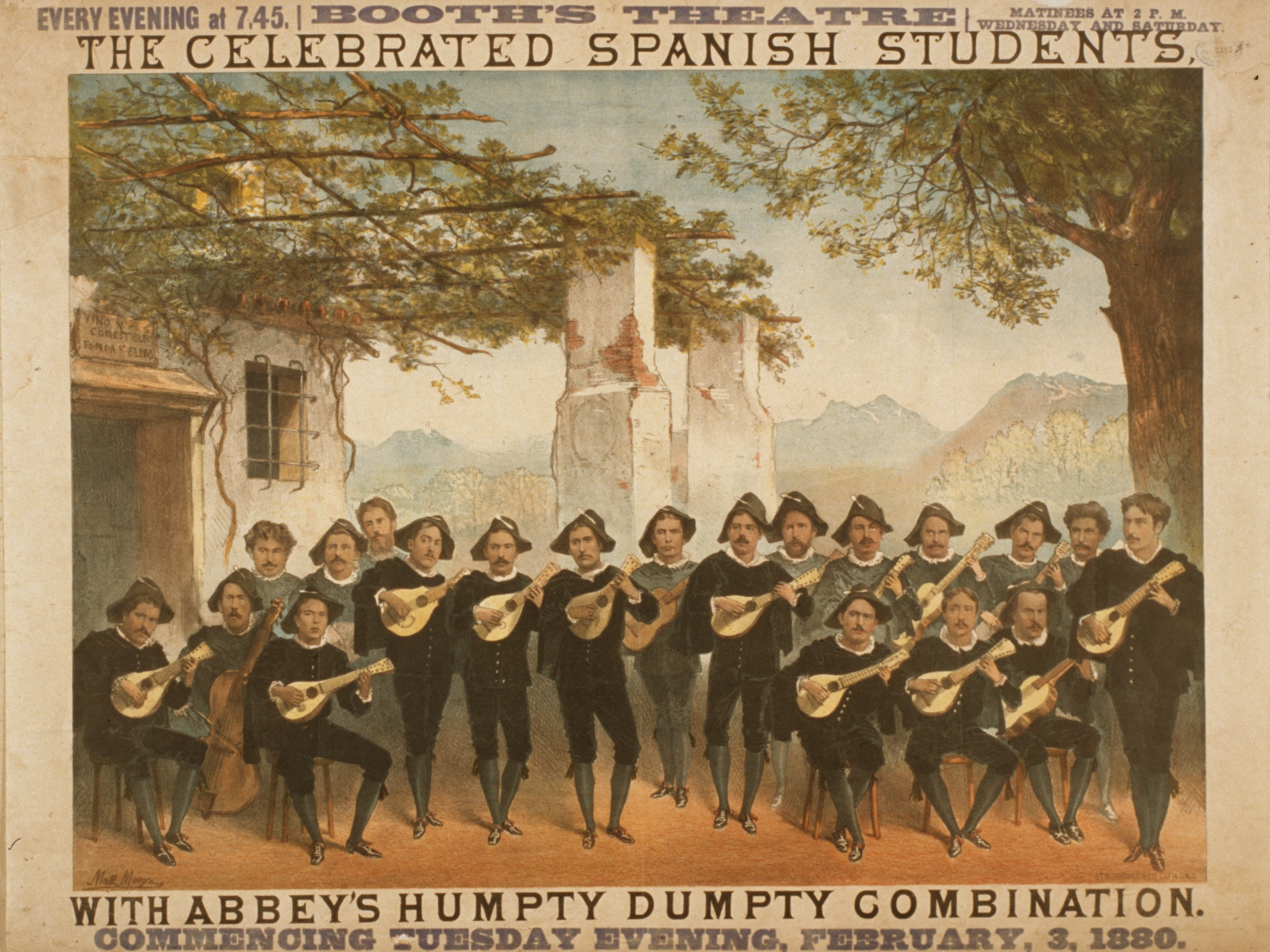
The Spanish Students, who were first brought to the United States by Henry Eugene Abbey's firm, performing with his "Humpty Dumpty Combination." This poster was for a Manhattan performance February 3, 1880, at the Booth's Theatre on the corner of 6th Avenue and 23rd Street.

The mandolin's popularity in the United States was spurred by the success of a group of touring young European musicians known as the Estudiantina Figaro, or in the United States, simply the "Spanish Students." The group landed in the U.S. on January 2, 1880 in New York City, and played in Boston and New York to wildly enthusiastic crowds. Ironically, this ensemble did not play mandolins but rather bandurrias, which are also small, double-strung instruments that resemble the mandolin.

The success of the Figaro Spanish Students spawned other groups who imitated their musical style and costumes. An Italian musician, Carlo Curti, hastily started a musical ensemble after seeing the Figaro Spanish Students perform; his group of Italian born Americans called themselves the "Original Spanish Students," counting on the American public to not know the difference between the Spanish bandurrias and Italian mandolins. The imitators' use of mandolins helped to generate enormous public interest in an instrument previously relatively unknown in the United States.

Another imitation group was Zerega's Spanish Troubadours, a quintet of three mandolins and two guitars. They weren't Spanish, and Zerega was the stage name of Indiana-born Edgar E. Hill who played with his wife May, both Americans, who had eloped to London, but toured America in 1887.

Seth Weeks, 1900. Possibly the first African American to play mandolin during its golden period. First American known to write a mandolin concerto (in 1900); led a mandolin and guitar orchestra in Tacoma, Washington.

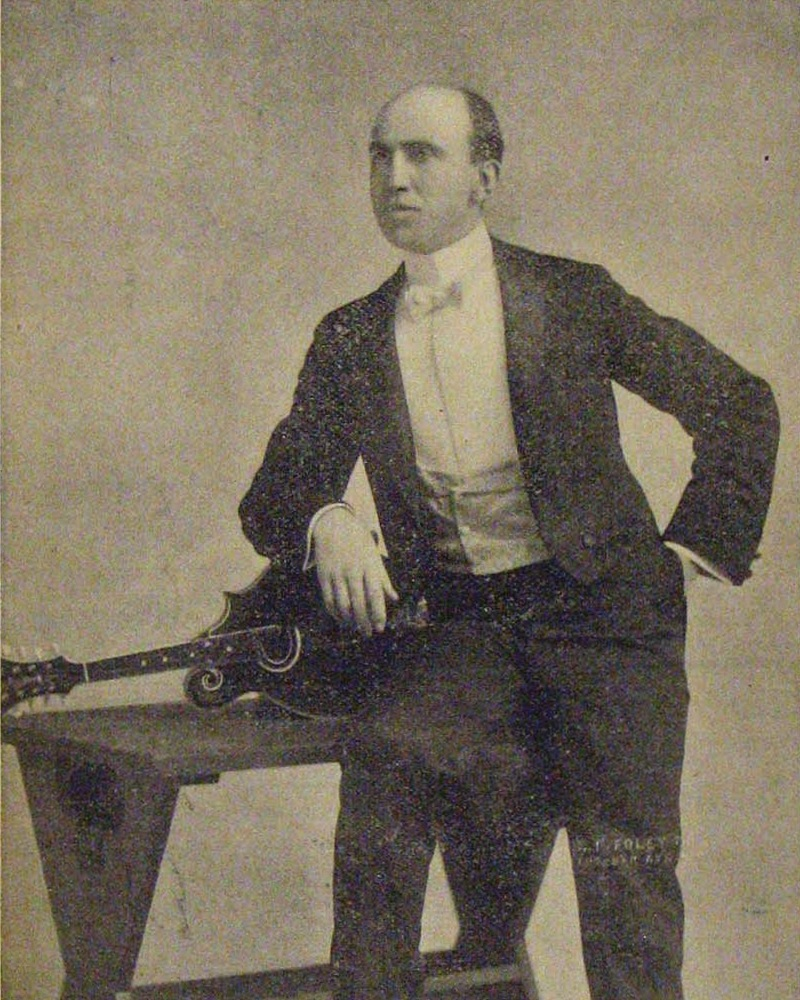
Valentine Abt posing with a Gibson mandolin in a 1912 endorsement advertisement for the instrument. Abt called the Gibson Company "the pioneer of plectrum instrument making in America" and mentioned its carrying power.

Mandolin awareness in the United States blossomed in the 1880s, as the instrument became part of a fad that continued into the mid-1920s. According to Clarence L. Partee a publisher in the BMG movement (banjo, mandolin and guitar), the first mandolin made in the United States was made in 1883 or 1884 by Joseph Bohmann, who was an established maker of violins in Chicago. Partee characterized the early instrument as being larger than the European instruments he was used to, with a "peculiar shape" and "crude construction," and said that the quality improved, until American instruments were "superior" to imported instruments. At the time, Partee was using an imported French-made mandolin. By the year 1900 mandolin sales constituted 10.6 percent of the nation's "small goods" musical instrument sales, less than the 21.3 percent of the market that music boxes held and more than the guitar's 9.6 percent. The mandolin also outsold zithers, "Apollo harps" and autoharps at 8.6 percent and brass instruments for bands at 7.5 percent of total sales.

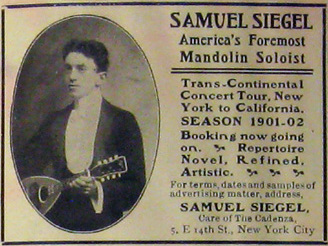
1902 advertisement, concert tour by Samuel Siegel.

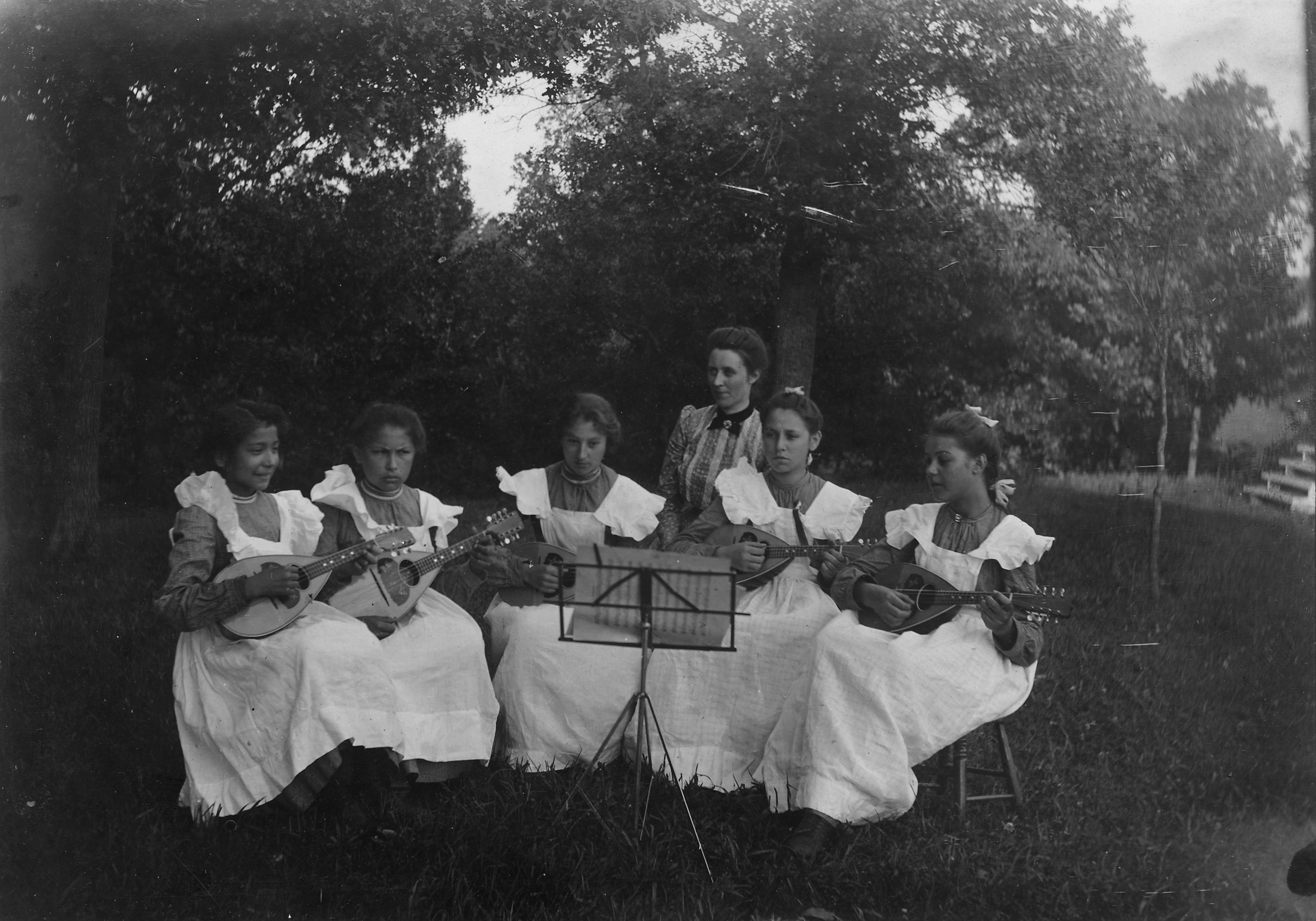
Native American girls' mandolin orchestra, 1905

Carlo Curti - Merci (1896)
Merci - gavotte by Carlo Curti, performed by Joaquín J. Arriaga and Octaviano Yáñez in 1913

Samuel Siegel and Roy Butin play Gavotte.
A 1909 Edison Amberol recording of Samuel Siegel on mandolin and Roy Butin on guitar.

Valentine Abt plays Angel's Serenade.
Recording of Valentine Abt on mandolin, 1905.

Instruments were marketed by teacher-dealers, much as the title character in the popular musical The Music Man. Often, these teacher-dealers conducted mandolin orchestras: groups of four to fifty musicians who played various mandolin family instruments. However, alongside the teacher-dealers were serious musicians, working to create a spot for the instrument in classical music, ragtime and jazz. Like the teacher-dealers, they traveled the U.S., recording records, giving performances and teaching individuals and mandolin orchestras. Samuel Siegel played mandolin in Vaudeville and became one of America's preeminent mandolinists. Another vaudeville performer, Bob Yosco, from the double act Lyons and Yosco, is considered one of America's first ragtime mandolin players. Seth Weeks was an African American who not only taught and performed in the United States, but also in Europe, where he recorded records. Another pioneering African American musician and director who made his start with a mandolin orchestra was composer James Reese Europe. W. Eugene Page toured the country with a group, and was well known for his mandolin and mandola performances. Other names include Valentine Abt, Samuel Adelstein, William Place, Jr., Bernardo De Pace, and Aubrey Stauffer.

The instrument was primarily used in an ensemble setting well into the 1930s, and although the fad died out at the beginning of the 1930s, the instruments that were developed for the orchestra found a new home in bluegrass. The famous Lloyd Loar Master Model from Gibson (1923) was designed to boost the flagging interest in mandolin ensembles, with little success. However, the "Loar" became the defining instrument of bluegrass music when Bill Monroe purchased F-5 S/N 73987 in a Florida barbershop in 1943 and popularized it as his main instrument.

The mandolin orchestras never completely went away, however. In fact, along with all the other musical forms the mandolin is involved with, the mandolin ensemble (groups usually arranged like the string section of a modern symphony orchestra, with first mandolins, second mandolins, mandolas, mandocellos, mando-basses, and guitars, and sometimes supplemented by other instruments) continues to grow in popularity. Since the mid-nineties, several public-school mandolin-based guitar programs have blossomed around the country, including Fretworks Mandolin and Guitar Orchestra, the first of its kind. The national organization, Classical Mandolin Society of America, founded by Norman Levine, represents these groups. Prominent modern mandolinists and composers for mandolin in the classical music tradition include Samuel Firstman, Howard Fry, Rudy Cipolla, Dave Apollon, Neil Gladd, Evan Marshall, Marilynn Mair and Mark Davis (the Mair-Davis Duo), Brian Israel, David Evans, Emanuil Shynkman, Radim Zenkl, David Del Tredici and Ernst Krenek.

== Bluegrass and the jug band ==
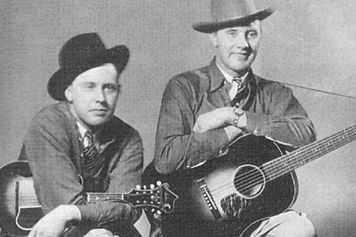
Bill and Charlie Monroe, 1936. Bill is pictured with a Gibson F-7 mandolin, which he replaced with an F-5 in 1945.

Bill Monroe's F-5.

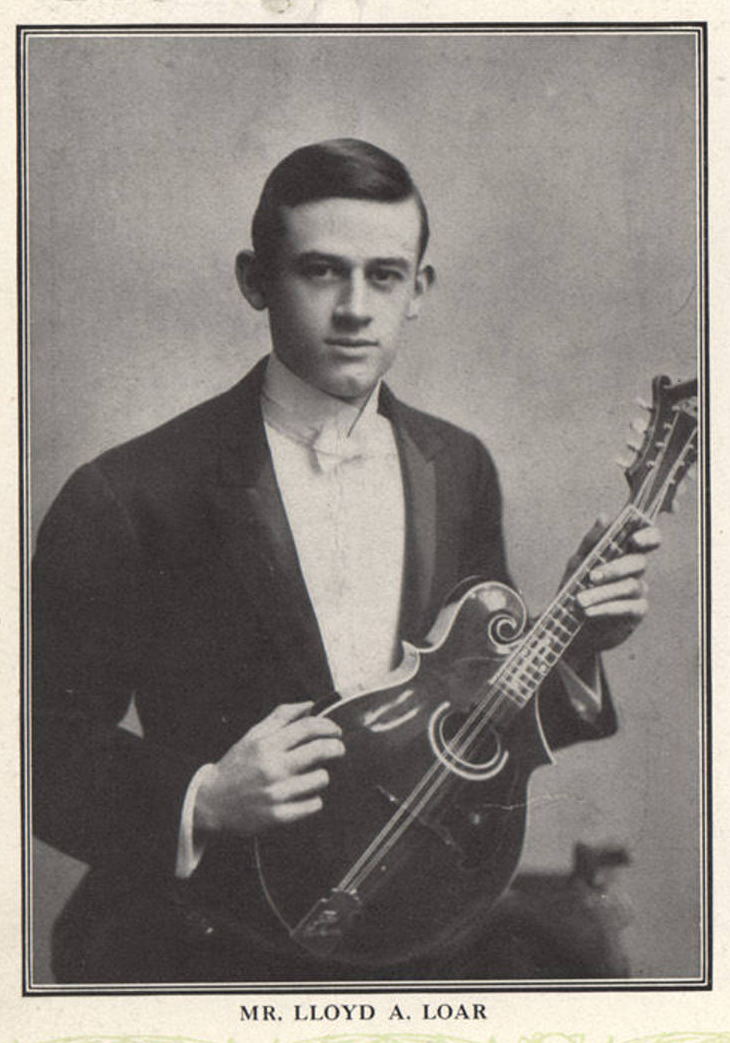
Lloyd Loar, performer and designer of the F-5.

When Cowan Powers and his family recorded their old-time music from 1924 to 1926, his daughter Orpha Powers was one of the earliest known southern-music artists to record with the mandolin. By the 1930s, single mandolins were becoming more commonly used in southern string band music, most notably by brother duets such as the sedate Blue Sky Boys (Bill Bolick and Earl Bolick), the Armstrong Twins (Lloyd and Floyd Armstrong) and the more hard-driving Monroe Brothers (Bill Monroe and Charlie Monroe). However, the mandolin's modern popularity in country music can be directly traced to one man: Bill Monroe, the father of bluegrass music. After the Monroe Brothers broke up in 1939, Bill Monroe formed his own group, after a brief time called the Blue Grass Boys, and completed the transition of mandolin styles from a "parlor" sound typical of brother duets to the modern "bluegrass" style. He joined the Grand Ole Opry in 1939 and its powerful clear-channel broadcast signal on WSM-AM spread his style throughout the South, directly inspiring many musicians to take up the mandolin. Monroe famously played Gibson F-5 mandolin, signed and dated July 9, 1923, by Lloyd Loar, chief acoustic engineer at Gibson. The F-5 has since become the most imitated tonally and aesthetically by modern builders.

Monroe's style involved playing lead melodies in the style of a fiddler, and also a percussive chording sound referred to as "the chop" for the sound made by the quickly struck and muted strings. He also perfected a sparse, percussive blues style, especially up the neck in keys that had not been used much in country music, notably B and E. He emphasized a powerful, syncopated right hand at the expense of left-hand virtuosity. Monroe's most influential follower of the second generation is Frank Wakefield and nowadays Mike Compton of the Nashville Bluegrass Band and David Long, who often tour as a duet. Tiny Moore of the Texas Playboys developed an electric five-string mandolin and helped popularize the instrument in Western swing music.

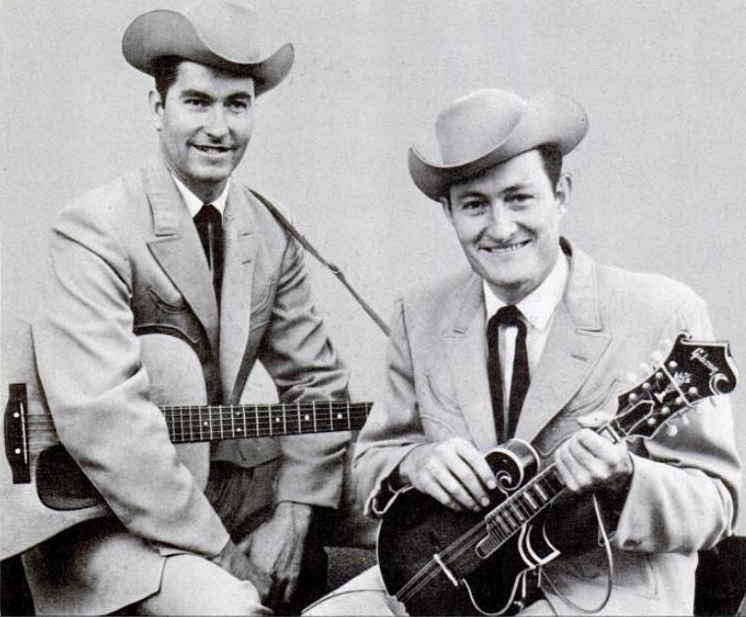
Jim & Jesse, 1965

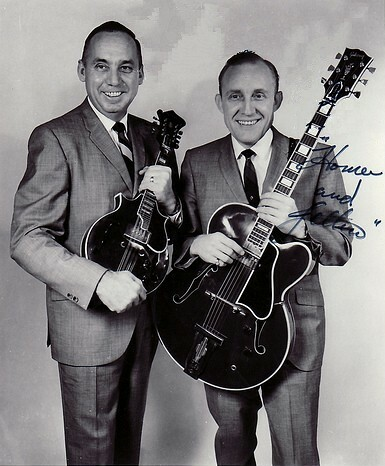
Homer and Jethro,1967

Other major bluegrass mandolinists who emerged in the early 1950s and are still active include Jesse McReynolds (of Jim and Jesse) who invented a syncopated banjo-roll-like style called crosspicking—and Bobby Osborne of the Osborne Brothers, who is a master of clarity and sparkling single-note runs. Highly respected and influential modern bluegrass players include Herschel Sizemore, Doyle Lawson, and the multi-genre Sam Bush, who is equally at home with old-time fiddle tunes, rock, reggae, and jazz. Ronnie McCoury of the Del McCoury Band has won numerous awards for his Monroe-influenced playing. John Duffey of the original Country Gentlemen and later the Seldom Scene did much to popularize the bluegrass mandolin among folk and urban audiences, especially on the east coast and in the Washington, D.C. area.

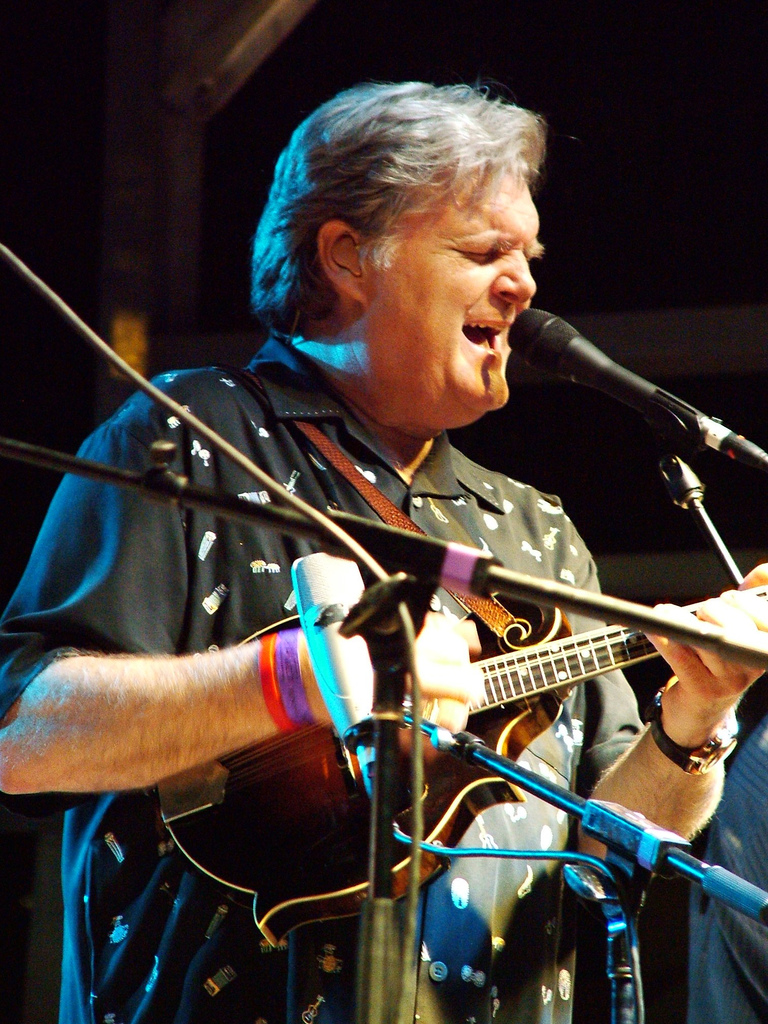
Ricky Skaggs, 2007

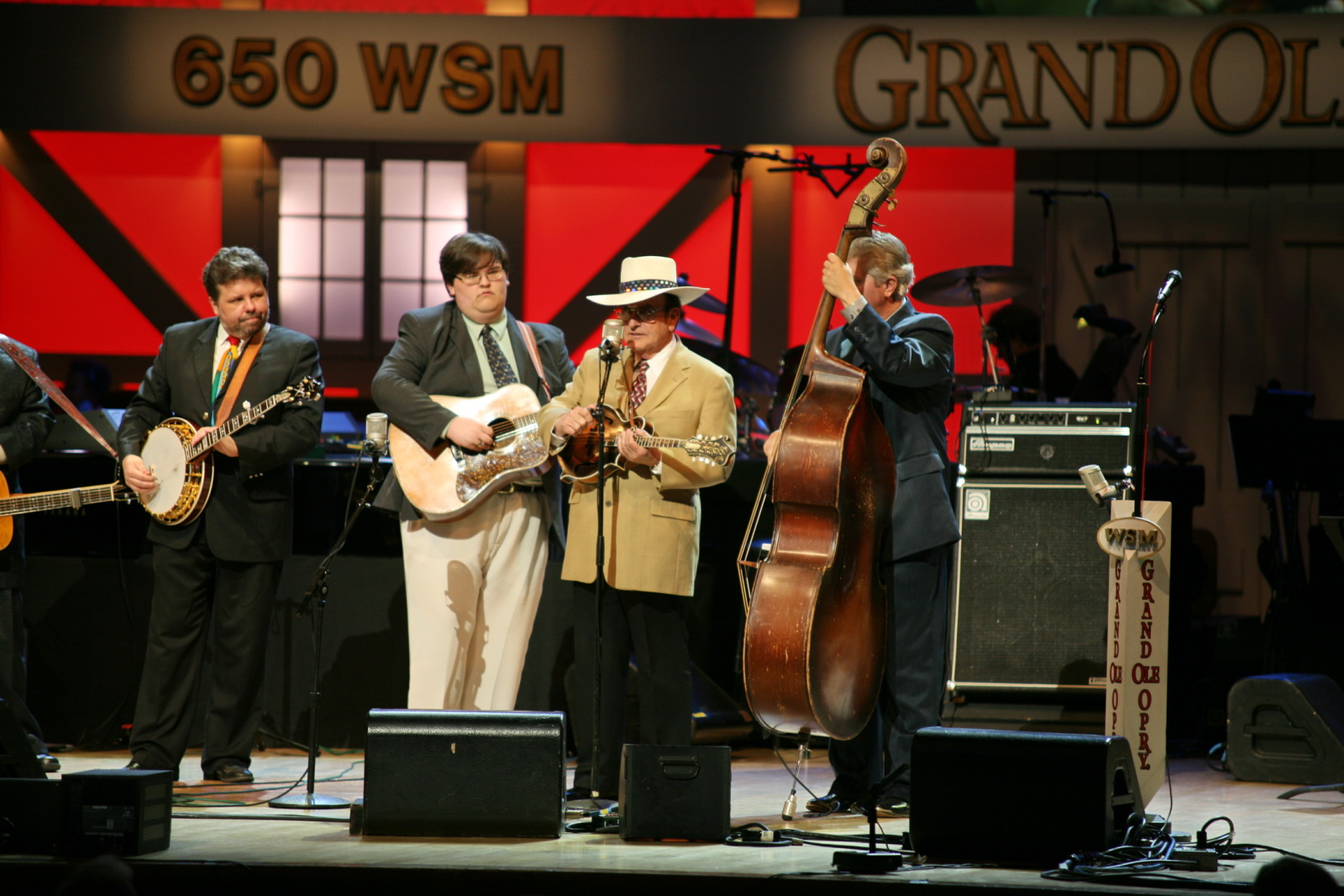
Bobby Osborne (playing mandolin) and Rocky Top, 2007.

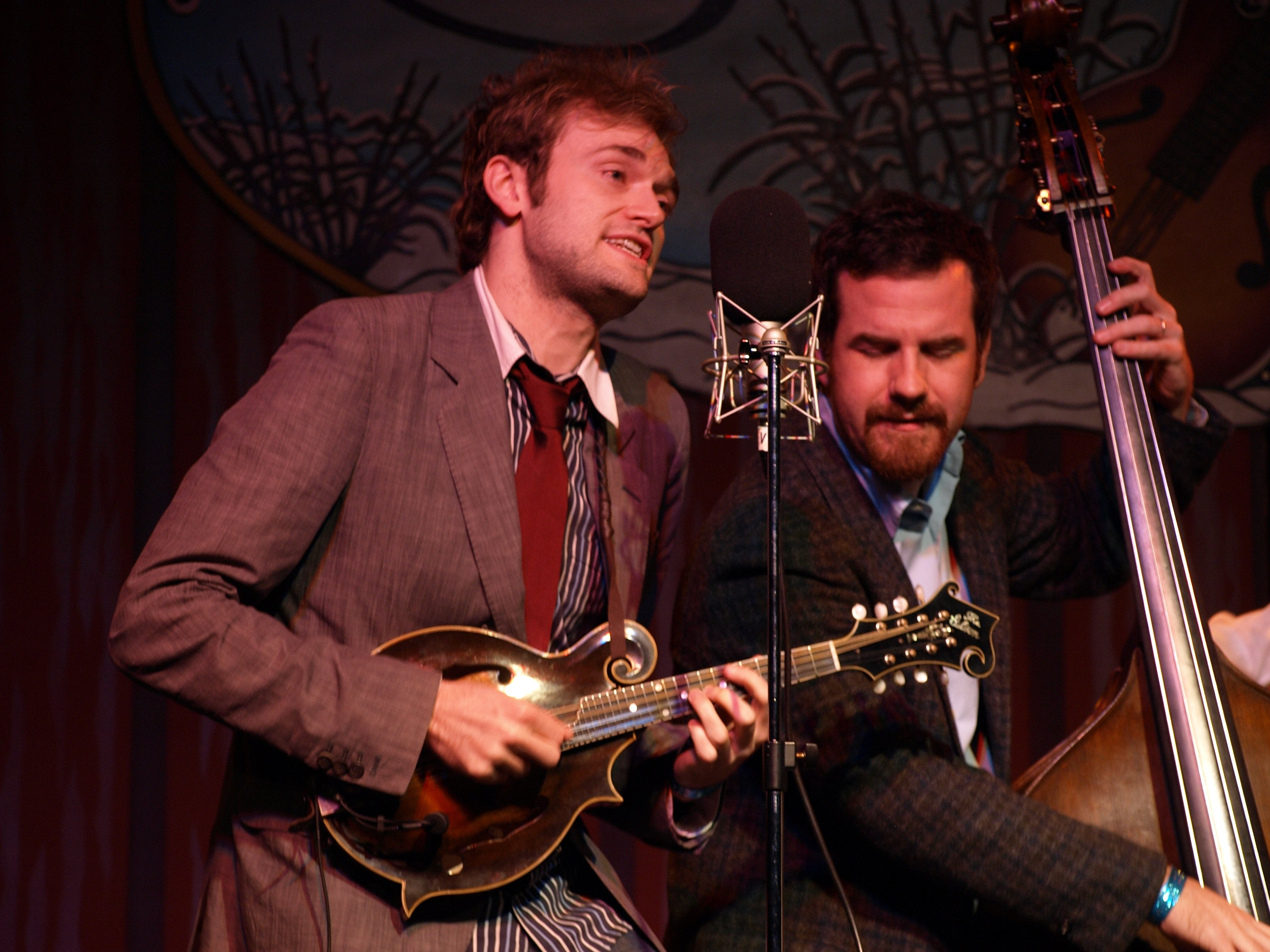
Chris Thile, 2012. Thile plays a Gibson F-5 mandolin, made by Lloyd Loar.

Jethro Burns, best known as half of the comedy duo Homer and Jethro, was also the first important jazz mandolinist. Tiny Moore popularized the mandolin in Western swing music. He initially played an 8-string Gibson but switched after 1952 to a 5-string solidbody electric instrument built by Paul Bigsby. Modern players David Grisman, Sam Bush, and Mike Marshall, among others, have worked since the early 1970s to demonstrate the mandolin's versatility for all styles of music. Chris Thile of California is a well-known player, and has accomplished many feats of traditional bluegrass, classical, contemporary pop and rock; the band Nickel Creek featured his playing in its blend of traditional and pop styles, and he now plays in his band Punch Brothers. Most commonly associated with bluegrass, mandolin has been used a lot in country music over the years. Some well-known players include Marty Stuart, Vince Gill, Steve Earle and Ricky Skaggs.

It saw some use in jug band music, since that craze began as the mandolin fad was waning, and there were plenty of instruments available at relatively low cost.

== Blues and jazz ==
Mandolin has also been used in blues music performed by Ry Cooder, Yank Rachell, Johnny "Man" Young, Carl Martin, and Gerry Hundt. Howard Armstrong, known for his blues violin, got his start with his father's mandolin and played in string bands similar to the other Tennessee string bands he came into contact with, with band makeup including "mandolins and fiddles and guitars and banjos". Other blues players from the era's string bands include Willie Black (Whistler And His Jug Band), Joe Evans (The Two Poor Boys), Dink Brister, Jim Hill, Charles Johnson, Coley Jones (Dallas String Band), Bobby Leecan (Need More Band), Alfred Martin, Charlie McCoy (1909–1950), Al Miller, Matthew Prater, and Herb Quinn.

== Rock and new genres ==
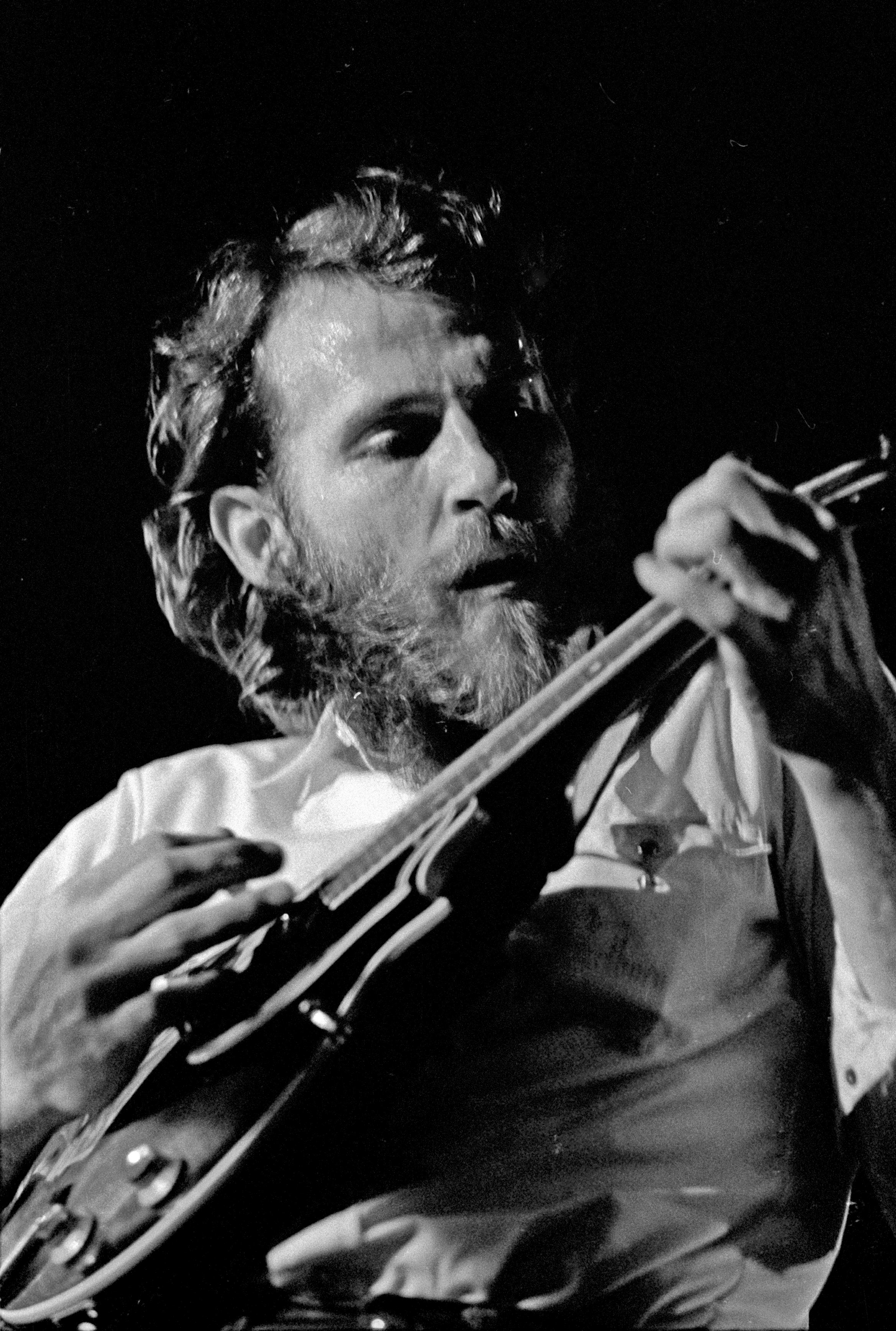
Levon Helm playing mandolin in 1971

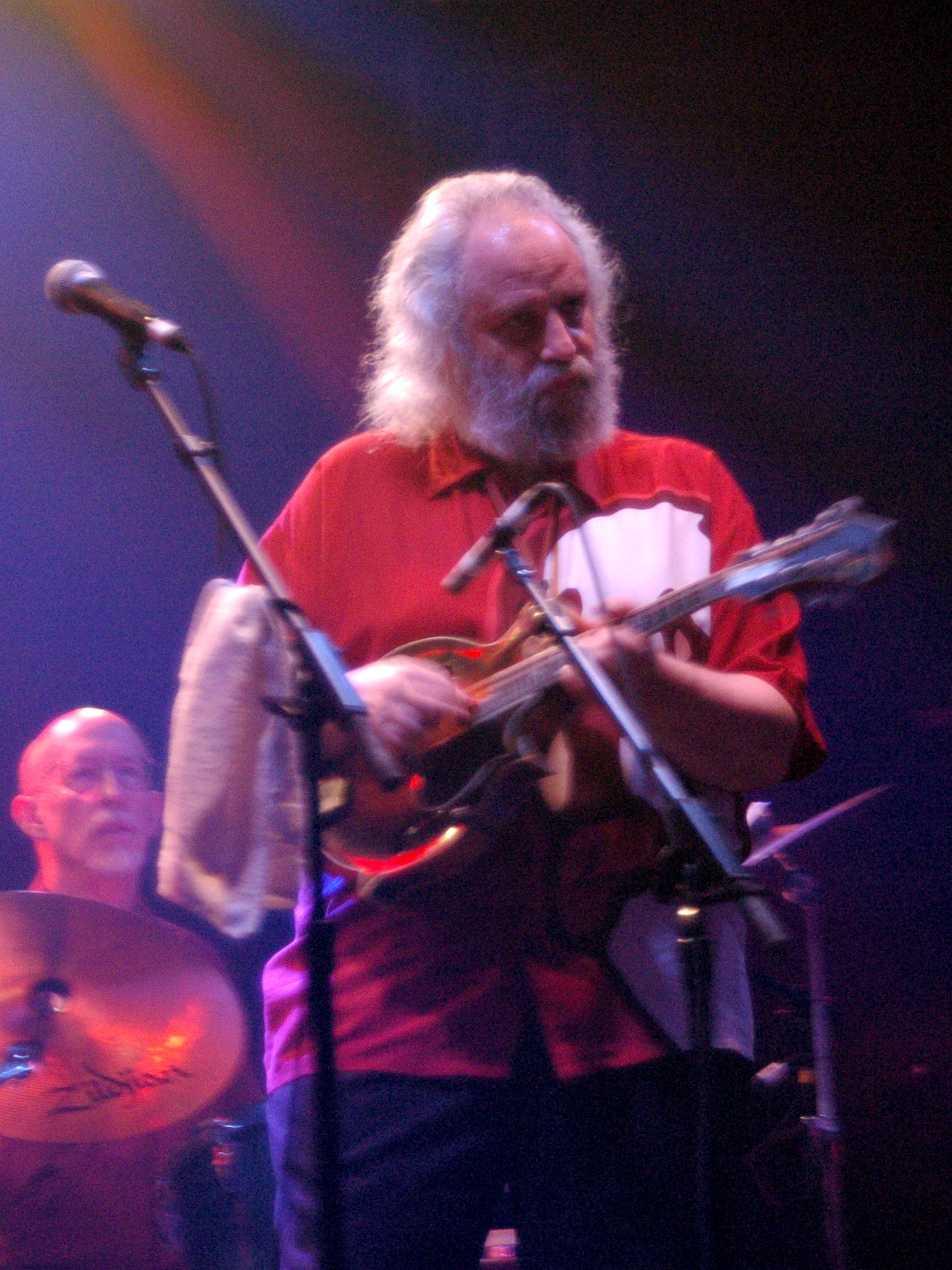
David Grisman fused bluegrass, folk and jazz into Dawg music.

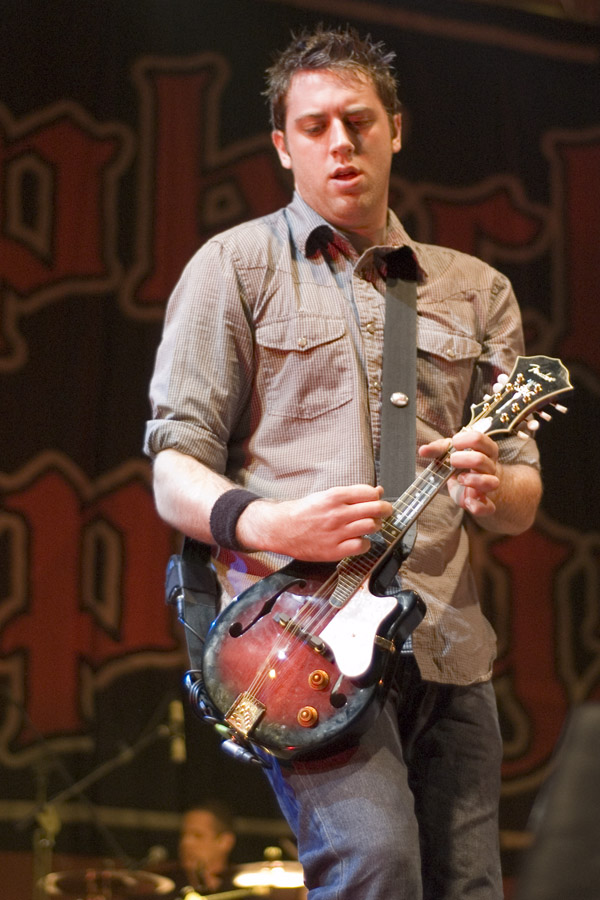
Tim Brennan of the Dropkick Murpheys.

The mandolin has been used occasionally in rock music, first appearing in the psychedelic era of the late 1960s. Levon Helm of the Band occasionally moved from his drum kit to play mandolin, most notably on "Rag Mama Rag", "Rockin' Chair", and "Evangeline". Ian Anderson of Jethro Tull played mandolin on "Fat Man", from their second album, Stand Up, and occasionally on later releases. Rod Stewart's 1971 No. 1 hit "Maggie May" features a significant mandolin riff. David Grisman played mandolin on two Grateful Dead songs on the American Beauty album, "Friend of the Devil" and "Ripple", which became instant favorites among amateur pickers at jam sessions and campground gatherings. John Paul Jones and Jimmy Page both played mandolin on Led Zeppelin songs. Dash Crofts of the soft rock duo Seals and Crofts extensively used mandolin in their repertoire during the 1970s. Styx released the song "Boat on the River" in 1980, which featured Tommy Shaw on vocals and mandolin. The song didn't chart in the United States but was popular in much of Europe and the Philippines.

Some rock musicians today use mandolins, often single-stringed electric models rather than double-stringed acoustic mandolins. One example is Tim Brennan of the Irish-American punk rock band Dropkick Murphys. In addition to electric guitar, bass, and drums, the band uses several instruments associated with traditional Celtic music, including mandolin, tin whistle, and Great Highland bagpipes. The band explains that these instruments accentuate the growling sound they favor. The 1991 R.E.M. hit "Losing My Religion" was driven by a few simple mandolin licks played by guitarist Peter Buck, who also played the mandolin in nearly a dozen other songs. The single peaked at No. 4 on the Billboard Hot 100. The track "I Will Dare", by alternative rock band The Replacements, which features a Peter Buck guitar solo, also features songwriter Paul Westerberg on mandolin. Luther Dickinson of North Mississippi Allstars and the Black Crowes has made frequent use of the mandolin, most notably on the Black Crowes song "Locust Street". Armenian American rock group System of a Down makes extensive use of the mandolin on their 2005 double album Mezmerize/Hypnotize. Pop punk band Green Day has used a mandolin in several occasions, especially on their 2000 album, Warning. Boyd Tinsley, violin player of the Dave Matthews Band has been using an electric mandolin since 2005. Frontman Colin Meloy and guitarist Chris Funk of the Decemberists regularly employ the mandolin in the band's music. Nancy Wilson, rhythm guitarist of Heart, uses a mandolin in Heart's song "Dream of the Archer" from the album Little Queen, as well as in Heart's cover of Led Zeppelin's song "The Battle of Evermore". "Show Me Heaven" by Maria McKee, the theme song to the film Days of Thunder, prominently features a mandolin. The popular alt rock group Imagine Dragons feature the mandolin on a few of their songs, most prominently being "It's Time". Folk rock band the Lumineers use a mandolin in the background of their 2012 hit "Ho Hey".

Many folk punk bands also feature the mandolin. One such band is Days N' Daze, who make use of the mandolin, banjo, ukulele, as well as several other acoustic plucked string instruments. Other mandolin inclusive folk punk acts include Blackbird Raum, and Johnny Hobo and the Freight Trains.

== In Mexico ==
Colonized by Spain, Mexico had both Spanish instruments as well as instruments created locally. These include the bandurria and the bandolón.

When Carlo Curti finished with playing mandolin with his "Spanish Students" in the United States, he organized a new act in Mexico in 1883-1884, the Mexican Typical Orchestra, which performed at the World's Industrial and Cotton Exposition (1885) in New Orleans and then toured the United States. The band included as many as seven bandolóns. Bandolóns were developed in Mexico, guitar sized instruments with 18 strings (in 6 courses of 3) related to the bandurria. When described in U.S. newspapers, it was noted that they looked like large mandolins. It was also noted that Carlo Curti was a well-known mandolin player, and some newspapers never found out what the bandolóns were, calling them mandolins.

The confusion may have added further to the impression in the United States that the mandolin and bandurria families were related. Musician Robert Braine wrote in the Etude in August 1918 that "the craze for the mandolin in the United States was a direct result of the concert tours, covering several years, of two of such orchestras, the "Spanish Students" and the "Mexican Typical Orchestra" from Mexico City. Braine was aware of the nature of the Neapolitan mandolin, but lumped mandolins and bandurrias together in his article, saying that the mandolin was "played, studied and taught" in Spain, Mexico and the South American countries.
