= Evan Marshall (musician) =

Virtuoso mandolinist

Evan Marshall is a virtuoso mandolinist, prominent as an arranger of classical music pieces for the mandolin and proponent of the duo style of playing. His name comes up in mandolin-oriented music circles as one of the best of modern mandolin players, one who has taken the techniques of early mandolin soloists to new levels. He is also a recording artist with Rounder Records and teaches mandolin. He has given classes for the Classical Mandolin Society of America, the Mandolin Symposium and the American Mandolin and Guitar Summer School, and has been associated with the Conservatory of Music at Biola University. As a performer, he has worked as a featured guest with several symphony orchestras, including the Houston Symphony, Phoenix Symphony, and Buffalo Philharmonic Orchestra. He is a former member of Billy Hill and the Hillbillies.

== Early beginnings ==
Marshall played the violin from the time he was 7-years old, playing classical. He was inspired by Chet Atkins and learned about bluegrass music after seeing Atkins play on television. He pursued bluegrass, joining a folk music club, and when he was 14 years old, discovered the mandolin, by way of a clubmember with a mandolin at home.

== Duo style ==
Marshall plays with what he calls a "musician's sleight of hand", the duo style. Duo style is a technique in which the mandolin player plays both the melody line of music, as well as harmonic parts, sounding like more than one instrument. The technique was made famous by Giovanni Gioviale in the early 1900s. In the American tradition, the technique was used by early mandolin virtuosos Samuel Siegel, Valentine Abt and Seth Weeks in the late 19th and early 20th Centuries.

== Works ==
Marshall arranges music for the mandolin. Although he has been labeled a classical musician on the internet, his arrangements include American pop music, Beatles tunes and movie music.

=== Recorded Music ===
- Mandolin Unlimited (1987) Rounder Records, produced by Mark O'Connor
- Mandolin Magic (1990) Rounder Records, produced and Engineered by David Grisman
- Evan Marshall is the Lone Arranger (1995) Rounder Records
- Billy Tell & Vanilla Schubert: Evan J. Marshall, Solo Mandolin (2005) EvanJMarshall.com
- A Mandolin for Christmas (2008) EvanJMarshall.com
- Mr. Solo Mandolin: Evan J. Marshall, Solo Mandolin (2008) EvanJMarshall.com
- Twin Mandolin Slingers with Brian Oberlin (2015) EvanJMarshall.com
- Mandolin Mystery Tour (2016) EvanJMarshall.com
- Beethoven Country with Estudiantina de San Gabriel (2016) EvanJMarshall.com

=== Instructional works ===
- Duo-Style A to Z: A Comprehensive Method for Solo Mandolin in Duo-Style, from Entry Level to Artist Level

=== Sheet music ===
- Caprice # 1 for Solo Mandolin
- 1812 Fantasy, for Solo Mandolin in Duo-Style
- Joyful Variations on a Theme of Beethoven, for Solo Mandolin in Duo-Style
- Ave Maria, by Franz Schubert, arranged for Solo Mandolin in Duo-Style
- Pastorale, by G. F. Handel, arranged for Solo Mandolin in Duo-Style
- Maria, Mari!, by Eduardo DiCapua, arranged for Solo Mandolin in Duo-Style
