= Seth Weeks =

African-American musician (1868–1953)

- Weeks in 1900
- Born: September 8, 1868; Vermont, Illinois, U.S.
- Died: December 1953 (aged 84–85)
- Occupations: Composer and musician
- Relatives: Fay E. Allen (daughter)

Silas Seth Weeks (September 8, 1868 – December 1953) was an American composer who played mandolin, violin, banjo and guitar. Although he played many instruments he concentrated professionally on the mandolin. He is considered to be the first African American to play mandolin during its golden period and was considered instrumental in bringing the mandolin to the prominent national standing that it had in the early 1900s. He was the first American known to write a mandolin concerto (in 1900) and led a mandolin and guitar orchestra in Tacoma, Washington.

== Biography ==
Weeks was born in Vermont, Illinois. One of his musical goals was to make the mandolin independent of other instruments, and his playing emphasized the duo style, a way of playing in which the mandolin takes the melody, counter melody and harmonic parts all at once. Properly done, duo style produces what sounds like "two or more instruments" instead of only one. A review of his music by Lyon and Healy of Chicago indicated success, saying that he had included harmony with the melody in most of his arrangements.

He toured America in "circuits" performing and teaching, including in public schools in Chicago, Boston, Salt Lake City, and San Francisco. He also performed in New York City, Philadelphia, Providence, Rhode Island, and internationally in Montreal, Canada.

He composed and arranged as well, performing his own works on tour. He became prominent enough that he was able to tour Europe (England, France and Russia) and live there periodically. He settled temporarily in Europe, living first in London until World War I, when he returned with his family to New York and played in jazz bands. When he returned to Europe in 1920, he went to France, playing at the Apollo in Paris. His place of death is unknown, but was reported in the January 9, 1954, edition of the New York Amsterdam News, on page 9.

He was an admirer of the performances of America's other mandolinists of his day, Samuel Siegel, W. Eugene Page, Valentine Abt, J. W. Marler, W. L. Barney (a Chicago musician in the 1890s–1920s), and Fred Lewis.

== Recordings ==
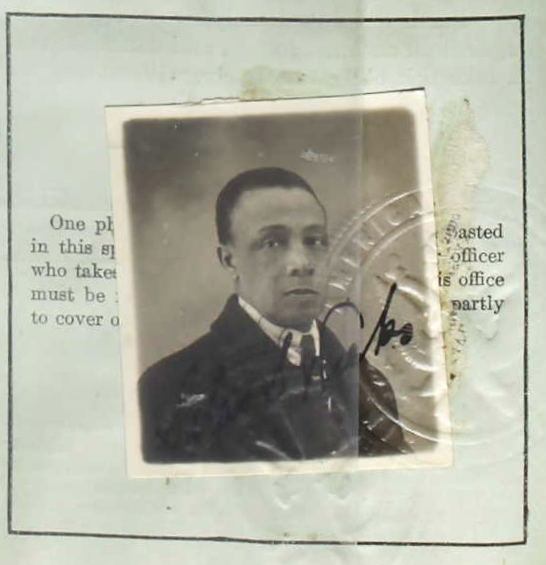
Weeks in 1922

Weeks made recordings with Edison Records in London and with Berliner Gramophone in Berlin while touring Europe. His recordings are mostly unknown or lost today and are available on compact disk only as part of box set about Black-people who made music in Europe. Recordings which have survived include:

(Record companies and dates come from a list of lost music published by the Library of Congress National Recording Preservation Board, and not from the Black Europe compact disk set.)

- Poet And Peasant
- Concert Polka (Pioneer/Columbia/Edison) (1901/1903/1904)
- Handicap March (Pioneer/Edison Bell/Pathe) (1901/1903/1904)
- Georgia Camp Meeting (Pioneer/Columbia) (1901/1903)
- Hungarian Dance (Pathe) (1904)
- Poet And Peasant
- Soldiers In The Park (Pioneer) (1903), (Pathe) (1904)

List by the Library of Congress National Recording Preservation Board of recordings feared lost:

- Allegro (Pioneer/Columbia/Edison) (1901/1903)
- The Charlatan March (Berliner) (1900)
- Donauwellen (Pioneer) (1903)
- Jeunesse Doree (Nicole) (1904)
- Laburnum Gavotte (Pioneer/Columbia) (1903)
- Lumbrin' Luke (Columbia) (1904)
- Mazurka de Concert (Pioneer/Edison) (1901/1903)
- Overture (Pioneer/Columbia/Edison) (1903)
- Popular Airs Medley (Pioneer) (1903)
- The Washington Post March (Pioneer/Pathe) (1903/1904)
- Whistling Rufus (Pioneer) (1903)

== Personal life ==
He is the father of Fay E. Allen, an accomplished musician in her own right. Father and daughter would frequently play together with on at least once occasion they were invited to perform before King Gustav of Sweden. She would later become a distinguished music educator and the first African American to serve on the Los Angeles Board of Education.

== See also ==
- List of mandolinists (sorted)
- Mandolins in North America
