= Amberola =

Type of hand-cranked phonograph

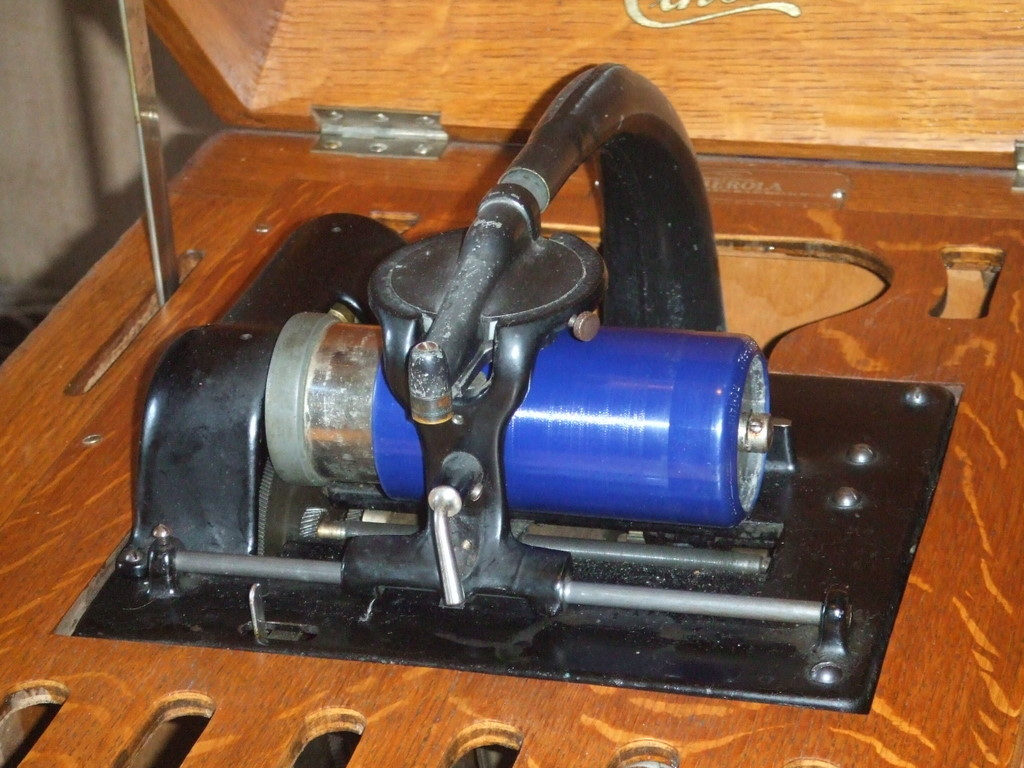
Close-up of the mechanism of an Amberola, manufactured circa 1915

An amberola is a type of hand-cranked phonograph that had an internal rather than external horn. Released in the marketplace in 1908, it used phonograph cylinders, which were placed inside the machine that could play 4-minutes of music. These cylinders were mass-producible, and were the first type of mass produced recordings used by Edison Records. Previously recordings made for Edison's "speaking phonograph" had to be recorded one at a time, and could not be replicated; meaning musicians would have to play for every single individual record made, and that each recording sold would not be the same. The amberola cylinders enabled Edison Records to greatly expand its catalogue of recordings by making it possible to have musicians record one time to produce a large volume of sellable recordings that were identical rather than have to play repeatedly.

The amberola was invented by Thomas Edison as a way to compete with the Victor Talking Machine Company (VTMC), and was in some ways a mimic of that device. The VTMC was the first company to develop a method to mass produce recordings. Instead of cylinders, the VTMC used phonograph records made from rubber. The VTMC had surpassed Edison's earlier phonograph designs not only because of this mass producible model, but because of its aesthetics of an internal rather than external horn. The public preference for internal horns, even though they had inferior sound quality, led Edison to develop his amberola in the same aesthetic fashion as the VTMC in order to be competitive in the marketplace.

In 1912 Edison established Blue Amberol Records (BAR) as the trademark name for the phonograph cylinders played on the amberola. By 1915 the amberola had achieved market dominance as the most popular recording device. The device continued to sell well until the rise of radio changed popular tastes, and BAR went out of business in 1929.
