= Valentine Abt =

American composer

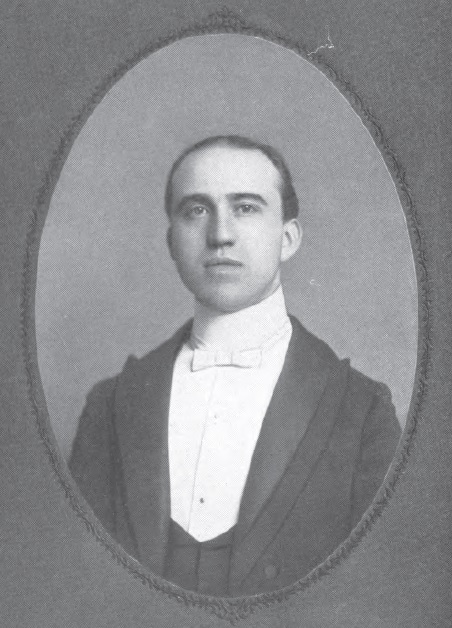
Abt in 1902

Valentine Abt plays Angel's Serenade.
Recording of Valentine Abt on mandolin.

Valentine Abt (born Pittsburgh June 13, 1873 – died Mayview, Pennsylvania July 16, 1942) was an American composer who specialized in the mandolin. In the book Popular American Composers, Frank L. Boyden named Abt one of America's most "prominent specialists of the mandolin", saying that he should be appreciated in Europe as well as America as "one of the greatest artists of any instrument."

Abt was a proponent of the duo-style of mandolin playing, in which one player plays back and forth between melody, counter-melody and harmony so quickly that it sounds as if two instruments are playing. Boyden credited Abt with founding a musical movement around the duo-style, as well as "trio" and "quartet" styles (that sound like three and four different instruments at once). The golden age of the mandolin around the turn of the 20th-Century included other prominent mandolin players using the style, including Samuel Siegel, W. Eugene Page, and Seth Weeks.

== Recordings ==
Abt recorded with Victor Records:

- Valse brillante Valentine Abt (5/29/1905) (composed by Valentine Abt)
- Angel's serenade Valentine Abt (5/29/1905)
- Sweet memories Valentine Abt and Roy Butin (8/5/1908) (composed by Valentine Abt)
- Manzanillo Valentine Abt and Roy Butin (8/5/1908
- Artist's valse Valentine Abt and Roy Butin (composed by Valentine Abt)
- Evening star Valentine Abt and Roy Butin (8/5/1908)
- Barcarolle Valentine Abt and Roy Butin (8/5/1908)
- Fantasie Valentine Abt and Roy Butin (12/8/1909) (composed by Valentine Abt)
- Sweet memories Abt's Mandolin Orchestra (12/8/1909) (composed by Valentine Abt)

== Biography ==
- The biography of Valentine Abt : mandolin and harp virtuoso, composer, and teacher, 1873-1942 by John L. Abt., 2nd ed., with additions and revisions. Published/Created Fort Lauderdale, Fla. : J.L. Abt; Kensington, Md. : Distributed by Plucked String, 2003. ISBN 0972173668, LCCN 2004560789, LC classification (full) ML419.A12 A63 2003. Includes discography (p. 75-78), bibliographical references (p. 149-153), and index.
- The biography of Valentine Abt : mandolin and harp virtuoso, composer, and teacher, 1873-1942 by John L. Abt. 1st ed., Published/Created Fort Lauderdale, Fla. : J.L. Abt; Kensington, Md. : Distributed by Plucked String, 2002. ISBN 0972173641, LCCN 2003269818, LC classification (full) ML419.A12 A63 2002. Includes discography (p. 70-72), bibliographical references (p. 130-134), and index.

== See also ==
- List of mandolinists (sorted)
