= Indestructible Record Company =

Defunct American music company that sold cylinder records

- Founded: 1906
- Founder: William Messer
- Defunct: 1925
- Status: Defunct
- Genre: Various
- Country of origin: U.S.
- Location: Albany, New York

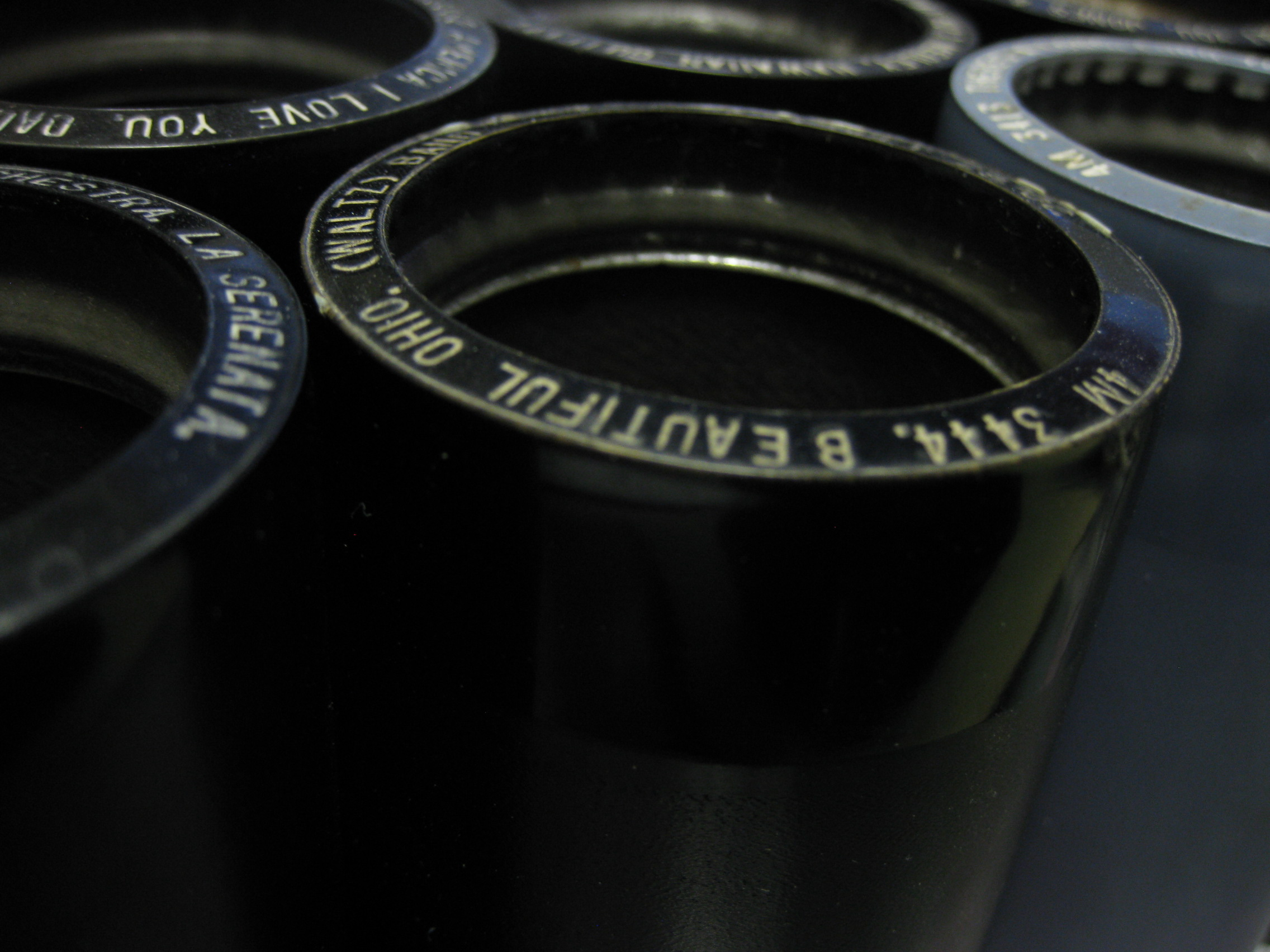
Indestructible cylinder records

Samuel Siegel and Roy Butin play Estillita Waltz.
An example of an Indestructible Record recording from 1908 with Samuel Siegel on mandolin and Roy Butin on guitar.

The Indestructible Record Company was an American record label that produced plastic cylinder records between 1907 and 1922.

The company was established by William Messer, who had worked with Thomas Lambert, the inventor of plastic celluloid cylinder records. In 1900, the records were made by the Lambert Company, but that company went bankrupt in early 1906 after Thomas Edison brought a suit against Lambert for patent infringement. Messer had been responsible for developing a means of mass-producing the Lambert cylinders using a steam press. In 1906 he set up the Indestructible Phonographic Record Co. in Albany, New York, to record and produce them.

The company was also known as the Albany Indestructible Record Company and acquired the patent rights held by Lambert. It produced celluloid cylinders in two-minute and, from 1909, four-minute versions, each having a cardboard core with metal reinforcing rings. Between 1907 and 1922, it produced 1,598 titles, almost all of which have survived. The cylinders are described as "rugged" and "practically immune to splitting".

From 1908 to 1912, the Indestructible Company's output was distributed by Columbia Records. After the arrangement with Columbia ended, the cylinders were sold directly by the firm as well as through Sears, Roebuck and Montgomery Ward retail stores. In 1917 the company was re-organized as the Federal Record Corporation of Albany, New York, which began disc record production in 1919 as the Federal label. After a factory fire in 1922, the company ceased making cylinders, and it formally closed down in 1925.
