= Blue Amberol Records =

Record label

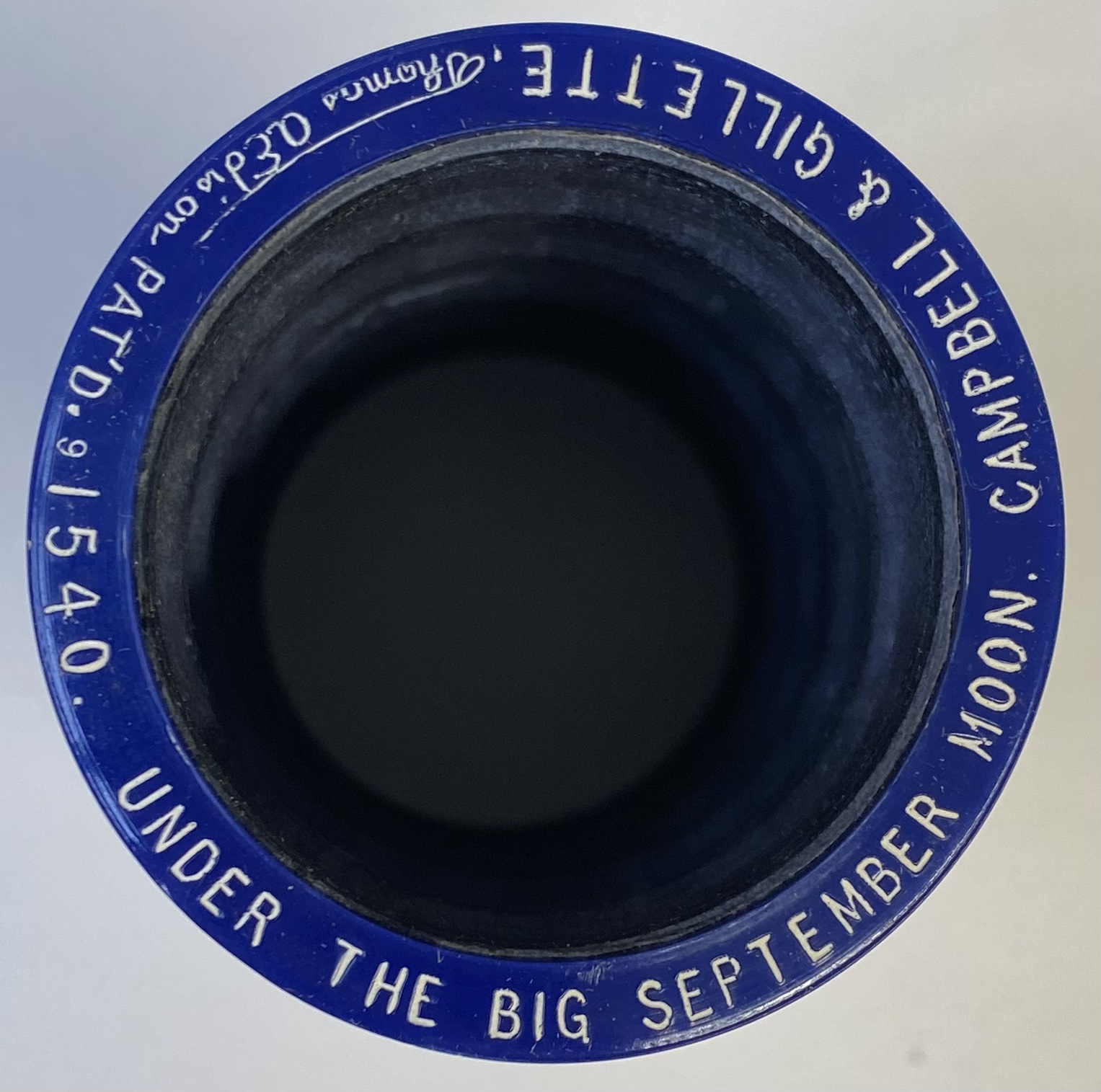
Top of a Blue Amberol Record cylinder

Blue Amberol Records was the trademark name for cylinder records manufactured by Thomas A. Edison, Inc. in the US for the amberola device from 1912 to 1929. They replaced the 4-minute black wax Amberol cylinders introduced in 1908, which had replaced the 2-minute wax cylinders that had been the standard format since the late 1880s. Blue Amberols can play for as long as 4 minutes and 45 seconds and have a surface layer of the "indestructible" plastic celluloid, which Edison tinted a trademark blue color. Edison brand phonographs designed to play Amberol cylinders were named Amberolas.

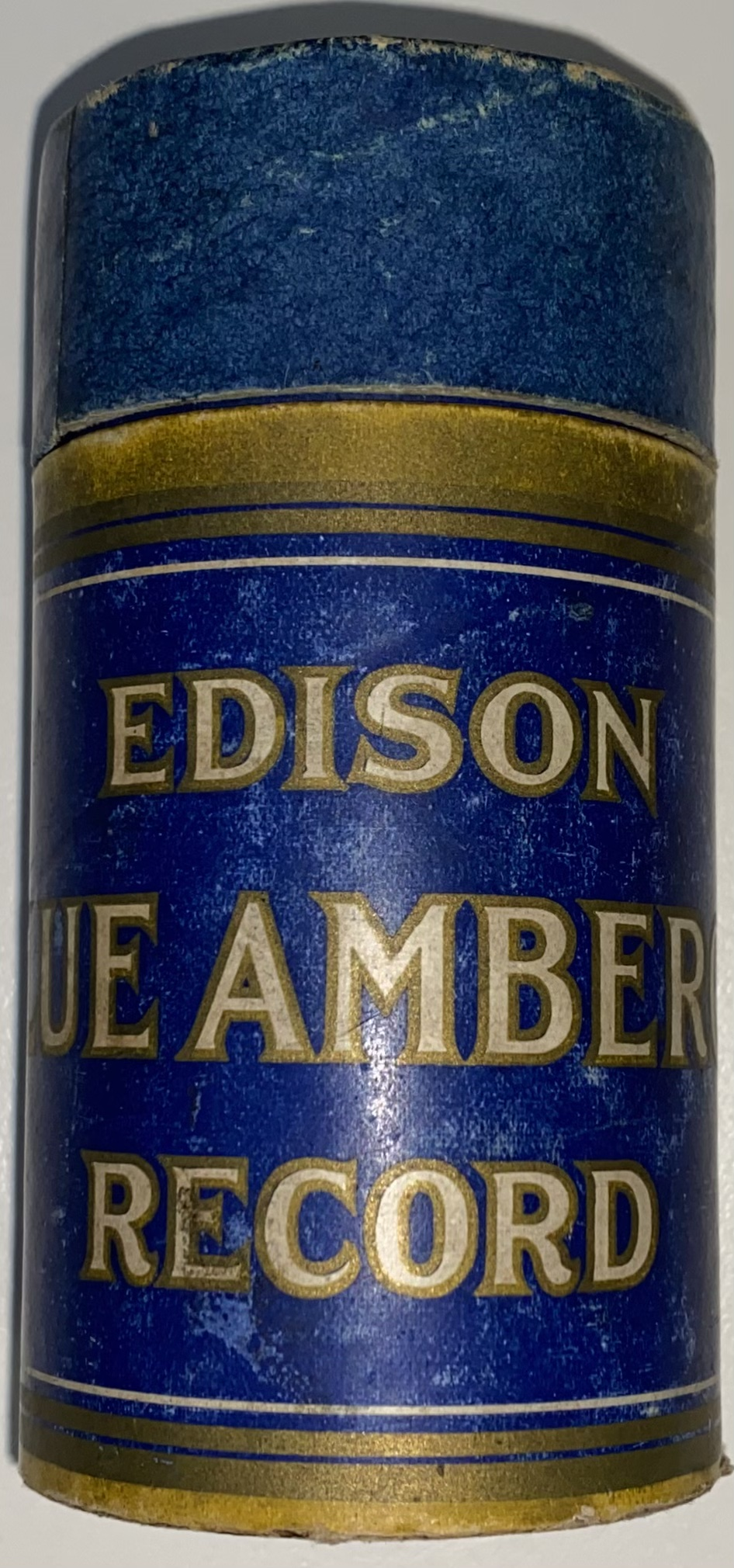
Blue Amberol Record packaging

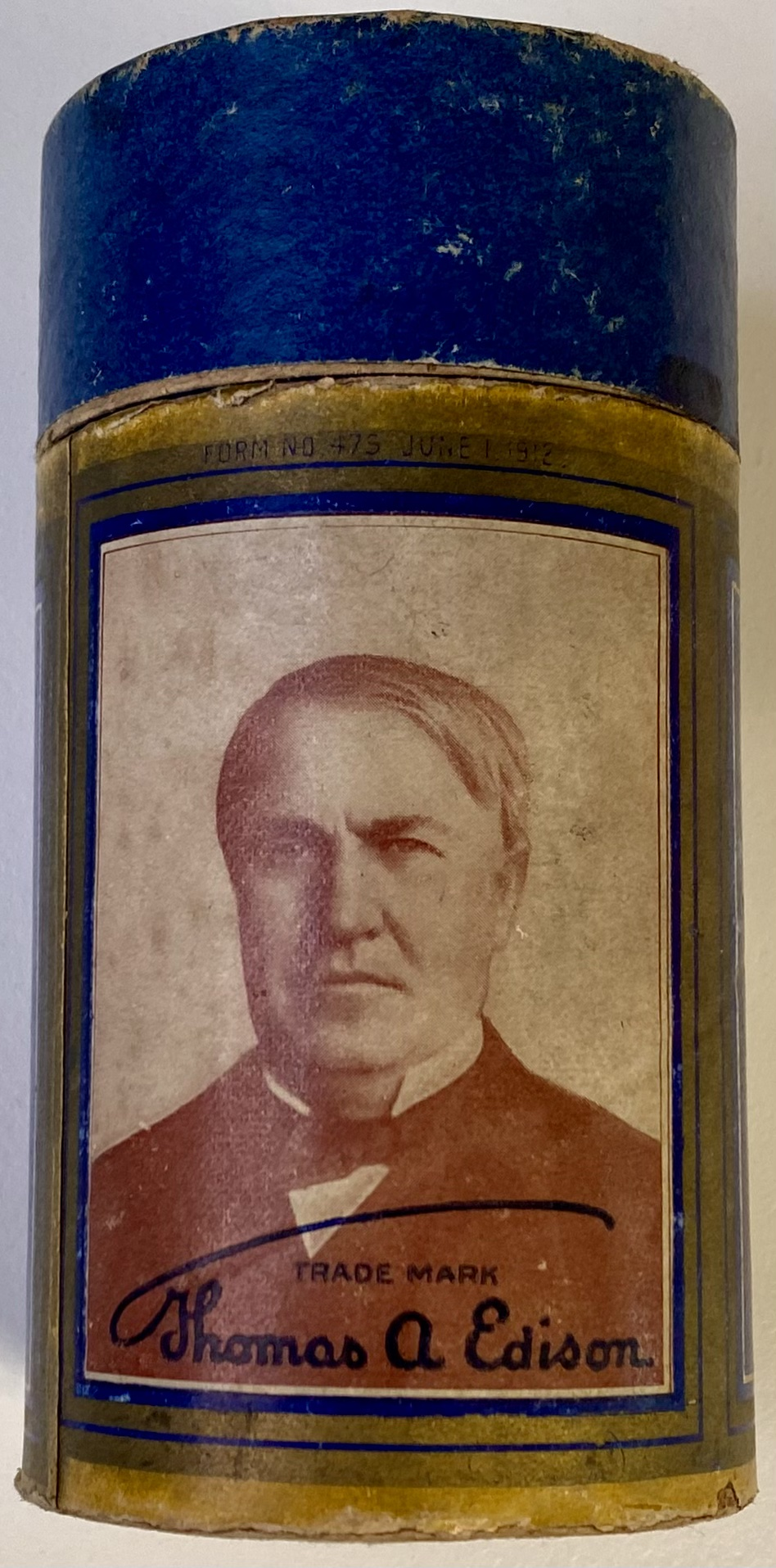

== History ==
=== Edison wax Amberols ===
The four-minute Amberol cylinder made its debut in 1908. Amberols were made of a fragile, black, wax-like compound which was harder than the original 1902 black wax. This Amberol wax was also used for 2-minute standard records from 1908 until the Blue Amberol appeared in 1912. The introduction of the Amberol started a resurgence of interest in cylinder records, but problems soon became apparent. Amberols crack rather easily and could break during playback. Amberols often shattered when they broke, unlike some kinds of 2-minute wax cylinders that would simply crack into a few pieces. Another problem was that wax Amberols wore out too quickly. Some Amberols mistracked or played with a wavering pitch due to uneven shrinkage during the manufacturing process.

=== Edison Blue Amberols ===
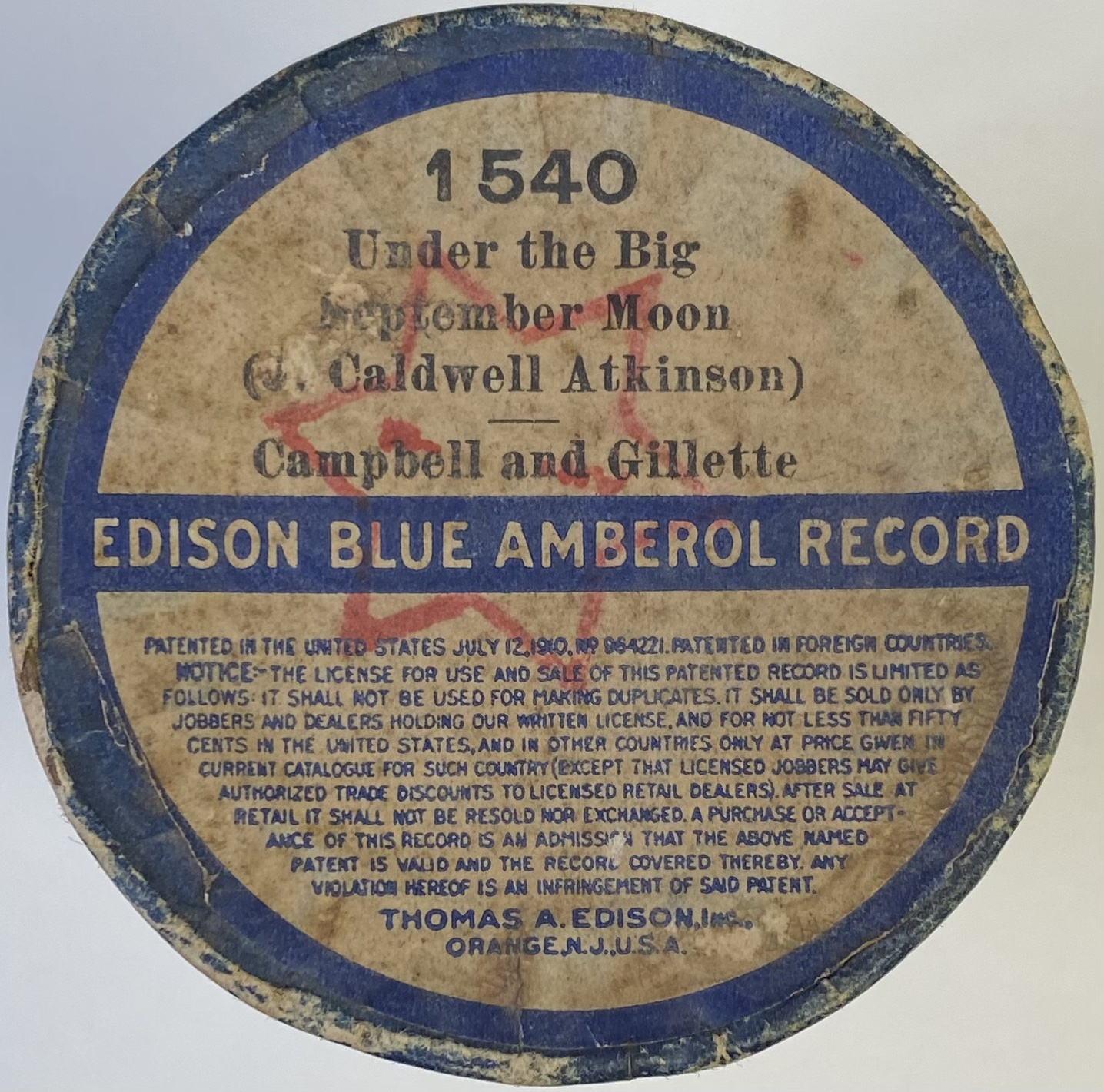
Lid of packaging

By 1912, the shortcomings of the wax Amberol were obvious. Edison, who did not want to pay royalties to Thomas B. Lambert for his celluloid cylinder patent, eventually bought it and changed production over to a thin but tough blue-tinted celluloid reinforced with a plaster of Paris core. The introduction of these "Blue Amberols" helped to hike cylinder sales. The early Blue Amberol releases offered excellent audio quality for their era — better, in fact, than later issues, because from January 1915 onward Thomas A. Edison, Inc., which had been concentrating its efforts on improving the quality of Diamond Disc phonograph records, began to release cylinders which were acoustically dubbed from Diamond Discs. The dubbing technique used was non-electronic (the disc phonograph horn played into the cylinder recording horn) until December 1927, when electronic dubbing was introduced. This resulted in a somewhat hollow "dead" sound on the cylinders compared to the original discs. On many dubbed cylinders, when the cylinder's own 160 rpm surface noise is low enough, 80 rpm disc surface noise can be heard starting up shortly before the music begins.

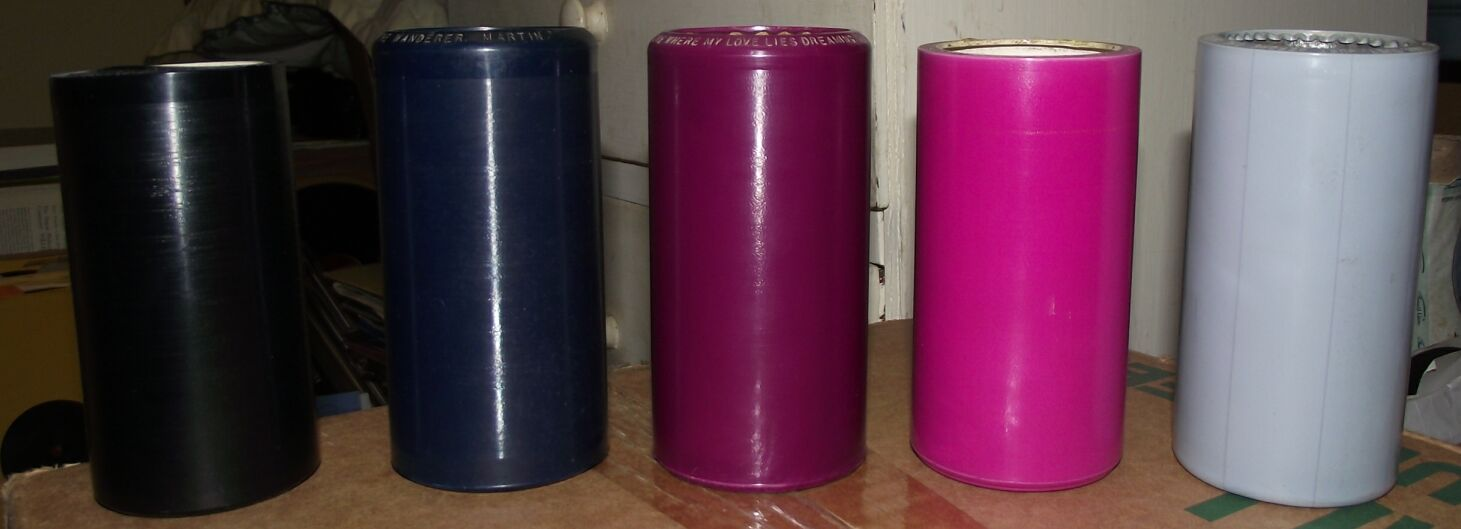
Various phonograph cylinders. The Blue Amberol is second from left

Beyond the main popular and sacred music series, which began with record number 1501 in 1912 and ended with record number 5719 in 1929, Edison offered a special line of prestigious Concert Blue Amberols of opera arias, light classical pieces, and other "cultured" music performed by "name" artists, later supplanted by the distinctively tinted Royal Purple Amberol cylinders. A set of special wax Amberols or Blue Amberols identified by the letters A through H, rather than the more usual numbers, were given away with 4-minute conversion kits sold for updating some earlier 2-minute phonographs. There were Blue Amberol instructional records to accompany the Edison School Phonograph, ICS language courses, Blue Amberols for Morse code training, Blue Amberols for the French and German markets, special 2-minute Blue Amberols for the rural Mexican market, and 6-inch-long (15 cm) dictation instruction cylinders for the Ediphone that were essentially long Blue Amberols and remained in production for many years after the demise of the cylinder format as an entertainment medium.

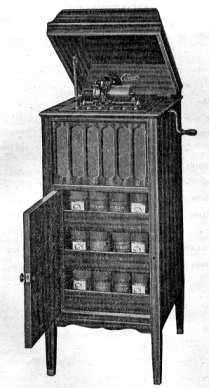
"Amberola 75" phonograph

== Technical ==
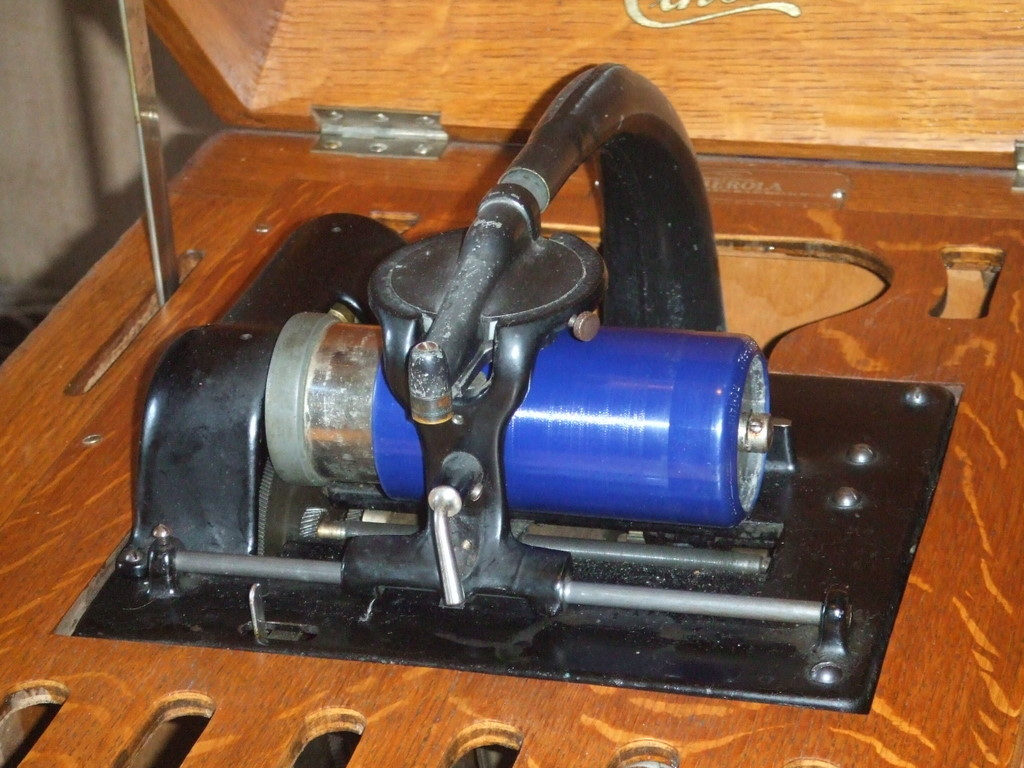
Close-up of the mechanism of an Amberola, manufactured circa 1915

Edison Blue Amberols are made of celluloid on a molded plaster core. The celluloid surface is able to withstand hundreds of playings with only a moderate increase in surface noise if played on a well-maintained machine with a stylus in good condition.

Blue Amberols have a maximum playing time of about 4 minutes and 45 seconds and play at the standard post-1902 cylinder speed of 160 rpm. Like the preceding black wax Amberols, they provide twice the playing time of 2-minute cylinders by using a finer groove with a pitch of 200 lines per inch instead of 100. They cannot be played on older machines set up to play only the earlier standard 2 minute cylinders, as both wax and celluloid Amberols require a smaller stylus tip to fit the finer groove and the worm-gear which moves the stylus over the surface of the cylinder must turn at a different rate. Thomas A. Edison, Inc. sold kits with gear assemblies and reproducers that could be installed by the owner of an older Edison machine so that both standard and 4-minute records could be played. The Edison company also marketed new models capable of playing both. With these combination machines the operator needed to adjust a knob or lever that shifted gears and make sure the correct reproducing stylus was in position when switching from one record type to the other.

Internal horn Edison phonographs designed to play 4-minute cylinders were called Amberolas. The earliest Amberola model, the 1909 Amberola IA, was equipped with selectable 2 and 4-minute gearing, and after initially being sent out fitted with an unmarked Model "L" reproducer with a flattened fishtail weight that was recalled almost immediately as being "unsatisfactory", was refitted with the Model "M" reproducer with flip-over 2 and 4-minute sapphire styli for playing wax cylinders. There is at least one known example of an early Model M reproducer also fitted with a flattened fishtail weight.

Upon the introduction of Blue Amberols in 1912, the M reproducer was supplanted by the Diamond A reproducer, which was designed for playing only celluloid cylinders. Its small-tipped conical diamond stylus and increased stylus pressure would seriously damage wax cylinders. External horn Edison phonographs were available with the Diamond B reproducer. Several other Amberola models less expensive than the IA (and later the 4-minute-only IB and III) were available, such as the V, VI, and X.

After an Edison factory fire in December 1914, the Amberola line was simplified in both mechanical and cabinet design, resulting in the 4-minute-only Amberola 30, 50, and 75, each model number indicating the initial retail price in dollars. They were equipped with the Diamond C reproducer. The 4-minute-only external horn Opera (later renamed Concert) model of 1911-1912, which used the same mechanism as the IB and III, was initially fitted with the Model L reproducer, which had an elliptical sapphire stylus for playing wax Amberols, but after the introduction of Blue Amberols it shipped with the Diamond A reproducer.

== Archival storage of cylinders ==
Samuel Siegel and Roy Butin play Gavotte.
A 1909 Edison Amberol recording of Samuel Siegel on mandolin and Roy Butin on guitar, preserved and digitized as part of the Cylinder Preservation and Digitization Project at the University of California, Santa Barbara.

The "Amberol" plastic is on a plaster of Paris core. This core is proving to be problematic for the long-term survival of Blue Amberol Records, as the plaster often tends to expand over the decades, especially if exposed to moisture or kept in humid conditions. In moderate cases, swollen plaster can make the record not fit properly on the phonograph mandrel (this can be fairly easily remedied by gently reaming out the plaster to restore the correct inner diameter) or can warp the cylinder out of round, making it not play properly. In worse cases, the expanding plaster will crack or split the plastic playing surface, rendering the record unusable. Freezing causes any moisture in the plaster to expand but makes the celluloid contract, a combination which can cause the celluloid to split lengthwise very abruptly.

The Blue Amberol plastic is nitrocellulose and therefore flammable. Being an organic plastic, celluloid is subject to chemical decomposition, but acute deterioration, as seen in nitrate film reels, has so far rarely if ever been observed in Blue Amberols or other (e.g., Lambert, Albany Indestructible, and US Everlasting) celluloid cylinders.

== See also ==
- List of record labels
- List of Edison Blue Amberol Records: Popular Series
