= Roy Butin =

American recording artist

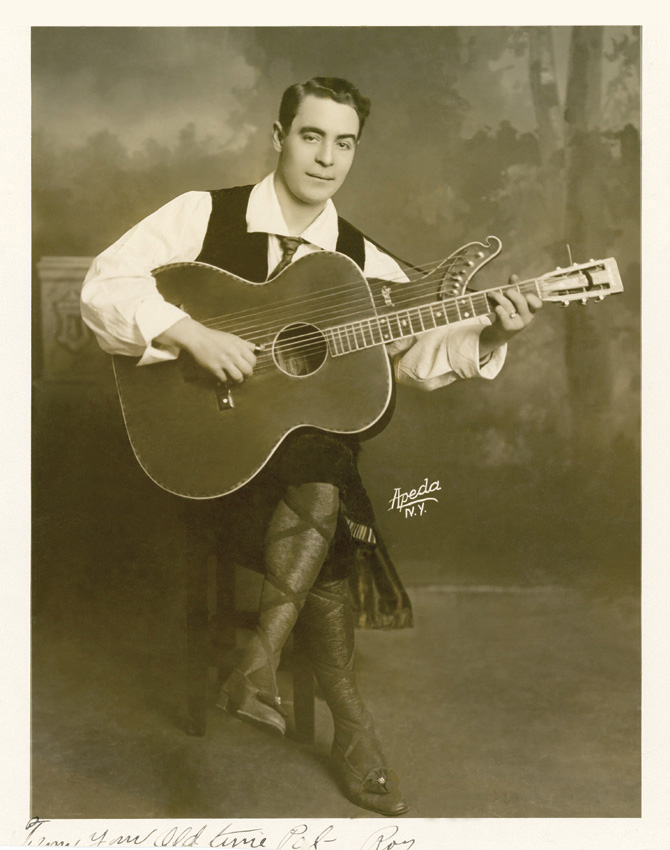
Roy Hunter Butin with his harp guitar, New York, 1909.

Roy Hunter Butin (October 30, 1876, in Logan, Ohio – August 16, 1943, in Long Beach, California) was an American recording artist in the early 20th century, known for his playing of the harp guitar. He recorded more than a dozen early cylinder and 78 rpm records. From at least 1906 to 1916, he performed as one half of The Olivotti Troubadours with Michael Banner. Artists he recorded with also included Samuel Siegel, Valentine Abt, and W. Eugene Page.

Contrary to popular belief, he was not part of the Ossman-Dudley Trio, which featured Vess Ossman on banjo, Audley Dudley on mandolin and George Dudley on harp guitar.

Roy was married twice. His first marriage to Florence McPhail, in April 1898, ended in divorce before 1900. His second marriage was to an actress, Elsie Clare Sanford, in September 1912. That marriage ended in divorce in July 1925. His last relationship was with his housekeeper, Emma Oldham. No marriage is recorded, but it appears they did live together.

== Recordings ==
Samuel Siegel and Roy Butin play Gavotte.
A 1909 Edison Amberol recording of Samuel Siegel on mandolin and Roy Butin on guitar.

Samuel Siegel and Roy Butin play Estillita Waltz.
An example of an Indestructible Record Company recording from 1908 with Samuel Siegel on mandolin and Roy Butin on guitar.

Butin recorded 10 records with Victor Records in 1908.

- Estellita waltz (with Samuel Siegel)
- American valor march (with Samuel Siegel)
- In Fairyland (with Samuel Siegel)
- Sweet memories (with Valentine Abt)
- Manzanillo (with Valentine Abt)
- Artist's valse (with Valentine Abt)
- Evening star (with Valentine Abt)
- Barcarolle (with Valentine Abt)
- Fantasie (with Valentine Abt)
- Polka scherzo (with W. Eugene Page)

Other recordings include:

- Gavotte Caprice (with Samuel Siegel on mandolin) 1909
- Sugar Plum (with Samuel Siegel on mandolin) 1909
- Carnival of Venice (the Ollivotti Troubadours: Michael Banner, violin and Roy H. Butin, (harp) guitar) 1909
- Waltz (Waltz Caprice)(with Samuel Siegel on mandolin) 1909
- Mobile Prance (with W. Eugene Page on mandolin) 9/21/1909
- Polka Scherzo (with W. Eugene Page on mandolin) 9/21/1909
