= Classical Mandolin Society of America =

The Classical Mandolin Society of America Inc., or CMSA, is a 501 (C)(3) not for profit corporation committed to promoting the playing and study of mandolin instruments in the United States. The organization was founded in 1986 by Norman Levine.

The organization works to promote knowledge and interest in the mandolin family of fretted instruments; (mandolin, mandola, mandocello, mando-bass) and guitar, with a focus on Classical Mandolin. It actively sponsors grants and scholarships for mandolin education and instruction for children and adults in North America. Currently, there are over 400 members worldwide. The CMSA holds a Convention in a different city in North America each year. Among other functions, the CMSA Convention hosts an En Masse Orchestra, which for its brief existence each year, is the largest mandolin orchestra in the United States, and has historically included as many as 180 musicians. The CMSA serves as a source of information about how to find or create mandolin ensembles around the United States, Canada and the world.

The organization is staffed by unpaid volunteers and is structured with officers of the corporation (president, vice president, secretary and treasurer), and a board of directors, which currently has nine members. The CMSA membership votes on candidates to fill officer and board member positions in accordance with its bylaws.

The CMSA publishes a quarterly newsletter, The Mandolin Journal, which contains legal notifications for the corporation and current organizational news, along with contributed articles and music. The organization also maintains an internet website that contains information on the organization and its activities, membership application forms and convention registration forms.
