= W. Eugene Page =

American performing artist

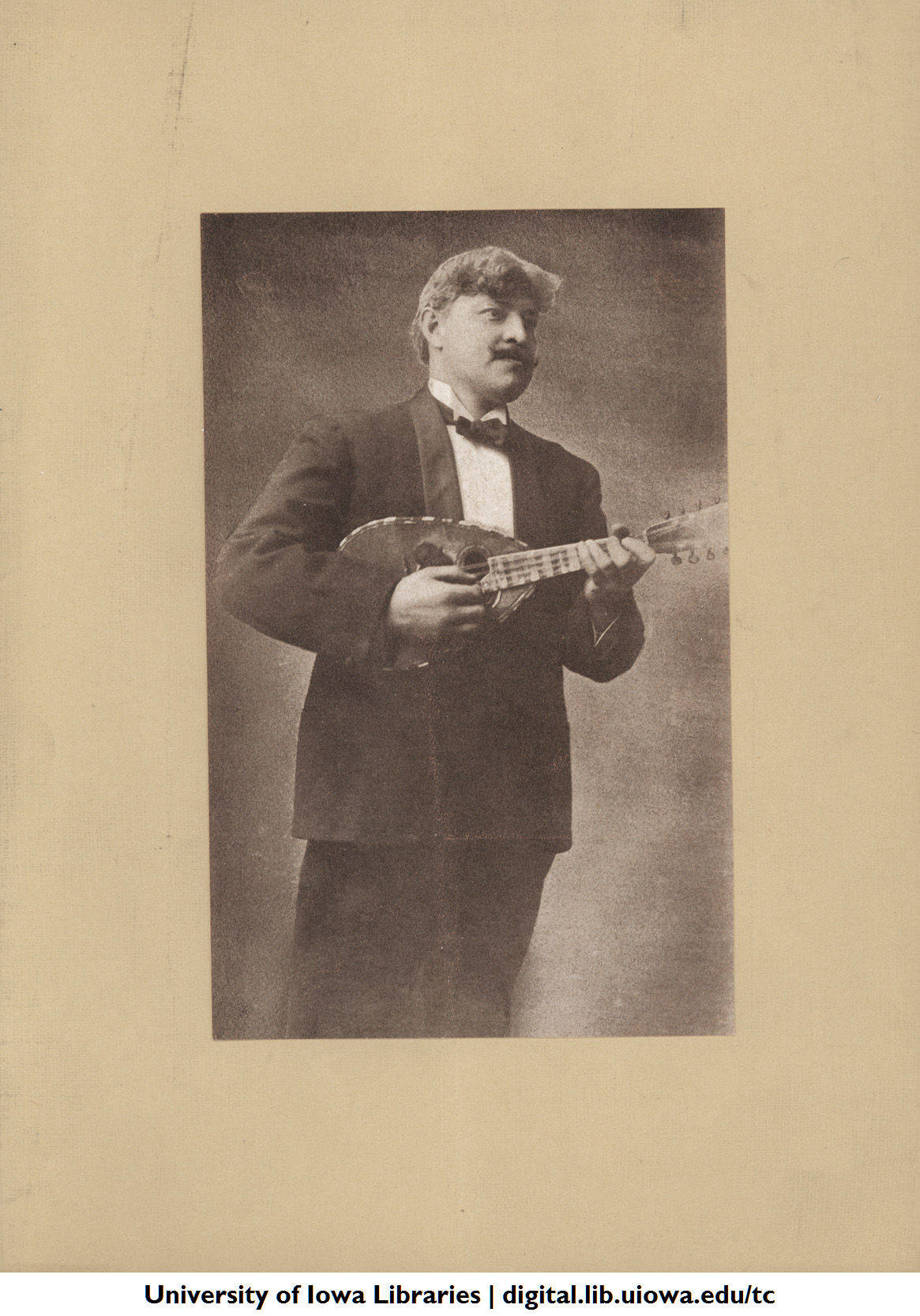
W. Eugene Page, 1908 from a Chautauqua brochure.

Walter Eugene Page (13 May 1876 – 26 May 1922) was an early 20th-century American performing artist who made records with Victor. He was considered a virtuoso on the mandolin, and played marimbaphone, banjo and mandola as well.

He toured with his performing company, The Eugene Page concert company, as part of the Chautauqua movement. Members included Page on mandolin; Florence Phelps McCune also on mandolin; Emma McDonald, violincello, and Signor Innocenrio Zito, harp.

== Recordings ==
1897 advertisement by Lyon and Healy in The Church magazine. The advertisement mentions prominent mandolin players of the time: Salvatore Tomaso (Tomaso's Mandolin Orchestra, Chicago), Arling Shaeffer (author of Elite Mandolin Instructor published Chicago by Lyon and Healy Jan. 1, 1891), Arthur Wells (on Chautauqua circuit), Best, H. P. Sutorius (Minneapolis), W. L. Hazen (Hazen's Mandolin Orchestra, Chicago), Bouton, Turney, and Page as helping Lyon and Healy to improve their 1897 Washburn mandolin.

Page made 5 commercial recordings with Victor Records

- La della (W. Eugene Page mandolin; D. F. Ramseyer harp guitar)
- Mobile prance (W. Eugene Page mandolin; D. F. Ramseyer harp guitar)
- Tipica polka (W. Eugene Page mandolin; D. F. Ramseyer harp guitar. Composed by Carlo Curti.
- Mobile prance (Roy Butin harp guitar; W. Eugene Page mandolin)
- Polka scherzo (Roy Butin harp guitar; W. Eugene Page mandolin
