= Samuel Siegel =

American mandolin virtuoso and composer

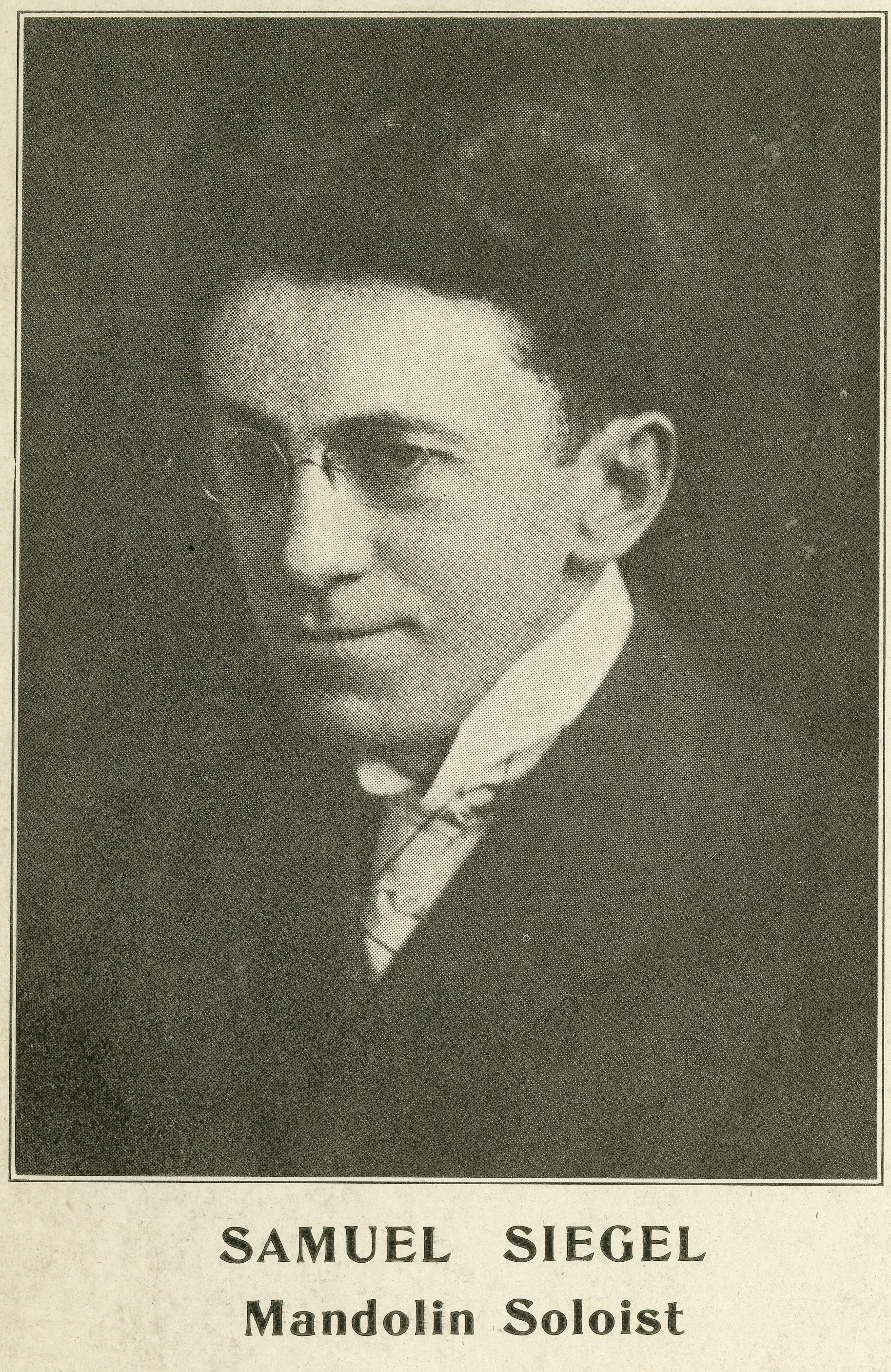
Samuel Siegel, from a 1918 tour with William Foden and Frederick J. Bacon

Samuel Siegel (born 1875, Des Moines, Iowa — died January 14, 1948, Los Angeles, California) was an American mandolin virtuoso and composer who played mandolin on 29 records for Victor Records, including 9 pieces of his own composition and two that he arranged. Siegel was the first mandolinist to record on Emile Berliner's phonograph disk-records. He was labeled "America's Greatest Mandoline Virtuoso" and "The King of the Mandolin" in the May 1900 Banjo World.

Siegel performed both in vaudeville, as well as in concert halls. He had no formal training in music, but saw that the mandolin needed original music, rather than relying on the transcribed violin music. His compositions and arrangements were well known in his day.

He was the author of Siegel's Special Mandolin Studies, published by Joseph W. Stern & Co., 1901, in which he covered left-hand Pizzicato and harmonic duo style.

== Recording partners ==
Siegel recorded with Roy Butin in 1908 on four Victor records, the tunes: Southern Fantasy, Estellita Waltz, American Valor March, and In Fairyland.

Samuel Siegel and Roy Butin play Gavotte
A 1909 Edison Amberol recording of Samuel Siegel on mandolin and Roy Butin on guitar

He recorded Edison Diamond Disk record Ragtime Echoes in 1918 with Marie Caveny, with her on ukulele, and also Dance, Mouse Dance, and Medley. Marie and her husband James Frank Caveny lived with Siegel as lodgers in Chicago during the 1910 United States Census. They were performers or lecturers in the Lyceum movement. James Franklin was a cartoonist and Marie sang soprano in their performance.

Samuel Siegel and Marie Caveny play Ragtime Echoes, one of Siegel's compositions, recorded on an Edison Diamond Disk record
A 1918 recording with Samuel Siegel on mandolin and Marie Caveny on ukulele

== Victor recordings ==
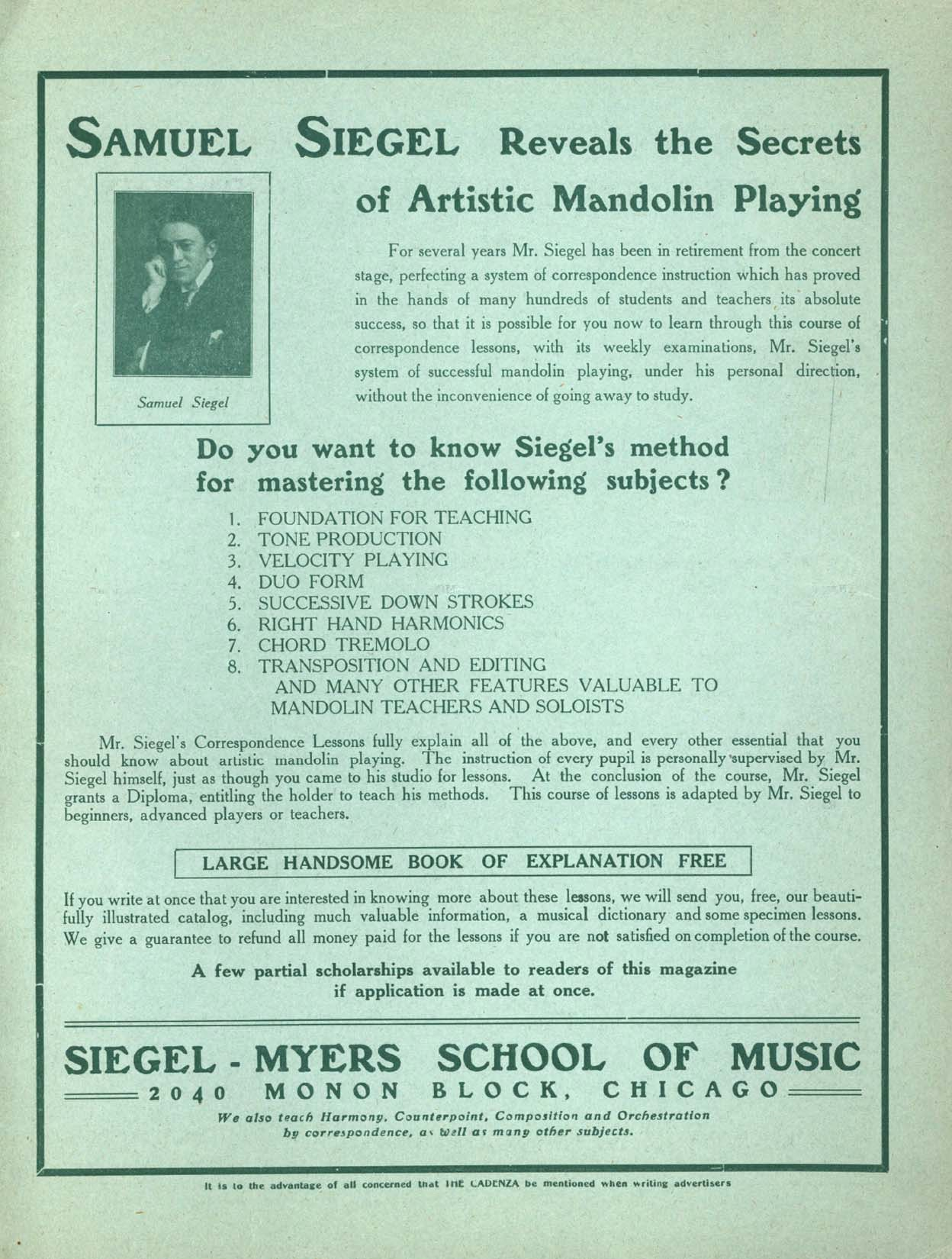
1911 advertisement from The Cadenza for a class taught by Samuel Siegel

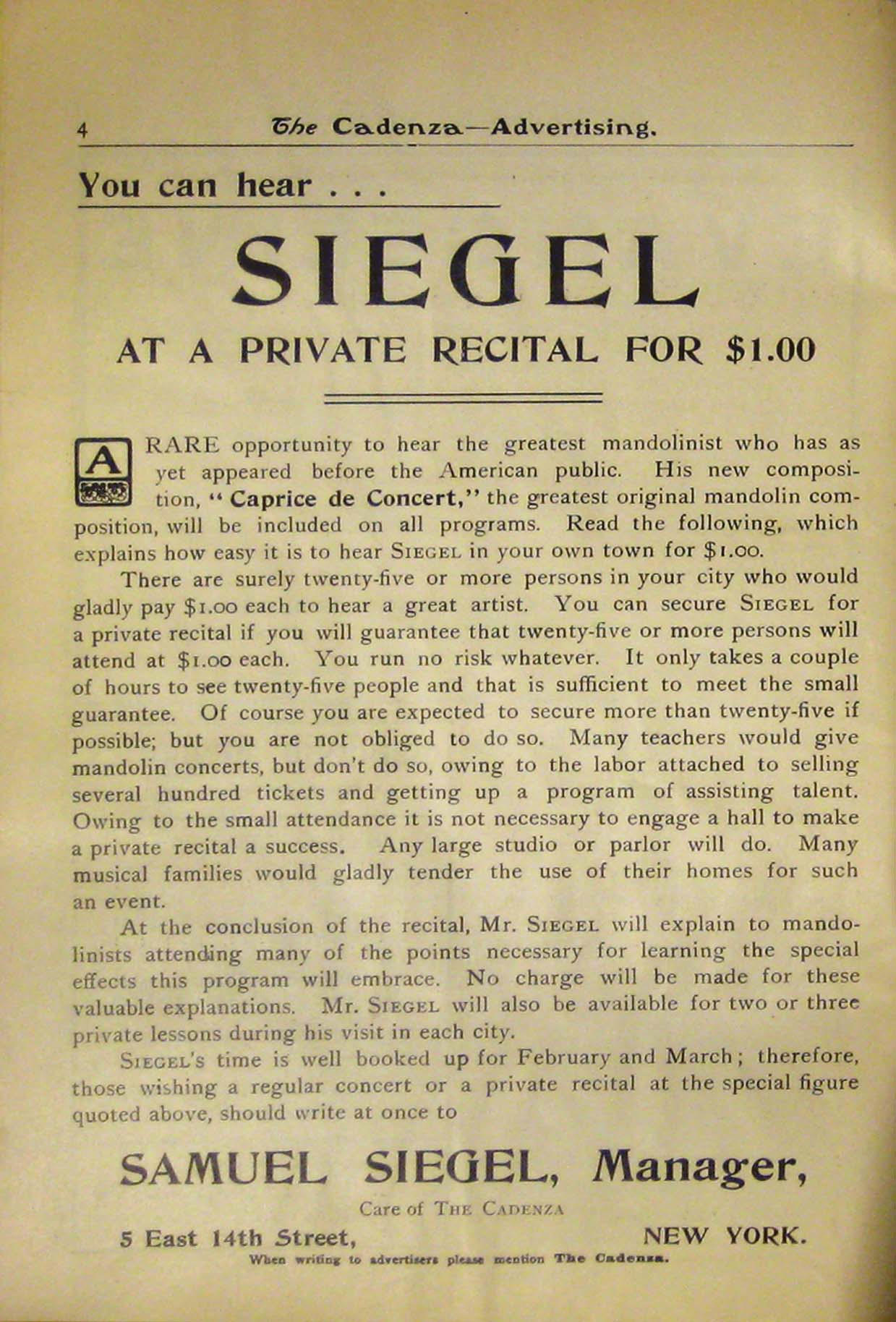
1902 advertisement for Samuel Siegel

Recorded for Victor records between October 20, 1900 and December 28, 1918.

- The foxhunters two-step
- Espagnole waltz
- Hawthorne club
- Remembrance of thee
- Medley of coon songs
- Ma lady Lou
- Volunteer patrol
- American valor march
- La bonita waltz
- Romance
- In olden times
- Nearer my God to thee
- Manzanillo
- An autumn evening
- A-sa-ma
- Maritana mazurka
- Navajo medley
- La cinquantaine
- Träumerei
- Intermezzo
- The whirlwind march
- Boston Ideal march
- Estellita waltz
- American valor march
- In Fairyland
- Medley, (December 28, 1918) with Marie Caveny (ukulele)
- Dance, (December 28, 1918) with Marie Caveny (ukulele)
- Ragtime echoes, (December 28, 1918) with Marie Caveny (ukulele)
- Mouse dance, (December 28, 1918) with Marie Caveny (ukulele)

== Columbia Records ==
He made records for Columbia Records.

- La bonita waltz (1901), Samuel Siegel (mandolin)
- Zenda waltz (1901), Samuel Siegel (mandolin)
- Hawthorne Club (c 1904-1909), Samuel Siegel (mandolin)
- Ivanhoe Intermezzo with Geo. Stehl & Hans Von Wegern
- Mazurka Brillante

== Edison recordings ==
He recorded for Edison Records on their Blue Amberol, Gold Moulded, and Diamond Disk albums.

=== Gold Molded ===
- Home, sweet home (1902), Samuel Siegel (mandolin)
- Manzanilo (c. 1902), Samuel Siegel (mandolin)
- The story teller waltz (1903), Samuel Siegel (mandolin)
- My Old Kentucky Home (1903), Samuel Siegel (mandolin)
- Just One Girl (1904), Samuel Siegel (mandolin)(Music written by Lynn Udall, 1898)
- An autumn evening (1905), Samuel Siegel (mandolin) and M. Loyd Wolf (guitar)
- Evening on the plaza (1905), Samuel Siegel (mandolin)
- How Can I Leave Thee (#8968) - His name is announced as mandolinist., Samuel Siegel (mandolin)

=== Blue Amberol ===
- Castilian Echoes (1908), Samuel Siegel (mandolin) and William Smith (guitar)
- Waltz (1909), Samuel Siegel (mandolin) and Roy H. Butin (guitar)
- Gavotte (1909), Samuel Siegel (mandolin) and Roy H. Butin (guitar)
- Waltz (1913), Samuel Siegel (mandolin) and Roy H. Butin (guitar)
- Kuu ipo i ka hee pue one medley (1919), Samuel Siegel (mandolin) and Marie Caveny (ukulele)

=== Diamond ===
- Ragtime Echoes (1918), Samuel Siegel (mandolin) and Marie Caveny (ukulele)

== Indestructible Records ==
He made records marketed by the Indestructible Record Company.

- Estellita waltz (1908), Samuel Siegel (mandolin) and Roy Butin (guitar)
- Southern fantasie (1908), Samuel Siegel (mandolin) and Roy Butin (guitar)

== See also ==
- List of mandolinists (sorted)
