= Partee =

Partee is a surname. Notable people with the surname include:

- Barbara Partee (born 1940), American semanticist
- Cecil A. Partee (1921–1994), American politician
- Clarence L. Partee (1864–1915), American composer, arranger and music publisher
- Dennis Partee (born 1946), American football player
- Roy Partee (1917–2000), American baseball player
