= BMG movement =

Musical genre

The November 1903 of BMG magazine, first published by Clifford Essex in London.

The Banjo, Mandolin and Guitar (BMG) movement is a music genre based on the family of fretted stringed instruments played with a plectrum or fingers, with or without fingerpicks. The instruments include the banjo, mandolin and guitar. This became popular in the US in the late 19th century and into the 20th century. It fell from favour in the 1930s but there is still an organised movement in the UK where the BMG, founded in 1903, is the country's oldest music periodical still publishing. In the United States, a major magazine for the movement was The Cadenza magazine, published by Clarence L. Partee.

== Images ==
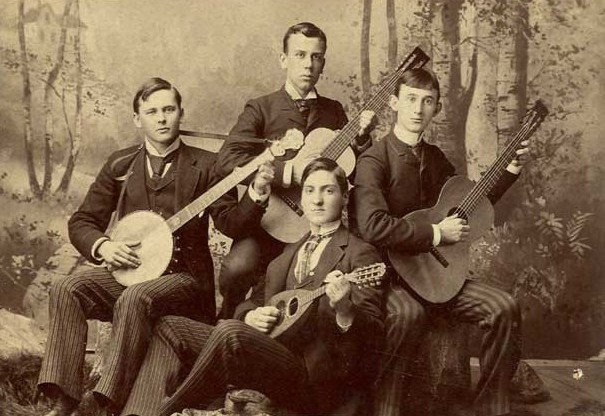
The Banjo, Mandolin & Guitar Club at Washington & Jefferson College in the 1890s

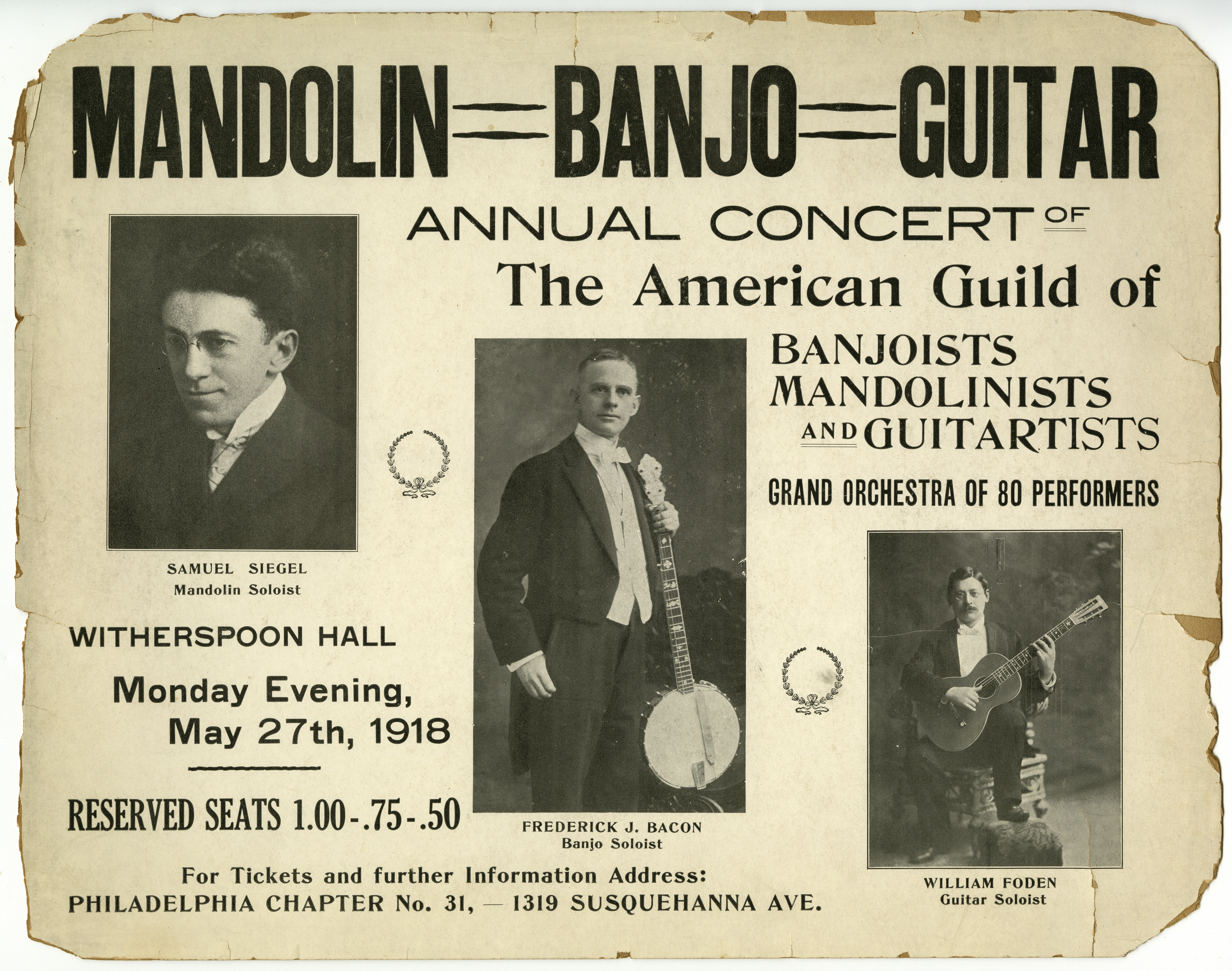
Advertisement for the American Guild of banjoists, mandoliniists and guitarists, 1918. It featured prominent instrumentalists of the movement, mandolinist Samuel Siegel, banjoist Frederick J. Bacon and guitarist William Foden.
