= William Foden =

American musical artist (1860-1947)

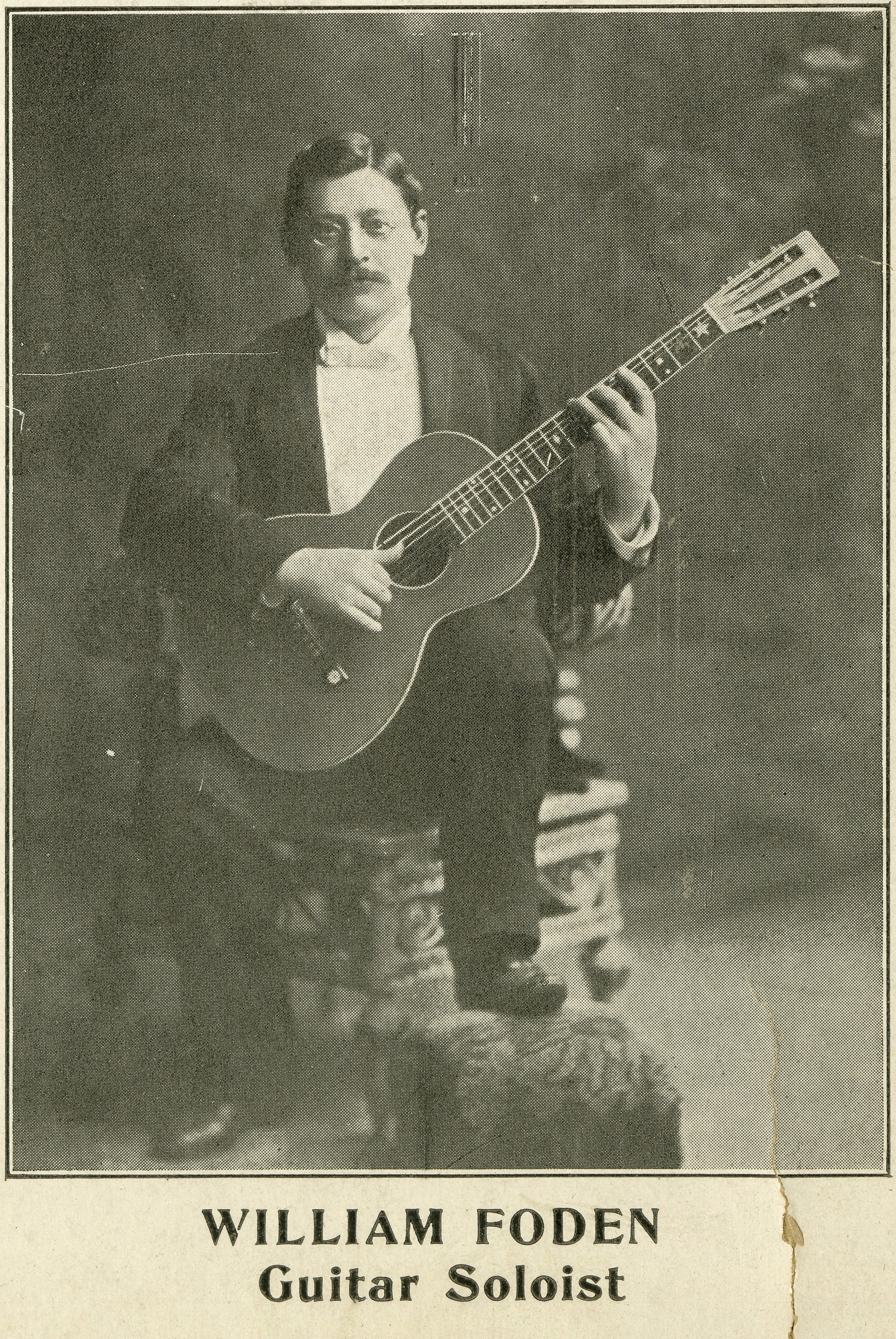
- William Foden, 1918.

Background information
- Born: March 23, 1860; St. Louis, Missouri, U.S.
- Died: April 9, 1947 (aged 87)
- Genre: Classical
- Occupations: Musician, composer, teacher
- Instrument: Guitar
- Years active: 1880–1940

William Foden (23 March 1860 – 9 April 1947) was an American composer, musician, and teacher. Foden is considered America's premiere classical guitarist during the 1890s and the first decades of the twentieth century.

== Life ==
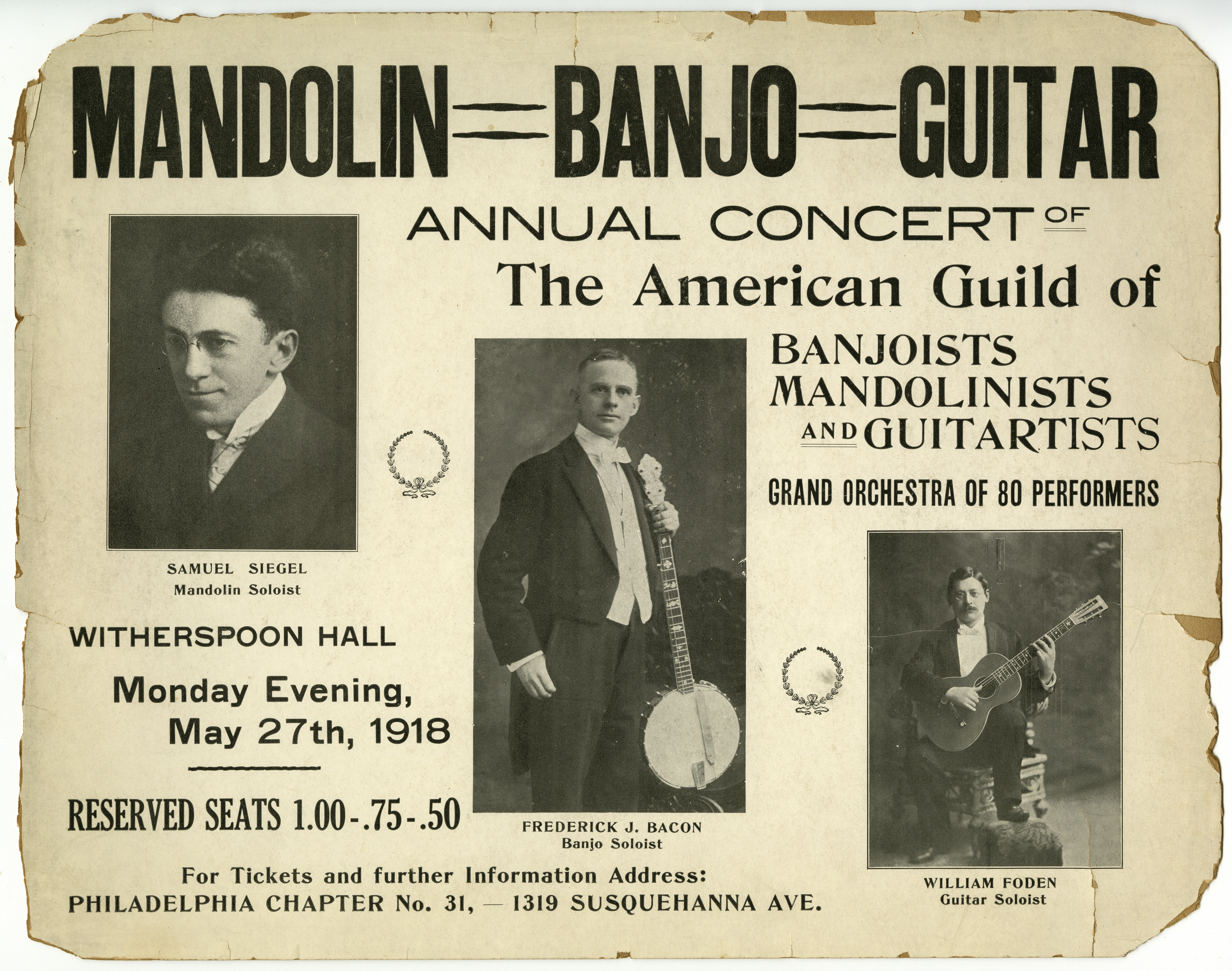
Advertisement for the American Guild of banjoists, mandolinists and guitarists, 1918. It featured prominent instrumentalists of the movement, mandolinist Samuel Siegel, banjoist Frederick J. Bacon and guitarist William Foden.

Foden was born in St. Louis, Missouri and initially started with the violin at age 7, changing from age 16 to the mandolin and classical guitar. He studied guitar with William O. Bateman (1825–1883), "a successful lawyer, music engraver, guitarist, and nationally recognized guitar composer" By the age of sixteen, he became the head of the local mandolin orchestra. His professional career began in the 1880s, gaining national notoriety from the early 1890s. "Having an aversion to traveling and leaving his family, he did not fully capitalize on his growing fame" until 1904, when he was invited to play at Carnegie Hall for the 3rd annual convention of the American Guild of Banjoists, Mandolinists and Guitarists.

In 1911, Foden and his family moved to Englewood, New Jersey, near New York City, after a successful eight-month tour of the United States and British Columbia together with Giuseppe Pettine (mandolin) and Frederick Bacon (banjo), with newspapers referring to them as "The Big Trio". From Englewood, he commuted to New York City where he taught guitar and other fretted instruments at a studio at 42nd Street. For the publisher Wm. J. Smith he arranged numerous works for mandolin orchestra, guitar, banjo, ukulele, and Hawaiian steel guitar. His Grand Guitar Method in two volumes (1920, 1921) contains numerous original compositions, in addition to nearly 50 solo compositions published independently. He also left more than a hundred compositions and arrangements in manuscript.

Foden is quoted in Washburn and Lyon & Healy catalogs from 1892 to the early 1900s. Within he states, "For an absolutely correct scale, ease in playing, volume and purity of tone, I consider that the Washburn instruments have no equal." However, he began ordering Martin guitars for himself and his students at the beginning of the century. "Foden Special" models were designed between the years of 1912 and 1917, through the collaboration between the Martin company and Foden.

== Music ==
According to Back (2007), Foden's works may be divided into two categories, a) light popular compositions in established dance forms such as waltzes, marches, polkas, primarily written to provide an income, and b) virtuoso original compositions, including works with theme and variations and often in an extended form, to suit as showpieces in his own performances. Stylistically, he followed older European composers such as Sor, Mertz, and Zani de Ferranti, but Foden is always original in his inventive modulations and unusual choice of keys. He was especially famous for his extraordinary tremolo technique.

== Selected works ==
All for (classical) guitar. Dates are for publications, not necessarily for composition.

- Celebrated Diamond Clog (1887)
- Flower Girl Schottische (1887)
- Il Grande (1890)
- La Ballerina Waltz (1890), also version for 2 guitars
- Enchantment (1892)
- Chevalier March (1895)
- Esperanza (1896)
- Grand Valse Caprice (1896)
- Preludes (1896)
- Serenata (1896)
- Barcarolle (1919)
- Don't Forget to Write to Me Darling (Varied) (1919)
- Maritana (Grand Selections) (1919)
- Minuet in F major (1919)
- 'Tis the Last Rose of Summer (Varied) (1919)
- Capitol March (1920)
- Grand Fantasie of American Songs (1920)
- Grand Fantasie on 'Annie Laurie' (1920)
