= Clarence L. Partee =

Musician, banjo pedagogue, music publisher

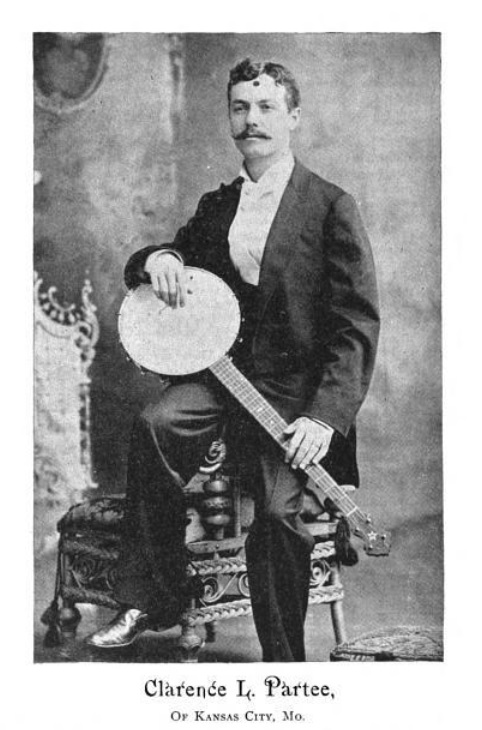
Clarence L. Partee, posing with a banjo for the June 1898 issue of Loomis' Musical Journal. Although he played the mandolin and guitar as well, Partee considered himself primarily a banjoist, championing a "maligned" instrument.

Clarence Lockhart Partee (born Concord, North Carolina January 20, 1864, died Manhattan, New York April 17, 1915) was an American composer and arranger and music publisher. He was also founder, editor and publisher of The Cadenza magazine, and devoted his life to teaching and advancing the banjo, mandolin and guitar, arranging more than 150 works for these three instruments. He was a charter member of the American Guild of Banjoists, Mandolinists & Guitarists, now two separate organizations, the American Guild of Music and the Fretted Instrument Guild of America .

Partee took up the banjo as a profession after his parents died before he was 14, and he moved to Chicago to pursue that goal. In 1881 he began an office manager for the J. B. Schall banjo company, giving banjo lessons and meeting prominent banjo players of the time, including E. M. Hall. He also began studying the guitar and the mandolin.

He became a soloist performer, traveling the country and teaching the banjo, guitar and mandolin. He also composed music and became a music publisher. Places he traveled included Chicago, Cincinnati, St. Louis, Omaha and Kansas City.

== The Cadenza ==
Partee settled in Kansas City about 1890, where his magazine The Cadenza was published, beginning with the September/October 1894 issue. The Cadenza was "the first legitimate, high class magazine devoted to the interests of ... players at large of the banjo, mandolin and guitar." Partee set his own standard, keeping the tone "literary" and the content educational, and as a result, improved the overall standard for magazines of this type. In an effort to expand his magazine's reach, Partee moved it from the Midwest to the New England area and added content tailored toward the cosmopolitan crowd, with stylish women on the cover and stories of banjo, mandolin and guitar players who had found success and love through their music. He also branched out adding sections to the magazine for voice, violin, harp and piano.

Partee chose a non-standard niche for The Cadenza, promoting sheet music rather than specific musical instruments. Another content difference noted by the Musical Journal was that the Cadenza did not devote itself to advertising the owner's merchandise or vilifying his competitors, unlike in other musician-oriented magazines.

Partee moved his Cadenza to New York in 1900, and it was bought in May 1908 by Boston publisher Walter Jacobs. Jacobs ceased publication in 1924.

== Works ==
He was the author of:

- American Conservatory banjo method (1895) written with his brother Charles H. Partee
- Practical hints on modern guitar playing (1899)
- American Conservatory Mandolin Method ... containing also arrangements by Mrs. C. L. Partee (1898)
- Book of harmony and composition : for the violin, mandolin, guitar and banjo (1907)

=== Music ===
- De Coontown Jubilee. Cake Walk. Banjo Solo by Clarence L Partee (1897)
- Prairie rose waltz. By Clarence L. Partee and J.C. Groene & Co, (1890)

== See also ==
- List of mandolinists (sorted)

== Bibliography ==
- Bollman, James F. (1999). America's Instrument: The Banjo in the Nineteenth Century. UNC Press Books. p. 287. ISBN 9780807824849.
- Boyden, Frank L. (1902). Popular American Composers. Herbert Taylor. p. 52–53. "Clarence L Partee."
- Loomis, Clark Merrick (1898). "Clarence L. Partee of Kansas City, Mo". Loomis' Musical and Masonic Journal. 31 (11). C. M. Loomis' Sons: 201.
- Noonan, Jeffrey (2008). The Guitar in America: Victorian Era to Jazz Age. Univ. Press of Mississippi. pp. 32–33. ISBN 9781604733020.
