= Frederick J. Bacon =

Frederick James Bacon
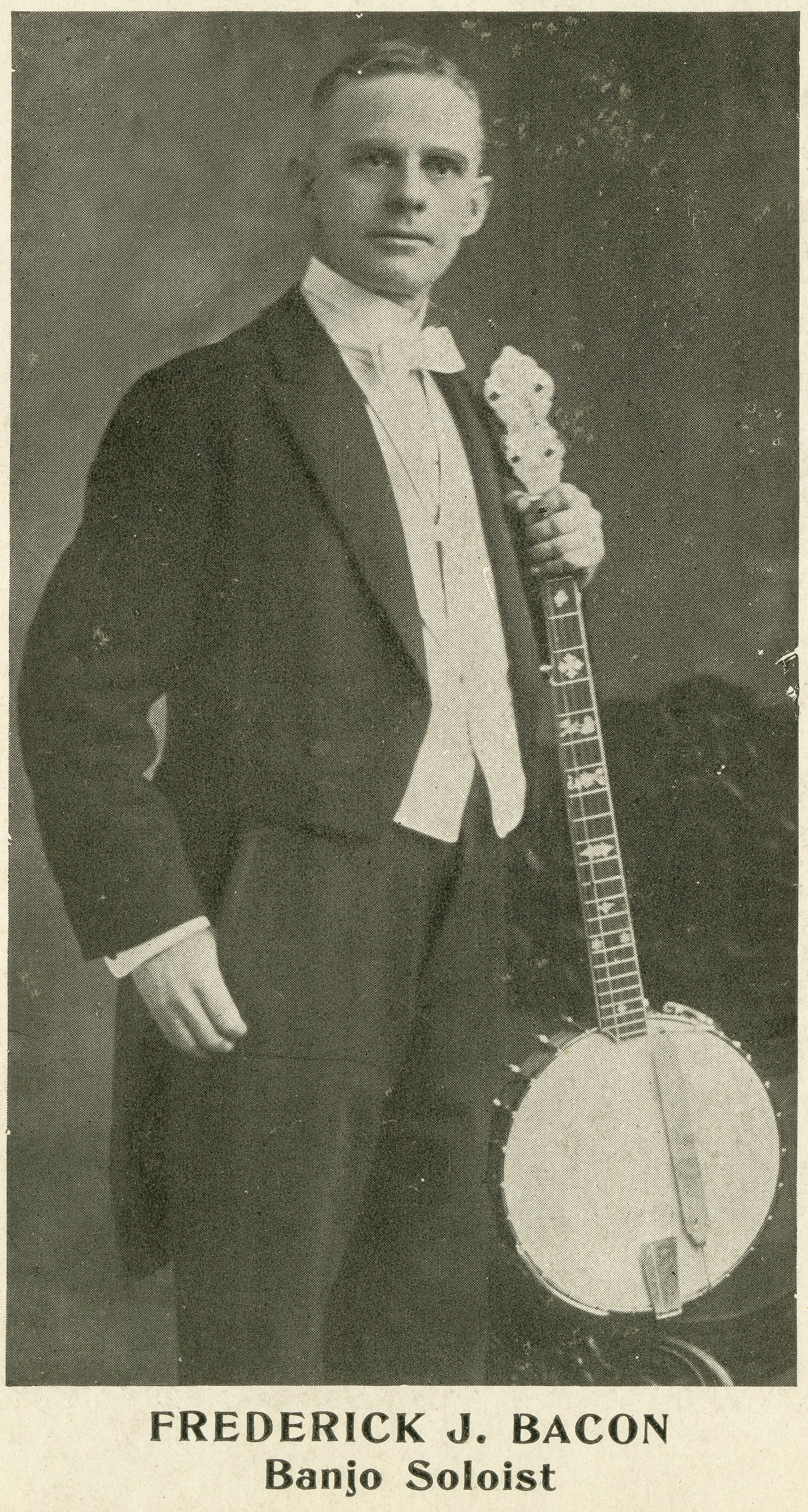
- Frederick J. Bacon with his banjo, at the annual concert of the American Guild of Banjoists, Mandolinists and Guitarists, at Witherspoon Hall, Philadelphia, May 27, 1918. He performed with Samuel Siegel and William Foden.

Background information
- Also known as: Nebraska Fred; Banjo Kid
- Born: January 17, 1871; Holyoke, Massachusetts
- Died: November 18, 1948 (aged 77) Brattleboro, Vermont
- Genres: Medicine Show, Vaudeville, classical music, American folk music, Ragtime
- Occupations: Musician, educator, musical-instrument manufacturer
- Instruments: five-string banjo, snare drum
- Years active: 1887–1948
- Labels: Victor Records; Edison Records
- Formerly of: Bronco John's Wild West Show; Hartford Elite Banjo Club; Bacon Banjo Trio; Bacon Banjo Trio of Boston; Bacon Banjo Quartet; Bacon Banjo Quintet
- Resting place: Rockville, Connecticut
- Spouses: Cassie Maria Bacon; Frances Isabelle Westphal

Frederick J. Bacon (1871-1948) was a late 19th to mid 20th century performer and recording artist on the five string banjo. He was also an inventor and entrepreneur, educator, composer, and designer and manufacturer of banjos. At the height of his performance career he played the banjo nationally. Along with Fred Van Eps and Vess Ossman he was part of a group of banjoists labeled "virtuoso" in the newspapers. He founded the F.J Bacon Co., possibly as early as 1902, after having invented a new resonator for open-back banjos. It wasn't until 1908 that Bacon came up with Bacon Mfg. & Publishing Co. to sell his banjos and music compositions. During the Big Five tour Bacon became Bacon Mfg. Co in 1911 from Forestdale and incorporated Bacon Mfg. Co. in 1912 (dissolved in 1915). In 1918 from New London he called himself Bacon Banjo Mfg. Co. around 1918, and formally the Bacon Banjo Co. Inc in 1920 with E.O Winship and wives. In 1922 his company gained business experience in David L. Day, formerly of Vega. Together they produced Bacon and Day banjos (B.&D. on the headstock), some of which have been considered worthy of display in museums, as showpieces of artistic impulse from the Jazz Age. Frederick and his wife Cassie were proponents of the classic banjo style of playing banjo, in which the strings are plucked with the fingers, without picks.

== Musicianship ==
Across his career, Fred J. Bacon played a variety of musical styles on the five-string banjo and snare drum. His performances included his own compositions such as The Fascinator and The Conqueror march, classical compositions such as Minuette a l'Antique by Paderewski, and arrangements of folk music or minstrel songs, including Massa's in the Cold, Cold Ground. Known mainly as a banjo player, he also continued to bring his drum on stage throughout his career, doing drum solos, and in 1936 advertised as a teacher of banjo, guitar, drums and violin.

Growing up in Connecticut, he took banjo lessons from Alfred A. Farland when he was 12-years old. Bacon began public performance at 16, in medicine shows, variety shows, and Wild West shows, playing the snare drum and swinging his banjo. His earliest acts included roles with "Hornsby's Oats" (a stage show in Boston) and with Broncho John's Wild West Show as "Nebraska Fred." A performance poster in Boston labeled him the "Banjo Kid."

Bacon began performing on his own, under his really name and teaching the banjo. He married Cassie Maria Bacon in 1890, and the two would travel the country and eventually perform together. By 1911, Bacon had learned to play in a duo style, "playing two distinct airs at the same time."

In 1918 Bacon was advertised for a concert representing the banjo before the American Guild of Banjoists, Mandolinists and Guitarists, alongside musicians such as concert Mandolinists Samuel Siegel (mandolin) and William Foden (guitar). The trio performed together in concerts between 1904 and 1918.

Besides his banjo, Bacon also continued to play his snare drum in concert as late as 1933. He played two solos, Battle Scene and Coming and Going of the Empire Express.

== Bacon Banjo Company ==
Bacon's performances became an opportunity to sell banjos as he gained name recognition across the country. By 1907 he was having banjos made for him by Vega to sell as his own. They were sold as far way as Los Angeles and New Jersey.

While living in Hartford he started the "F. J. Bacon and Company" in 1902, with A. E. Squires and G. S. Masleu, selling musical instrument strings. Bacon banjo strings and Bacon violin strings, were sold in music stores in 1903. At the time, he also endorsed Fairbanks banjos in the music store advertisements. In the Cadenza magazine, 1910, he is picture holding a Fairbanks Whyte Laydie.

Bacon experimented with musical instrument making. While visiting Brandon, Vermont in 1901 he sold his "patent neverslip banjo bridge" to W. H. Johnson of that town. Johnson had been making the bridges for the "Bacon Banjo Bridge Company" and invented machinery to automatically make them. That same year, he took out a patent on a tailpiece that allowed musicians to restring their instruments faster. In 1905, while still living in Hartford, Bacon applied for a patent for a new type of resonator for open-backed banjos. He was awarded the patent in June 1906, after he sold his Hartford house in April.

Builders finished working on their house and barn in Forest Dale (part of Brandon), Vermont in 1907. He moved into the home with his wife by 1907, calling it Stonehurst.

In 1908 they bought a second, large place as an investment, that they intended to turn into a hotel. They began touring together as an act about 1910, having two Vermont homes for summer and winter.

Bacon advertised his banjos in the July 1909 issue of Cadenza magazine, as the "Bacon Mfg. and Pub. Co" of Forestdale, Vermont.

Although Bacon was contracting with Vega to make his early banjos, photos in a magazine article show that Bacon had a luthiery set up in Forest Dale, ca. 1910. Bacon may have been selling his banjos from there, also about 1910. By 1913, "the F. J. Bacon Banjo company" or "Bacon Manufacturing Company" was hiring and had a printed catalog of banjos. By 1914, Frederick and Cassie Bacon had sold the Forestdale building used for their banjo factory and moved to New London, Connecticut, across the river from their company's future location. They incorporated their company in 1915 as the "Bacon Banjo Company" of Groton, Connecticut.

The demands for the five-string banjo declined in the 1920s, replaced by the tenor banjo. Bacon brought in David L. Day as vice president of the company, and the banjos that were made under Day reached the top of the market. The high-end banjos that the Bacon Banjo Company made during the Jazz Age were highly decorated with gold plating, engraving ebony, ivory. They were made to sparkle in the hands of entertainers on stage. Their top end model cost $1000, when a worker's yearly wager might be $300.

== Compositions ==
- American Beauty
- The Merry Snowshoers
- c. 1901, Commandery March
- 1910, Arcadia (polka brilliante)
- 1910, The Dragon Fly (dance characteristic)
- 1910, The Enchantress (valse brilliante)
- c. 1910, Happy Thoughts (schottische)
- 1910, La Serenata (serenade)
- 1910, Little Sunbeam (waltz)
- 1910, Pavilion (schottische)
- 1910, Pit Pat (schottische)
- 1910, Sweethearts (romanza)
- 1910, The Round Up (galop di concert)
- 1910, The Troopers
- 1910, The Trumpeter (march)−
- 1910, Twilight Reverie
- 1911 Dance — Magnetic
- 1911, The Fascinator (waltz brilliant)
- 1911, 1925, March — The Conqueror
- 1911, 1921, On the Range (galop)
- 1911, The Turkey Gobbler Rag
- 1911, Wildwood Memories
- 1912, West Lawn Polka
- 1915, Dance Oriental
- 1915, The Dawn of Love
- 1915, Sleep little one sleep (cradle song)
- 1918, Clear the Way, music for
- 1918, Nourmaleen, music for
- 1918, Peace, The New Dawn, music for
- 1919, In Spoonland It's Happy All The Time, music for
- 1921, The Canadian Mounted (march)
- 1921, The Coquette (schottische)
- 1921, Dance of the Fairies
- 1921, Dance of the Scarecrows
- 1921, Dancing Sunbeams
- 1921, The Debutante (schottische caprice)
- 1921, Loves Secret
- 1921, March of the Marines
- 1921, On the Trail, march
- 1921, Pretty Brown Eyes
- 1921, The Princess (polka di concert)
- 1921, Waltz Impromptu
- 1921, Tarantella
- 1921, The Winnipeg Rag
- c. 1922, Crazy Quilt Rag
- 1922, A Study in Black Rag
- 1925, Naval Cadets March
- c. 1926, Silver Bell March
- c. 1927, Ghost Dance
- c. 1927, Spirit Dance, Indian lament
- c. 1928, Chinese Serenade
- c. 1928, Dancing Moonbeams
- c. 1928, The Dawn of Love (waltz)
- c. 1928, Hopi Indian Snake Dance
- c. 1928, Mia Rita (Mexican Serenade)
- c. 1928, Satan's return

=== Arrangements and variations ===
- Moskowski Valse (Moritz Moszkowski)
- Pride of Fifth Avenue (march)
- 1897, Alice, Where Art Thou? (romance) (J. Ascher)
- c. 1901, Kaka Kaka Dance
- c. 1901, Medley, Old Songs
- c. 1901, Medley, Popular Songs
- c. 1902, Medley, Popular Airs
- c. 1902, Chinese Picnic, (John St. George) descriptive
- c. 1902, Grand Operatic Potpourri

selections from:

Il Trovatore or To Arms (march)
Carmen
Poet and Peasant (Suppe)
William Tell

- c. 1905 The Nightingale and the Frogs (Richard Eilenberg)
- c. 1905 Grand Polka de Concert (Homer Newton Bartlett)
- c. 1905 Valse Brilliante or Grand Valse de Concert (Wieniawski op.3)
- c. 1908, National Airs, grand fantasia
- c. 1908, Grand Valse Brilliante
- c. 1909, Polkadi Concert

c. 1909, Medley of Familiar Airs

- c. 1909, Say Not Farewell
- 1910, At a Husking Bee, reels and hornpipes

Irish Washerwoman
Fisher's Hornpipe
Old Zip Coon
The Campbells Are Coming
Arkansas Traveler

- c. 1910, Familiar Scotch Airs
- 1911, Famous Reels and Hornpipes, banjo

Liverpool Hornpipe
Four Hand Reel
Rickett's Hornpipe

- 1911, Kinloch of Kinloch (fantasia for banjo), Scottish air, variations
- 1911, 1921, Old Black Joe, 2 variations
- 1911, Old Folks at Home (Stephen Foster, Berthold)
- 1911, La Paloma
- c. 1911, The Round Up
- c. 1911, Selections from Faust (Gounod)
- c. 1911, Selections from Famous Overtures
- c. 1911, Songs of Long Ago, variations
- 1921, Sextet from "Lucia" (Gaetano Donizetti)
- c. 1933, Sounds from the Cotton Fields

== Published works ==
=== Folios ===
- 1906, Siegel-Myers Correspondence School of Music ... Chicago. Banjo Lesson No. 1(-4). Composed and edited by F. J. Bacon. Chicago : Siegel-Myers Correspondence School of Music, 1906.
- 1910, Compositions and Arrangements for Banjo with Piano accompaniment, by F. J. Bacon. Chicago: Siegel-Myers School of Music, (1910).

includes: Arcadia (polka brilliante); La Serenata (serenade); Little Sunbeam (waltz); Pavilion (schottische); Pit Pat (schottische); Sweethearts (romanza); The Dragon Fly (dance characteristic); the Enchantress (valse brilliante); The Round Up (galop di concert); The Trumpeter (march).
Alternatively called 10 Original Compositions for Banjo and Piano

- c. 1928, Bacon melody folio : 5 choice solos

contains Hopi Indian Snake Dance, Chinese Serenade, Dancing Moonbeams, Mia Rita (Mexican Serenade), The Dawn of Love (Waltz).

=== Methods ===
- 1911, New and revised method for the banjo, Bacon-Goggin Publishing Company, Schenectady, N.Y. This book teaches the banjo in A notation.
- 1915, Lesson (A) in Tremolo
- 1915, Tremolo Lesson Number 2
- 1921 Paramount Method for Banjo in C Notation, William J. Smith Music Company, New York
- 1924 The Improved paramount Method for the Banjo : in C notation, finger style, William J. Smith Music Company, New York

== Recordings ==
=== Victor ===
- 1912, March 22 The enchantress, Victor, B-11780, F. J. Bacon, Banjo solo, unaccompanied
- 1912, March 22 Massa's in de cold, cold ground, Victor, B-11782, F. J. Bacon, Banjo solo, unaccompanied
- 1912, March 22 Old folks at home, Victor, B-11783, F. J. Bacon, Banjo solo, unaccompanied
- 1912, April 15 The troopers march, Victor, B-11877, F. J. Bacon, banjo solo, accompanied by Fred Bachman (piano)
- 1912 April 15 West lawn polka, Victor, Victor 17129, Matrix/Take: B-11781/4, Fred J. Bacon, banjo solo, accompanied by Fred Bachman

=== Edison ===
- 1915, December 11 Massa's in de cold, cold ground, Edison Blue Amberol: 2853 / Edison Record: 4330, Fred J. Bacon, banjo solo, unaccompanied
- 1916, February 5, Old Black Joe, Edison matrix 4475, Edison 50351, Fred J. Bacon, banjo solo, unaccompanied
- 1917 Medley of Scotch airs, Edison Blue Amberol: 3109 / Edison Record: 5110, Fred J. Bacon, banjo solo, unaccompanied
- 1917Medley of southern airs, Edison Blue Amberol: 3122 /Edison Record: 5109, Fred J. Bacon, banjo solo, unaccompanied. Includes My old Kentucky home, Dixie, Old folks at home.

=== Bacon Banjo Company ===
- 1926 Massa's in the cold, cold ground, Bacon Banjo Company, promotional record, Fred J. Bacon, banjo solo, unaccompanied

== Gallery ==
=== Classic banjos ===
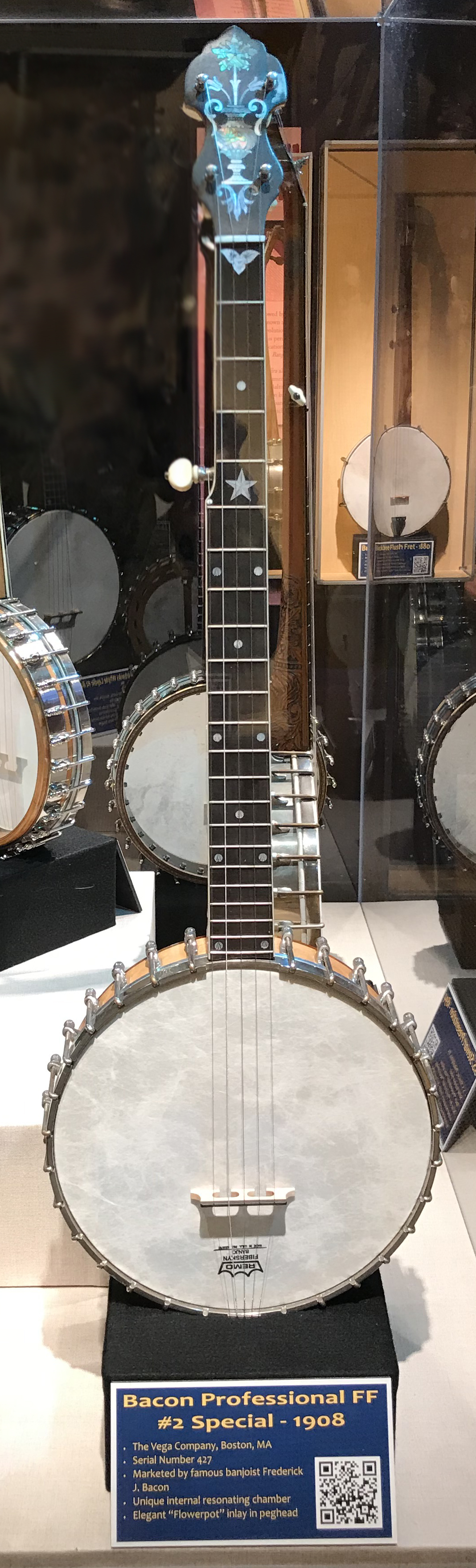
Bacon Professional FF #2 banjo, 1908, made by Vega. American Banjo Museum

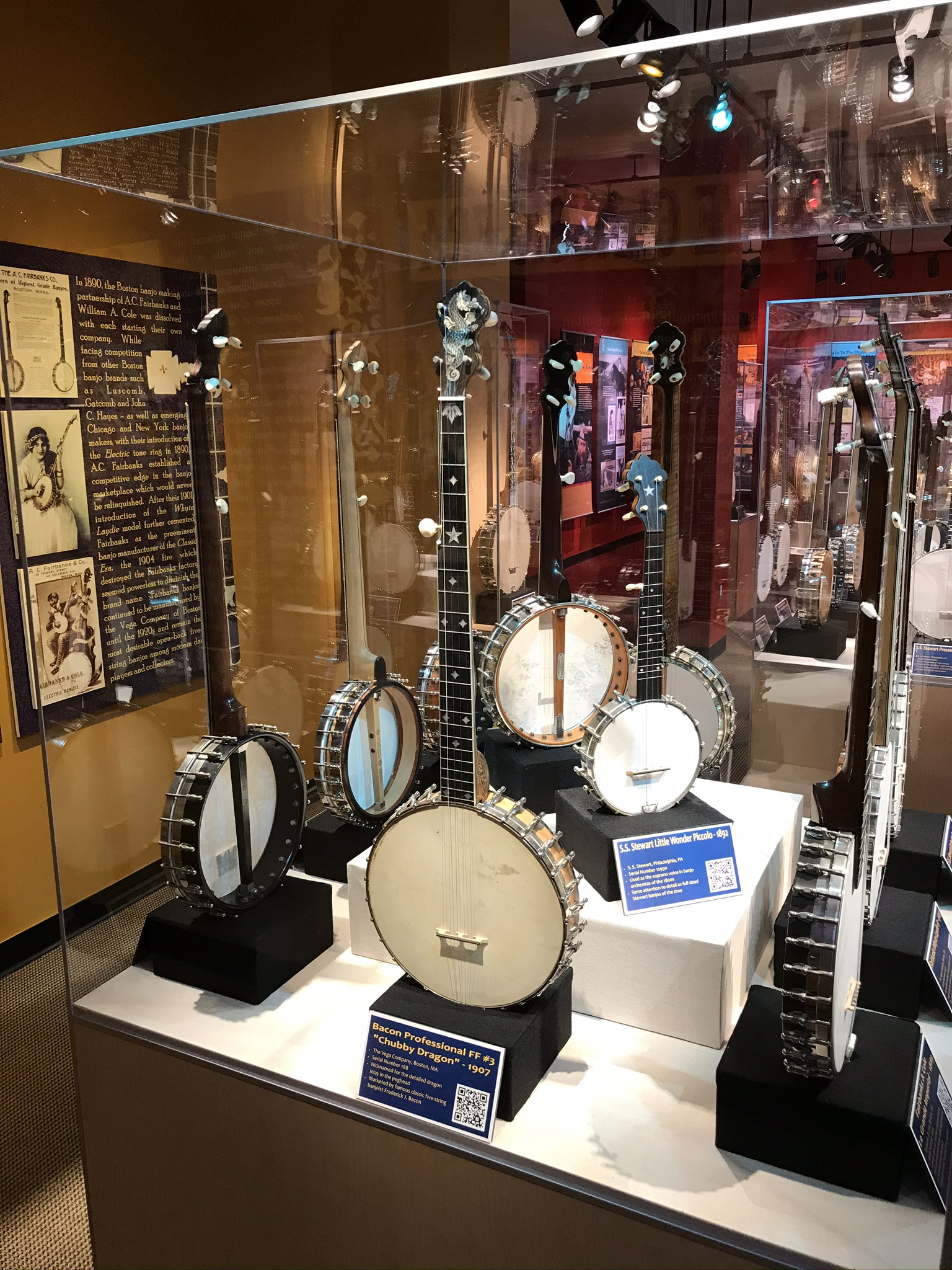
Bacon Professional FF #3 Banjo, made by Vega in 1907 and S.S. Stewart Little Wonder Piccolo banjo, 1897

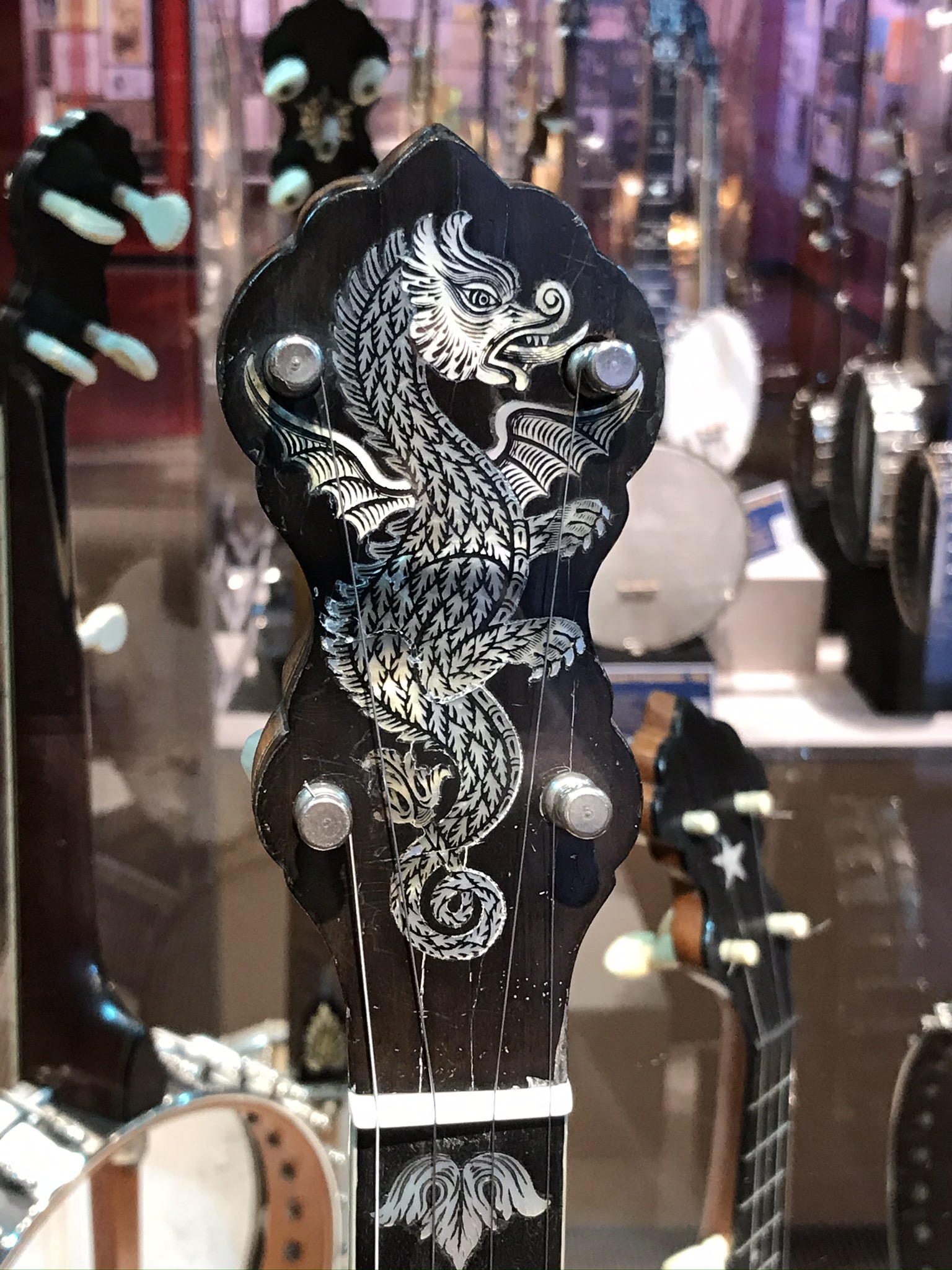
Headstock of Bacon Professional FF 3 Banjo, called the "Chubby Dragon"

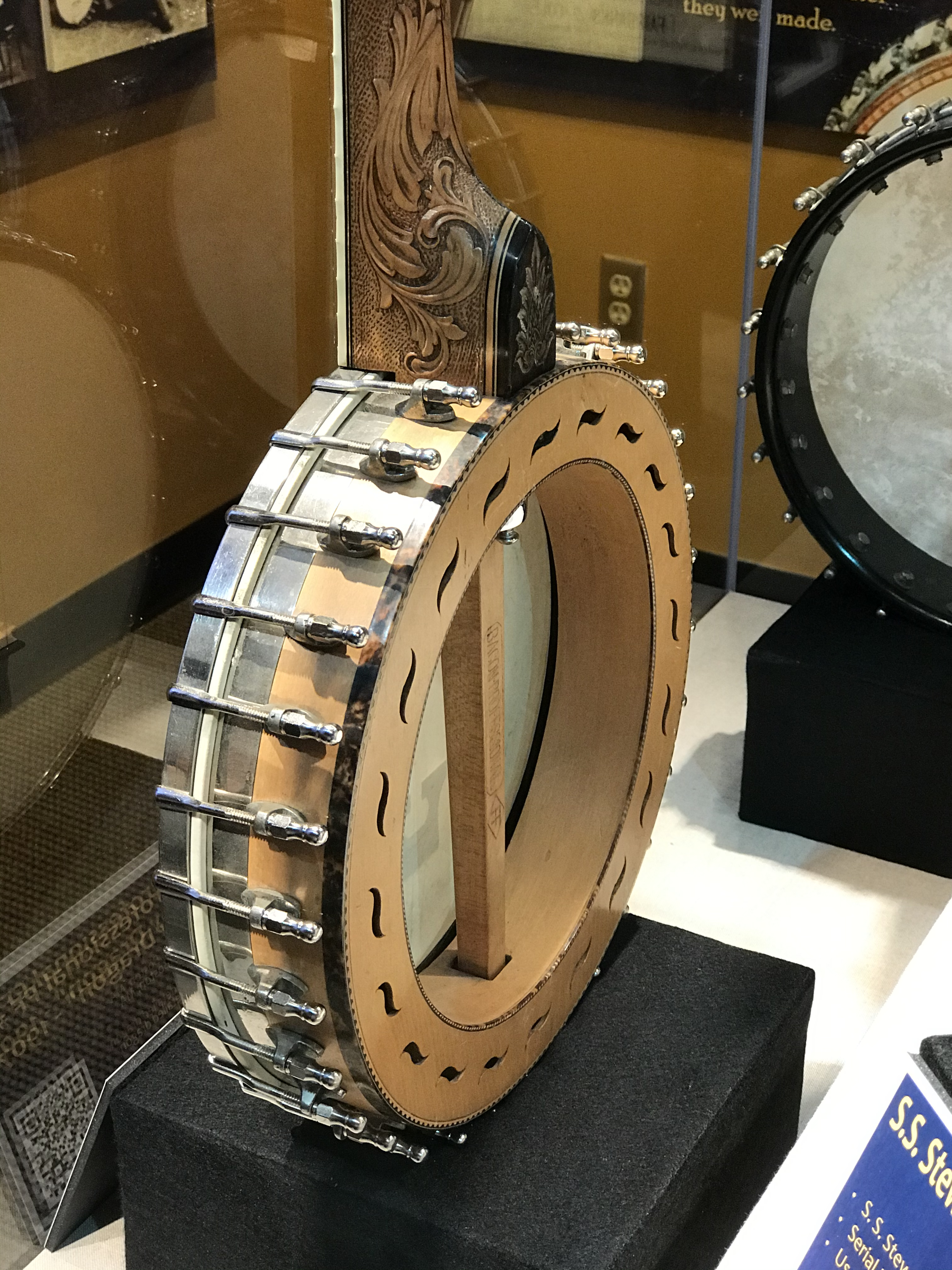
Resonator for Bacon banjos, which he patented in 1906

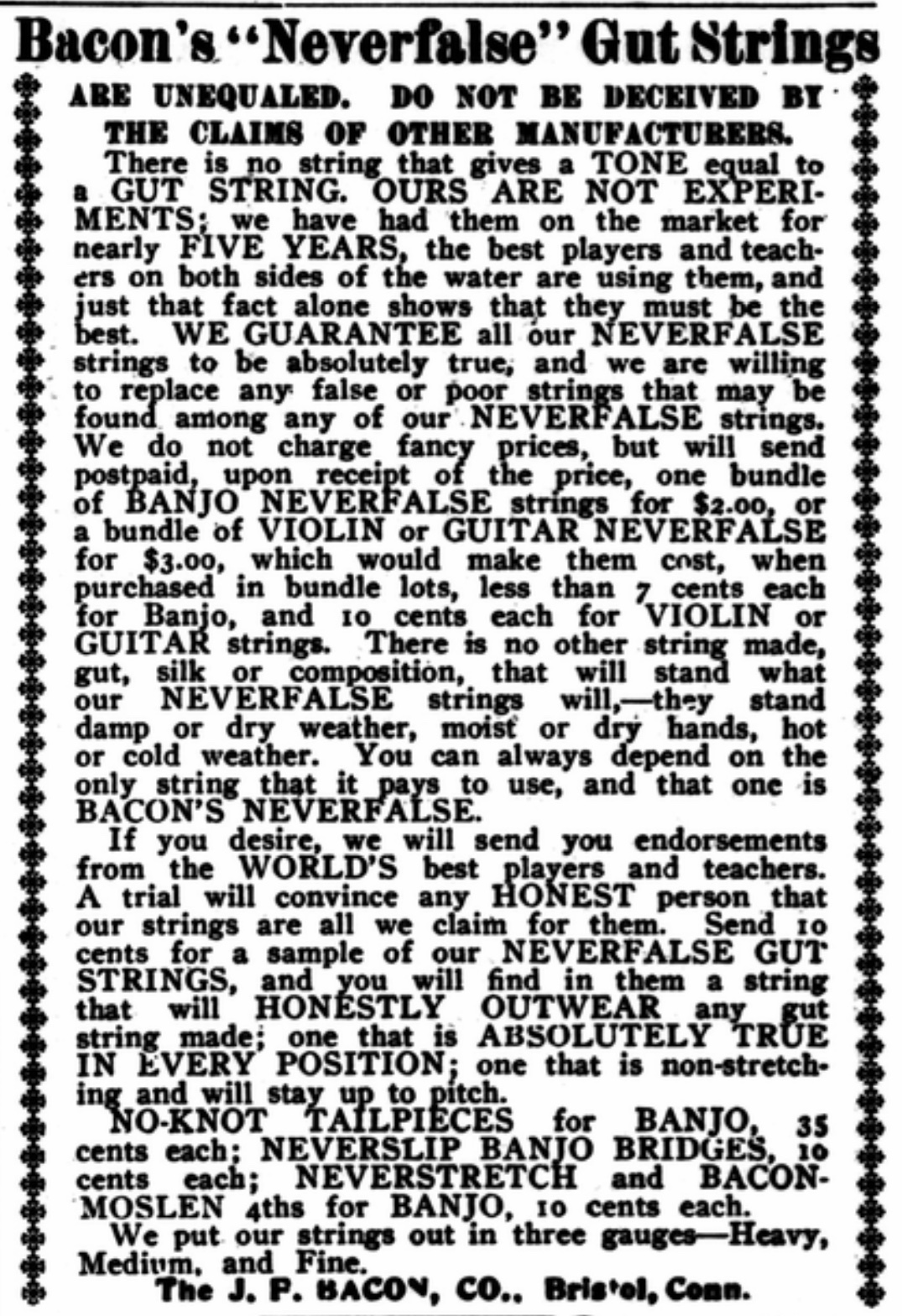
Advertisement, Bacon Neverfalse Gut Strings, Cadenza magazine, August 1905, p53

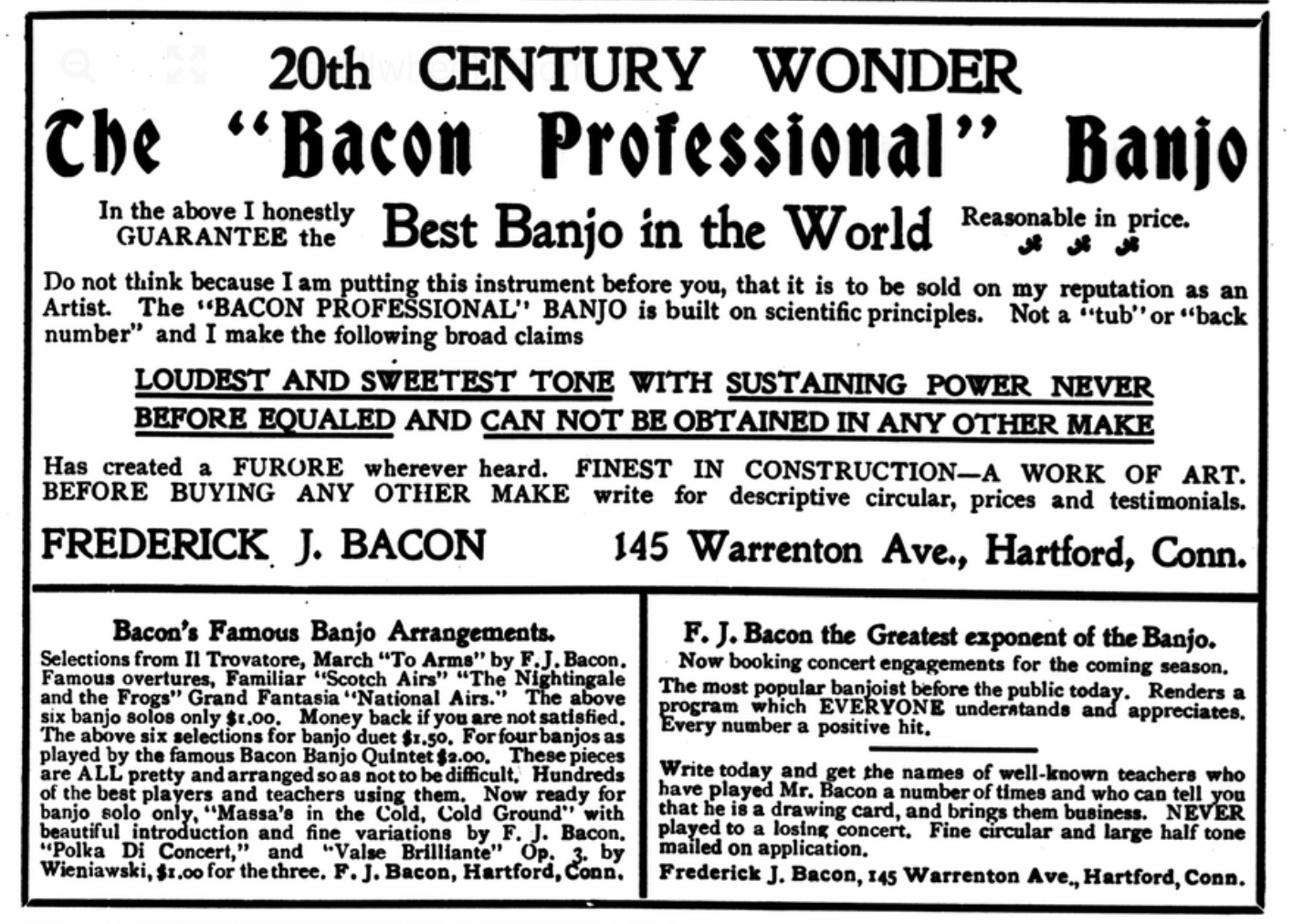
Advertisement, Bacon profession Bacon, Cadenza magazine, September 1905, p53

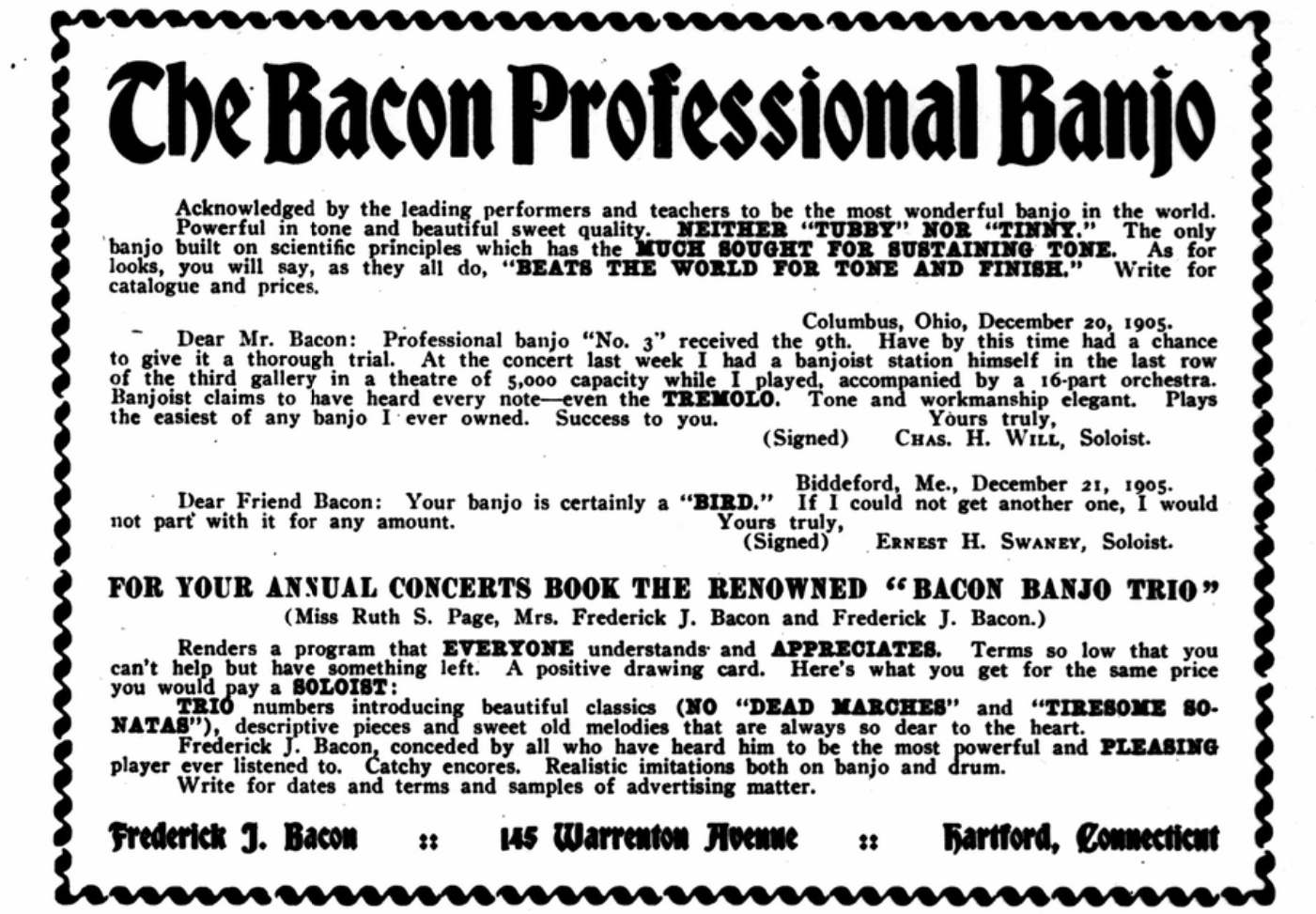
Advertisement, Bacon profession Bacon, Cadenza magazine, February 1906, p53

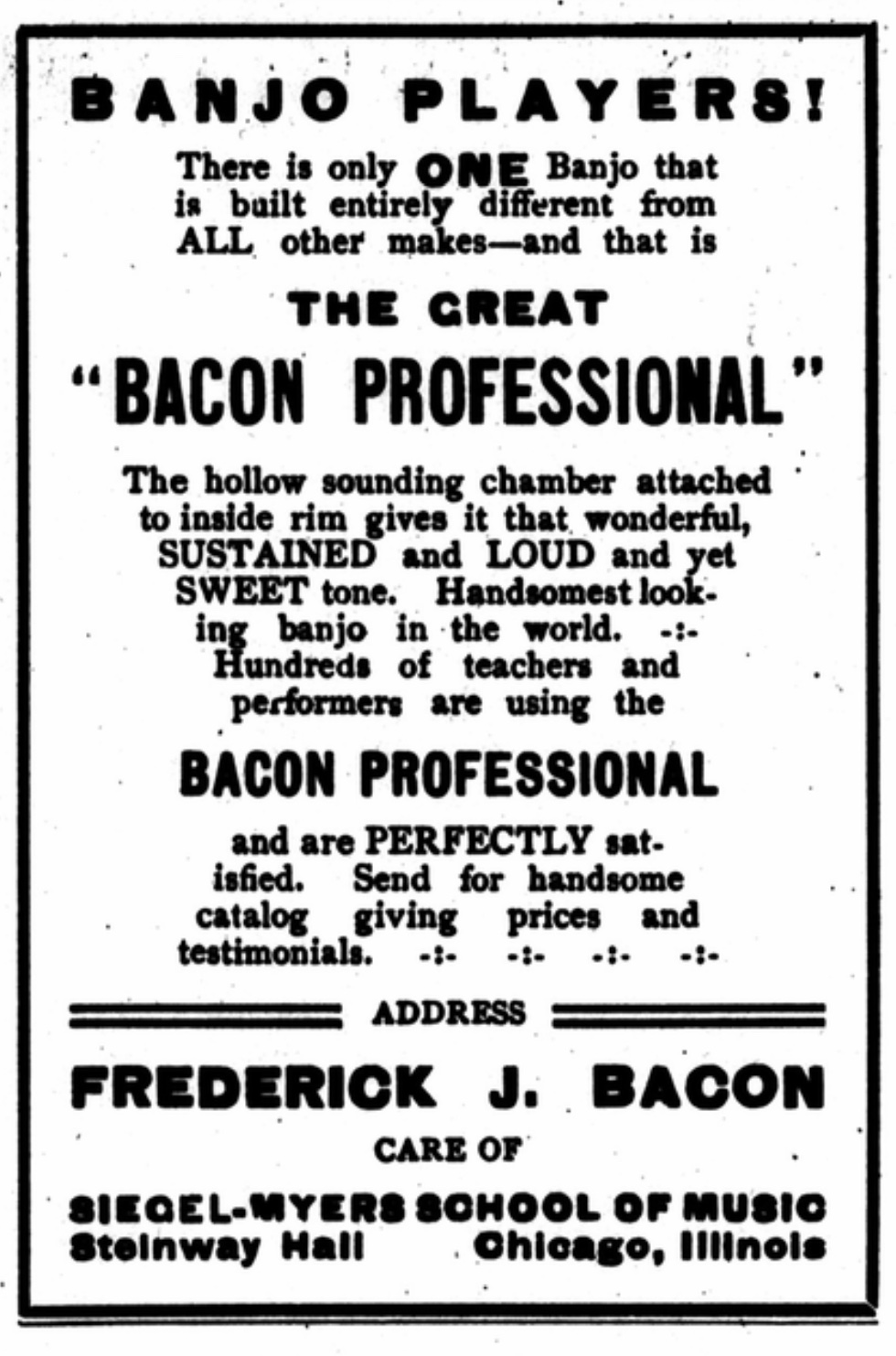
Frederick J. Bacon advertisement, Cadenza, February 1907

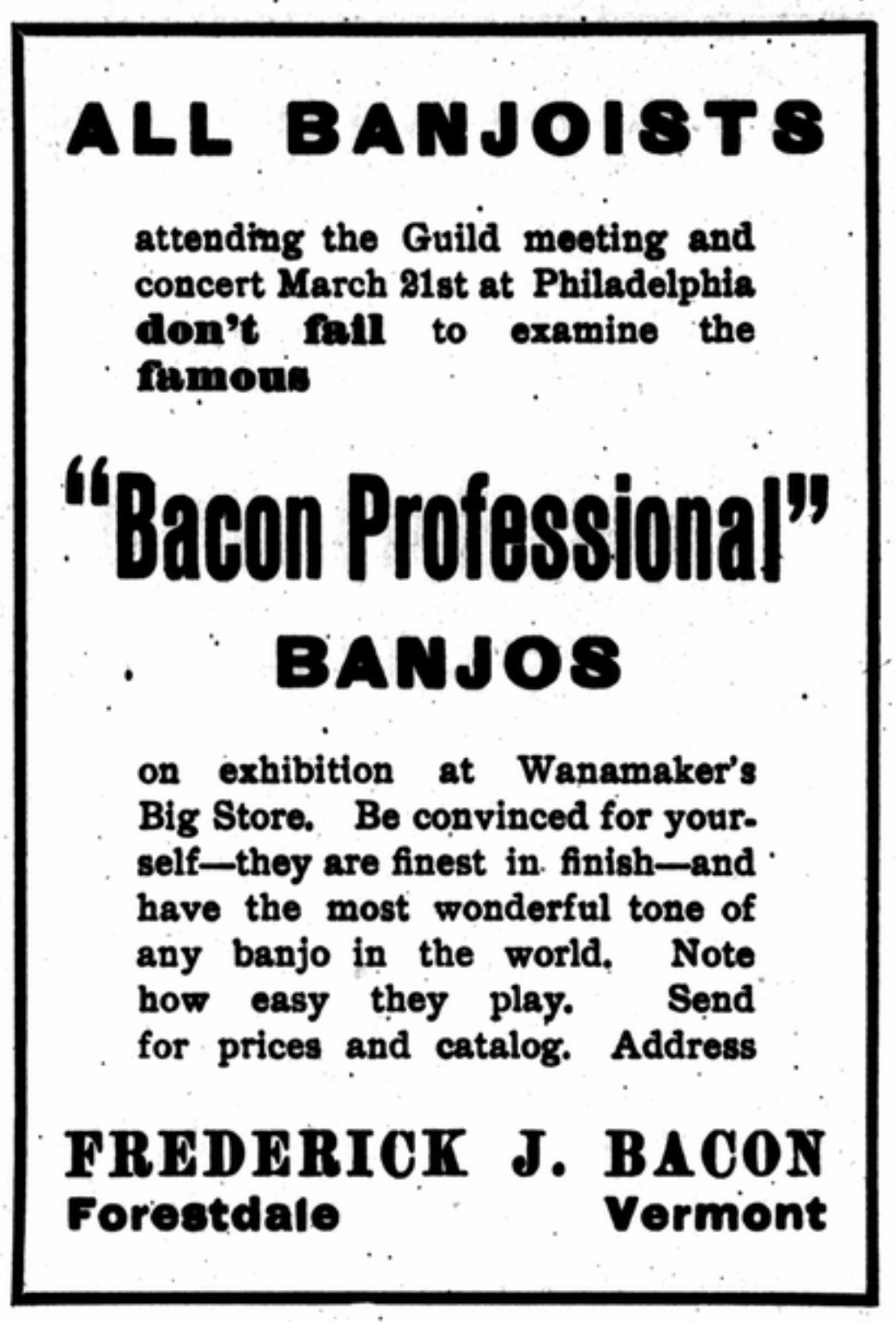
Advertisement, Bacon Professional Banjos, Cadenza Magazine, March 1907, p. 56

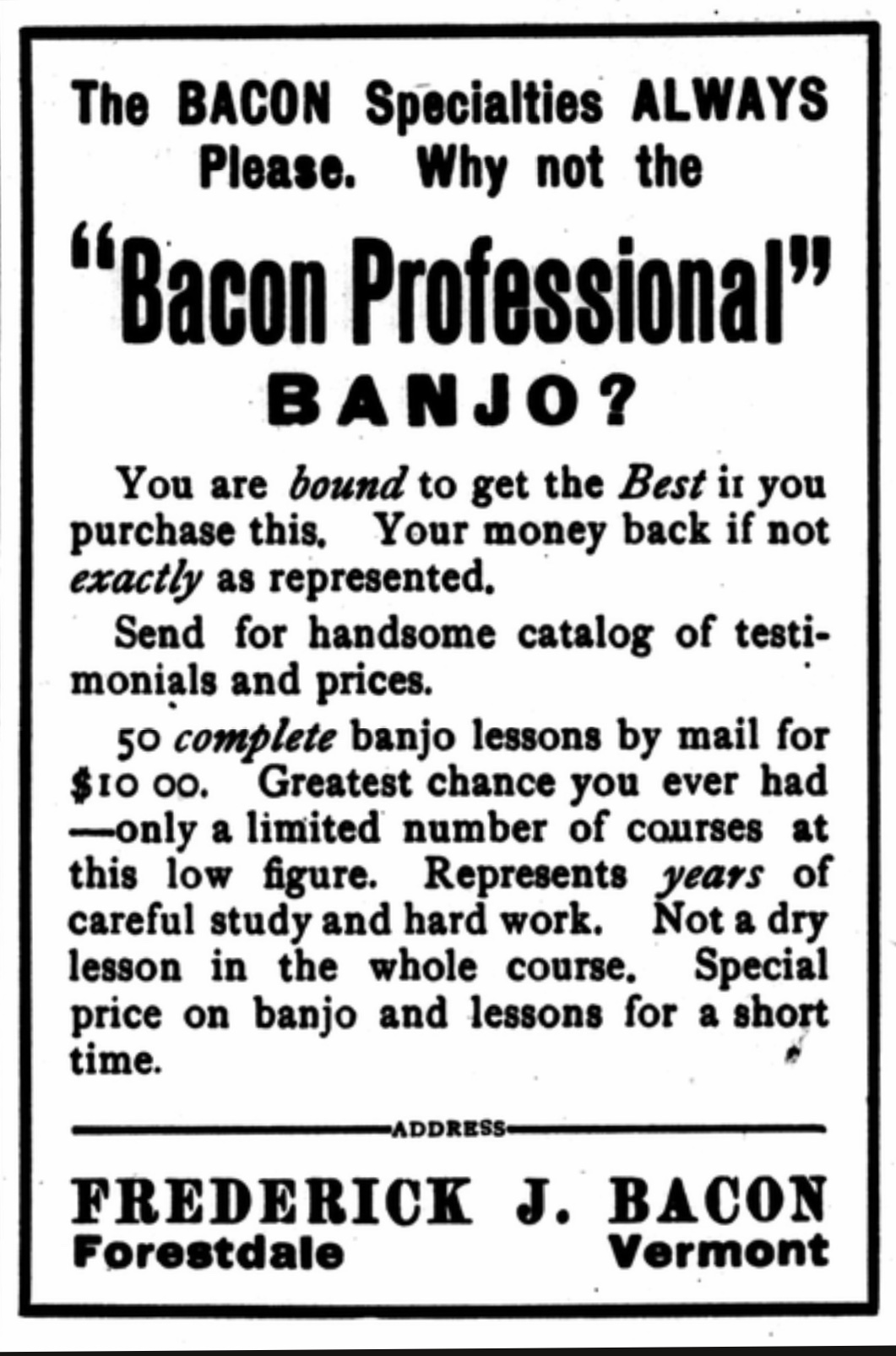
Advertisement, Bacon profession Bacon, Cadenza magazine, June 1907, p. 6

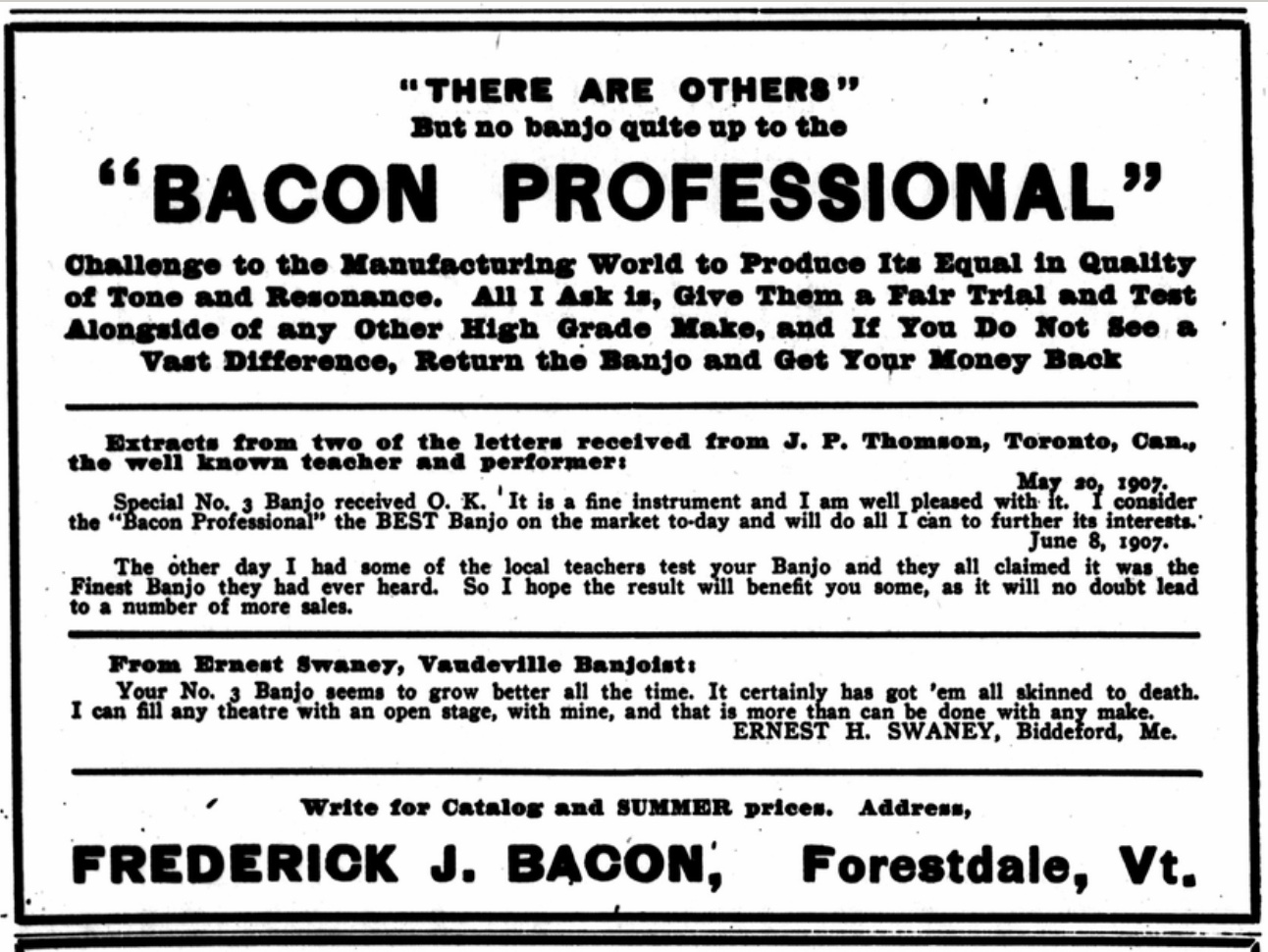
Advertisement, Bacon profession Bacon, Cadenza magazine, July 1907, p52

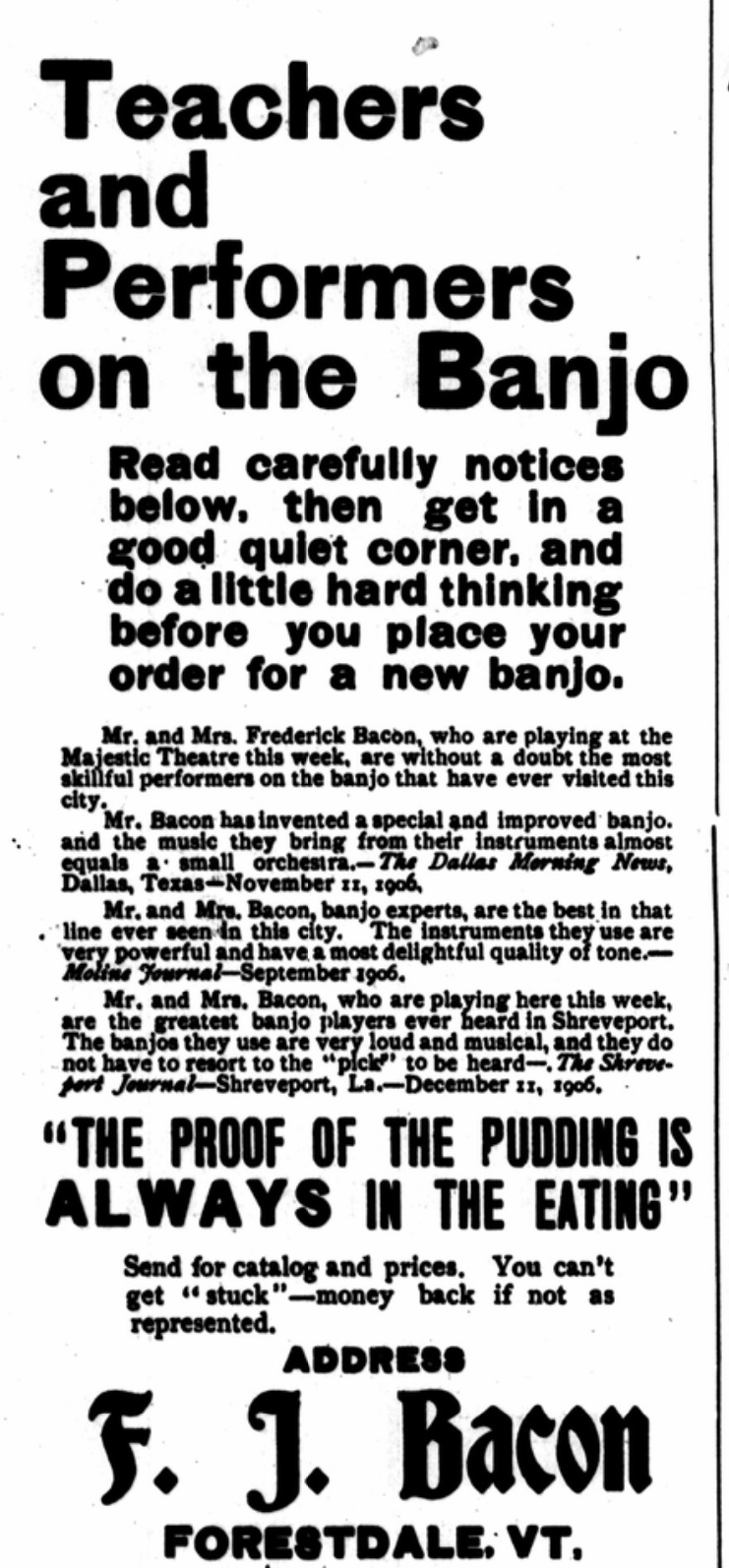
Advertisement, F J Bacon, Cadenza magazine, October 1907, p52

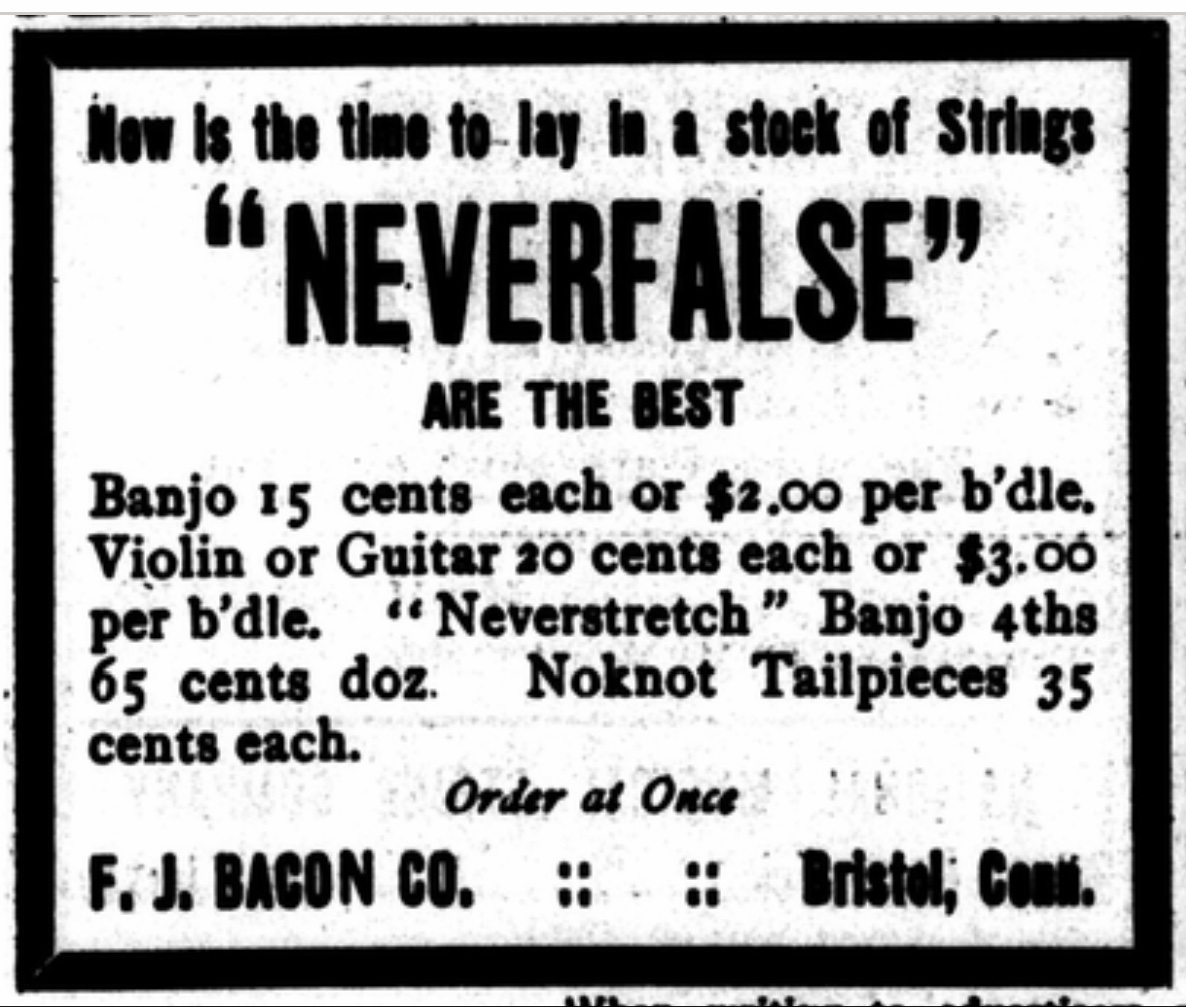
F J Bacon Company Cadenza magazine, November 1907, p. 55

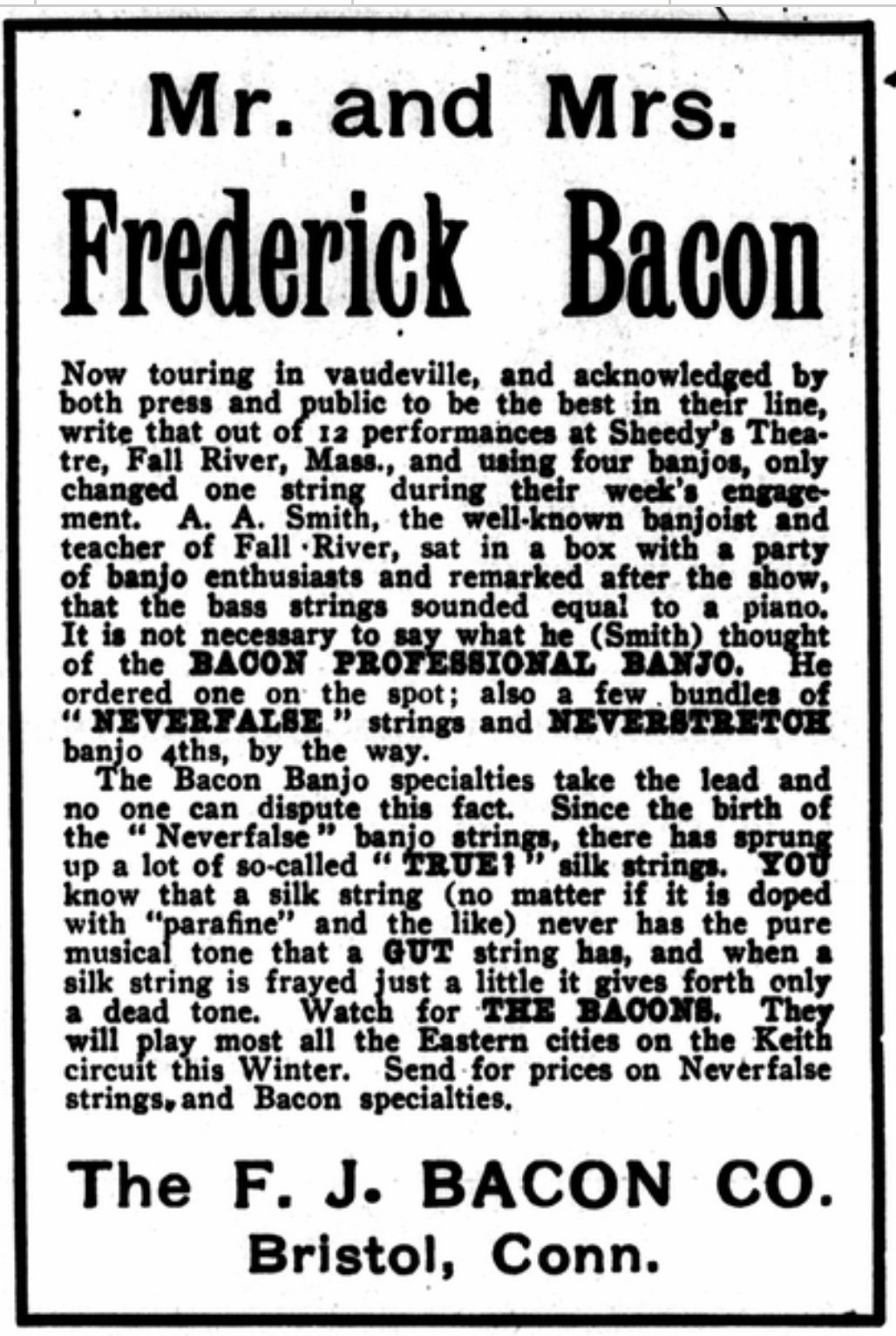
Frederick Bacon, Cassie Bacon, advertisement Dec 1907, selling banjos and strings

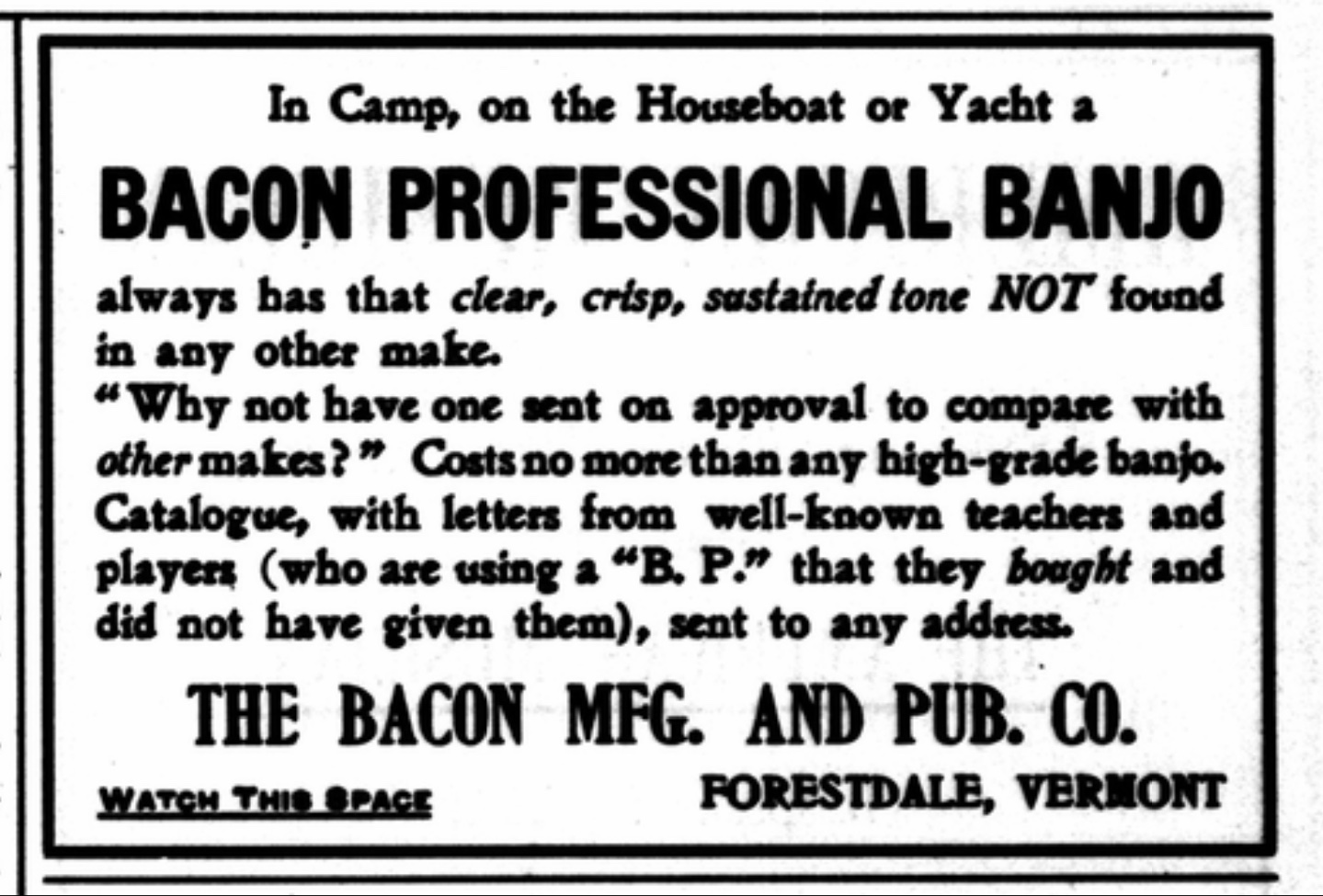
The Bacon Manufacturing and Publishing Company, advertisement, Cadenza magazine, July 1908

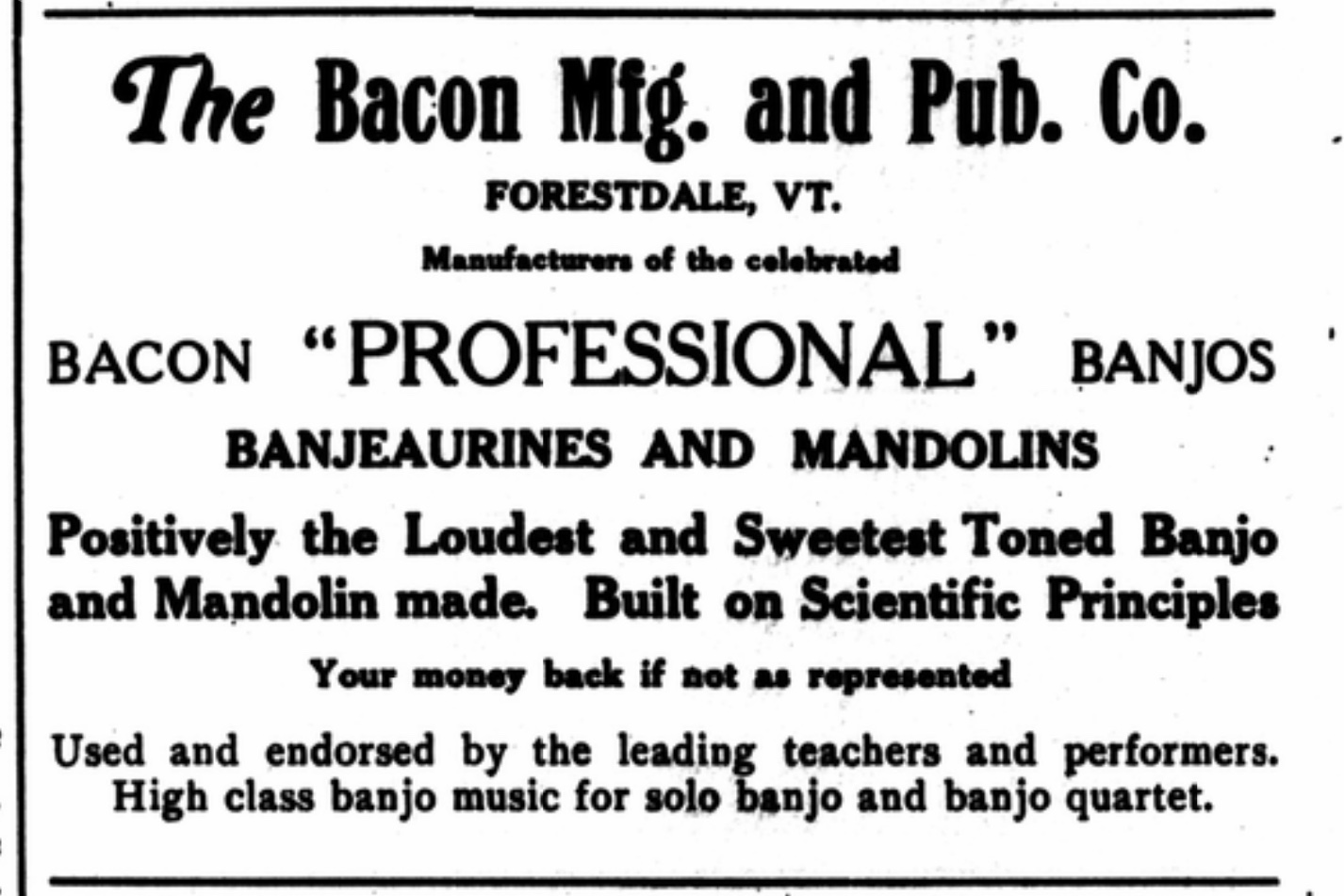
The Bacon Manufacturing and Publishing Company, advertisement, Cadenza magazine, July 1909

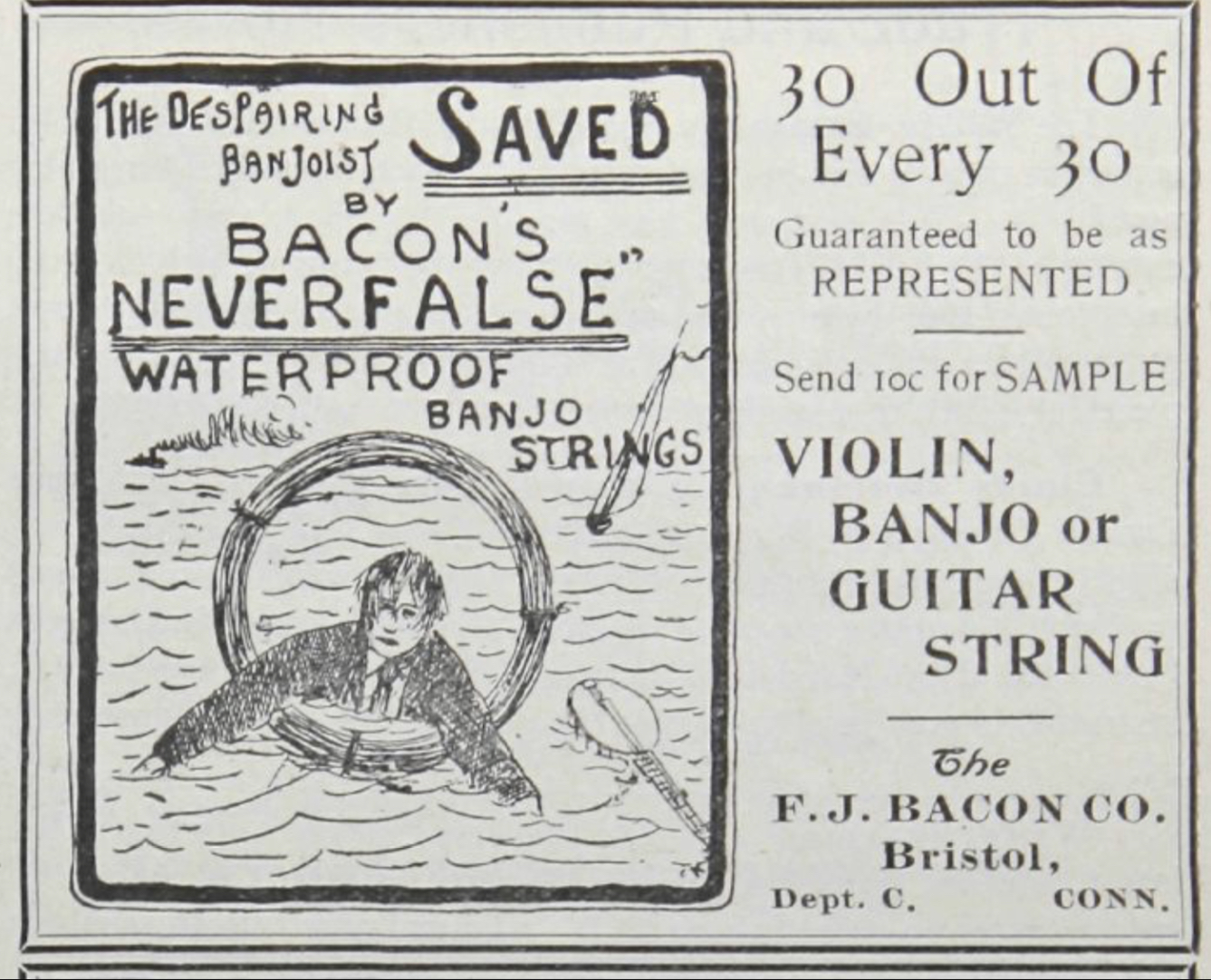
Advertisement Bacon's Neverfalse Banjo Strings From Crescendo magazine February 1910

=== Jazz Age banjos ===
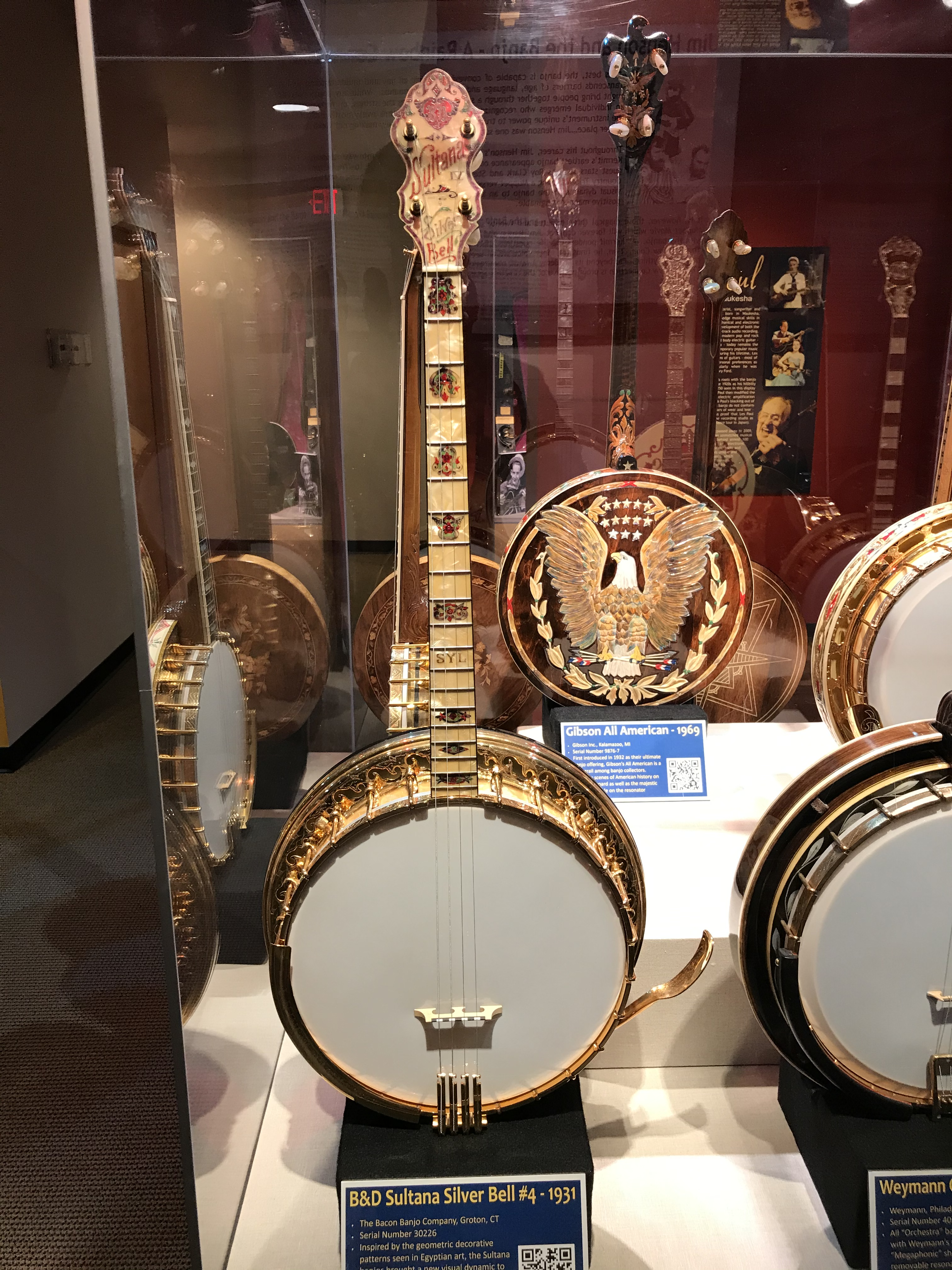
B&D Sultana Silver Bell #4 tenor banjo, 1931

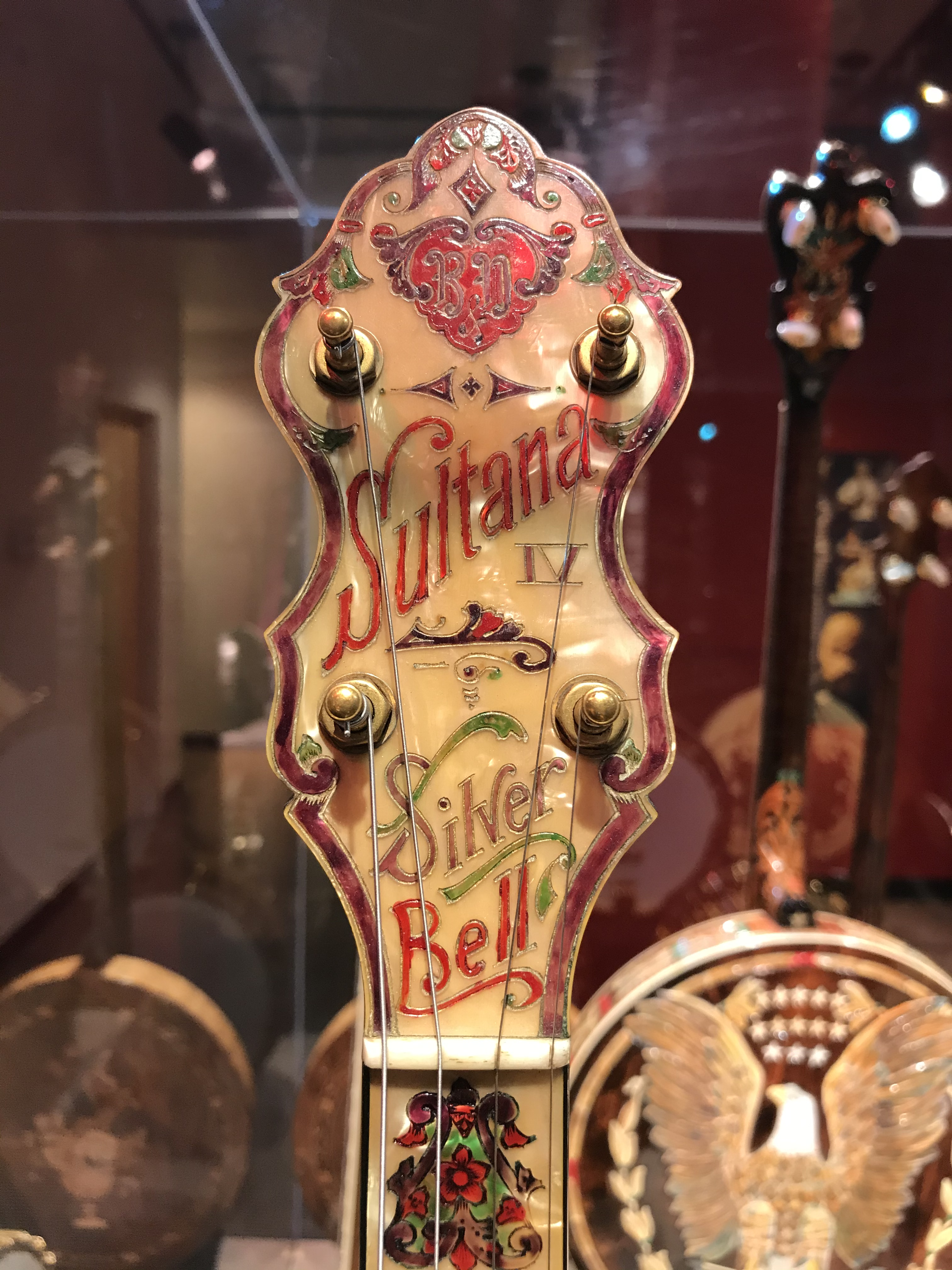
Headstock of a B&D Sultana Silver Bell #4

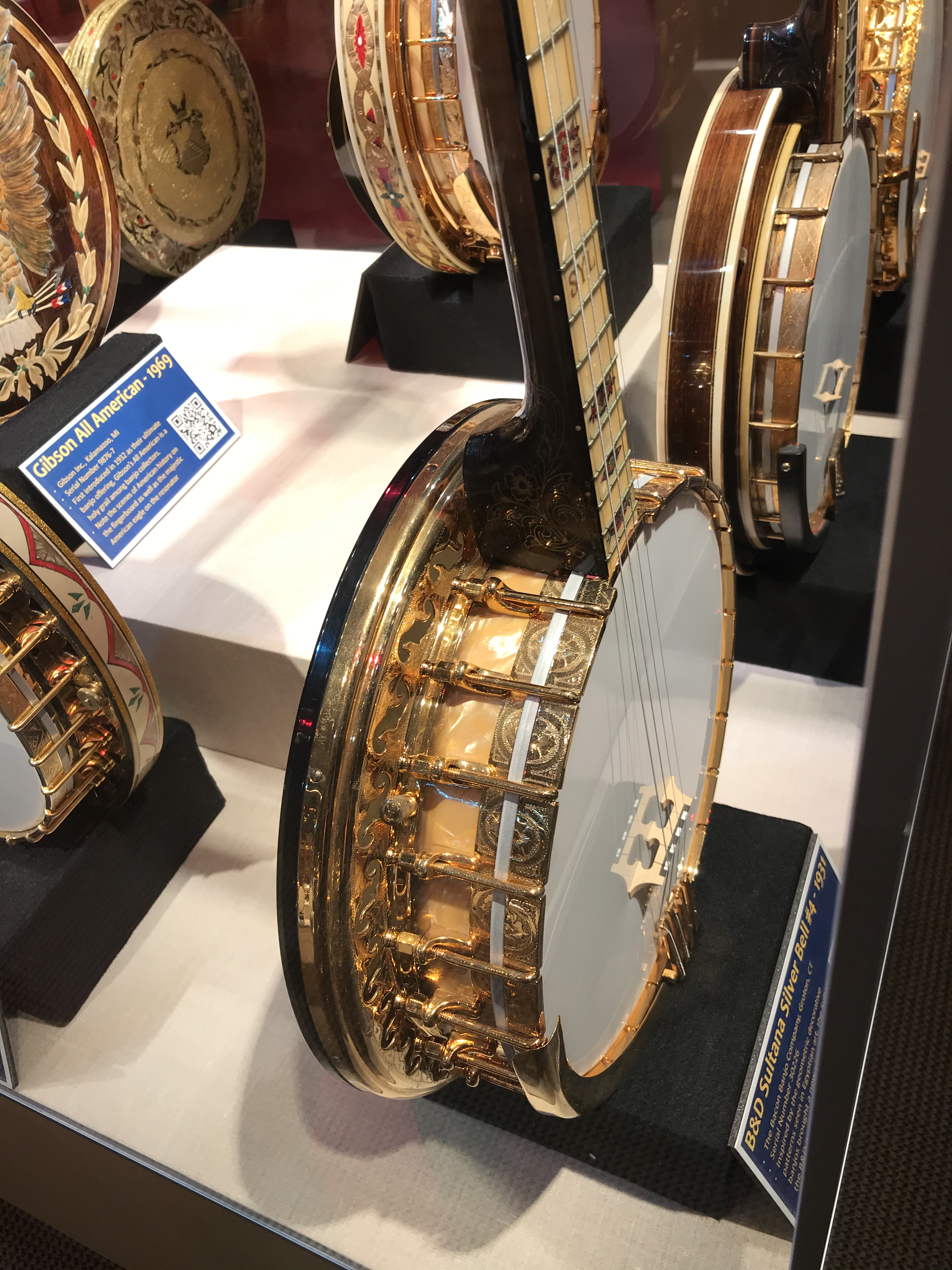
Engraved and decorated, B&D Sultana Silver Bell No 4 banjo

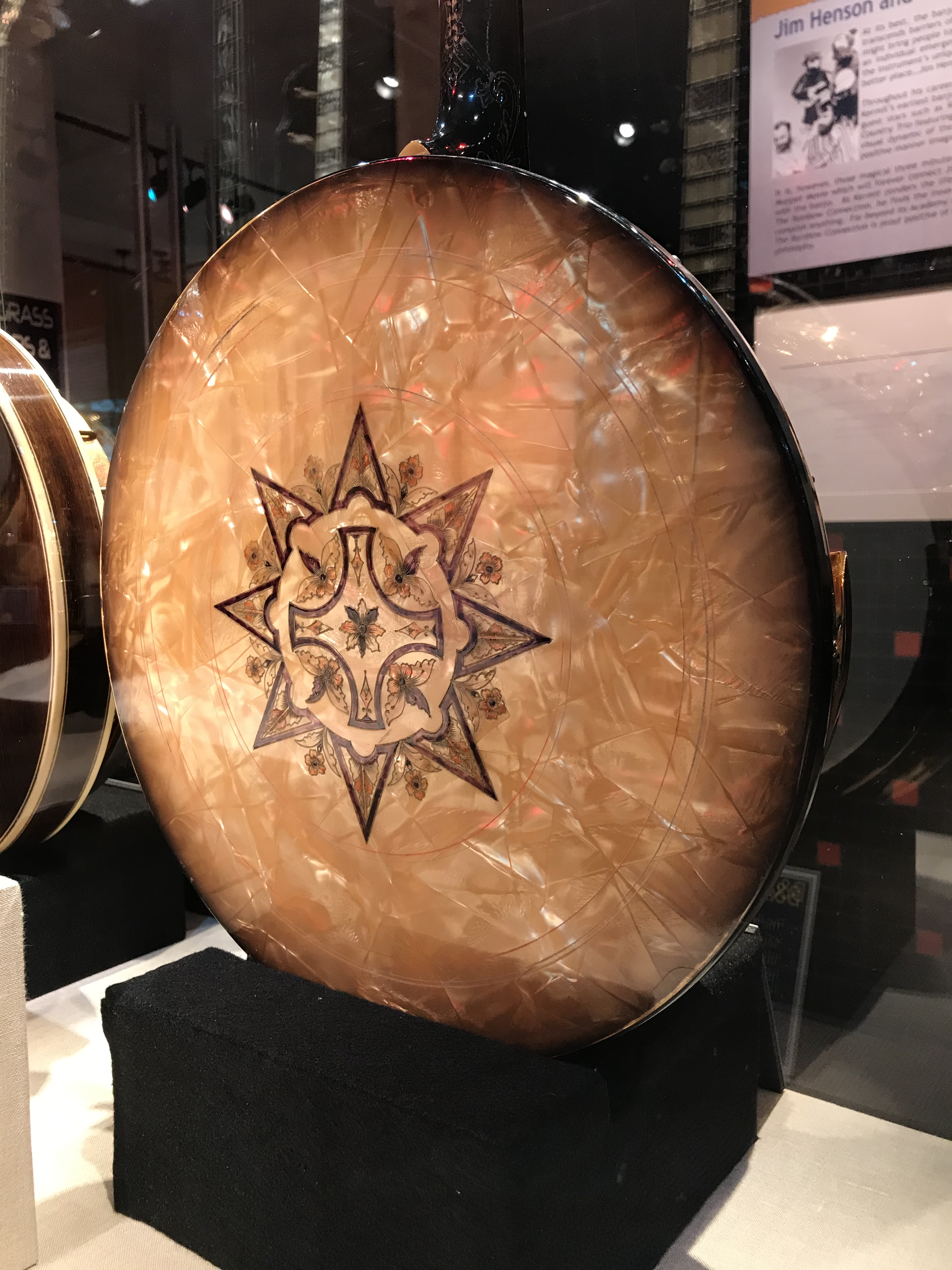
Resonator back on a B&D Sultana Silver Bell No 4 banjo, 1931

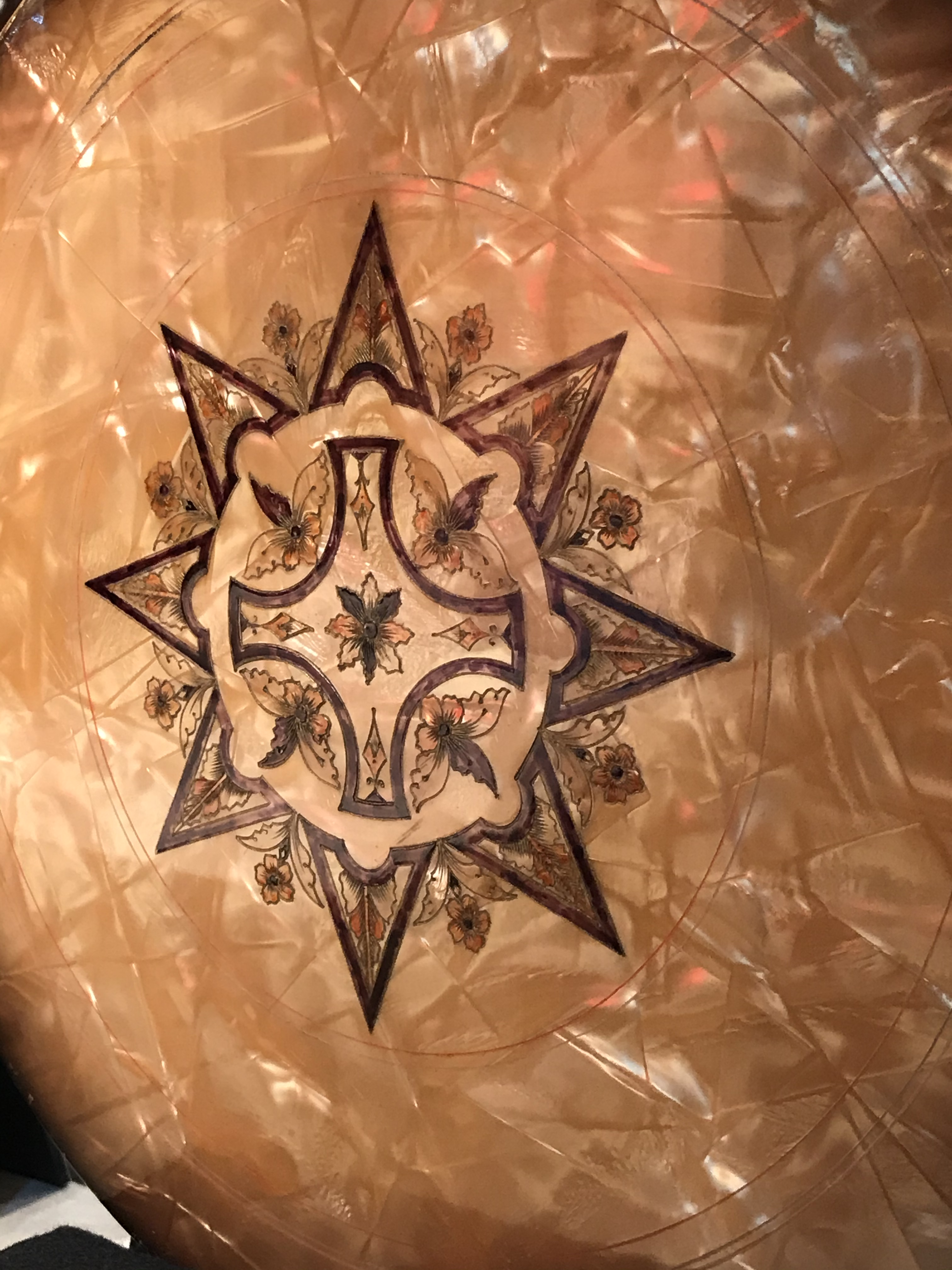
Resonator back closeup on a B&D Sultana Silver Bell No 4 banjo, 1931
