= Classical guitar =

String instrument

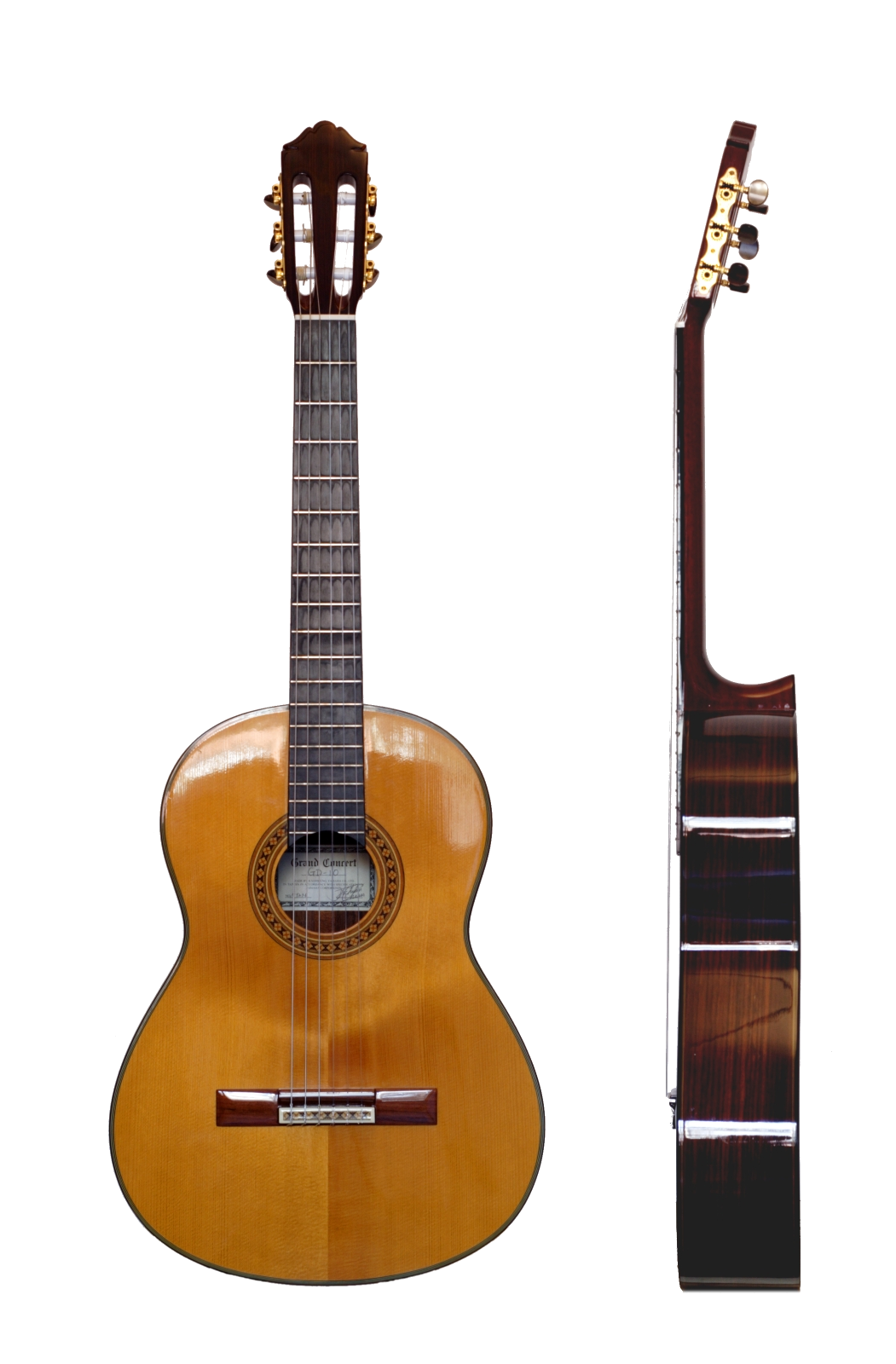
- Front and lateral view of a typical modern classical guitar

String instrument
- Classification: String instrument (plucked)
- Hornbostel–Sachs classification: 321.322–5 (Composite chordophone sounded by the bare fingers or fingernails)
- Developed: Late 19th century, Spain

Playing range

Related instruments
- Guitar family (Steel-string acoustic guitar, Electric guitar, Flamenco guitar, Bass guitar); Lute (distantly related); Baroque guitar; Looks similar to Flamenco guitar

Musicians
- Category:Classical guitarists

The classical guitar, also known as a Spanish guitar, is a member of the guitar family used in classical music and other styles. As an acoustic wooden string instrument with strings made of gut or nylon, it is a precursor of the modern steel-string acoustic and electric guitars, both of which use metal strings. Classical guitars derive from instruments such as the lute, the vihuela, the gittern (the name being a derivative of the Greek "kithara"), which evolved into the Renaissance guitar and into the 17th and 18th-century baroque guitar. Today's modern classical guitar was established by the late designs of a 19th-century Spanish luthier, Antonio de Torres Jurado.

For a right-handed player, the traditional classical guitar has 12 frets that are clear of the body and is properly held up by the left leg, so that the hand that plucks or strums the strings does so near the back of the sound hole. This is called the classical, or sul ponticello, position. However, the right hand may move to the sul tasto position, closer to the fretboard, to achieve a different tonal quality (warmer), or closer to the saddle (more metallic). To position the classical guitar correctly, the player's left leg is typically raised on a foot rest or a support is used. The modern steel string guitar, on the other hand, usually has at least 14 frets clear of the body (see Dreadnought) and is commonly held with a strap around the neck and shoulder.

Classical guitars are distinguished from electric and acoustic guitars, which are often considered easier to play, largely due to the less sophisticated right hand technique.

The phrase "classical guitar" may refer to either of two concepts other than the instrument itself:

- The instrumental finger technique common to classical guitar—individual strings plucked with the fingernails or, less frequently, fingertips
- The instrument's classical music repertoire

The term modern classical guitar sometimes distinguishes the classical guitar from older forms of guitar, which are in their broadest sense also called classical, or more specifically, early guitars. Examples of early guitars include the six-string early romantic guitar (c. 1790 – 1880), and the earlier baroque guitars with five courses.

The materials and the methods of classical guitar construction may vary, but the typical shape is either modern classical guitar or that historic classical guitar similar to the early romantic guitars of Spain, France and Italy. Classical guitar strings once made of gut are now made of materials such as nylon or fluoropolymers (especially PVDF), typically with silver-plated copper fine wire wound about the 3 lower-pitched strings, which are (descending) D, A and low E in standard tuning.

A guitar family tree may be identified. The flamenco guitar derives from the modern classical, but has differences in material, construction and sound.

== Contexts ==
The classical guitar has a long history and one is able to distinguish various:

- instruments
- repertoire (composers and their compositions, arrangements, improvisations)

Both instrument and repertoire can be viewed from a combination of various perspectives:

Historical (chronological period of time)

- Baroque guitar – 1600 to 1750
- Early romantic guitars – 1750 to 1850 (for music from the Classical and Romantic periods)
- Modern classical guitars

Geographical

- Spanish guitars (Torres), French guitars (René Lacôte, ...), German guitars (Hermann Hauser), etc.

Cultural

- Baroque court music, nineteenth-century opera and its influences, nineteenth-century folk songs, Latin American music

== Historical perspective ==
=== Early guitars ===
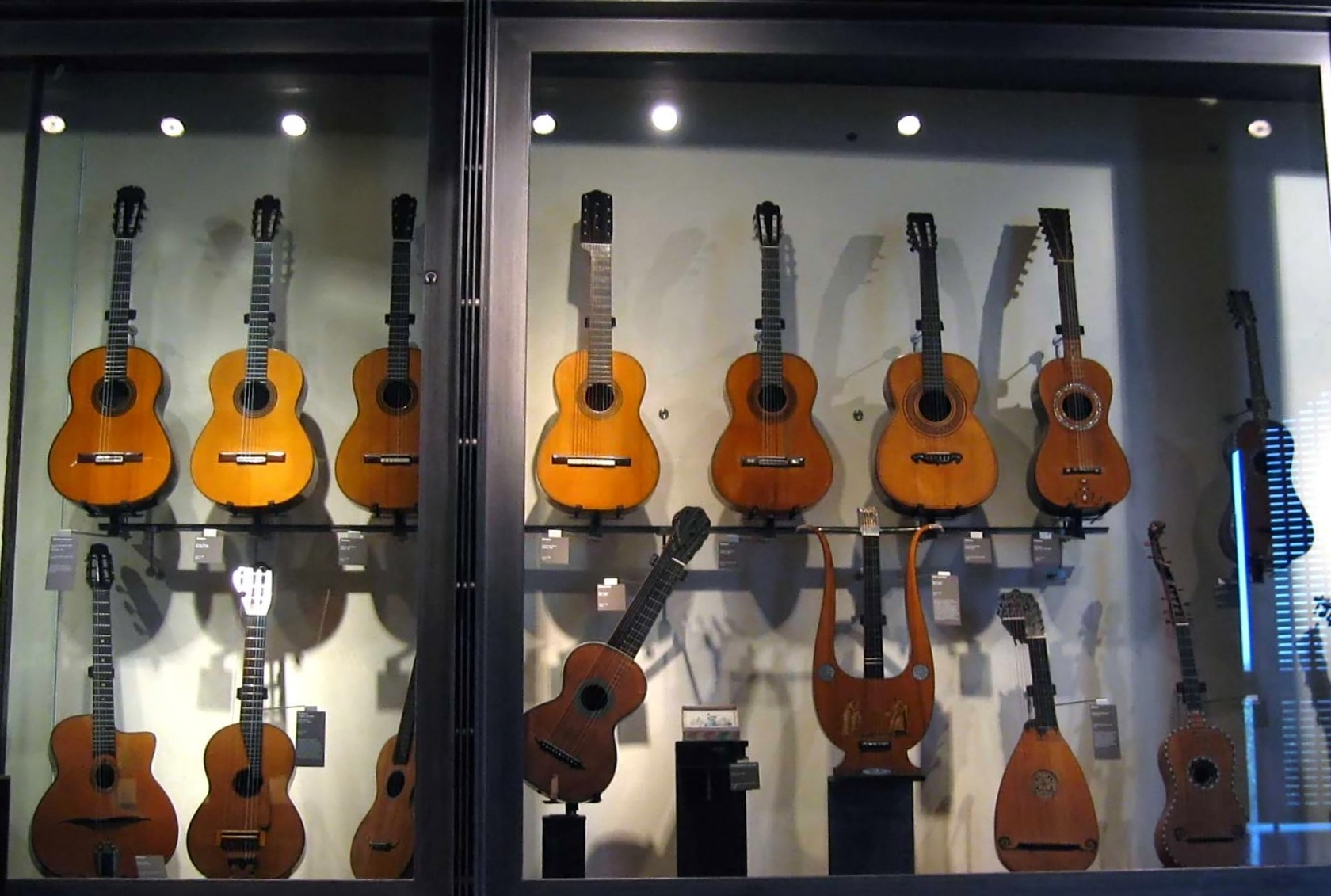
Guitars from the Museum Cité de la Musique in Paris (which houses almost 200 classical guitars)

While "classical guitar" is today mainly associated with the modern classical guitar design, there is an increasing interest in early guitars; and understanding the link between historical repertoire and the particular period guitar that was originally used to perform this repertoire. The musicologist and author Graham Wade writes:

Nowadays it is customary to play this repertoire on reproductions of instruments authentically modelled on concepts of musicological research with appropriate adjustments to techniques and overall interpretation. Thus over recent decades we have become accustomed to specialist artists with expertise in the art of vihuela (a 16th-century type of guitar popular in Spain), lute, Baroque guitar, 19th-century guitar, etc.

Different types of guitars have different sound aesthetics, e.g. different colour-spectrum characteristics (the way the sound energy is spread in the fundamental frequency and the overtones), different response, etc. These differences are due to differences in construction; for example, modern classical guitars usually use a different bracing (fan-bracing) from that used in earlier guitars (they had ladder-bracing); and a different voicing was used by the luthier. Equally, playability varies: baroque guitars, for example, may have as few as nine frets clear of the body, hampering performance of certain repertoire.

There is a historical parallel between musical styles (baroque, classical, romantic, flamenco, jazz) and the style of "sound aesthetic" of the musical instruments used, for example: Robert de Visée played a baroque guitar with a very different sound aesthetic from the guitars used by Mauro Giuliani and Luigi Legnani: they used 19th-century guitars. These guitars in turn sound different from the Torres models used by Segovia that are suited for interpretations of romantic-modern works such as Moreno Torroba.

When considering the guitar from a historical perspective, the musical instrument used is as important as the musical language and style of the particular period. As an example: It is impossible to play a historically informed de Visee or Corbetta (baroque guitarist-composers) on a modern classical guitar. The reason is that the baroque guitar used courses, which are two strings close together (in unison), that are plucked together. This gives baroque guitars an unmistakable sound characteristic and tonal texture that is an integral part of an interpretation. Additionally, the sound aesthetic of the baroque guitar (with its strong overtone presence) is very different from modern classical type guitars, as is shown below.

Today's use of Torres and post-Torres type guitars for repertoire of all periods is sometimes critically viewed: Torres and post-Torres style modern guitars (with their fan-bracing and design) have a thick and strong tone, very suitable for modern-era repertoire. However, they are considered to emphasize the fundamental too heavily (at the expense of overtone partials) for earlier repertoire (Classical/Romantic: Carulli, Sor, Giuliani, Mertz, ...; Baroque: de Visee, ...; etc.). "Andrés Segovia presented the Spanish guitar as a versatile model for all playing styles" to the extent, that still today, "many guitarists have tunnel-vision of the world of the guitar, coming from the modern Segovia tradition".

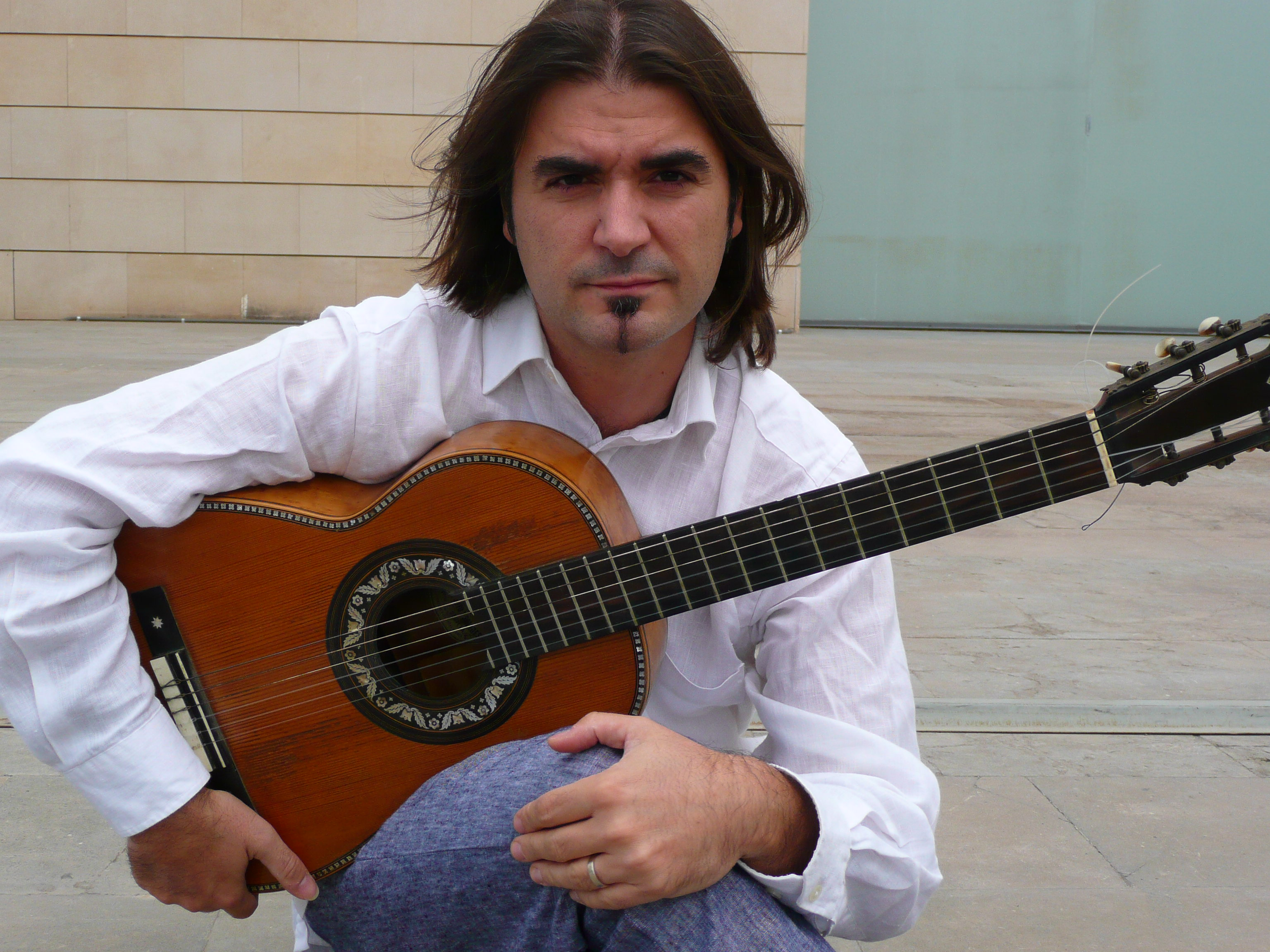
19th century guitar made by Manuel de Soto y Solares, held by Spanish guitarist Rafael Serrallet

While fan-braced modern classical Torres and post-Torres style instruments coexisted with traditional ladder-braced guitars at the beginning of the 20th century, the older forms eventually fell away. Some attribute this to the popularity of Segovia, considering him "the catalyst for change toward the Spanish design and the so-called 'modern' school in the 1920s and beyond." The styles of music performed on ladder-braced guitars were becoming unfashionable—and, e.g., in Germany, more musicians were turning towards folk music (Schrammel-music and the Contraguitar). This was localized in Germany and Austria and became unfashionable again. On the other hand, Segovia was playing concerts around the world, popularizing modern classical guitar—and, in the 1920s, Spanish romantic-modern style with guitar works by Moreno Torroba, de Falla, etc.

The 19th-century classical guitarist Francisco Tárrega first popularized the Torres design as a classical solo instrument. However, some maintain that Segovia's influence led to its domination over other designs. Factories around the world began producing them in large numbers.

==== Characteristics ====
- Vihuela, renaissance guitars and baroque guitars have a bright sound, rich in overtones, and their courses (double strings) give the sound a very particular texture.
- Early guitars of the classical and romantic period (early romantic guitars) have single strings, but their design and voicing are still such that they have their tonal energy more in the overtones (but without starved fundamental), giving a bright intimate tone.
- Later in Spain a style of music emerged that favoured a stronger fundamental:
  "With the change of music a stronger fundamental was demanded and the fan bracing system was approached. ... the guitar tone has been changed from a transparent tone, rich in higher partials to a more 'broad' tone with a strong fundamental."
- Thus modern guitars with fan bracing (fan strutting) have a design and voicing that gives them a thick, heavy sound, with far more tonal energy found in the fundamental.

== Style periods ==
=== Renaissance ===
Composers of the Renaissance period who wrote for four-course guitar include Alonso Mudarra, Miguel de Fuenllana, Adrian Le Roy, Grégoire Brayssing, Guillaume de Morlaye, and Simon Gorlier.

Instrument

Four-course guitar

=== Baroque ===
Some well known composers of the Baroque guitar were Gaspar Sanz, Robert de Visée, Francesco Corbetta and Santiago de Murcia.

Examples of instruments

- Baroque guitar by Nicolas Alexandre Voboam II: This French instrument has the typical design of the period with five courses of double-strings and a flat back.
- Baroque guitar attributed to Matteo Sellas : This Italian instrument has five courses and a rounded back.

=== Classical and romantic ===
From approximately 1780 to 1850, the guitar had numerous composers and performers including:

- Filippo Gragnani (1767–1820)
- Antoine de Lhoyer (1768–1852)
- Ferdinando Carulli (1770–1841)
- Wenzel Thomas Matiegka (1773–1830)
- Francesco Molino (1774–1847)
- Fernando Sor (1778–1839)
- Luigi Moretti (c. 1780 – 1850)
- Mauro Giuliani (1781–1829)
- Niccolò Paganini (1782–1840)
- Dionisio Aguado (1784–1849)
- Luigi Legnani (1790–1877)
- Matteo Carcassi (1792–1853)
- Napoléon Coste (1805–1883)
- Johann Kaspar Mertz (1806–1856)
- Giulio Regondi (1822–1872)

Hector Berlioz studied the guitar as a teenager; Franz Schubert owned at least two and wrote for the instrument; and Ludwig van Beethoven, after hearing Giuliani play, commented the instrument was "a miniature orchestra in itself". Niccolò Paganini was also a guitar virtuoso and composer. He once wrote: "I love the guitar for its harmony; it is my constant companion in all my travels". He also said, on another occasion: "I do not like this instrument, but regard it simply as a way of helping me to think."

=== Francisco Tárrega ===
The guitarist and composer Francisco Tárrega (November 21, 1852 – December 15, 1909) was one of the great guitar virtuosos and teachers and is considered the father of modern classical guitar playing. As a professor of guitar at the conservatories of Madrid and Barcelona, he defined many elements of the modern classical technique and elevated the importance of the guitar in the classical music tradition. Tárrega popularised the guitars of Antonio de Torres Jurado and extended the repertoire with numerous transcriptions, notably of Bach's lute works. Tárrega played with nails until the age of fifty, when he cut his nails to produce a softer sound (biographer Domingo Prat has argued that he may have had a medical condition that weakened his nails, though his student Emilio Pujol insists it was a conscious tonal choice). Tarrega suffered a stroke three years before his death that left his right hand partially paralysed.

=== Modern period ===
At the beginning of the 1920s, Andrés Segovia popularized the guitar with tours and early phonograph recordings. Segovia collaborated with the composers Federico Moreno Torroba and Joaquín Turina with the aim of extending the guitar repertoire with new music. Segovia's tour of South America revitalized public interest in the guitar and helped the guitar music of Manuel Ponce and Heitor Villa-Lobos reach a wider audience. The composers Alexandre Tansman and Mario Castelnuovo-Tedesco were commissioned by Segovia to write new pieces for the guitar. Luiz Bonfá popularized Brazilian musical styles such as the newly created Bossa Nova, which was well received by audiences in the USA.

==== "New music" – avant-garde ====
The classical guitar repertoire also includes modern contemporary works – sometimes termed "New Music" – such as Elliott Carter's Changes, Cristóbal Halffter's Codex I, Luciano Berio's Sequenza XI, Maurizio Pisati's Sette Studi, Maurice Ohana's Si Le Jour Paraît, Sylvano Bussotti's Rara (eco sierologico), Ernst Krenek's Suite für Guitarre allein, Op. 164, Franco Donatoni's Algo: Due pezzi per chitarra, Paolo Coggiola's Variazioni Notturne, etc.

Performers who are known for including modern repertoire include Jürgen Ruck, Elena Càsoli, Leo Brouwer (when he was still performing), John Schneider, Reinbert Evers, Maria Kämmerling, Siegfried Behrend, David Starobin, Mats Scheidegger, Magnus Andersson, etc.

This type of repertoire is usually performed by guitarists who have particularly chosen to focus on the avant-garde in their performances.

Within the contemporary music scene itself, there are also works which are generally regarded as extreme. These include works such as Brian Ferneyhough's Kurze Schatten II, Sven-David Sandström's away from and Rolf Riehm's Toccata Orpheus etc. which are notorious for their extreme difficulty.

There are also a variety of databases documenting modern guitar works such as Sheer Pluck and others.

The evolution of the classical guitar and its repertoire spans more than four centuries. It has a history that was shaped by contributions from earlier instruments, such as the lute, the vihuela, and the baroque guitar.

The last guitarist to follow in Segovia's footsteps was Julian Bream and Julian Bream will be 73 years old on July 15th 2006. Miguel Llobet, Andrés Segovia and Julian Bream are the three performer personalities of the 20th century. Do not understand me wrong, we have many guitarists today that are very excellent performers, but none with such a distinct personality in their tone and style as Llobet, Segovia and Bream. In all instrumental areas, not just the guitar, there is a lack of individualism with a strong tendency to conformity. This I find very unfortunate since art (music, theatre or the pictorial arts) is a very individual and personal matter.

— Bernard Hebb, Interview

== History ==
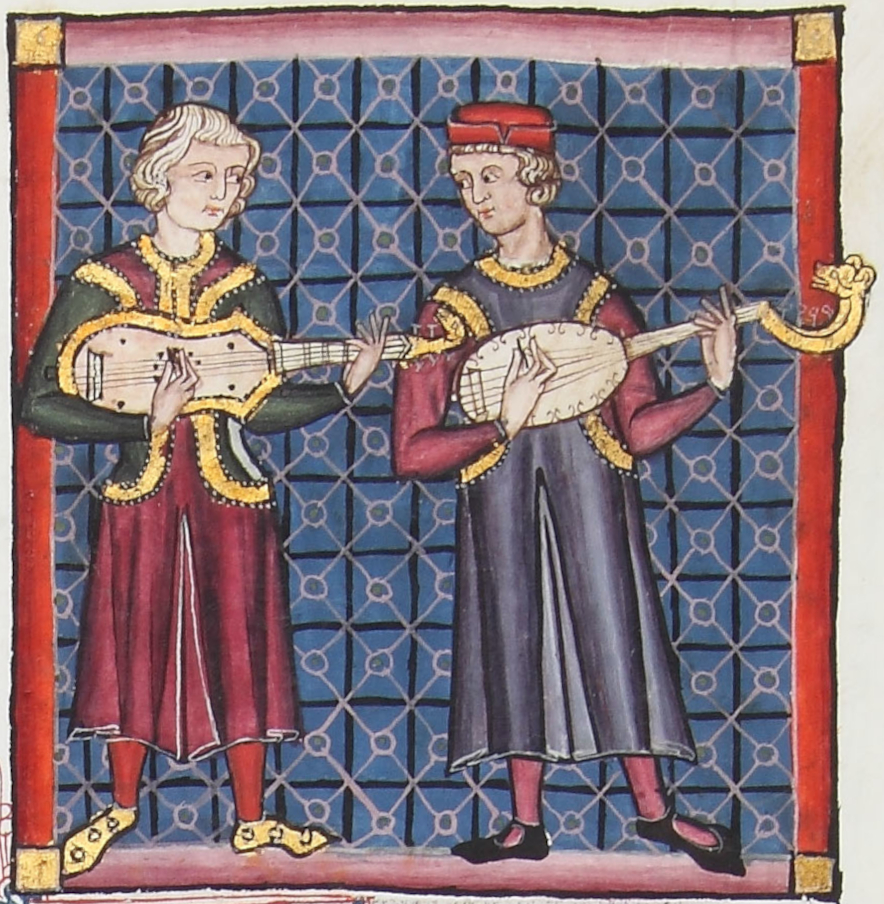
Guitarra Latina (left) and
Guitarra Morisca (right)

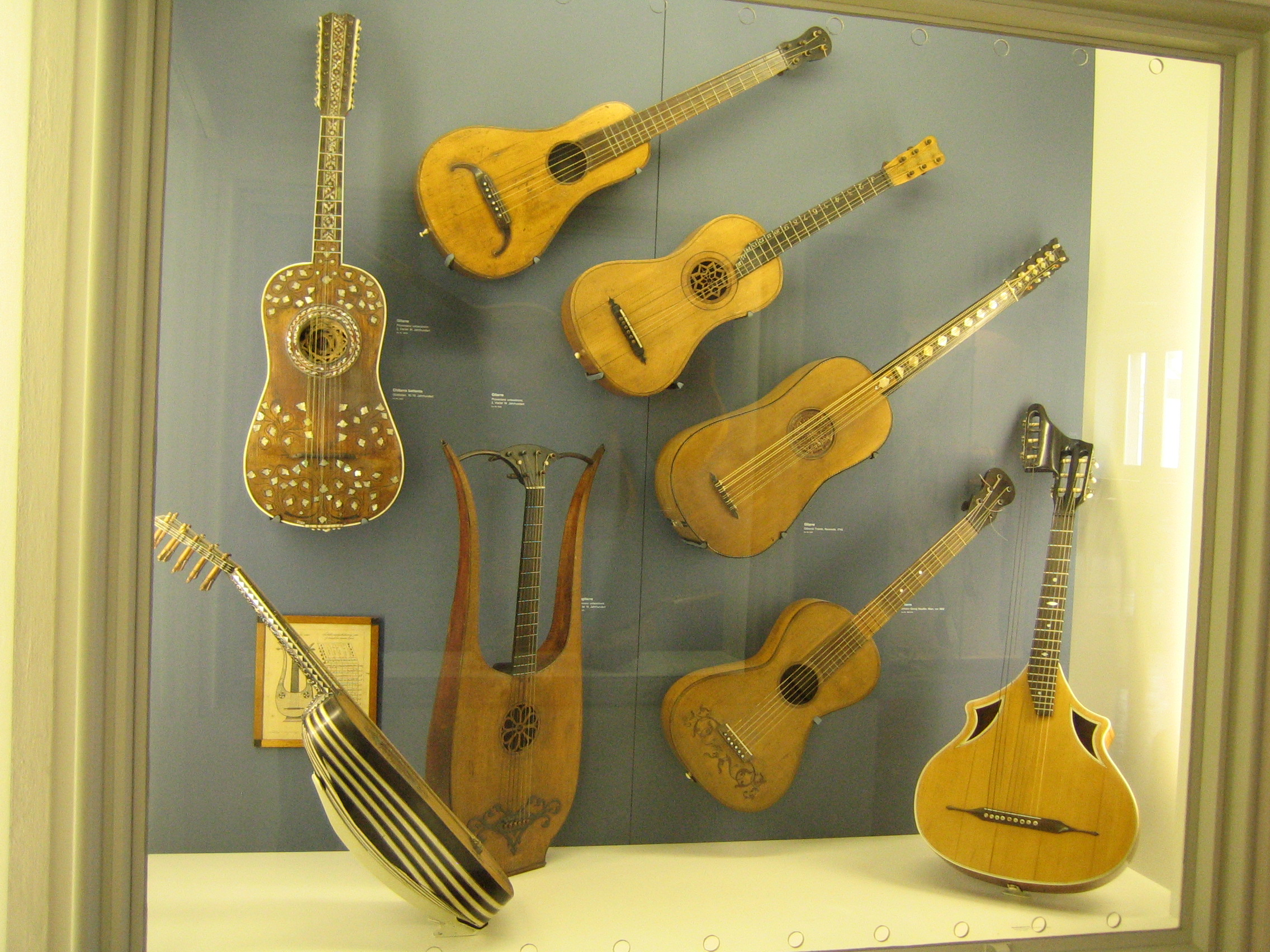
History of guitars
(exhibited at Deutsches Museum)

=== Overview of the classical guitar's history ===
The origins of the modern guitar are not known with certainty. Some believe it is indigenous to Europe, while others think it is an imported instrument. Guitar-like instruments appear in ancient carvings and statues recovered from Egyptian, Sumerian, and Babylonian civilizations. This means that contemporary Iranian instruments such as the tanbur and setar are distantly related to the European guitar, as they all derive ultimately from the same ancient origins, but by very different historical routes and influences. Gitterns called "guitars" were already in use since the 13th century, but their construction and tuning were different from modern guitars. The time where the most changes were made to the guitar was in the 1500s to the 1800s.

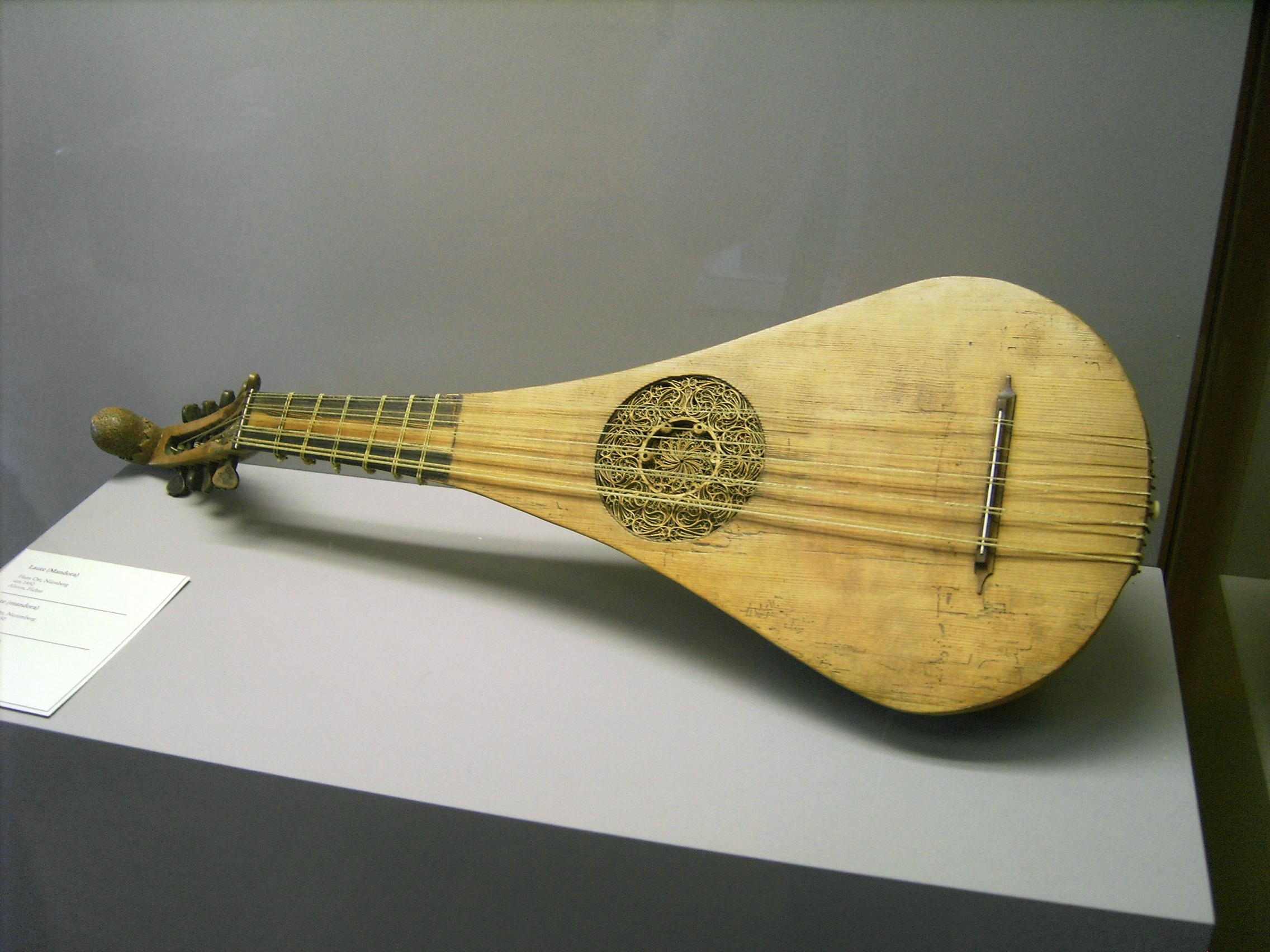
Gittern (1450)

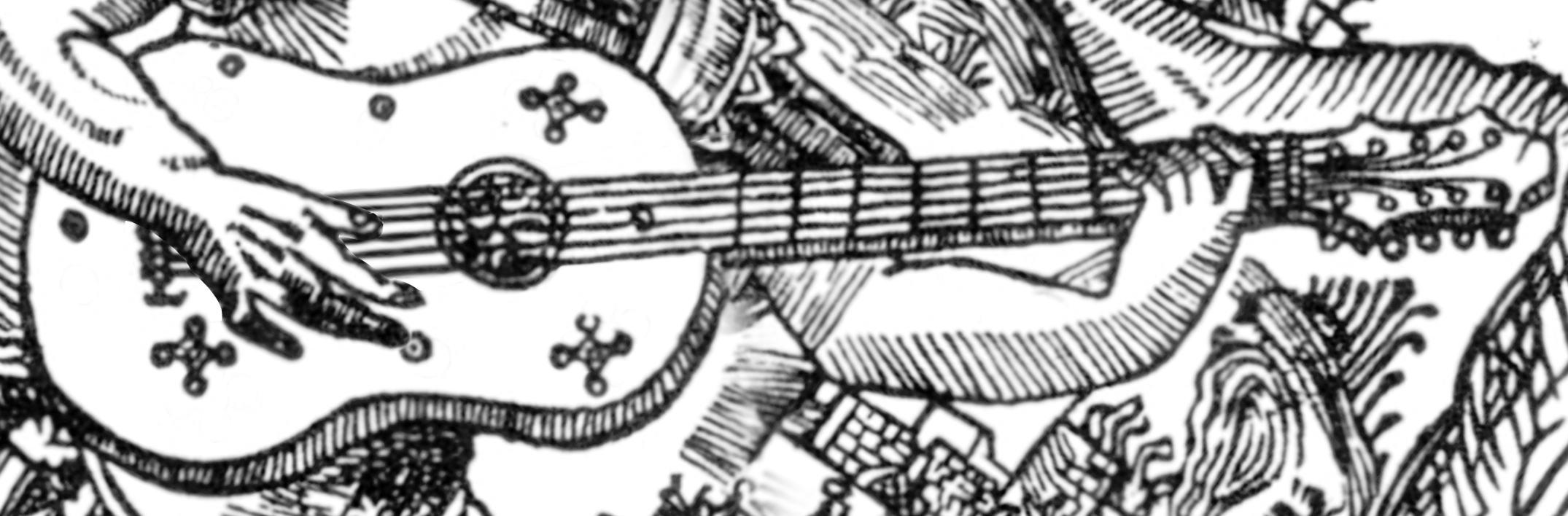
Vihuela
(vihuela book by Luis Milan, 1536)

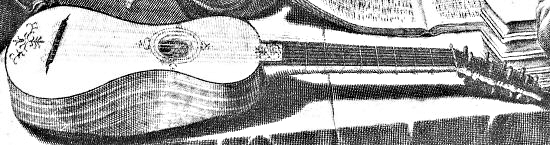
Baroque guitar with rounded-back
(engraving by Etienne Picart, 1680)

=== Renaissance guitar ===
Alonso de Mudarra's book Tres Libros de Música, published in Spain in 1546, contains the earliest known written pieces for a four-course guitarra. This four-course "guitar" was popular in France, Spain, and Italy. In France this instrument gained popularity among aristocrats. A considerable volume of music was published in Paris from the 1550s to the 1570s: Simon Gorlier's Le Troysième Livre... mis en tablature de Guiterne was published in 1551. In 1551 Adrian Le Roy also published his Premier Livre de Tablature de Guiterne, and in the same year he also published Briefve et facile instruction pour apprendre la tablature a bien accorder, conduire, et disposer la main sur la Guiterne. Robert Ballard, Grégoire Brayssing from Augsburg, and Guillaume Morlaye (c. 1510 – c. 1558) significantly contributed to its repertoire. Morlaye's Le Premier Livre de Chansons, Gaillardes, Pavannes, Bransles, Almandes, Fantasies – which has a four-course instrument illustrated on its title page – was published in partnership with Michel Fedenzat, and among other music, they published six books of tablature by lutenist Albert de Rippe (who was very likely Guillaume's teacher).

=== Vihuela ===
The written history of the classical guitar can be traced back to the early 16th century with the development of the vihuela in Spain. While the lute was then becoming popular in other parts of Europe, the Spaniards did not take to it well because of its association with the Moors. Instead, the lute-like vihuela appeared with two more strings that gave it more range and complexity. In its most developed form, the vihuela was a guitar-like instrument with six double strings made of gut, tuned like a modern classical guitar with the exception of the third string, which was tuned half a step lower (a tuning still surviving in some Renaissance and Baroque arrangements). It has a high sound and is rather large to hold. Few have survived and most of what is known today come from diagrams and paintings.

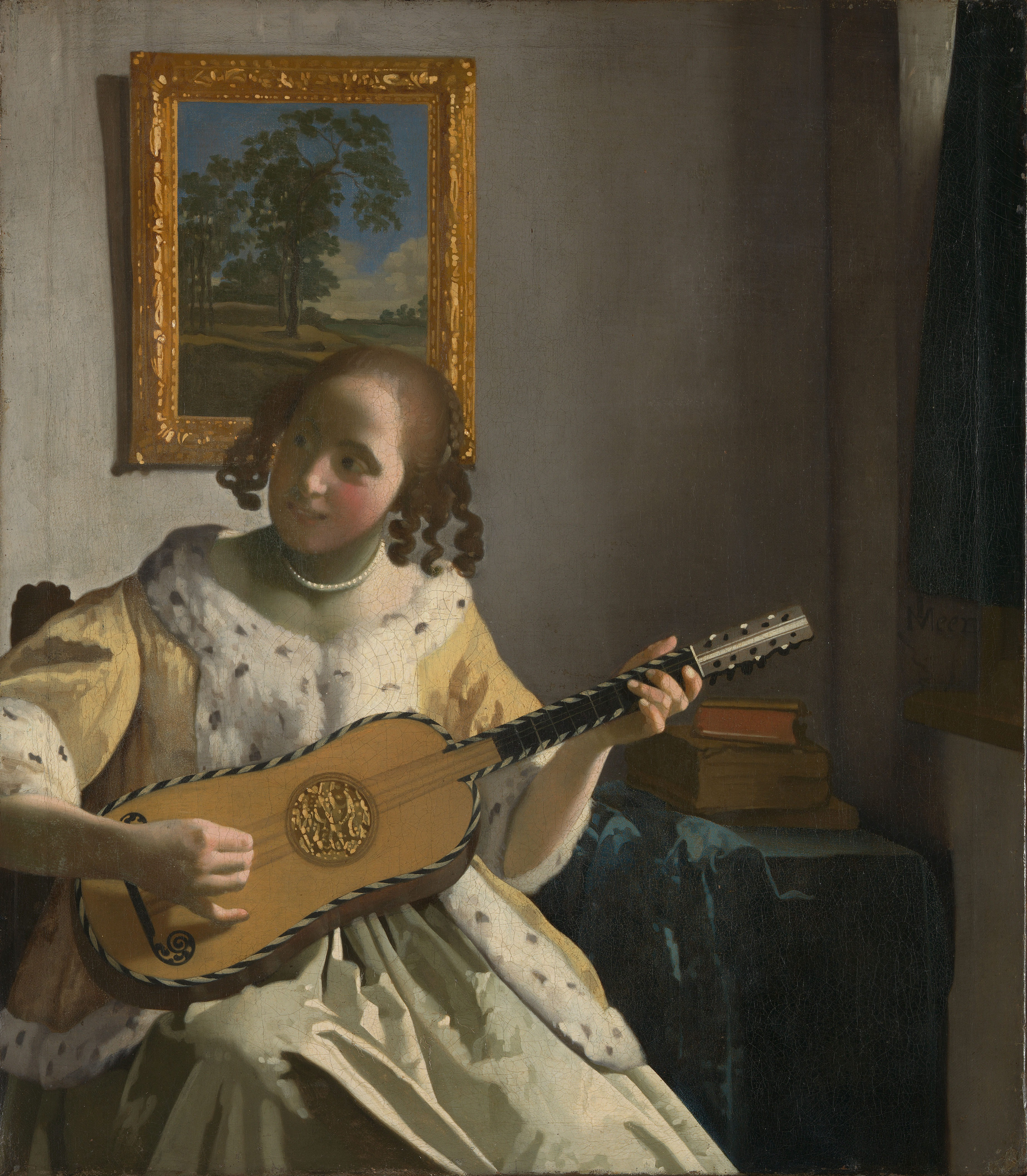
Baroque guitar on The Guitar Player (c. 1672), by Johannes Vermeer

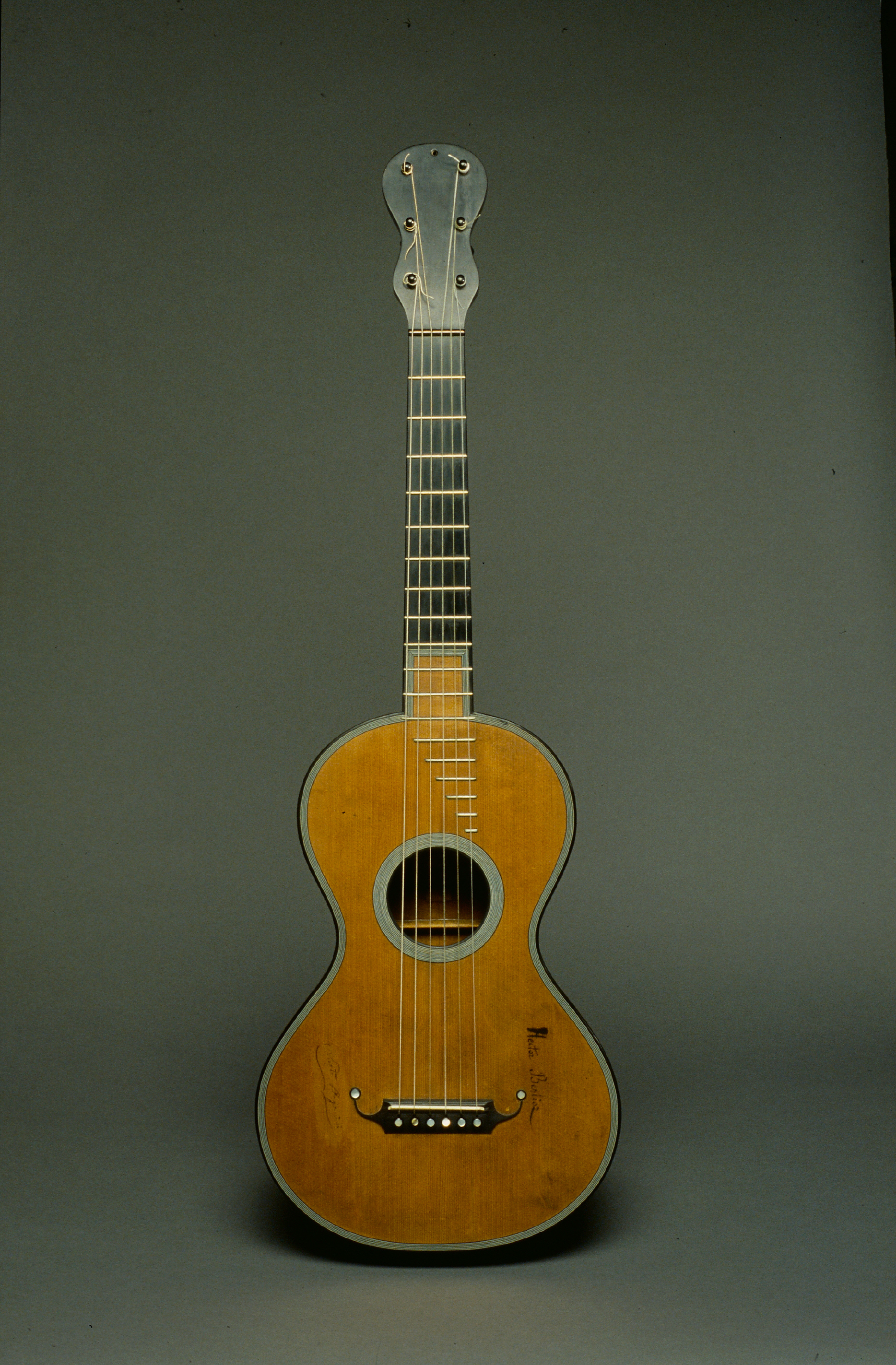
Early romantic guitar by Jean-Nicolas Grobert (1830)

=== Baroque guitar ===
Baroque guitars were frequently ornate with detailed inlays or papier-mache cones in the sound holes. In order to be played in different temperaments, frets were often also made of gut and could be repositioned.

=== "Early romantic guitar" or "Guitar during the Classical music era" ===
The earliest extant six-string guitar is believed to have been built in 1779 by Gaetano Vinaccia (1759 – after 1831) in Naples, Italy; however, the date on the label is a little ambiguous. The Vinaccia family of luthiers is known for developing the mandolin. This guitar has been examined and does not show tell-tale signs of modifications from a double-course guitar. The authenticity of guitars allegedly produced before the 1790s is often in question. This also corresponds to when Moretti's 6-string method appeared, in 1792.

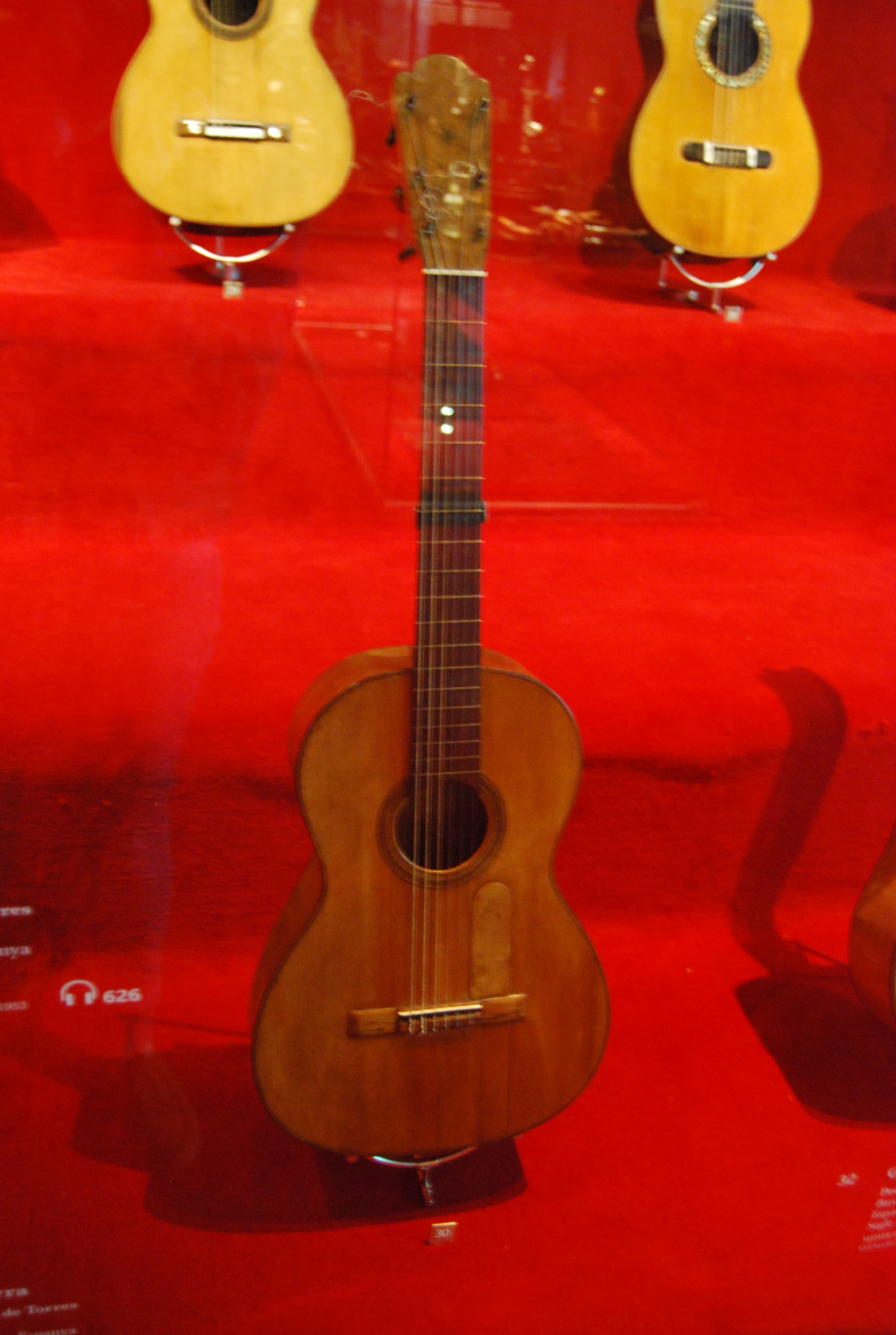
Spanish guitar by Antonio de Torres Jurado (1862)

Smallman played by John Williams in 2008

=== Modern classical guitar ===
The modern classical guitar was developed in the 19th century by Antonio de Torres Jurado, Ignacio Fleta, Hermann Hauser Sr., and Robert Bouchet. The Spanish luthier and player Antonio de Torres gave the modern classical guitar its definitive form, with a broadened body, increased waist curve, thinned belly, and improved internal bracing. The modern classical guitar replaced an older form for the accompaniment of song and dance called flamenco, and a modified version, known as the flamenco guitar, was created.

=== American Classical Guitar Music ===
American classical guitar music represents a distinctive evolution within the classical guitar tradition in the United States. It blends European classical techniques with elements from American folk, blues, and other local musical styles. Pioneering figures such as Justin Holland and William Foden laid the groundwork, while later innovators like Aaron Shearer, Christopher Parkening, and Jason Vieaux have significantly influenced performance practices, pedagogy, and repertoire in America. For more detailed information on this American evolution, please see the article on American Classical Guitar Music.

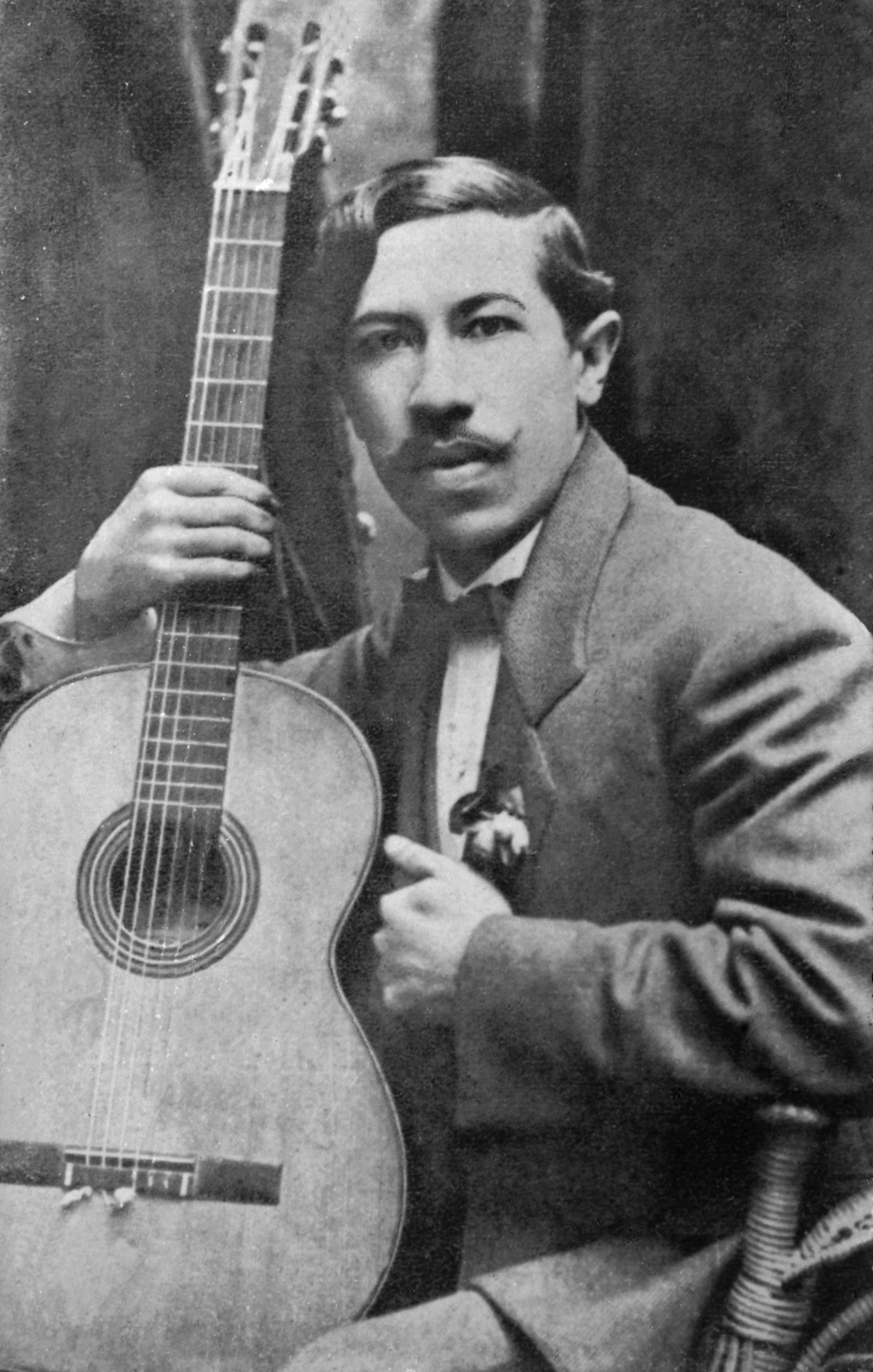
Eminent Paraguayan classical guitarist and composer Agustín Barrios

== Performance ==
Popular song (public domain): Spanish Romance.

The modern classical guitar is usually played in a seated position, with the instrument resting on the left lap – and the left foot placed on a footstool. Alternatively – if a footstool is not used – a guitar support can be placed between the guitar and the left lap (the support usually attaches to the instrument's side with suction cups). (There are of course exceptions, with some performers choosing to hold the instrument another way.)

Right-handed players use the fingers of the right hand to pluck the strings, with the thumb plucking from the top of a string downwards and the other fingers plucking from the bottom of the string upwards. The little finger in classical technique as it evolved in the 20th century is used only to ride along with the ring finger without striking the strings and to thus physiologically facilitate the ring finger's motion.

In contrast, Flamenco technique, and classical compositions evoking Flamenco, employ the little finger semi-independently in the Flamenco four-finger rasgueado, the rapid sequential strumming of the string by the fingers in reverse order employing the back of the fingernail common to Flamenco.

Flamenco technique, in the performance of the rasgueado also uses the upstroke of the four fingers and the downstroke of the thumb: the string is hit not only with the inner, fleshy side of the fingertip but also with the outer, fingernail side. This was also used in a technique of the vihuela called dedillo which has recently begun to be introduced on the classical guitar.

Some modern guitarists, such as Štěpán Rak and Kazuhito Yamashita, use the little finger independently, compensating for the little finger's shortness by maintaining an extremely long fingernail. Rak and Yamashita have also generalized the use of the upstroke of the four fingers and the downstroke of the thumb (the same technique as in the rasgueado of the Flamenco: as explained above the string is hit not only with the inner, fleshy side of the fingertip but also with the outer, fingernail side) both as a free stroke and as a rest stroke.

=== Direct contact with strings ===
As with other plucked instruments (such as the lute), the musician directly touches the strings (usually plucking) to produce the sound. This has important consequences: Different tone/timbre (of a single note) can be produced by plucking the string in different manners (apoyando, or 'rest stroke', in which the finger comes to rest on the next lowest string; or the more common tirando, or 'free stroke' in which the finger moves in a circular motion: tirando makes up the bulk of contact during regular playing, though novices are often taught apoyando first) and in different positions (such as closer (ponti) and further away from the guitar bridge (tasto)). .

=== Fingering notation ===
In guitar scores the five fingers of the right-hand (which pluck the strings) are designated by the first letter of their Spanish names namely p = thumb (pulgar), i = index finger (índice), m = middle finger (mayor), a = ring finger (anular), c = little finger or pinky (meñique/chiquito)

The four fingers of the left hand (which fret the strings) are designated 1 = index, 2 = major, 3 = ring finger, 4 = little finger. 0 designates an open string: a string not stopped by a finger and whose full length thus vibrates when plucked. It is rare to use the left hand thumb in performance, the neck of a classical guitar being too wide for comfort, and normal technique keeps the thumb behind the neck. However Johann Kaspar Mertz, for example, is notable for specifying the thumb to fret bass notes on the sixth string, notated with an up arrowhead (⌃). The upwards arrowhead was used by Julio Sagreras to indicate apoyando, especially with the a finger.

Scores (contrary to tablatures) do not systematically indicate the string to pluck (though the choice is usually obvious). When indicating the string is useful, the score uses the numbers 1 to 6 inside circles (highest-pitch sting to lowest).

Scores do not systematically indicate fretboard positions (where to put the first finger of the fretting hand), but when helpful (mostly with barrés chords) the score indicates positions with Roman numerals from the first position I (index finger on the 1st fret: F-B flat-E flat-A flat-C-F) to the twelfth position XII (index finger on the 12th fret: E-A-D-G-B-E. The 12th fret is where the body begins) or even higher up to position XIX (the classical guitar most often having 19 frets, with the 19th fret being most often split and not being usable to fret the 3rd and 4th strings). Scores vary as to whether a barré is indicated only with a Roman numeral, or a B (e.g. BVII, from barré) or C (e.g. CVII, from cejillo). To indicate a partial barré (usually three strings, but as few as two and as many as five), ₵ can be used, or the B or C can be preceded by a fraction, such as ½ or, less commonly, ³/₆ or ²/₆.

=== Alternation ===
To achieve tremolo effects and rapid, fluent scale passages, the player must practice alternation, that is, never plucking a string with the same finger twice in a row. Using p to indicate the thumb, i the index finger, m the middle finger and a the ring finger, common alternation patterns include:

- i-m-i-m : Basic melody line on the treble strings. Has the appearance of "walking along the strings". This is often used for playing Scale (music) passages.
- p-i-m-a-i-m-a : Arpeggio pattern example. However, there are many arpeggio patterns incorporated into the classical guitar repertoire.
- p-a-m-i-p-a-m-i : Classical guitar tremolo pattern.
- p-m-p-m : A way of playing a melody line on the lower strings.

== Repertoire ==
Music written specifically for the classical guitar dates from the addition of the sixth string (the baroque guitar normally had five pairs of strings) in the late 18th century.

A guitar recital may include a variety of works, e.g., works written originally for the lute or vihuela by composers such as John Dowland (b. England 1563) and Luis de Narváez (b. Spain c. 1500), and also music written for the harpsichord by Domenico Scarlatti (b. Italy 1685), for the baroque lute by Sylvius Leopold Weiss (b. Germany 1687), for the baroque guitar by Robert de Visée (b. France c. 1650) or even Spanish-flavored music written for the piano by Isaac Albéniz (b. Spain 1860) and Enrique Granados (b. Spain 1867). The most important composer who did not write for the guitar but whose music is often played on it is Johann Sebastian Bach (b. Germany 1685), whose baroque lute, violin, and cello works have proved highly adaptable to the instrument.

Of music written originally for guitar, the earliest important composers are from the classical period and include Fernando Sor (b. Spain 1778) and Mauro Giuliani (b. Italy 1781), both of whom wrote in a style strongly influenced by Viennese classicism. In the 19th-century guitar composers such as Johann Kaspar Mertz (b. Slovakia, Austria 1806) were strongly influenced by the dominance of the piano. Not until the end of the nineteenth century did the guitar begin to establish its own unique identity. Francisco Tárrega (b. Spain 1852) was central to this, sometimes incorporating stylized aspects of flamenco's Moorish influences into his romantic miniatures, though he refrained from the use of rasagueado and other endemic flamenco techniques. Angel Barrios, on the other hand, did create fusions of salon guitar and flamenco styles. This was part of late 19th century mainstream European musical nationalism. Albéniz and Granados were central to this movement; transcriptions of their work was so successful that their compositions have been absorbed into the standard guitar repertoire, most notably Albéniz' Asturias as arranged by Segovia and Granados' Suite Española.

The steel-string and electric guitars characteristic to the rise of rock and roll in the post-WWII era became more widely played in North America and the English-speaking world. Agustín Barrios Mangoré of Paraguay composed many works and brought into the mainstream the characteristics of Latin American music, as did the Brazilian composer Heitor Villa-Lobos. Andrés Segovia commissioned works from Spanish composers such as Federico Moreno Torroba and Joaquín Rodrigo, Italians such as Mario Castelnuovo-Tedesco and Latin American composers such as Manuel Ponce of Mexico. Other prominent Latin American composers are Leo Brouwer and Yalil Guerra of Cuba, Antonio Lauro of Venezuela and Enrique Solares of Guatemala. Julian Bream of Britain managed to get nearly every British composer from William Walton and Benjamin Britten to Peter Maxwell Davies to write significant works for guitar. Bream's collaborations with tenor Peter Pears also resulted in song cycles by Britten, Lennox Berkeley and others. There are significant works by composers such as Hans Werner Henze of Germany, Gilbert Biberian of England and Roland Chadwick of Australia.

The classical guitar also became more frequent in popular music and rock & roll in the 1960s after guitarist Mason Williams popularized the instrument in his instrumental hit Classical Gas. Guitarist Christopher Parkening is quoted in the book Classical Gas: The Music of Mason Williams as saying that it is the most requested guitar piece besides Malagueña and perhaps the best-known instrumental guitar piece today. In the field of New Flamenco, the works and performances of Spanish composer and player Paco de Lucía are known worldwide.

Not many classical guitar concertos were written through history. Nevertheless, some guitar concertos are nowadays widely known and popular, especially Joaquín Rodrigo's Concierto de Aranjuez (with the famous theme from 2nd movement) and Fantasía para un gentilhombre. Composers, who also wrote famous guitar concertos are: Antonio Vivaldi (originally for mandolin or lute), Mauro Giuliani, Heitor Villa-Lobos, Mario Castelnuovo-Tedesco, Manuel Ponce, Leo Brouwer, Lennox Berkeley and Malcolm Arnold. Contemporary guitar concertos are growing more common, among them Bosco Sacro by Federico Biscione, for guitar and string orchestra.

== Physical characteristics ==
The classical guitar is distinguished by a number of characteristics:

- It is an acoustic instrument. The sound of the plucked string is amplified by the soundboard and resonant cavity of the guitar.
- It has six strings, though some classical guitars have seven or more strings.
- All six strings are made from nylon, or nylon wrapped with metal, as opposed to the metal strings found on other acoustic guitars. Nylon strings also have a much lower tension than steel strings, as do the predecessors to nylon strings, gut strings (made from ox or sheep gut). The lower three strings ('bass strings') are wound with metal, commonly silver-plated copper.
- Because of the low string tension
  - The neck can be made entirely of wood without a steel truss rod
  - The interior bracing can be lighter
- Typical modern six-string classical guitars are 48–54 mm wide at the nut, compared to around 42 mm for electric guitars.
- Classical fingerboards are normally flat and without inlaid fret markers, or just have dot inlays on the side of the neck—steel string fingerboards usually have a slight radius and inlays.
- Classical guitarists use their right hand to pluck the strings. Players may shape their fingernails for a brighter tone and feel against the strings.
- Strumming is a less common technique in classical guitar, and is often referred to by the Spanish term "rasgueo", or for strumming patterns "rasgueado", and uses the backs of the fingernails. Rasgueado is integral to Flamenco guitar.
- Machine heads at the headstock of a classical guitar point backwards—in contrast to most steel-string guitars, which have machine heads that point outward.
- The overall design of a Classical Guitar is very similar to the slightly lighter and smaller Flamenco guitar.

=== Parts ===
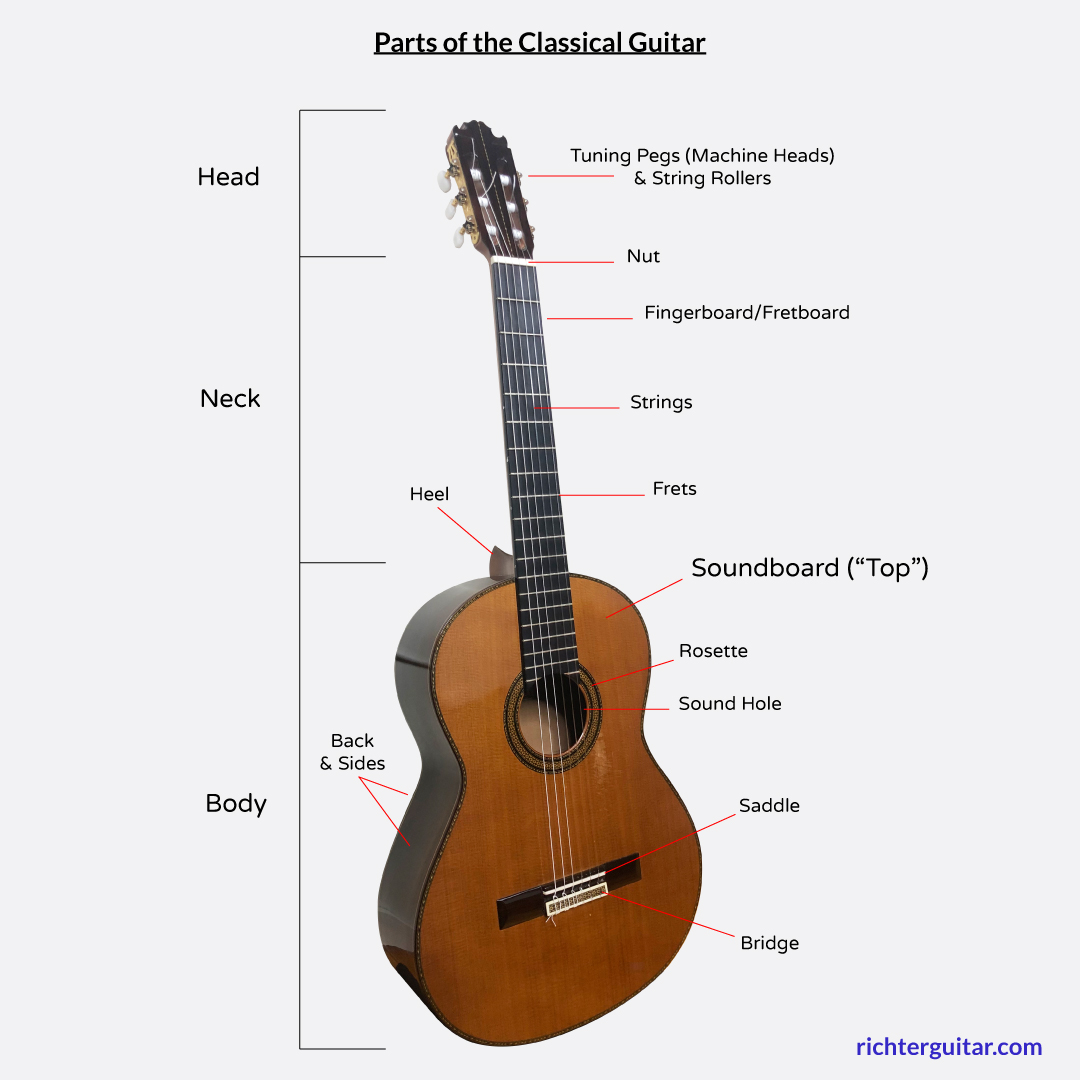
Diagram showing exterior parts of the classical guitar

Parts of typical classical guitars include:

- Headstock
- Nut
- Machine heads (or pegheads, tuning keys, tuning machines, tuners)
- Frets
- Neck
- Heel
- Body
- Bridge
- Bottom deck
- Soundboard
- Body sides
- Sound hole, with rosette inlay
- Strings
- Saddle (Bridge nut)
- Fretboard

==== Fretboard ====
The fretboard (also called the fingerboard) is a piece of wood embedded with metal frets that constitutes the top of the neck. It is flat or slightly curved. The curvature of the fretboard is measured by the fretboard radius, which is the radius of a hypothetical circle of which the fretboard's surface constitutes a segment. The smaller the fretboard radius, the more noticeably curved the fretboard is. Fretboards are most commonly made of ebony, but may also be made of rosewood, some other hardwood, or of phenolic composite ("micarta").

==== Frets ====
Frets are the metal strips (usually nickel alloy or stainless steel) embedded along the fingerboard and placed at points that divide the length of string mathematically. The strings' vibrating length is determined when the strings are pressed down behind the frets. Each fret produces a different pitch and each pitch spaced a half-step apart on the 12 tone scale. The ratio of the widths of two consecutive frets is the twelfth root of two ($\sqrt[12]{2}$), whose numeric value is about 1.059463. The twelfth fret divides the string into two exact halves and the 24th fret (if present) divides the string in half yet again. Every twelve frets represents one octave. This arrangement of frets results in equal tempered tuning.

==== Strings ====
Until 1948, guitars were most often strung with animal gut (ox or sheep) or silk. Following the Second World War, luthier Albert Augustine commissioned nylon strings from the DuPont company, nylon being in surplus having been used as parachute wire, and Andres Segovia became a convert to nylon and publicised nylon strings. Nylon strings are considered brighter and louder than gut, though gut are still favoured by some performers, especially of Baroque music. Recent alternatives include carbon composite and fluorocarbons. The most popular classical guitar strings worldwide are the D'Addario EJ45 Normal Tension.

==== Neck ====
A classical guitar's frets, fretboard, tuners, headstock, all attached to a long wooden extension, collectively constitute its neck. The wood for the fretboard usually differs from the wood in the rest of the neck. The bending stress on the neck is considerable, particularly when heavier gauge strings are used. The most common scale length for classical guitar is 650mm (calculated by measuring the distance between the end of the nut and the center of the 12th fret, then doubling that measurement). However, scale lengths may vary from 635-664mm or more.

==== Neck joint or 'heel' ====
This is the point where the neck meets the body. In the traditional Spanish neck joint, the neck and block are one piece with the sides inserted into slots cut in the block. Other necks are built separately and joined to the body either with a dovetail joint, mortise or flush joint. These joints are usually glued and can be reinforced with mechanical fasteners. Recently many manufacturers use bolt-on fasteners. Bolt-on neck joints were once associated only with less expensive instruments but now some top manufacturers and hand builders are using variations of this method. Some people believed that the Spanish-style one piece neck/block and glued dovetail necks have better sustain, but testing has failed to confirm this. While most traditional Spanish style builders use the one-piece neck/heel block, Fleta, a prominent Spanish builder, used a dovetail joint due to the influence of his early training in violin making. One reason for the introduction of mechanical joints was to make it easier to repair necks. This is more of a problem with steel string guitars than with nylon strings, which have about half the string tension. This is why nylon string guitars often do not include a truss rod either.

==== Body ====
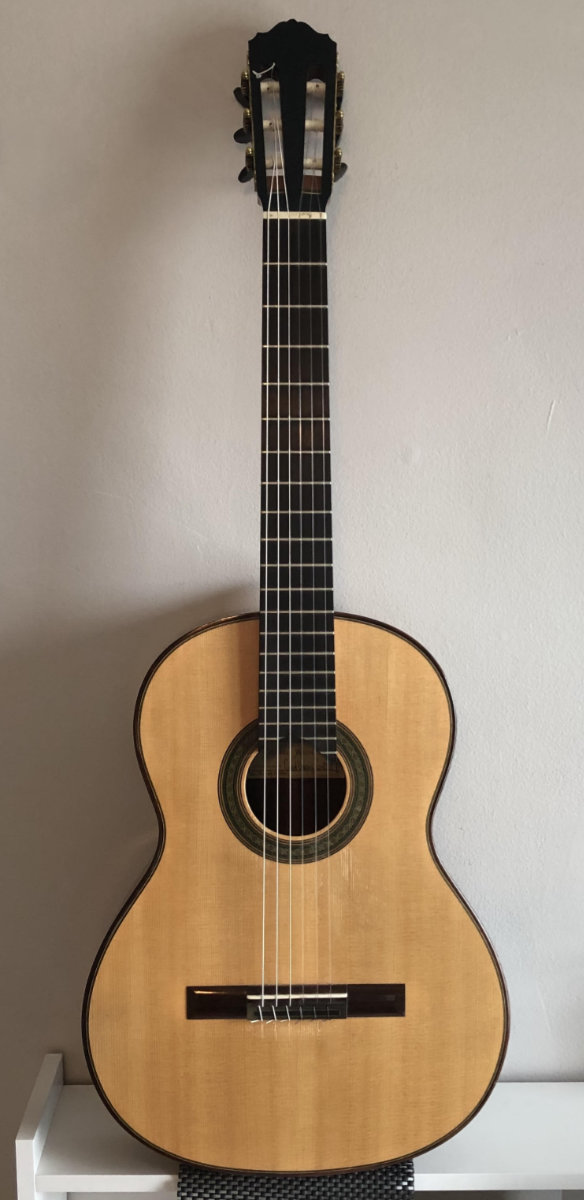
A photo of a contemporary "double-top" construction guitar made by Gernot Wagner in 2013 and owned by Jason Vieaux.

The body of the instrument is a major determinant of the overall sound variety for acoustic guitars. The guitar top, or soundboard, is a finely crafted and engineered element often made of spruce or red cedar. Considered the most prominent factor in determining the sound quality of a guitar, this thin (often 2 or 3mm thick - traditionally the thickness of two different coins) piece of wood has a uniform thickness and is strengthened by different types of internal bracing. The back is often made from rosewood and Brazilian rosewood is especially coveted, but mahogany or other decorative woods, especially walnut and ebony are sometimes used. Cheaper beginners' guitars may use ply or veneer for the sides to make mass machine production easier.

The majority of the sound is caused by the vibration of the guitar top as the energy of the vibrating strings is transferred to it. Different patterns of wood bracing have been used through the years by luthiers (Torres, Hauser, Ramírez, Fleta, and C.F. Martin being among the most influential designers of their times); to not only strengthen the top against collapsing under the tremendous stress exerted by the tensioned strings, but also to affect the resonance of the top. Some contemporary guitar makers have introduced new construction concepts such as "double-top" consisting of two extra-thin wooden plates separated by Nomex, or carbon-fiber reinforced lattice – pattern bracing. The back and sides are made out of a variety of woods such as mahogany, maple, cypress Indian rosewood and highly regarded Brazilian rosewood (Dalbergia nigra). Each one is chosen for its aesthetic effect and structural strength, and such choice can also play a role in determining the instrument's timbre. These are also strengthened with internal bracing, and decorated with inlays and purfling. Antonio de Torres Jurado proved that it was the top, and not the back and sides of the guitar that gave the instrument its sound, in 1862 he built a guitar with back and sides of papier-mâché. (This guitar resides in the Museu de la Musica in Barcelona, and before the year 2000 it was restored to playable condition by the brothers Yagüe, Barcelona). The body of a classical guitar is a resonating chamber that projects the vibrations of the body through a sound hole, allowing the acoustic guitar to be heard without amplification. The sound hole is normally a single round hole in the top of the guitar (under the strings), though some have different placement, shapes, or numbers of holes. How much air an instrument can move determines its maximum volume.

==== Binding, purfling and kerfing ====
The top, back and sides of a classical guitar body are very thin, so a flexible piece of wood called kerfing (because it is often scored, or kerfed so it bends with the shape of the rim) is glued into the corners where the rim meets the top and back. This interior reinforcement provides 5 to 20 mm of solid gluing area for these corner joints.

During final construction, a small section of the outside corners is carved or routed out and filled with binding material on the outside corners and decorative strips of material next to the binding, which are called purfling. This binding serves to seal off the endgrain of the top and back. Binding and purfling materials are generally made of either wood or high-quality plastic materials.

==== Bridge ====
The main purpose of the bridge on a classical guitar is to transfer the vibration from the strings to the soundboard, which vibrates the air inside of the guitar, thereby amplifying the sound produced by the strings. The bridge holds the strings in place on the body. Also, the position of the saddle, usually a strip of bone or plastic that supports the strings off the bridge, determines the distance to the nut (at the top of the fingerboard). On early guitars, the bridge often curled upwards into a 'moustache'. The bridge may feature decorative inlay comparable to the rosette, often in traditional Granadan style.

=== Sizes ===
The modern full-size classical guitar has a scale length of around 650 mm (25.6 in), with an overall instrument length of 965–1,016 mm (38.0–40.0 in). The scale length has remained quite consistent since it was chosen by the originator of the instrument, Antonio de Torres. This length may have been chosen because it's twice the length of a violin string. As the guitar is tuned to one octave below that of the violin, the same size gut could be used for the first strings of both instruments.

Smaller-scale instruments are produced to assist children in learning the instrument as the smaller scale leads to the frets being closer together, making it easier for smaller hands. The scale-size for the smaller guitars is usually in the range 484–578 mm (19.1–22.8 in), with an instrument length of 785–915 mm (30.9–36.0 in). Full-size instruments are sometimes referred to as 4/4, while the smaller sizes are 3/4, 1/2, 1/4, and even as small as 1/8 for very small children. However, there is not a standardized set of dimensions for fractional guitars, and their size difference is not linear from a full size guitar.

== Tuning ==
A variety of different tunings are used. The most common by far, which one could call the "standard tuning" is:

- e^{I} – b – g – d – A – E

The above order is the tuning from the 1st string (highest-pitched string e'—spatially the bottom string in playing position) to the 6th string – lowest-pitched string E—spatially the upper string in playing position, and hence comfortable to pluck with the thumb.

The explanation for this "asymmetrical" tuning (in the sense that the maj 3rd is not between the two middle strings, as in the tuning of the viola da gamba) is probably that the guitar originated as a 4-string instrument (actually an instrument with 4 double courses of strings, see above) with a maj 3rd between the 2nd and 3rd strings, and it only became a 6-string instrument by gradual addition of a 5th string and then a 6th string tuned a 4th apart:

"The development of the modern tuning can be traced in stages. One of the tunings from the 16th century is C-F-A-D. This is equivalent to the top four strings of the modern guitar tuned a tone lower. However, the absolute pitch for these notes is not equivalent to modern "concert pitch". The tuning of the four-course guitar was moved up by a tone and toward the end of the 16th century, five-course instruments were in use with an added lower string tuned to A. This produced A-D-G-B-E, one of a wide number of variant tunings of the period. The low E string was added during the 18th century."

String	Sci. pitch	Helmholtz pitch	Interval from middle C	Semitones from A440	Freq., if using an Equal temperament tuning (using $\sqrt[12]{2} = 2^{(\frac{1}{12})}$)
1st (highest pitch)	E_{4}	e'	major third above	−5	$440 \rm{ Hz}\cdot (\sqrt[12]{2})^{-5} \approx$ 329.63 Hz
2nd	B_{3}	b	minor second below	−10	$440 \rm{ Hz}\cdot (\sqrt[12]{2})^{-10} \approx$ 246.94 Hz
3rd	G_{3}	g	perfect fourth below	−14	$440 \rm{ Hz}\cdot (\sqrt[12]{2})^{-14} \approx$ 196.00 Hz
4th	D_{3}	d	minor seventh below	−19	$440 \rm{ Hz}\cdot (\sqrt[12]{2})^{-19} \approx$ 146.83 Hz
5th	A_{2}	A	minor tenth below	−24	$440 \rm{ Hz}\cdot (\sqrt[12]{2})^{-24} =$ 110 Hz
6th (lowest pitch)	E_{2}	E	minor thirteenth below	−29	$440 \rm{ Hz}\cdot (\sqrt[12]{2})^{-29} \approx$ 82.41 Hz

This tuning is such that neighboring strings are at most 5 semitones apart. There are also a variety of commonly used alternate tunings. The most common is known as Drop D tuning which has the 6th string tuned down from an E to a D.

== Bibliography ==
- The Guitar and its Music (From the Renaissance to the Classical Era) (2007) by James Tyler, Paul Sparks. ISBN 0-19-921477-8
- Cambridge Studies in Performance Practice (No. 6): Performance on Lute, Guitar, and Vihuela (2005) edited by Victor Anand Coelho. ISBN 0-521-45528-6
- The Guitar: From the Renaissance to the Present Day by Harvey Turnbull; published by Bold Strummer, 1991. ISBN 0-933224-57-5
- The Guitar; by Sinier de Ridder; published by Edizioni Il Salabue; ISBN 88-87618-09-7
- La Chitarra, Quattro secoli di Capolavori (The Guitar: Four centuries of Masterpieces) by Giovanni Accornero, Ivan Epicoco, Eraldo Guerci; published by Edizioni Il Salabue
- Rosa sonora – Esposizione di chitarre XVII – XX secolo by Giovanni Accornero; published by Edizioni Il Salabue
- Lyre-guitar. Étoile charmante, between the 18th and 19th century by Eleonora Vulpiani
- Summerfield, Maurice, The Classical Guitar: Its Evolution, Players and Personalities since 1800 – 5th Edition, Blaydon : Ashley Mark Publishing Company, 2002.
- Various, Classical Guitar Magazine, Blaydon : Ashley Mark Publishing Company, monthly publication first published in 1982.
- Wade, Graham, Traditions of the Classical Guitar, London : Calder, 1980.
- Antoni Pizà: Francesc Guerau i el seu temps (Palma de Mallorca: Govern de les Illes Balears, Conselleria d'Educació i Cultura, Direcció General de Cultura, Institut d'Estudis Baleàrics, 2000) ISBN 84-89868-50-6

== See also ==
- Classical guitar strings
- Classical guitar pedagogy
- Early classical guitar recordings
- International classical guitar competitions
- Guitar Foundation of America
- Guitar
- Chordophones

=== Related instruments ===
- Brahms guitar
- Extended-range classical guitar
- Harp guitar
- Lyre-guitar
- Six-string alto guitar

=== Lists ===
- Bibliography of classical guitar
- List of classical guitarists
- List of composers for the classical guitar
- List of composers for the classical guitar (nationality)
