= Scheidegger =

Scheidegger is a surname. Notable people with the surname include:

- Casey Scheidegger (born 1988), Canadian curler
- Fritz Scheidegger (1930–1967), Swiss sidecar racer
- Mats Scheidegger (born 1963), Swiss musician and classical guitarist
