= Early classical guitar recordings =

Early recordings for the classical guitar had often have a low or limited audio quality since recording technology was just in its beginning phases, with the earliest known guitar sound recorded in either 1853 or 1854 recorded the phonautograph by Édouard-Léon Scott de Martinville. The phonautogram features a snippet of Adolphe Giacomelli playing a few notes on guitar, though it is unintelligible as a result of the recording’s brevity and low quality. A later guitar sound of a few notes was recorded was done by using the phonograph type invented by Thomas Edison on 18 July 1877, which used phonograph cylinders as a recording medium. Classical guitar recording quality greatly improved along with technological improvements to the phonograph and the development of the gramophone record in the 1900s.

== Early full-length recordings ==
The earliest known classical guitar recording is from cylinders (from the "Viuda de Aramburo" label), featuring guitarists Luis and Simon Ramirez, made in Madrid sometime between 1897 and 1901. Amongst the works they performed is a piece titled Estudio para Guitarra, which is today known as "Romance". Other known early recordings include: Mexican guitarist Octaviano Yañes performing his Mexican Dance on a record (Victor 05662) is dated 25 August 1908. Another version of this piece exists on Edison Foreign Series cylinder (catalogue number 20204). Brazilian guitarist Américo Jacomino Canhoto (1889–1928) recorded works in 1913, 1917, 1925, 1926, 1927, and 1928. Mario Maccaferri recorded eight works in 1929 (Granados: Danza no. 5 (rec. 1929), Bach: Courante (rec. 1929)}. The Paraguayan guitarist and composer Agustín Barrios (1885–1944) made recordings between 1913 and 1942 on the Atlanta/Artigas label, and later produced recordings for Odeon until 1929, including performances of his own works. Spanish guitarist and composer Miguel Llobet (1878–1938) made recordings between 1925 and 1929. Garoto (Aníbal Augusto Sardinha) made recordings in the 1950s. Luigi Mozzani (1869–1943) recorded three 78 rpm discs with much of his music. Andrés Segovia (1893–1987) made his earliest recordings in 1923 in Cuba, possibly for one of the major labels active in overseas territories as this time, such as Edison or Victor. The works recorded were Turina's Fandanguillo (Op. 36) and Tárrega's Recuerdos de la Alhambra. However, these early sessions have been lost. Segovia began recording for HMV (the Gramophone Company) in May 1927, remaining with the label until 1939. During this time he documented much of the repertoire that was to define the identity of the classical guitar during the first half of the 20th century, including a number of original works by composers Manuel M. Ponce, Mario Castelnuovo-Tedesco and Federico Moreno Torroba. Heitor Villa-Lobos (1887–1959) privately made recordings between mid-1920s and the early 1940s, including important performances of two of his guitar works. Italian guitarist Pasquale Taraffo (1887–1937) made recordings between 1926 and 1930 on a harp-guitar, Taraffo's Sonatina in A Major. Abel Fleury (1903–1958) recorded ten pieces between 1935 and 1954. There exists a recording of Italo Meschi from 1929.

Other early performers who have recorded include Emilio Pujol, Josefina Robledo, (Tárrega: Capricho Arabe), Luise Walker (1910–1998), Julio Martínez Oyanguren (1901-1973) from Uruguay (track - Jota), Guillermo Gómez (1880-1955), Maria Luisa Anido (1907–1996), Vicente Gomez (1911–2001), Francisco Salinas (1892–1993), Regino Sainz de la Maza (1896–1981) (Concierto de Aranjuez, rec. 1948 dedicated to Regino Sainz de la Maza), José Rey de la Torre (1917–1994), Nelly Ezcaray (born 1920), etc. Some of the recordings have been reissued on CD.

Julio Sagreras also made radio recordings, though it is not known if the tracks are still available, or if they have been released on CD.

There are probably still more early guitar recordings of high value and historic importance that can be discovered (e.g. there seems to be a lack of early recordings by Central and Eastern European guitarists, etc.), possibly in archives of record companies (or discontinued record companies), or in early radio recordings or private collections.

== See also ==
- Sound recording and reproduction
- History of sound recording
