= Guitarist =

Musician who plays the guitar

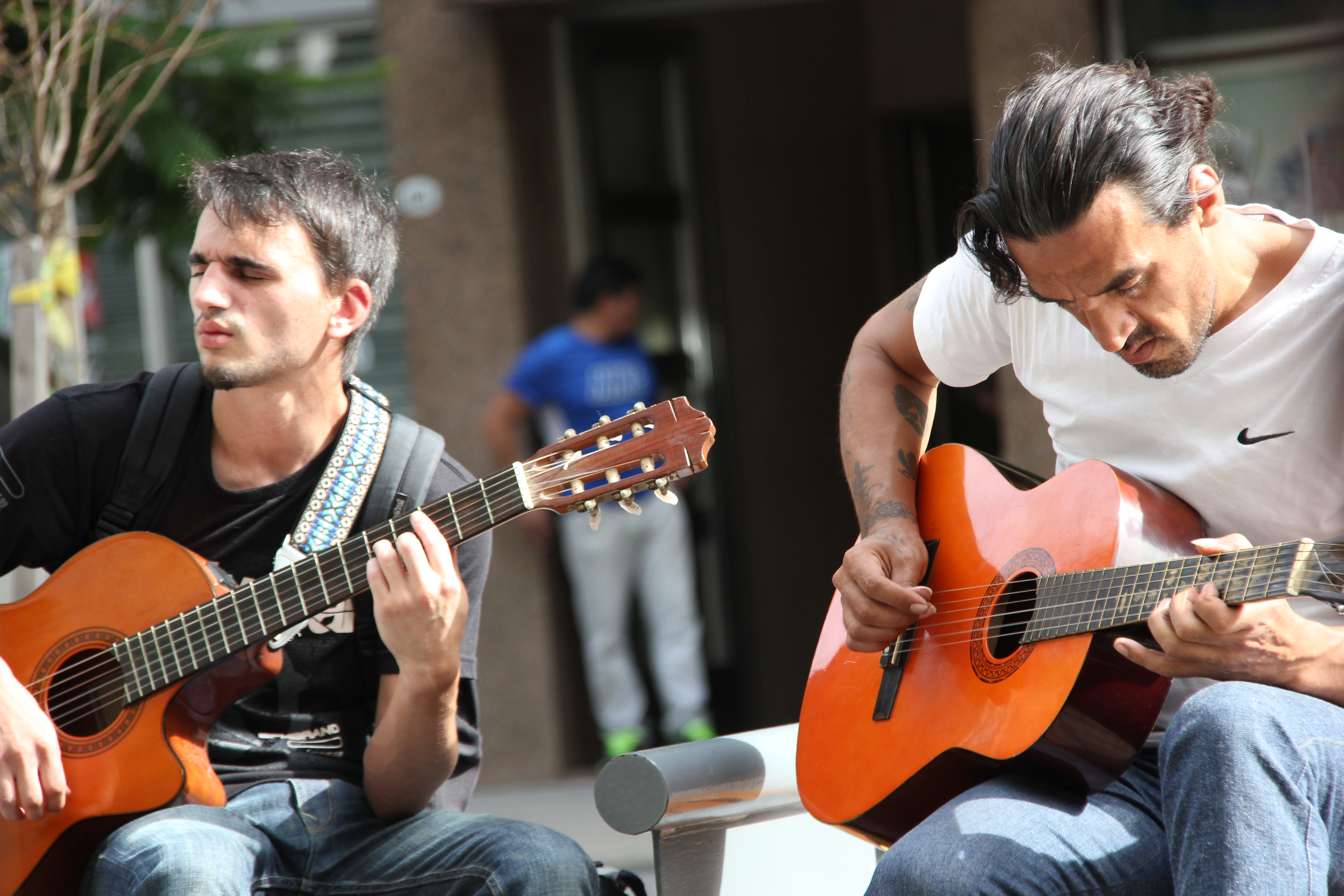
Guitar players in the city centre of Buenos Aires.

A guitarist (or a guitar player) is a person who plays the guitar. Guitarists may play a variety of guitar family instruments such as classical guitars, acoustic guitars, electric guitars, and bass guitars. Some guitarists accompany themselves on the guitar by singing or playing the harmonica, or both.

== Techniques ==
The guitarist may employ any of several methods for sounding the guitar, including finger-picking, depending on the type of strings used (either nylon or steel), and including strumming with the fingers, or a guitar pick made of bone, horn, plastic, metal, felt, leather, or paper, and melodic flatpicking and finger-picking.

The guitarist may also employ various methods for selecting notes and chords, including fingering, thumbing, the barre (a finger lying across many or all strings at a particular fret), and guitar slides, usually made of glass or metal. These left- and right-hand techniques may be intermixed in performance.

== Notable guitarists ==
=== Rock, metal, jazz, country and blues ===
Several magazines and websites have compiled what they intend as lists of the greatest guitarists—for example The 100 Greatest Guitarists of All Time by Rolling Stone magazine, or 100 Greatest Guitarists of All Time by Guitar World magazine.

==== Rolling Stone ====
The first in the list from 2007 is the American guitarist Jimi Hendrix, introduced by Pete Townshend, guitarist for the Who, who was, in his turn, ranked at #50 in the list.

In describing the list to readers, Paul MacInnes from British newspaper The Guardian wrote, "Surprisingly enough for an American magazine, the top 10 is fair jam-packed with Yanks", though he also noted three exceptions in the top 10. The online magazine Blogcritics criticized the list for introducing some allegedly undeserving guitarists while forgetting some artists the writer considered perhaps more worthy, such as Johnny Marr, Al Di Meola, Phil Keaggy or John Petrucci.

In 2011, Rolling Stone updated the list, which this time was chosen by a panel of guitarists and other experts. Jimi Hendrix was again named as the greatest. Artists who had not been included in the previous list were added. Rory Gallagher, for example, was ranked in 57th place.

The 100 Greatest Guitarists of All Time is mentioned in many biographies about artists who appear in the list.

==== Guitar World ====
Guitar World, a monthly music magazine devoted to the guitar, also published their list of 100 greatest guitarists in the book Guitar World Presents the 100 Greatest Guitarists of All Time from the Pages of Guitar World Magazine. Different from the Rolling Stone list, which listed guitarists in descending order, Guitar World divided guitarists by music genre—such as "Lords of Hard Rock" for hard rock artists or "Jazzmen" for jazz players. Despite the appearance in other magazines like Billboard, this publication by Guitar World was criticized for including no female musicians within its selection. However, Guitar World recently published a list of "Eight Amazing Female Acoustic Players", including Kaki King, Muriel Anderson and Sharon Isbin.

==== Time and others ====
Following the death of Les Paul, Time website presented their list of 10 greatest artists in electric guitar. As in Rolling Stone magazine's list, Jimi Hendrix was chosen as the greatest guitarist followed by Slash from Guns N' Roses, Tony Iommi, Keith Richards, Jimmy Page, and Eric Clapton. Gigwise.com, an online music magazine, also ranks Jimi Hendrix as the greatest guitarist ever, followed by Jimmy Page, B.B. King, Keith Richards and Kirk Hammett.

==== World War II era ====
During the World War II era, several American guitarists also made significant early contributions to the evolution of Jazz in both the United States and Germany. Mike Danzi is credited with contributing to the introduction of American popular musical genres to Germany during the Weimar Republic in the 1920s until the rise of the Nazi regime in the late 1930s. During the post World War II, era both Al Caiola and Tony Mottola also made significant contributions as recording artists, studio musicians and accompanists on major American radio and television networks.

=== Other genres ===
The classical guitar is traditionally strung with gut or nylon strings for the treble notes, and wound strings for the bass. Often adorned with mother-of-pearl inlays, the instrument was once primarily played using the fingertips alone. Over time, however, guitarists began to use a combination of fingernail and flesh to achieve a clearer, more expressive sound, and allowing for many different changes in sound quality (or timbre). This guitar tradition dates back at least to the seventeenth and eighteenth centuries, when a four course instrument was popular among aristocrats. In the early nineteenth century there the guitar enjoyed a surge of popularity when composer/performers such as Fernando Sor, Napoléon Coste, Mauro Giuliani, and many others published thousands of pieces for the concert hall and home gatherings. The classical guitar enjoyed another period of popularity in the twentieth century when recordings amplified the relatively quiet instrument. There are many classical guitarists listed as "notable" in their respective epochs.

During the post World War II era the Spanish virtuoso guitarist Andrés Segovia played a central role in gaining respect for the guitar as a "serious" concert instrument among audiences within the realm of classical music. Segovia's performances on the international concert hall stage ranged over three decades and included his own transcriptions of works from both the classical and baroque eras. In the late 20th century a new generation of classical guitarists followed Segovia's lead by encouraging even wider international admiration for the guitar. Included in this group are: Julian Bream, Oscar Ghiglia, Christopher Parkening, Celedonio Romero, Pepe Romero, Angel Romero and John Williams.

One of the most renowned flamenco guitarists in recent decades was Paco de Lucía. Flamenco music is a popular traditional music associated with the Andalucia region of southern Spain. It is characterized by intricate syncopated rhythms intimately informed by a gypsy dance style. Flamenco guitarists also often accompany flamenco singers performing "cante jondo" (deep song). De Lucía was also one of the first to have successfully crossed over into other genres of music such as classical and jazz.

The cuatro guitar is a family of Latin American string instruments played in Puerto Rico, Venezuela and other Latin American countries. It is derived from the Spanish guitar. Although some have viola-like shapes, most cuatros resemble a small to mid-sized classical guitar. In Puerto Rico and Venezuela, the cuatro is an ensemble instrument for secular and religious music, and is played at parties and traditional gatherings. Christian Nieves is a Puerto Rican cuatro player and is recognized by the Institute of Puerto Rican culture as the most talented young of their national instrument, the Puerto Rican cuatro.
