= Albert Augustine =

Albert Augustine may refer to:

- Albert Augustine (inventor) (1900–1967), luthier and inventor
  - Albert Augustine Ltd., originator of and manufacturer of nylon classical guitar strings
- Albert Earl Augustine (1890–1975), American politician from Iowa

== See also ==
- Augustine Albert (1791–1867), French opera singer
