= American classical guitar music =

- Stylistic origins: European classical music; American folk music
- Cultural origins: 19th-century United States
- Typical instruments: Classical guitar

Subgenres
- Contemporary classical guitar; Fingerstyle; New Age classical guitar

Other topics
- Classical guitar technique

American classical guitar music refers to the evolution of the classical guitar tradition in the United States, where techniques from European classical music merged with American cultural influences to create a unique approach in performance, composition and pedagogy. Over the past two centuries, American guitarists have adapted, expanded and redefined classical guitar music—transforming the instrument from a domestic salon favorite into a concert and academic staple.

== History ==
In the 19th century, the classical guitar entered American middle-class culture as an accessible alternative to the piano. Early method books and arrangements by pioneering musicians helped disseminate European techniques while incorporating local popular melodies and elements of American folk music. Throughout the 19th and early 20th centuries, the instrument evolved from a domestic salon favorite to a concert instrument, aided by community clubs and later formal academic programs. This evolution was driven not only by technical innovation but also by changing social dynamics such as European immigration and the growth of educational institutions.

== Pioneers and notable musicians ==
American classical guitar music has been shaped by influential figures across different eras:

=== Early pioneers ===
- Justin Holland (1819–1887) – One of the first African American guitarists to gain national recognition, Holland published pioneering method books and composed innovative arrangements that bridged European classical music with emerging American idioms.
- William Foden (1860–1947) – A virtuoso from St. Louis, Missouri. Foden became one of America's premier classical guitarists in the 1890s. His compositions—ranging from popular dance forms to virtuosic showpieces—and his method books significantly influenced performance and education in the United States.

=== Mid‑20th century innovators ===
- Luis T. Romero (1854–1893) – A celebrated Californio guitarist whose expressive playing and innovative arrangements contributed to the early foundation of American classical guitar performance. His work is often discussed in the context of Romantic music and early guitar evolution.
- Aaron Shearer (1922–2008) – Known as the "father of American classical guitar education", Shearer revolutionized pedagogy with his influential method books and by establishing guitar programs at institutions such as American University and the Peabody Institute.
- Christopher Parkening (born 1947) – A protégé of Andrés Segovia, Parkening's international career as a performer and his subsequent role as an educator (currently at Pepperdine University) have significantly elevated the classical guitar's status.

=== Contemporary leaders ===
- David Leisner (born 1953) – An innovative performer and composer known for rediscovering overlooked repertoire and for his original works, Leisner's book Playing With Ease (2018) documents his ergonomic approach to overcoming focal dystonia.
- Benjamin Verdery (born 1955) – Recognized for his eclectic programming and recordings spanning works from Bach to transcriptions of Jimi Hendrix, Verdery has built a reputation as one of the guitar's grand individualists while teaching at the Yale School of Music.
- Jason Vieaux (born 1973) – The youngest First Prize winner in the Guitar Foundation of America International Competition, Vieaux is acclaimed for his technical precision and soulful interpretations, with his Grammy Award–winning album Play (2014) showcasing his contributions to modern classical guitar performance.
- Michael Chapdelaine (1956–2023) – Celebrated for his success in both classical and fingerstyle genres, Chapdelaine's diverse repertoire and emotive playing enriched the American classical guitar tradition.
- Additional influential musicians include David Starobin, Sharon Isbin, Andrew York (guitarist), and Lily Afshar, among others.

== Pedagogical contributions and institutions ==
The growth of American classical guitar music is inseparable from its educational infrastructure. Organizations such as the Guitar Foundation of America have spurred the formation of competitions and master classes that promote excellence in performance and teaching. Major academic institutions—including the Yale School of Music, Manhattan School of Music, Pepperdine University, and the Curtis Institute of Music—have established dedicated guitar departments, often under the guidance of pioneers like Aaron Shearer.

== Repertoire and performance ==
American classical guitarists have significantly enriched the instrument's repertoire. Early arrangements of European works gradually gave way to original compositions reflecting diverse influences—from American folk music and blues to jazz and contemporary minimalism. Landmark recordings and live recitals have demonstrated the classical guitar's capacity for both virtuosic display and profound expressivity, as noted in reviews by publications such as The New York Times and Acoustic Guitar Magazine.

== Impact and legacy ==
The legacy of American classical guitar music is evident in its enduring influence on performance, recording, and education. Early pioneers adapted European models to suit American tastes, while later generations introduced innovative techniques and original works that continue to inspire musicians worldwide. Advances in recording technology and the proliferation of digital media have further amplified this legacy, making historically significant performances and modern interpretations accessible globally.

== Future trends ==
Contemporary classical guitarists are integrating digital technology, interdisciplinary collaborations, and global musical influences to push the genre's boundaries. Emerging trends include:

- The use of online master classes and digital platforms for global instruction (see also Online education).
- Cross-genre collaborations that blend classical guitar with jazz, folk, and world music.
- A renewed focus on commissioning new works and reviving neglected repertoire.

These trends suggest that American classical guitar music will continue to evolve while honoring its rich historical roots.

== See also ==
- Classical guitar technique
- European classical music – Background on the tradition that influenced early American guitar music.
- American folk music
- Category:Guitar competitions – Category page for guitar competitions.
- Category:American classical guitarists – Category page for American classical guitarists.
