= Bibliography of classical guitar =

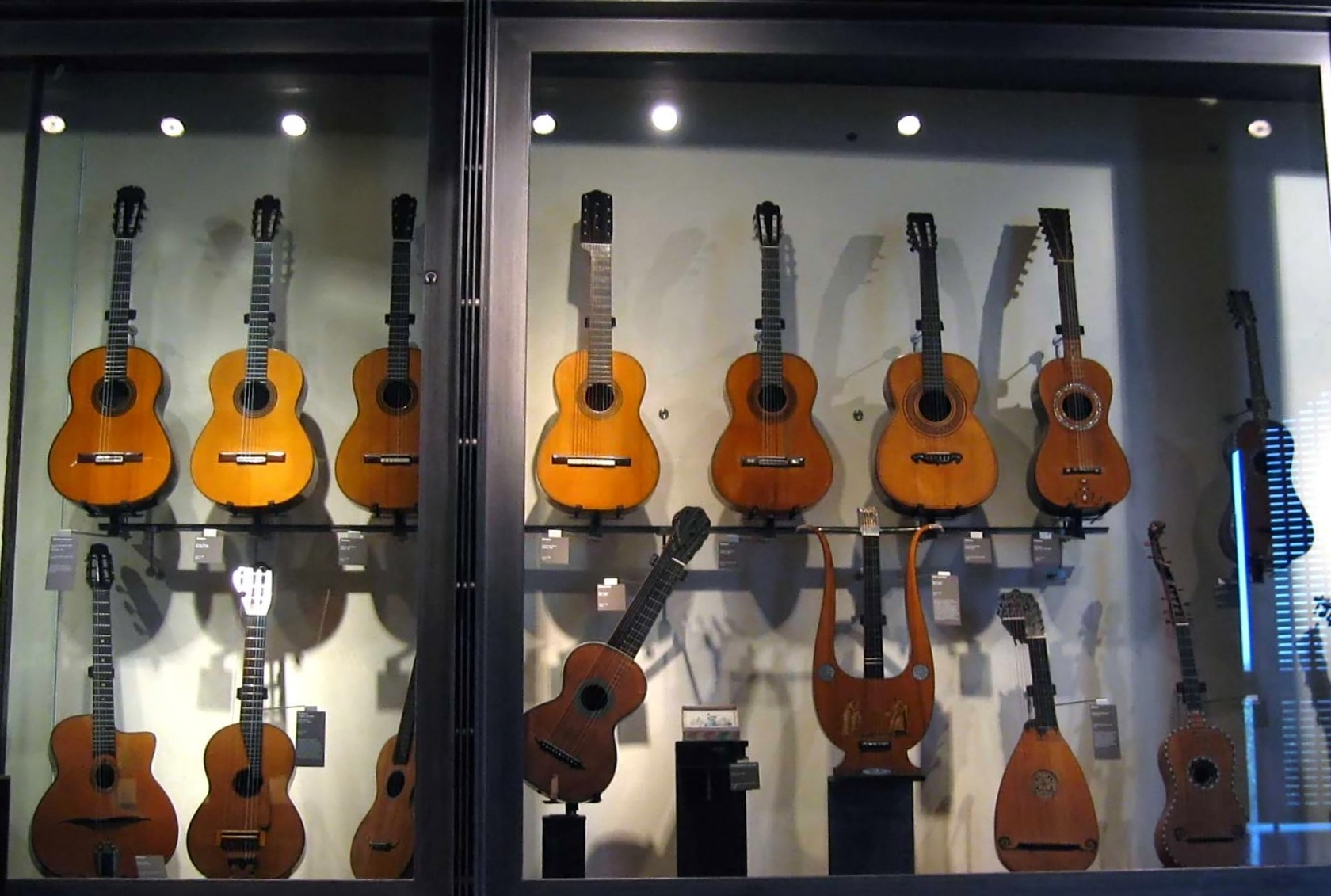
Classical guitars

The following is a bibliography of classical guitar related publications.

The classical guitar (also called the "Spanish guitar" or "nylon string guitar") is a six-stringed plucked string instrument from the family of instruments called chordophones. The classical guitar is well known for its comprehensive right-hand technique, which allows the soloist to perform complex melodic and polyphonic material, in much the same manner as the piano.

== A ==
- Annala, Hannu & Mätlik, Heiki: Handbook of Guitar and Lute Composers (Pacific, Missouri: Mel Bay, 2007)
- Ansorge, Peter & Richter, Helmut (eds.): Die klassische Gitarre im 20. Jahrhundert. Beiträge zu ihrer Entwicklung im deutschsprachigen Raum (Oberhausen: European Guitar Teachers Association Deutschland e.V., 2010)
- Appleby, Wilfrid M.: The Evolution of the Classic Guitar: a Tentative Outline (Cheltenham, Glos.: International Classic Guitar Association, 1966)
- Azpiazu Iriarte, José de: The Guitar and Guitarists, from the Beginning to the Present Day (London: G. Ricordi, 1960)

== B ==
- Bacon, Tony: The History of the American Guitar. From 1833 to the Present Day (New York: Friedman/Fairfax Publishers, 2001)
- Bellow, Alexander: The Illustrated History of the Guitar (New York: Franco Colombo, 1970; 2nd edition, Long Island, NY: Belwin/Mills Publishing Corp., 1976)
- Bobri, Vladimir: The Segovia Technique (London: Macmillan, 1972; paperback edition, New York: Collier Books, 1977; 2nd edition, Westport, Conn.: The Bold Strummer Ltd., 1990)
- Bone, Philip J.: The Guitar and Mandolin. Biographies of Celebrated Players and Composers (London: Schott & Co., 1914; revised edition, [same publisher] 1954; reprint with new foreword by Irene Bone, [same publisher] 1970)
- Brondi, Maria Rita: Il liuto e la chitarra. Ricerche storiche sulla loro origine e sul loro sviluppo (Torino: Fratelli Bocca, 1926)
- Buek, Fritz: Die Gitarre und ihre Meister (Berlin: Robert Lienau, 1926)

== C ==
- Carfagna, Carlo: Chitarra. Storia e immagini (Rome: Fratelli Palombi, c.2000)
- Charnassé, Hélène: Les instruments à cordes pincées: harpe, luth et guitare (Paris: Presses Universitaires de France, 1970)
- Coelho, Victor Anand (ed.): The Cambridge Companion to the Guitar (Cambridge: Cambridge University Press, 2003)
- Cooper, Colin: Guitar Interviews. Vol. 1: Best from Classical Guitar Magazine (Pacific, Missouri: Mel Bay, 2001)

== F ==
- Fokken Alcazar, Miguel (ed.) & Segal, Peter (transl.): The Segovia-Ponce Letters (Columbus, Ohio: Editions Orphée, 1990)
- Freeth, Nick & Alexander, Charles: The Guitar (Philadelphia: Running Press, c.2002)

== G ==
- Grunfeld, Frederic V.: The Art and Times of the Guitar. An Illustrated History of Guitars and Guitarists (London: Macmillan, c.1969)

== H ==
- Hacker-Klier, Ingrid & Klier, Johannes: Die Gitarre. Ein Instrument und seine Geschichte (Bad Schussenried: Bruckbauer [Biblioteca de la Guitarra], 1980)
- Hackl, Stefan: Die Gitarre in Österreich. Von Abate Costa bis Zykan (Innsbruck: Studienverlag, 2011)
- Herrera, Francisco (ed.): Enciclopedia de la guitarra. Biografías, Danzas, Historía, Organología, Técnica, 6 volumes or CD-ROM (Valencia: Piles, 2001; 3rd edition, 2006)
- Hindrichs, Thorsten: Zwischen 'leerer Klimperey' und 'wirklicher Kunst'. Gitarrenmusik in Deutschland um 1800 (Münster: Waxmann, 2012)
- Hoek, Jan-Anton van: Die Gitarrenmusik im 19. Jahrhundert: Geschichte, Technik, Interpretation (Wilhelmshaven: Heinrichshofen, 1983)
- Huber, Karl: Die Wiederbelebung des künstlerischen Gitarrespiels um 1900. Untersuchungen zur Sozialgeschichte des Laienmusikwesens und zur Tradition der klassischen Gitarre (Augsburg: Lisardo, 1995)

== I ==
- Sharon Isbin: Classical Guitar Answer Book (Milwaukee, Wisconsin: Hal Leonard, 1999)

== J ==
- Janssens, Robert: Geschiedenis van de luit en de gitaar (Antwerpen: Metropolis, c.1980)
- Jape, Mijndert: Classical Guitar Music in Print (Philadelphia: Musicdata Inc., 1989)

== K ==
- Kuronen, Darcy / Kaye Lenny / Tremblay, Carl: Dangerous Curves. The Art of the Guitar (Boston: MFA Publications, c.2000)

== M ==
- Maslen, J.: Guitars and Guitar Playing. A List of Selected References and Music (Melbourne: State Library of Victoria, 1966)
- McCutcheon, Meredith: Guitar and Vihuela. An Annotated Bibliography (New York: Pendragon Press, c.1985)
- Monno, Johannes: Die Barockgitarre. Darstellung ihrer Entwicklung und Spielweise (Munich: Tree Edition, c.1995)

== N ==
- Nickel, Heinz: Beitrag zur Entwicklung der Giterre in Europa (Haimhausen: Biblioteca de la Guitarra, 1972)
- Noonan, Jeffrey J.: The Guitar in America: Victorian Era to Jazz (Jackson, Mississippi: University Press of Mississippi, 2008)
- Noonan, Jeffrey J.: The Guitar in American Banjo, Mandolin and Guitar Periodicals, 1882-1933 (Madison: A-R Editions, 2009)

== P ==
- Päffgen, Peter: Die Gitarre. Grundzüge ihrer Entwicklung (Mainz: Schott, 1988; revised edition, 2002)
- Powroźniak, Józef: Gitara od A do Z (Kraków: Polskie Wydawnictwo Muzyczne, c.1978; German edition as Gitarren-Lexikon (Berlin: Verlag Neue Musik, 1979; 3rd edition, 1986)
- Prat, Domingo: Diccionario de Guitarristas (Buenos Aires: Romero & Fernandez, 1934; reprint: Columbus, Ohio: Éditions Orphée, 1986)
- Emilio Pujol: El dilemma del sonido en la guitarra (Buenos Aires: Ricordi Americana, [date?])

== R ==
- Ragossnig, Konrad: Handbuch der Gitarre und Laute (Mainz: Schott, 1987; revised edition, 2004)
- Radole, Giuseppe: Liuto, chitarra e vihuela (Milano: Suvini Zerboni, 1979)
- Regazzi, Roberto: The Complete Luthiers Library (Bologna: Florenus Edizioni, 1990)
- Restle, Conny & Li, Christopher (eds.): Faszination Gitarre (Berlin: Nicolaische Verlagsbuchhandlung, 2010)
- Rodriquez, Manuel: Art and Craft of Making Classical Guitars (Milwaukee, Wisconsin: Hal Leonard, 2004)

== S ==
- Schmitz, Peter: Gitarrenmusik für Dilettanten. Entwicklung und Stellenwert des Gitarrenspiels in der bürgerlichen Musikpraxis der ersten Hälfte des 19. Jahrhunderts im deutschsprachigen Raum (Frankfurt etc.: Peter Lang, 1998)
- Schneider, John: The Contemporary Guitar (Oakland, California: University of California Press, 1985; revised edition: Lanham, Maryland: Rowman & Littlefield, 2015)
- Schwarz, Werner: Guitar Bibliography. An International Listing of Theoretical Literature on Classical Guitar from the Beginning to the Present / Gitarre-Bibliographie. Internationales Verzeichnis der theoretischen Literatur zur klassischen Gitarre von den Anfängen bis zur Gegenwart (Munich: K.G. Saur, 1984)
- Sharpe, A.P.: The Story of the Spanish Guitar (London, Clifford Essex Music Co., 1954; 4th edition, 1968)
- Summerfield, Maurice J.: The Classical Guitar. Its Evolution, Players and Personalities since 1800 (Blaydon-on-Tyne: Ashley Mark, 1982; 5th edition, 2002)
- Scott Tennant: Pumping Nylon (New York: Alfred Publishing Co., 1995)

== T ==
- Tosone, Jim: Classical Guitarists: Conversations (Jefferson, North Carolina: McFarland & Co., 2000)
- Turnbull, Harvey: The Guitar (from the Renaissance to the Present Day) (London: B.T. Batsford Ltd. and New York: C. Scribner's Sons, 1974)
- Tyler, James: The Guitar and its Music. From the Renaissance to the Classical Era (Oxford: Oxford University Press, 2002)

== V ==
- Viglietti, Cédar: Origen e historia de la guitarra (Buenos Aires: Editorial Albatros, 1973)
- Villar Rodriguez, José: La guitara española. Caracteristicas y construcción (Barcelona: Clivis Publicaciones, 1985)

== W ==
- Wade, Graham: A Concise History of the Classic Guitar (Pacific, Missouri: Mel Bay, 2001)
- Wade, Graham: Traditions of the Classical Guitar (London: Calder, 1980)
- Wolff, Eduard & Zelton, Heinrich: Gitarren-Lexikon (Wilhelmshafen: Florian Noetzel Verlag, 1996)

== Z ==
- Zuth, Josef: Handbuch der Laute und Gitarre (Vienna: Anton Goll, 1928; reprint, Hildesheim: Georg Olms, 1972; 3rd reprint, 2003)
