= Classical guitar strings =

Part of a musical instrument

Classical guitar strings are strings manufactured for use on classical guitars. While steel-string acoustic guitar strings and electric guitar strings are made of metal, modern classical guitar strings are made of nylon and nylon wound with wire, which produces a different sound to the metal strings. Classical guitar strings were originally made with animal intestine and silk wound with animal intestine up until World War II, when war restrictions led Albert Augustine Ltd. to develop nylon strings. Nylon guitar strings were put into production in 1948. Strings made from fluorocarbon polymers have since been developed and are the main alternative to nylon strings.

== String construction ==
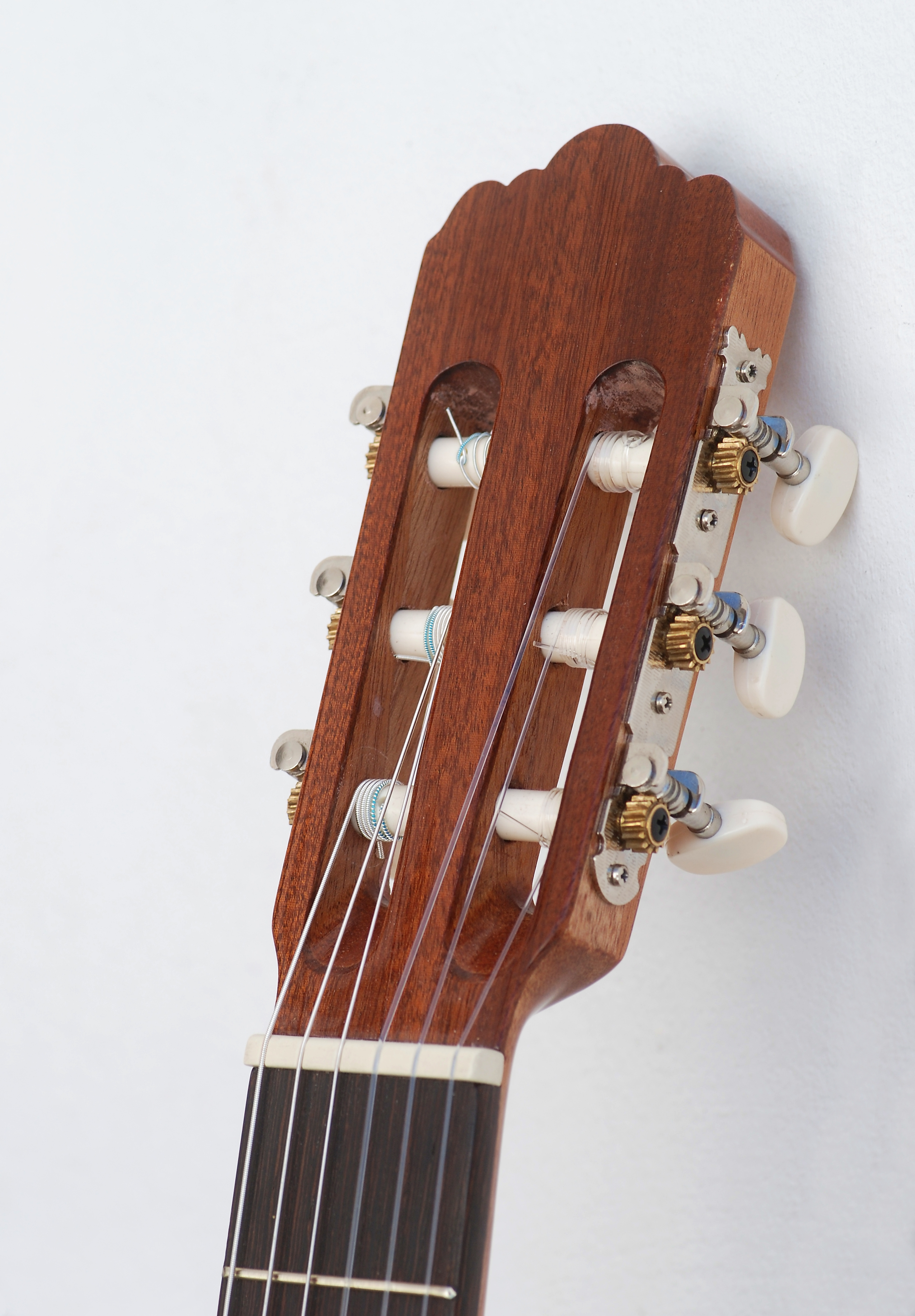
Partial view of nylon strings on a classical guitar with tuning pegs

=== Traditional ===
The three treble guitar strings (the three highest-pitched strings) are made from sheep or cow intestine, referred to as plain gut, while the three bass strings are made of a silk thread core wound with gut.

=== Modern ===
Since the development of nylon guitar strings by Albert Augustine Ltd. in 1948, the three treble strings are a single nylon filament, while the three bass strings are made of a core of fine nylon threadlike filaments wound with silver-plated bronze or copper wire.

== History ==
Up until the Second World War animal gut and silk were the materials from which guitar strings were manufactured. Albert Augustine, an instrument maker from New York, USA, was the first to produce guitar strings with nylon. According to Rose Augustine, his wife, he was unable to secure source materials due to the war restrictions and happened upon nylon line in an army surplus store in Greenwich Village. When initially approached by him the DuPont company, who manufactured the material, were unconvinced that guitarists would accept nylon's sonic characteristics. Augustine staged a blind test with company representatives from DuPont, they happened to choose nylon over gut as having the best "guitar sound". The DuPont company then supported Augustine's initiative. Augustine classical guitar strings were first commercially manufactured in 1948, in conjunction with Olinto Mari, President of E.& O. Mari/La Bella Strings at their factory in Long Island City New York. When Andrés Segovia, the great Spanish guitar virtuoso, discovered Augustine's strings he was an immediate convert.

Fluorocarbon polymers have recently become an alternative to nylon treble strings. The sound is preferred by some luthiers and players, especially for the smooth transition provided by the G string from treble to bass.
