= Albert Augustine Ltd. =

Albert Augustine Ltd. is the originator of and currently a manufacturer of nylon classical guitar strings. In addition, the company supports the classical guitar and guitarists by presenting several annual New York guitar series at the Manhattan School of Music, the Queen Sofia Spanish Institute and other important venues, by commissioning hundreds of original solo and chamber music works and concertos from some of the foremost contemporary composers, by donating thousands of dollars for scholarships, special artist's projects and guitar festivals, and by publishing Guitar Review magazine.

== Albert Augustine ==
In 1926–1927, Albert Augustine (born Denmark 1900, died New York City, April 1967) moved to the United States to pursue his career as a luthier. In 1928, he married his wife, Rose.

During this period, he experimented with different types of strings without significant result. It was to be almost 20 years before his collaboration with famed guitarist Andrés Segovia would result in the development of the nylon guitar string.

== Development of the nylon guitar string ==
In the mid-1940s, Andrés Segovia mentioned the shortage of good guitar strings in the United States, particularly his favorite Pirastro catgut strings, to a number of foreign diplomats at a party, including General Lindeman of the British Embassy. A month later, the General presented Segovia with some nylon strings which he had obtained via some members of the DuPont family. Segovia found that although the strings produced a clear sound, they had a faint metallic timbre which he hoped could be eliminated.

Nylon strings were first tried on stage by Olga Coelho in New York in January 1944.

In 1946, Segovia and Augustine were introduced by their mutual friend Vladimir Bobri, editor of Guitar Review. On the basis of Segovia's interest and Augustine's past experiments, they decided to pursue the development of nylon strings. DuPont, skeptical of the idea, agreed to supply the nylon if Augustine would endeavor to develop and produce the actual strings. After three years of development, Augustine demonstrated a nylon first string whose quality impressed guitarists, including Segovia, in addition to DuPont.

Wound strings, however, were more problematic. Eventually, however, after experimenting with various types of metal and smoothing and polishing techniques, Augustine was also able to produce high quality nylon wound strings.

== Subsequent history ==
Augustine suffered a heart attack in 1948, but survived. Segovia became a great supporter of Augustine's work. He commissioned a guitar from Augustine in 1956 which was never finished. Augustine died of his second heart attack in 1967. Under Rose Augustine, then Steven Griesgraber following her death in 2003, the company continues to produce nylon strings and support the field of classical guitar.
