= Hermann Hauser Sr. =

German luthier (1882-1952)

Hermann Hauser Sr. (28 December 1882 in Erding – 28 October 1952 in Reisbach) was a German luthier. He worked in Munich and later in the Bavarian Reisbach. Guitar models by Hermann Hauser Sr. included the Vienna Model and the Munich Model, the Terz-Guitar, the Prim-Guitar and the Fifth-Bass Guitar (Quintbass). But it was his innovations based on the designs of Antonio de Torres for which he "is generally considered to have been the greatest guitar maker outside Spain." His Torres-based instruments are historically important, having profoundly influenced classical guitar builders and performing artists of the modern era. Andres Segovia described the 1937 Hauser Sr. with which he performed and recorded from 1938 to 1962 as the "greatest guitar of our epoch," and it is one of two Hauser Sr. guitars in the Metropolitan Museum of Art, New York collection. Met curator of musical instruments Jayson Dobney described Segovia's 1937 Hauser as having "changed music history": "This guitar, as much as Andre Segovia, established classical guitar playing." The British guitarist and lute player Julian Bream described Hausers as "the very essence of classicism in guitar sound" and recorded at least eight of his albums using Hauser Sr. Torres models of various vintages. Renowned antiquarian dealers Christie's and Brompton's Fine & Rare Instruments regularly offer Hauser Sr. guitars at auction. Hauser's Torres model is "one of the most copied guitars of today," with master luthiers such as Simon Ambridge (England), German Vazquez Rubio and Brian Cohen (UK), Paolo Coriani (Italy) and Francisco Navarro Garcia (Mexico) among many others, as well as popular manufacturers such as Cordoba, all offering Hauser-inspired models.

== History ==
Hauser Sr. was himself the son of a luthier, Josef Hauser (1854-1939), and attended the State School for Violin Making in Mittenwald as a youth. Becoming a luthier involved passing a state exam that covered all aspects of the luthier's art, and Hauser's examination master was Johann Otto Haslvanter, a famous guitar and zither maker in Munich. As was common at the time, Hermann Sr. built not only guitars, but also violins, zithers, lutes and viols. Apparently, his earliest guitars were similar to the small French- or Italian-made instruments popular in the 1800s, although he was by 1905 making Viennese models based on the designs of Johann Georg Stauffer.

Things changed in 1913, when the Spanish guitar virtuoso Miguel Llobet was invited by the Guitar Association of Munich to perform in concert. Hauser Sr., who played the smaller terz guitar in the then-famous Munich Guitar Quartet, met Llobet there, and the two men soon became friends. The Spanish guitarist realized that Hauser was not only a guitar player but an outstanding guitar builder, as well. The two held deep discussions on instrument construction. At that time, Spanish guitar construction had not been widely publicized, but, providentially, Llobet had brought his Antonio de Torres–made guitar with him to Munich. Hauser was able to closely study the construction techniques used by Torres and incorporate many of them into his own efforts. He built several Spanish-style guitars for his friend Llobet.

A little over a decade later, the process was repeated, but this time it was Andrés Segovia whom the Munich Guitar Union invited to play. Llobet was there as well. By this time, the basic design and construction concept of the Hauser guitar had been completed, based on the Torres system. Segovia had heard and seen Llobet's Hauser-built guitars and was interested in obtaining one for himself. He had brought his Santos Hernandez–built Ramírez guitar with him to Munich, so he was able to show the luthier the aspects he required.

Herman Hauser Sr. worked patiently with Segovia for several years, making various modifications to the instruments. Finally, in 1937, the builder delivered the instrument that Segovia declared “the greatest guitar of our epoch,” and which now sits in New York's Metropolitan Museum of Art.

Between 1924 and his death in 1952, Hauser built some 250 Torres-style guitars, often designing them to fit specific qualities desired by the customer, as he had done with Segovia.

== Legacy ==
Hauser's son, Hermann Hauser II (1911–1988), grandson, Hermann Hauser III (born in 1958) and great-granddaughter, Kathrin Hauser (born 1982), have continued the master luthier's tradition.

Together with the Munich entrepreneur, producer, and guitarist Klaus Wolfgang Wildner, Hermann Hauser III established the non-profit Hermann Hauser Guitar Foundation in 2004 to "support and promote science and culture in the scope of guitar music and lute music," dedicated to Hermann Hauser Sr.
