= Julio Martínez Oyanguren =

Uruguayan composer and guitarist (1901–1973)

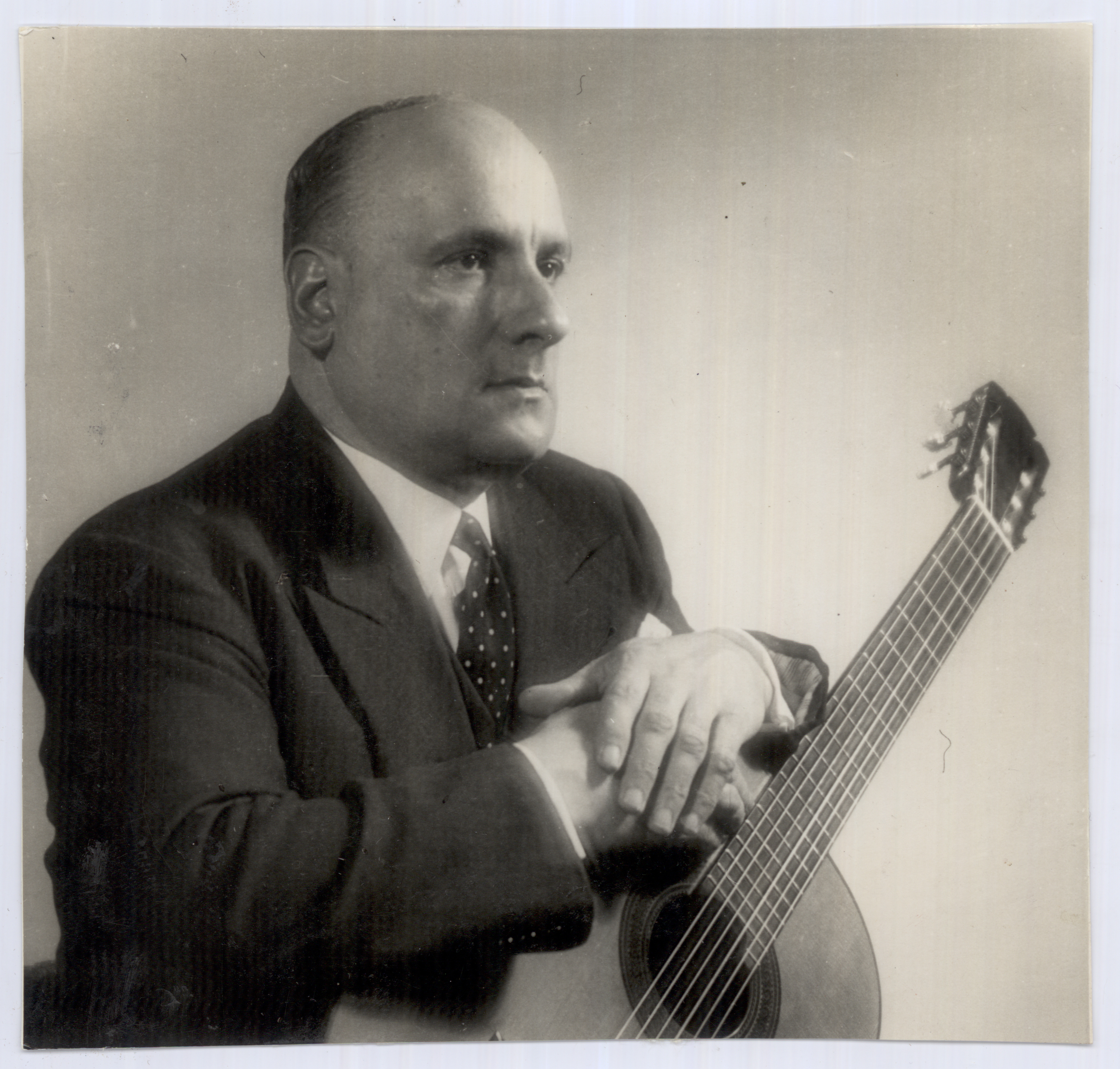
- Julio Martínez Oyanguren
- Born: July 3, 1901; Durazno, Uruguay
- Died: September 13, 1973 (aged 72)
- Occupations: Composer, guitarist, mechanical engineer

Julio Martínez Oyanguren (Durazno, Uruguay 3 July 1901 – Montevideo, Uruguay 13 September 1973) was an Uruguayan composer, guitarist and mechanical engineer.

== Life ==
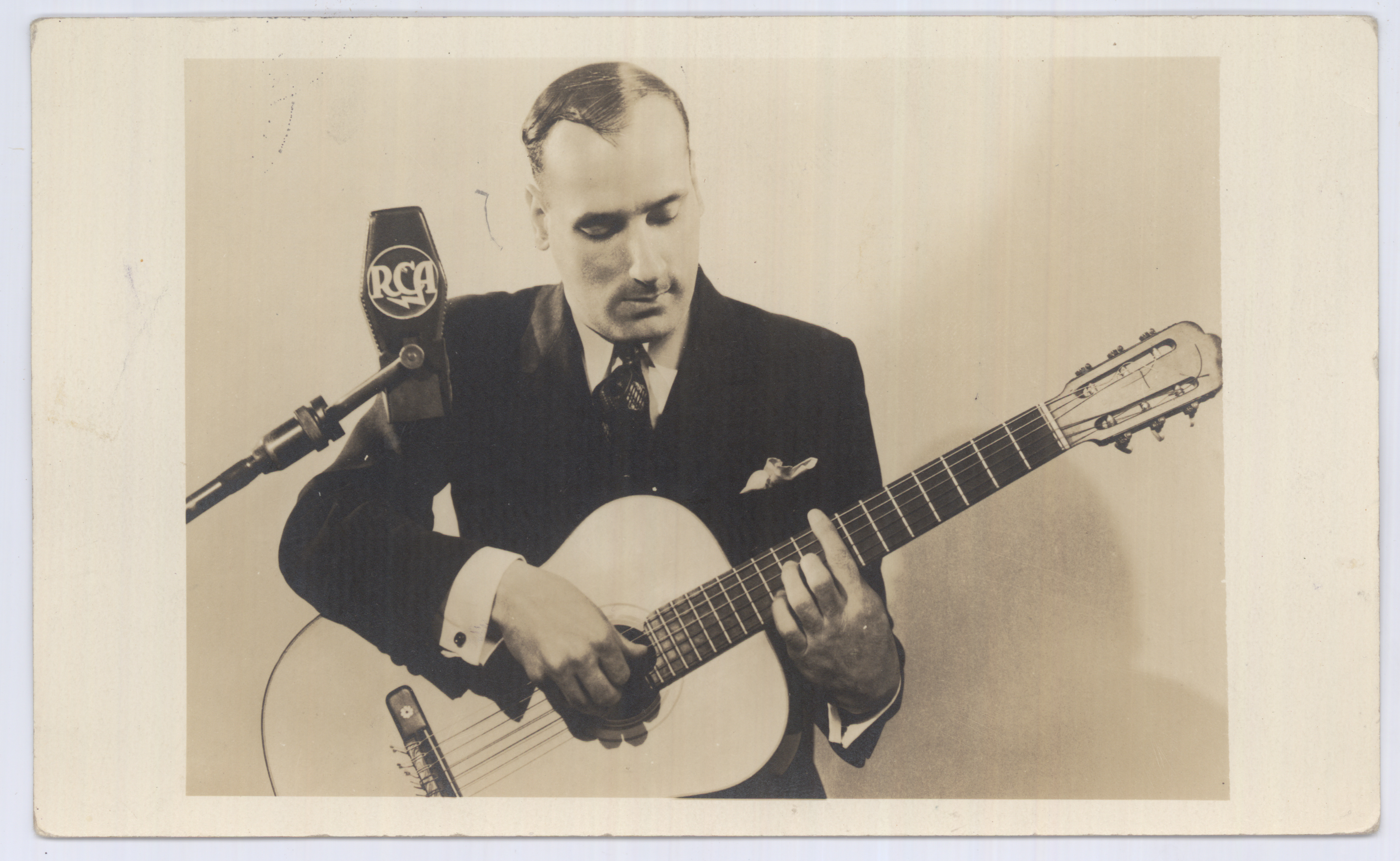
Julio Martínez Oyanguren in front of a RCA microphone.

Martínez Oyanguren began his musical studies in his hometown with the piano teacher Alfredo Hargain. In 1919, he moved to Montevideo where he met Leoncio Marichal, a guitar teacher. Oyanguren's musical talent surprised Marichal, who sought to have his pupil perform a public concert.

That same year, while still a naval cadet, he and other classmates were assigned to travel to Mexico to accompany the remains of the poet and prose writer Amado Nervo, who had been serving as that country's Ambassador to Uruguay.

Around this time, Oyanguren began to practice assiduously while also increasing his reading and his attendance at concerts. This work involved enormous effort for him, as he simultaneously continued his professional studies, from which he finally graduated in 1924, obtaining the title of Mechanical Engineer for the Navy. Due to his abilities, the government sent him to Italy to further his training.

In July 1931, he visited Argentina, where he was assigned as a "musical ambassador," performing with great success at the Teatro La Pena and on Radio Splendid.

In 1933, he gave his last concert at the SODRE before leaving for the United States, where he served as a Naval Attaché for the Uruguayan embassy and remained for seven years. During his time in that country, he was an exclusive artist for NBC, giving several concerts. He recorded for the Columbia and RCA Victor labels and was the first musician to give a televised recital, which took place in 1934.

He was invited by President Franklin Delano Roosevelt to give a concert at the White House, and at the end of it, the president presented him with a guitar made for the occasion, as well as an autographed photograph. Another of his notable performances was as a soloist with the New York Philharmonic, with an audience of over 18,000 spectators. He later went on to give concerts in several Caribbean countries.

Back in Uruguay in 1941, he embarked on a series of concerts, performing in Montevideo and various locations throughout the country, as well as in several places in Brazil and Argentina. The following year, he returned to his hometown, where he resided until 1947. During the period of 1942–1946, he held the position of Chief of Police of the department. He later moved to Montevideo and began a new concert tour that took him to various countries in South America.

Many of his recordings were made for RCA, although the Uruguayan label Orfeo also has several of his recordings. Almost 60 years after his recordings for RCA, this label released part of his discography in volumes 1 and 8 of the collection Andrés Segovia And His Contemporaries.

== Discography ==
- Side 1 La Paloma Side 2 AY, AY, AY. Side 3.Waltz in A Major Op.39, N°15, Side 4 Kujawiak in A Minor_Op.3 Side 5 Elégie -Op.10 Side 6 Serenade. (DECCA Album 118)
- Andalucia (Homenaje a Manjón)5474-X (CO 19793)
- Arabia 5474-X (CO 19792)
- 1.Cigue 2. Gavotte 3.Fugue (Francois Campion) (Columbia 17110-D CO 21509-1)
- 1 Air. 2.Sonatina (Francois Campion)(Columbia 17110-D CO 21508-2)
- Preludio N°12, in A Minor.Preludio N°11 in D Major.Preludio N°6 in B Minor′′(F. Tárrega)(Columbia 17100-D CO 21471-3)
- Tremolo Study (F Tárrega) (Columbia 17100-D CO 21470-3)
- Sonata in A Major (Cimarosa)(Columbia 17118-D CO 21306-5)
- Gavotte (Rameau)(Columbia 17118-D CO-21567-1))
- Jota (Victor 37072-B)
- Latin American Folk Music vol. 1 (Decca A-174)
- Latin American Folk Music vol. 2 (Decca A-186)
- Latin American Folk Music vols. 1 & 2 (Decca DL 8018. Recoge los álbumes Latin American Folk Music 1 y 2 editados previamente por ese sello. 1950)
- Recital de Julio Martínez Oyanguren (Orfeo ULP 96)
- La música de España a través del tiempo y la guitarra (Orfeo ULP 99. 1960)
- Danza española nº5 / Danza española nº6 (Orfeo 110)
- Vidalita / Pericón (Orfeo 1004)
- Andres Segovia And His Contemporaries Vol.1: Segovia & Oyanguren (RCA. 2004)
- Andres Segovia And His Contemporaries Vol.8: Segovia & Oyanguren Part II (RCA. 2005)

== Bibliography ==
- Julio Martínez Oyanguren: una gran guitarra de Uruguay y América: aportes para su biografía, 1901–2001 (Oscar Padrón Favre. Tierradentro Ediciones, 2002).
