= Luigi Legnani =

Italian composer

Luigi Rinaldo Legnani (7 November 1790 – 5 August 1877) was an Italian virtuoso guitarist, singer, composer and luthier.

== Life ==
Born in Ravenna, Legnani was trained as a string player while very young but dedicated himself to guitar and voice. His debut as an operatic tenor was in Ravenna in 1807; his singing career spanned 17 years. His career as a guitarist began with a concert in Milan in 1819, and continued with the 1822 concerts in Vienna and return visits in 1833 and 1839. He tried to continue the guitar tradition established there by Mauro Giuliani.

== Music ==
Legnani is perhaps best known for his 36 Caprices op. 20 for the guitar, which cover all the major and minor keys, and which were probably inspired by Paganini's 24 Caprices for the violin. He and Paganini were friends from the 1830s; while it was once thought that he and Paganini performed together in public (Powroźniak mentions a concert in Northern Italy in 1837), there is no evidence to support this claim. After the 1850s Legnani retired from active performance and became an instrument maker, concentrating on guitars and violins. The "Legnani model" guitar was popular in Central Europe through the middle of the nineteenth century.

Legnani composed some 250 works, which were published in his lifetime throughout many of the major publishing houses in Europe. He died in Ravenna.

== Luthier ==
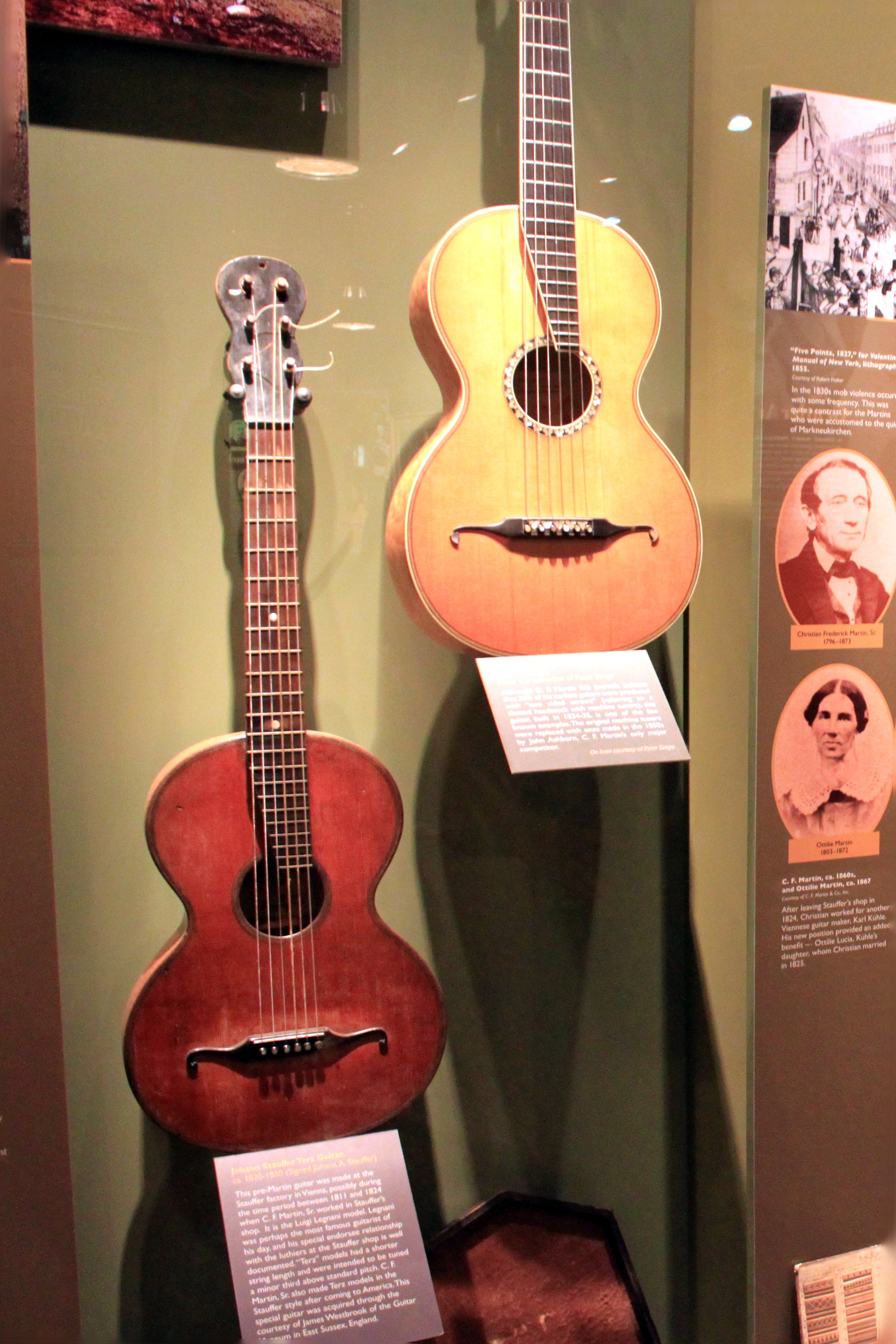

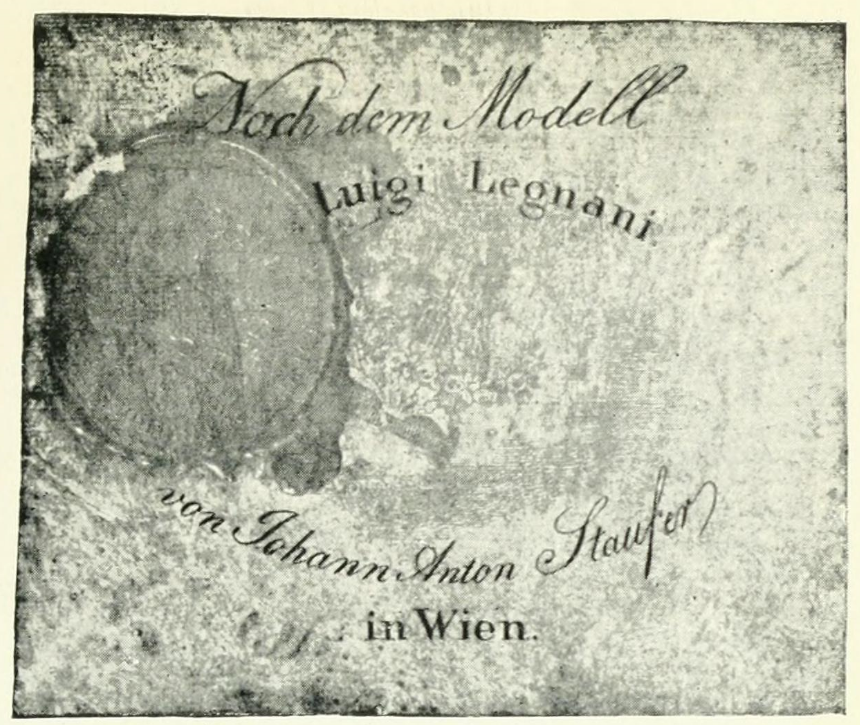

As a regular visitor to Vienna, Legnani cooperated with Johann Georg Stauffer and his son Anton to make guitars according to Legnani's design, to be followed by a number of other luthiers ("Nach dem Modell des Luigi Legnani" / "after the model of Luigi Legnani").

Later he began making his own guitars, and some of his instruments still exist:

- Guitar by Legnani
- Guitar of Legnani (ca.1870)

There is some confusion regarding the luthierie of Legnani, as there seems to have been a second (earlier) Luigi Legnani, an apprentice of Zosimo Bergonzi.
Sergio Monaldini affirms clearly that there is no reliable evidence that Legnani ever built a guitar or a violin, and there is no guitar signed by him.

== Bibliography ==
- Sergio Monaldini: Chitarra romantica. Luigi (Rinaldo) Legnani e il virtuosismo strumentale nell'Ottocento, Ravenna (Longo, 2015)
- In morte di Luigi Legnani by Antonio Zanca (1861–1958); (Milano : Tip. Lit. Degli Ingegneri, 1887) (Information about publication is found in Bibliografia italiana)
- Luigi Legnani by Romolo Ferrari 1, 2 (E. Bassi e nipoti, 1932)
- Teatro Carignano 28 Inglio 1855
- Appunti su una chitarra di Luigi Legnani by Ciurlo, Ernesto Fausto (1895–1978); Strumenti e Musica, XXIV, 1971, No. 2, page 70
- Introduction to "36 Caprices", by Simon Wynberg (Heidelberg: Chanterelle, 1986)
- Gazzelloni, Giuseppe, "Legnani, Luigi", in:The New Grove Dictionary of Music and Musicians (London: Macmillan, 2001)
