= Classical guitar pedagogy =

Theory and practice of learning to play

Classical guitar pedagogy is a collection of ideas, structures and patterns that are commonly used in teaching guitar. These standards include a variety of techniques and songs that incorporate these techniques to develop a player's abilities.

== Pedagogy ==
The classical guitar pedagogy is a collection of ideas, structures and patterns that are typical in teaching the instrument. These elements have been formalised by several music governing bodies, most notably ABRSM. These frameworks contain a rubric to teach classical guitar from novice to expert. The pedagogy includes physical techniques and a wide array of songs that encompass these techniques as well as developing breadth in the styles of classical guitar. Music theory is also taught throughout the pedagogy, as the teaching of classical guitar utilises many aspects of the general musical education.

== Classical guitar education ==
The classical guitar is today a standard instrument that can be studied at music universities and conservatories. Numerous education publications are available, from guitar-related books, to musical style, etc.

There are also institutions that offer worldwide graded music exams. Examples include:

- ABRSM: graded music exams from Grade 1 to Grade 8, or advanced diplomas
- Trinity College London: graded music exams from Grade 1 to Grade 8, Music Certificate Exams, or advanced diplomas

Articles which consider graded exams in the context of the classical guitar have been written by the EGTA (European Guitar Teachers Association).

== Music pedagogy ==
Classical guitar pedagogy also includes music pedagogy. Relevant publications from John Sloboda and others exist, which consider e.g.:

- Psychology of Music
- Philosophy of Music
- Music Education

== Classical guitar technique ==
Brad Conroy's lesson on simple right hand arppegios

== Bibliography ==
- Bibliography at the end of the article
