= Mats Scheidegger =

Swiss musician (born 1963)

Mats Scheidegger (born 1963) is a Swiss classical guitarist. Born in Baden, Switzerland, he specializes in contemporary music, e.g. he is the dedicatee of Sam Hayden's Sam Hayden AXE(S). He has given numerous premieres of contemporary works.

He was the artistic director of the "Tage für Neue Musik Zürich" festival from 1999 to 2011. He did many recordings for Labels such as Grammont, NMC-Records, Harmonia Mundi.
