= Romantic guitar =

Guitar of the Classical and Romantic period

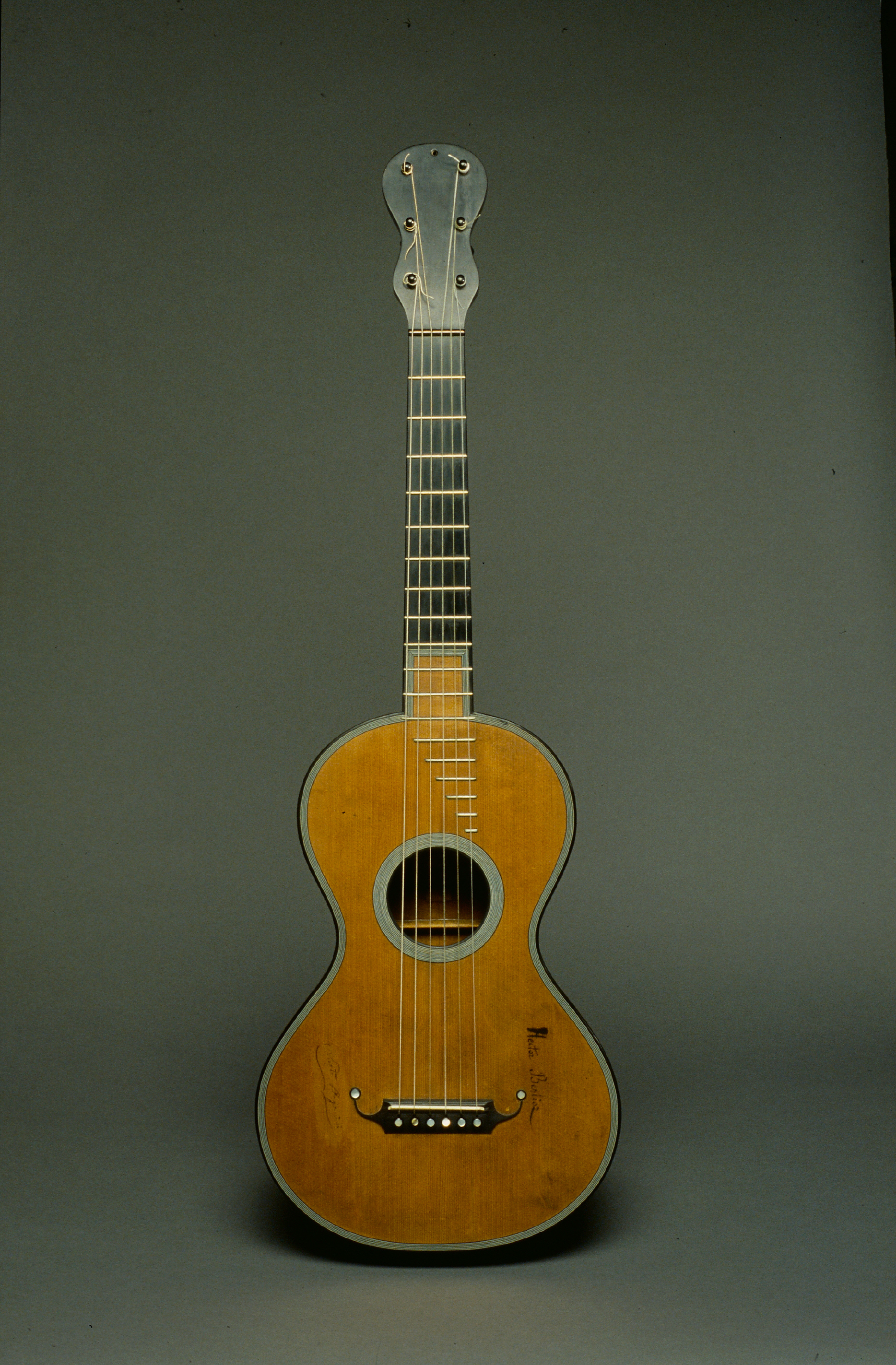
- Early Romantic guitar (c. 1830, Paris) by Jean-Nicolas Grobert (1794–1869)

String instrument
- Classification: String instrument (plucked)
- Hornbostel–Sachs classification: 321.322 (Composite chordophone)
- Inventor(s): Ferdinando Gagliano (first known)
- Developed: 18th century
- Attack: Fast

Related instruments
- List: Acoustic guitar; Baroque guitar; Classical guitar; Gittern; Lute; Parlor guitar

Builders
- List: Johann Georg Stauffer; René François Lacôte; Christian Frederick Martin; Antonio de Torres Jurado

The early romantic guitar, the guitar of the Classical and Romantic period, shows remarkable consistency from 1790 to 1830. Guitars had six or more single courses of strings while the Baroque guitar usually had five double courses (though the highest string might be single). The romantic guitar eventually led to Antonio de Torres Jurado's fan-braced Spanish guitars, the immediate precursors of the modern classical guitar.

From the late 18th century the guitar achieved considerable general popularity though, as Ruggero Chiesa stated, subsequent scholars have largely ignored its place in classical music. It was the era of guitarist-composers such as Fernando Sor, Ferdinando Carulli, Mauro Giuliani and Matteo Carcassi. In addition several well-known composers not generally linked with the guitar played or wrote for it: Luigi Boccherini and Franz Schubert wrote for it in several pieces, Hector Berlioz was a proficient guitarist who neither played keyboards nor received an academic education in music, the violin virtuoso Niccolò Paganini played guitar informally and Anton Diabelli produced a quantity of guitar compositions (see List of compositions by Anton Diabelli).

== History ==
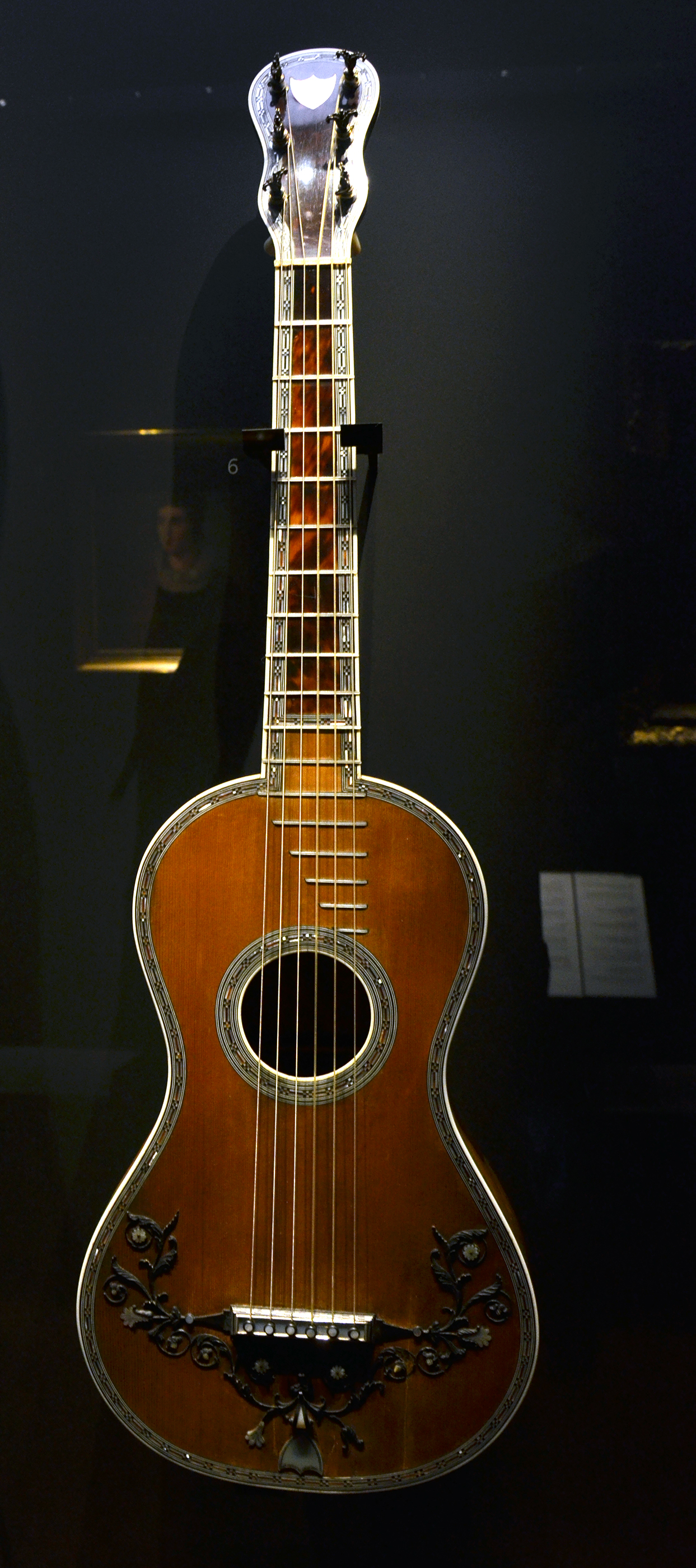
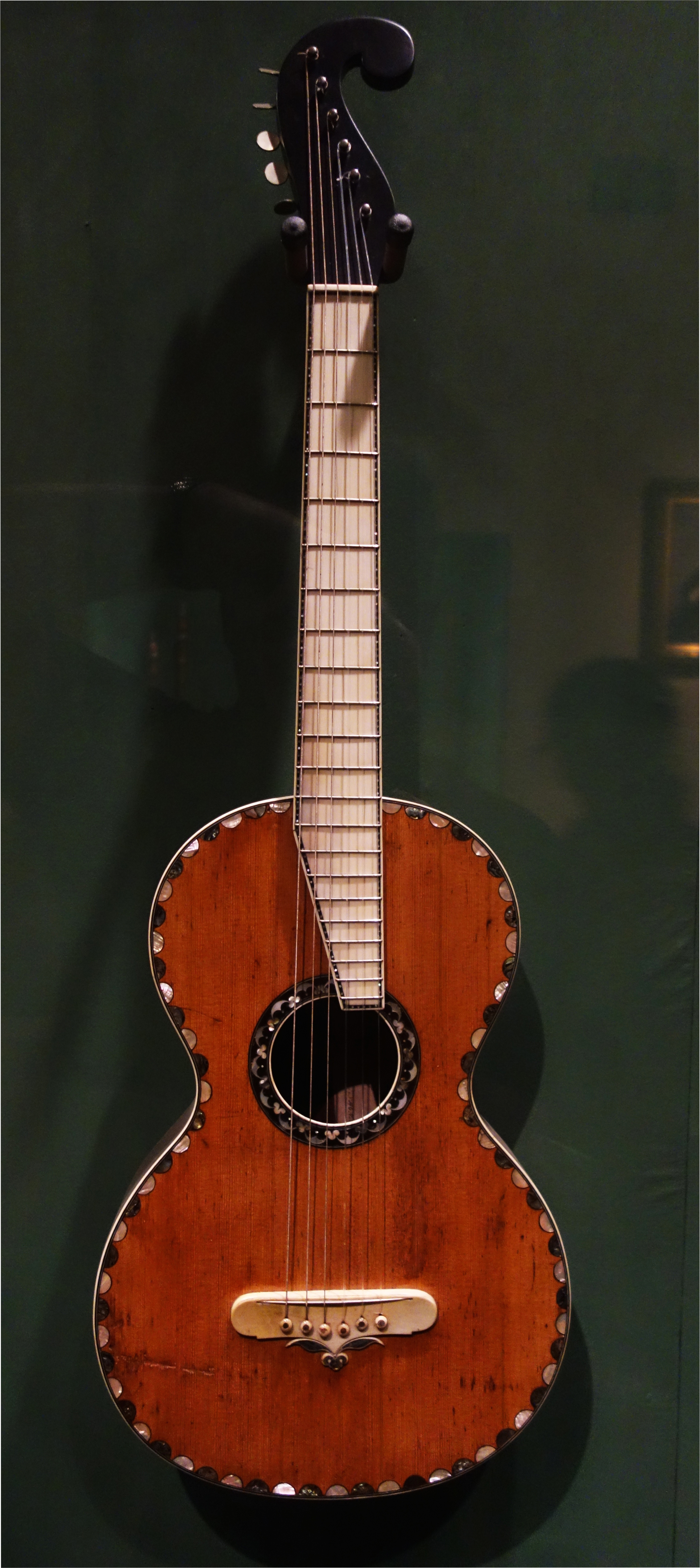
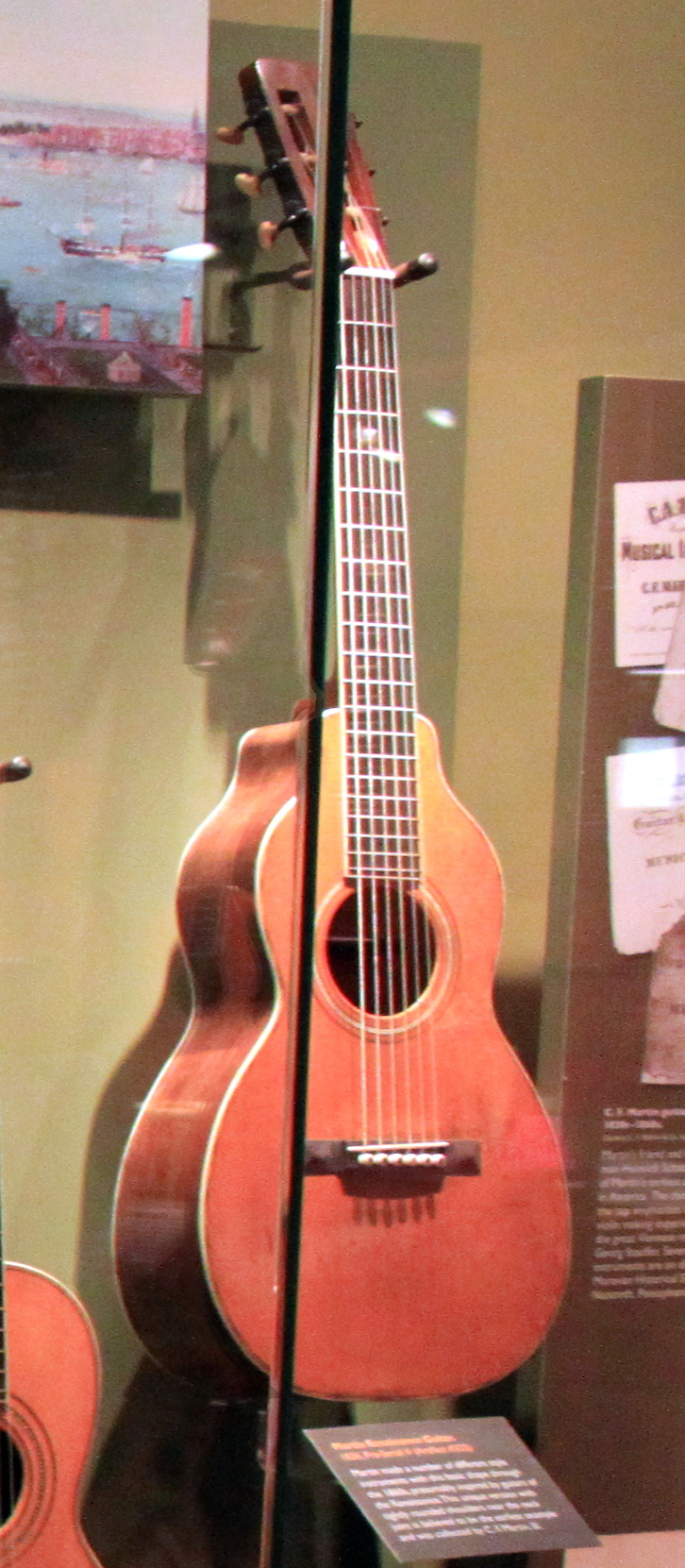
(Left): Guitar made by "Pons" in London, 1819. Musikmuseum, Basel; (middle): C.F. Martin guitar made in New York, c. 1838; (right): C.F. Martin Renaissance model, c. 1843–52

The first known guitar built to be strung with single strings rather than pairs of strings was built in 1774 by Ferdinando Gagliano in Naples. This guitar, which was displayed in the Heyer Museum, Cologne before that museum was dispersed, showed some important differences from the modern classical guitar. It had 5 single strings, inlaid brass frets, a long neck relative to string length (the fretboard meeting the body at the 11th fret), a pegged bridge and a characteristic figure-8 shaped tuning head. It lacked only a sixth string to make it identical with the early romantic guitar.

The earliest extant six-string guitar was built in 1779 by Gaetano Vinaccia (1759 – after 1831) in Naples, Italy. The Vinaccia family of luthiers is also known for developing the mandolin. This guitar shows no sign of modification from a double-course guitar. The authenticity of guitars before the 1790s is often in question. Moretti's 6-string method appeared in 1799.

Around the same time France also began to produce guitars with six single courses and Spain soon followed. Italian, French, and Spanish six-string guitars differed from the baroque guitar in similar ways. In addition to the advances already mentioned the guitar was gradually given more pronounced curves and a larger body while ornamentation was more restrained, remaining mostly around the edges of the body and the sound hole, which lacked a decorative rose to allow more volume. Frets were no longer of tied gut but fixed strips of some harder material, first ebony or ivory then metal. Wooden pegs were later replaced by metal tuning machines.

== Technique ==
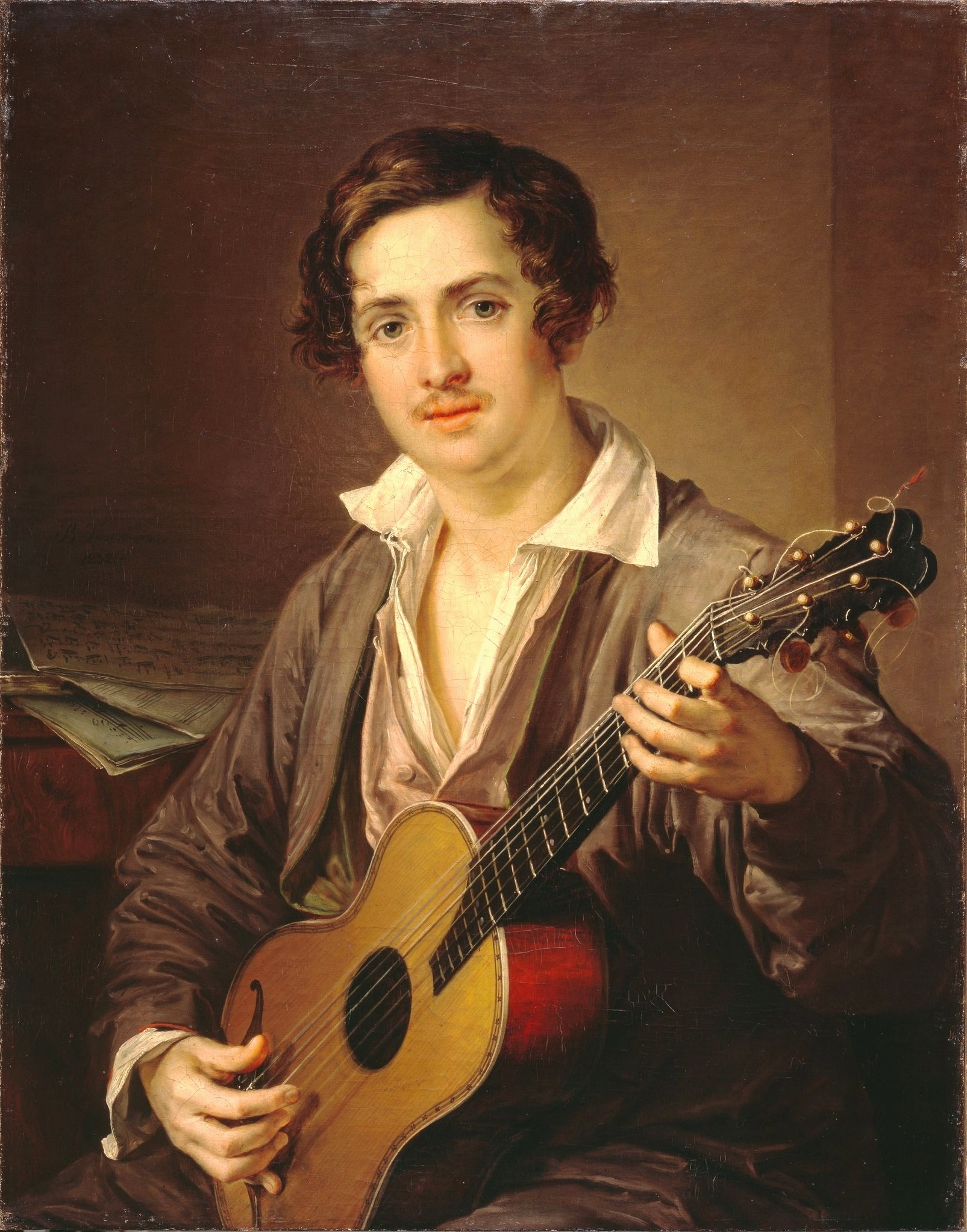
Guitarist playing, painted by Vasily Tropinin, 1832

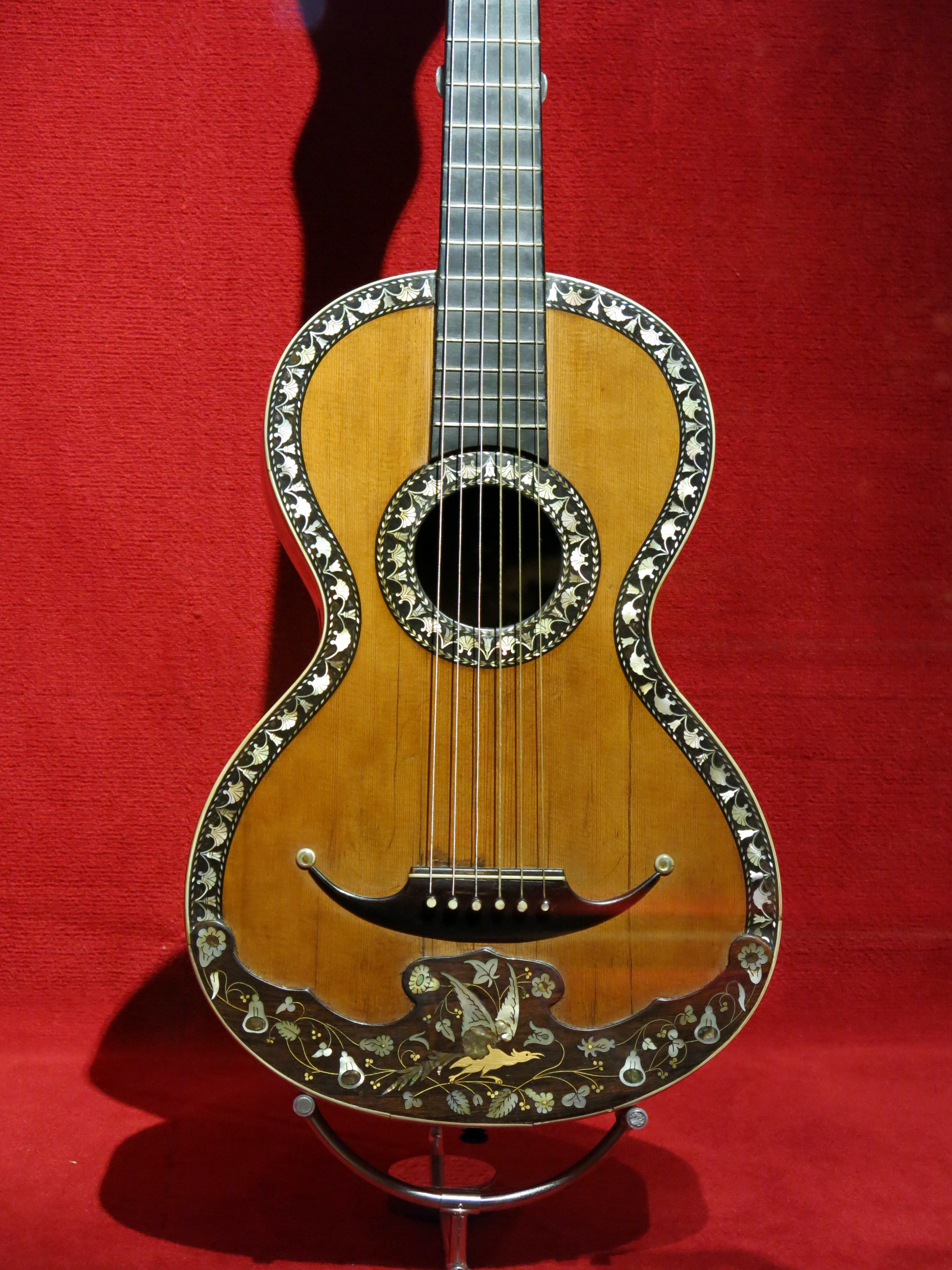
Romantic guitar exhibited at Museu de la Música de Barcelona

The many instructional books of the time show no standard playing technique but rather a reliance upon earlier traditions. For example, they often recommend that the right hand be supported on the guitar's table although the Spanish guitarist Nicario Juaralde took the modern view, warning against a loss of right-hand freedom. The thumb and first two fingers were mainly used for plucking with, in the 19th century, a free stroke (tirando) more commonly than the rest stroke (apoyando) that was favoured in the 20th century. Unlike most classical guitarists today, players were divided as to whether or not use fingernails. Fernando Sor, for example, did not use them while his compatriot Dionisio Aguado did.

The narrower fretboard of the romantic guitar allowed the left-hand thumb to be used by some guitarists to fret the sixth string although Fernando Sor deprecates this in his method, recommending that the left-hand thumb remain at the rear centre of the neck and noting that the "high" thumb position aids neither bass-string fingering nor support of the guitar. Romantic guitars often had a neck-strap around the player's neck while Dionisio Aguado invented a "tripodion" for holding the instrument. Aguado also advocated a relaxed posture, leaning back in a chair with both feet solidly on the ground rather than using a footstool to achieve the later conventional posture, the edge of the chair being used to keep the guitar from sliding down to the right, bringing the neck upward, closer to the player's torso, rather than projecting to the left.

== Composers ==
- Antoine de Lhoyer (1768–1852)
- Francesco Molino (1768–1847)
- Ferdinando Carulli (1770–1841)
- François de Fossa (1775–1849)
- Joseph Küffner (1776–1856)
- Fernando Sor (1778–1839)
- Anton Diabelli (1781–1858)
- Mauro Giuliani (1781–1829)
- Niccolò Paganini (1782–1840)
- Dionisio Aguado (1784–1849)
- Carl Blum (1786–1844)
- Charles Michael Alexis Sola (1786–1857)
- Matteo Carcassi (1792–1853)
- Josiah Andrew Hudleston (1799–1865)
- Johann Kaspar Mertz (1806–1856)
- Napoléon Coste (1805–1883)
- Adam Darr (1811–1866)
- Eduard Bayer (1822–1908)
- Giulio Regondi (1822–1872)
- Jacques Bosch (1825–1895)
- Julian Arcas (1832–1882)
- Francisco Tárrega (1852–1909)

== Luthiers ==
- Johann Georg Stauffer
- René François Lacôte
- Jean Nicolas Grobert
- Christian Frederick Martin
- Antonio de Torres Jurado
- Louis Panormo
- Joseph Pons
- Etienne Laprevotte
- Gennaro Fabricatore
