= Guitar solo =

Passage or section of music designated for a guitar

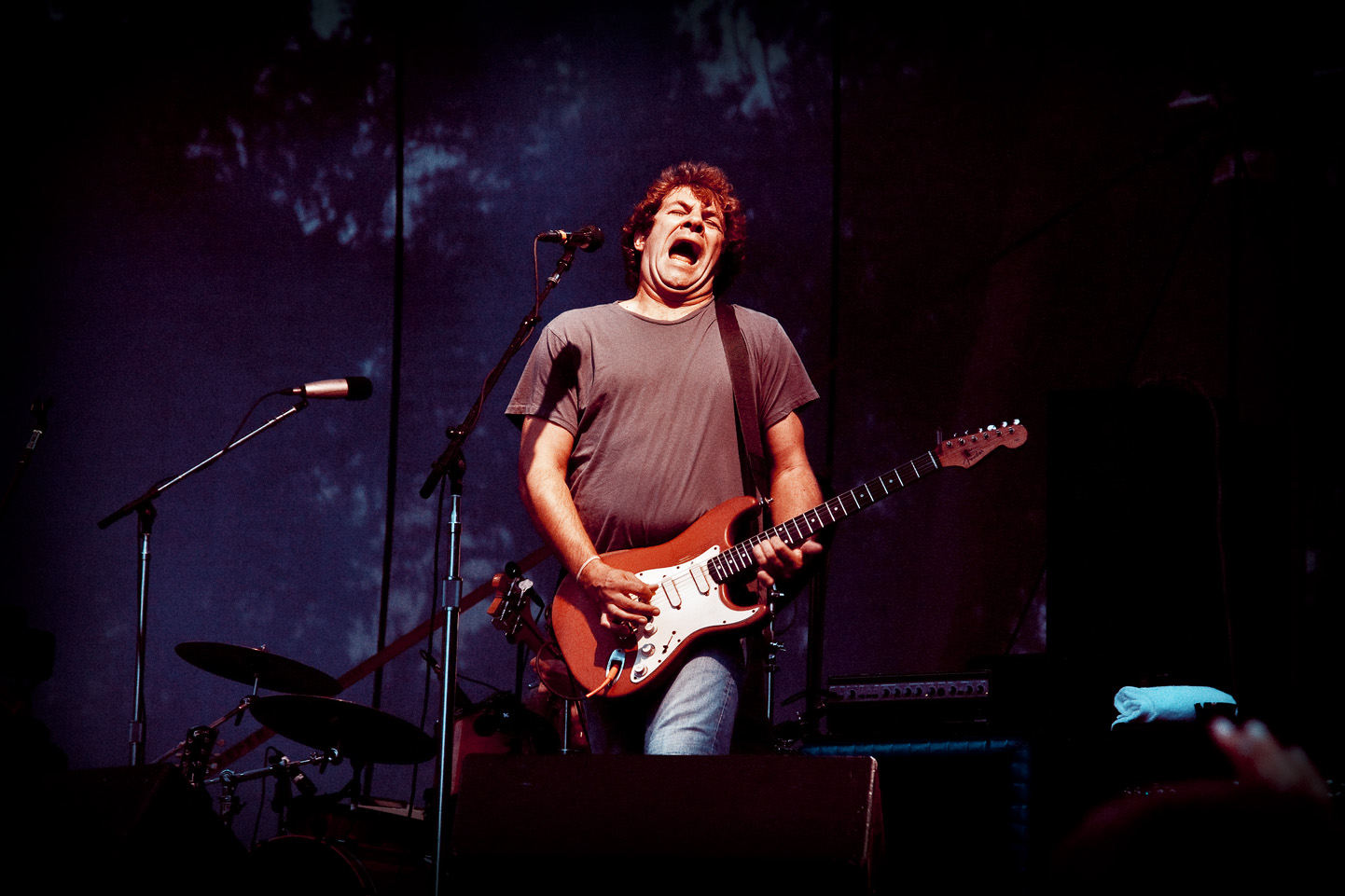
- Guitarist Dean Ween soloing
- Etymology: solo played on guitar
- Stylistic origins: Blues, Rock music, Jazz

Example
An electric guitar solo in F# minor

A guitar solo is a melodic passage, instrumental section, or entire piece of music, pre-written (or improvised) to be played on a classical, electric, or acoustic guitar. In 20th and 21st century traditional music and popular music such as blues, swing, jazz, jazz fusion, rock and heavy metal, guitar solos often contain virtuoso techniques and varying degrees of improvisation. Guitar solos on classical guitar, which are typically written in musical notation, are also used in classical music forms such as chamber music and concertos.

Guitar solos range from unaccompanied works for a single guitar to compositions with accompaniment from a few other instruments or a large ensemble. The accompaniment musicians for a guitar solo can range from a small ensemble such as a jazz quartet or a rock band, to a large ensemble such as an orchestra or big band. Unaccompanied acoustic guitar music is found in folk and classical music dating as far back as the instrument's first use in western music, the use of an acoustic guitar as a solo voice within an ensemble dates back at least to the Baroque concerto.

== Classical guitar ==
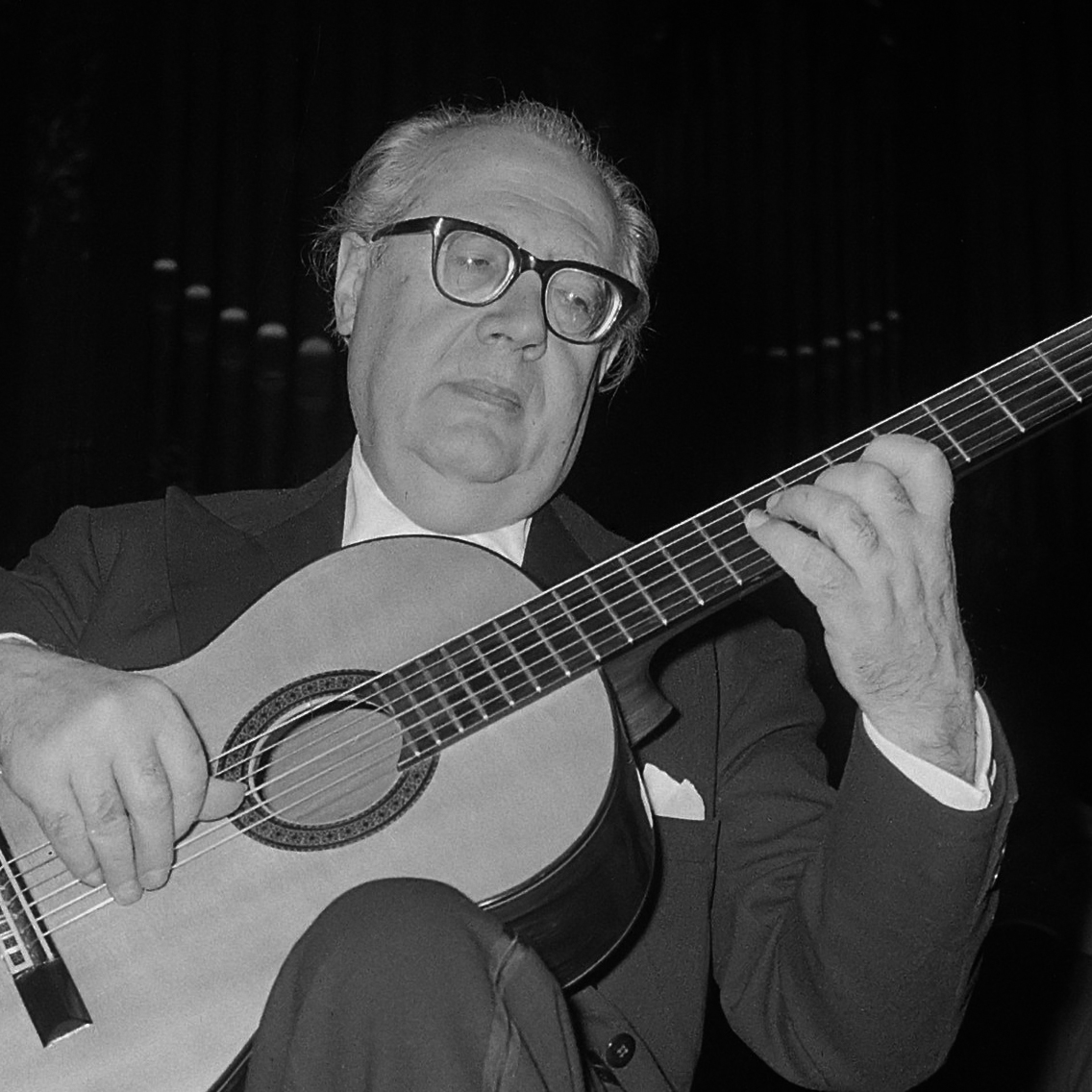
Classical guitar soloist Andrés Segovia (1962)

The classical guitar is an acoustical wooden guitar with six strings, usually nylon, as opposed to the metal strings used in metal stringed acoustic guitars used in other genres. Classical guitar is typically played by plucking individual strings with the fingernails or the fingertips. A classical guitar solo concert is typically called a recital; it may include a variety of works, e.g. works written originally for the lute or vihuela by composers such as John Dowland (b. Ireland 1563) and Luis de Narváez (b. Spain c. 1500), and also music written for the harpsichord by Domenico Scarlatti (b. Italy 1685), for the baroque lute by Sylvius Leopold Weiss (b. Germany 1687), for the baroque guitar by Robert de Visée (b. France c. 1650) or even Spanish-inspired music written for the piano by Isaac Albéniz (b. Spain 1860) and Enrique Granados (b. Spain 1867). Johann Sebastian Bach (b. Germany 1685) is another composer who did not write for the guitar specifically, but whose music is often played on it as his baroque lute works have proved highly adaptable to the instrument.

Of music written originally for guitar, the earliest influential composers stem from the classical period. They include Fernando Sor (b. Spain 1778) and Mauro Giuliani (b. Italy 1781), it is noted that their music can be seen to be potentially influenced by Viennese classicism. In the 19th century guitar composers such as Johann Kaspar Mertz (b. Slovakia, Austria 1806) were influenced by music written for the piano. I Francisco Tárrega (b. Spain 1852) wrote more uniquely guitar music, incorporating stylized aspects of flamenco's Moorish influences into his romantic miniatures. This was part of late 19th century European trend towards musical nationalism. Albéniz and Granados contributed to this movement as they wrote within the same time period.

Some classical guitarists play concertos, which are solos written for performance with the accompaniment of an orchestra. Fewer classical guitar concertos have been written compared to concertos for multi-instrumental orchestras. Some potentially notable ones could include Joaquín Rodrigo's Concierto de Aranjuez and Fantasía para un gentilhombre. In the 2000s, it has been noted that classical guitar is appearing more in classical music, as contemporary composers are increasingly writing guitar concertos.

=== History ===
Composers of the Renaissance period who wrote for four course guitar include Alonso Mudarra, Miguel de Fuenllana, Adrian Le Roy and Guillaume de Morlaye. Composers of the baroque guitar include Gaspar Sanz, Robert de Visée and Francesco Corbetta. From approximately 1780 to 1850, the guitar had composers and performers including: Filippo Gragnani (1767–1820), Antoine de Lhoyer (1768–1852), Ferdinando Carulli (1770–1841), Francesco Molino (1774–1847), Fernando Sor (1778–1839), Mauro Giuliani (1781–1829), Niccolò Paganini (1782–1840), Dionisio Aguado (1784 – 1849), Luigi Legnani (1790–1877), Matteo Carcassi (1792–1853), Napoléon Coste (1805–1883) and Johann Kaspar Mertz (1806–1856). Guitar soloist Andrés Segovia popularized the guitar with tours and early phonograph recordings in the 1920s. Modern classical guitar solo performers who are known for playing modern repertoire include Kazuhito Yamashita, Agustín Barrios, Paul Galbraith, and John Williams.

== Traditional and popular music ==
=== Blues, R&B and rock and roll ===
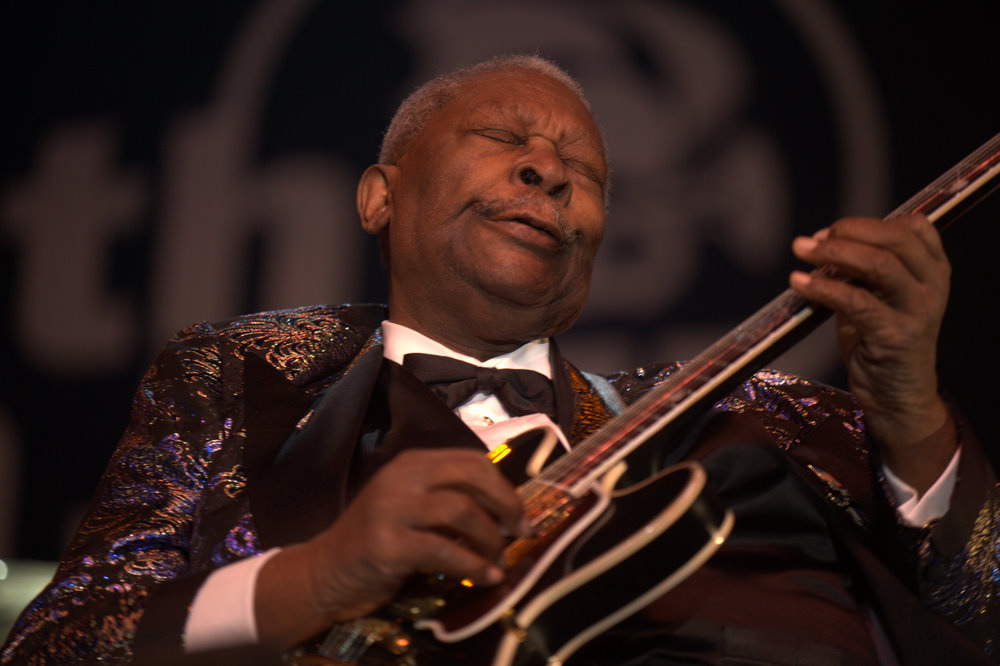
American blues guitarist and singer B.B. King in 2009

The term "guitar solo" often refers to electric guitar solos played in blues and in rock. The use of a guitar solo as an instrumental interlude was developed by blues musicians such as Lonnie Johnson, John Lee Hooker, Muddy Waters, and T-Bone Walker, and jazz like Charlie Christian. Ernest Tubb's 1940 honky tonk classic, "Walking the Floor over You" was the first "hit" recording to feature and highlight a solo by a standard electric guitar—though earlier hits featured electric lap steel guitars.

Howlin' Wolf, Muddy Waters, Willie Dixon, and Jimmy Reed played in Chicago in a style characterized by the use of electric guitar, sometimes slide guitar, harmonica, and a rhythm section of bass and drums. In the late 1950s, a new blues style emerged on Chicago's West Side pioneered by Magic Sam, Buddy Guy and Otis Rush on Cobra Records. The 'West Side Sound' had strong rhythmic support from a rhythm guitar, bass guitar and drums and as perfected by Guy, Freddie King, Magic Slim and Luther Allison was dominated by amplified electric lead guitar. Other blues artists, such as John Lee Hooker had influences not directly related to the Chicago style. John Lee Hooker's blues is more "personal," based on Hooker's deep rough voice accompanied by a single electric guitar.

These and other blues guitarists as well as the fast-picking techniques derived from country and bluegrass inspired the appearance of many virtuoso blues rock fusion soloists, beginning in 1963 with Lonnie Mack's first major recordings. Jimi Hendrix was a psychedelic guitarist, and a pioneer in the use of distortion and audio feedback in his music. Through these artists and others, blues music influenced the development of rock music. Another important blues rock guitar soloist in the 1960s and 1970s was Eric Clapton. In the early 1970s, the Texas rock-blues style emerged, which used guitars in both solo and rhythm roles (e.g., Stevie Ray Vaughan).

=== Rock ===
The earliest rock guitar solos, as exemplified by popular recordings of Duane Eddy and Link Wray in the late 1950s, were relatively simple instrumental melodies. In the early 1960s, instrumental surf music represented a step forward in the sonic complexity of rock guitar melodies. In 1963, the dramatic, technically advanced electric guitar solo rose to the fore with Lonnie Mack's hit records, "Memphis" and "Wham!" (later covered by The Ventures, Stevie Ray Vaughan and others), and soon, with the advent of blues rock and psychedelic rock in the mid-late 1960s, became a characteristic part of rock music. Later still, guitar solos became a defining feature of the rock genre of heavy metal, in which most songs feature a solo. Metal solos often showcase the virtuosity of the guitarists, especially in metal styles that use shred guitar techniques for rapid playing of scales and arpeggios. Since the 1960s, electric guitarists have often altered the timbre of their guitar adding electronic guitar effects such as reverb, distortion, delay, and chorus to make the sound fuller and add harmonic overtones. Other effects used in solos include the wah-wah pedal and the talk box.

Rock bands often have two guitarists, designated "lead" and "rhythm", with the lead player performing the solos and instrumental melody lines while the rhythm player accompanies with chords or riffs. In some cases, two guitarists share the lead role. Most rock music is based around songs in traditional forms. The main formal features are verses, choruses, and bridges. The guitar solo is usually the most significant instrumental section of a mainstream rock song. In other rock-related genres, such as pop and dance music, the synthesizer usually plays this role.

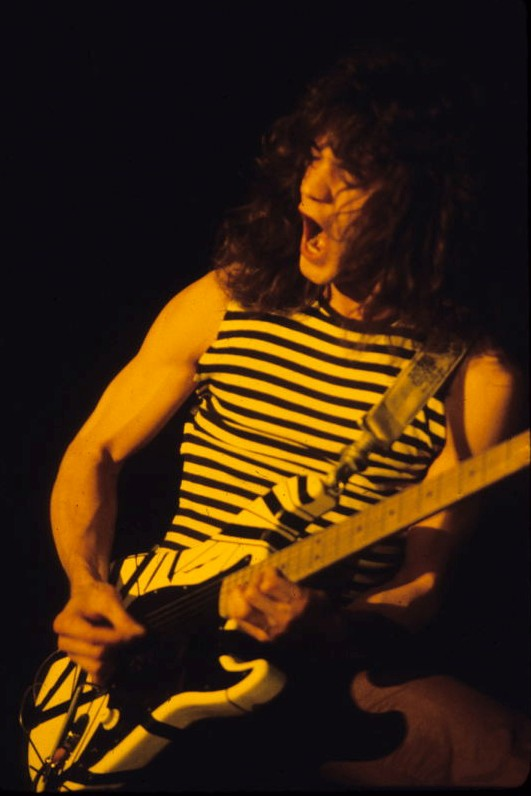
Eddie Van Halen in 1977

In classic verse–chorus form, it often falls between the second chorus and third verse. Extended guitar solos are sometimes used as a song's outro, such as Christopher Cross' "Ride Like the Wind", Radiohead's "Paranoid Android", Lynyrd Skynyrd's "Free Bird", The Stooges' "I Wanna Be Your Dog", Pink Floyd's "Comfortably Numb", Guns N' Roses' "November Rain", Metallica's "Fade to Black", Led Zeppelin's "Black Dog", Journey's "Who's Crying Now", The Cult's "Love Removal Machine", The Beatles' "While My Guitar Gently Weeps", .38 Special's "Hold On Loosely", The Rolling Stones' "Sway", Pearl Jam's "Alive", Red Hot Chili Peppers' "Dani California", Cream's "White Room", AC/DC's "Let There Be Rock", Outlaws' "Green Grass and High Tides", The Alan Parsons Project's "Eye in the Sky" and Eagles' "Hotel California".

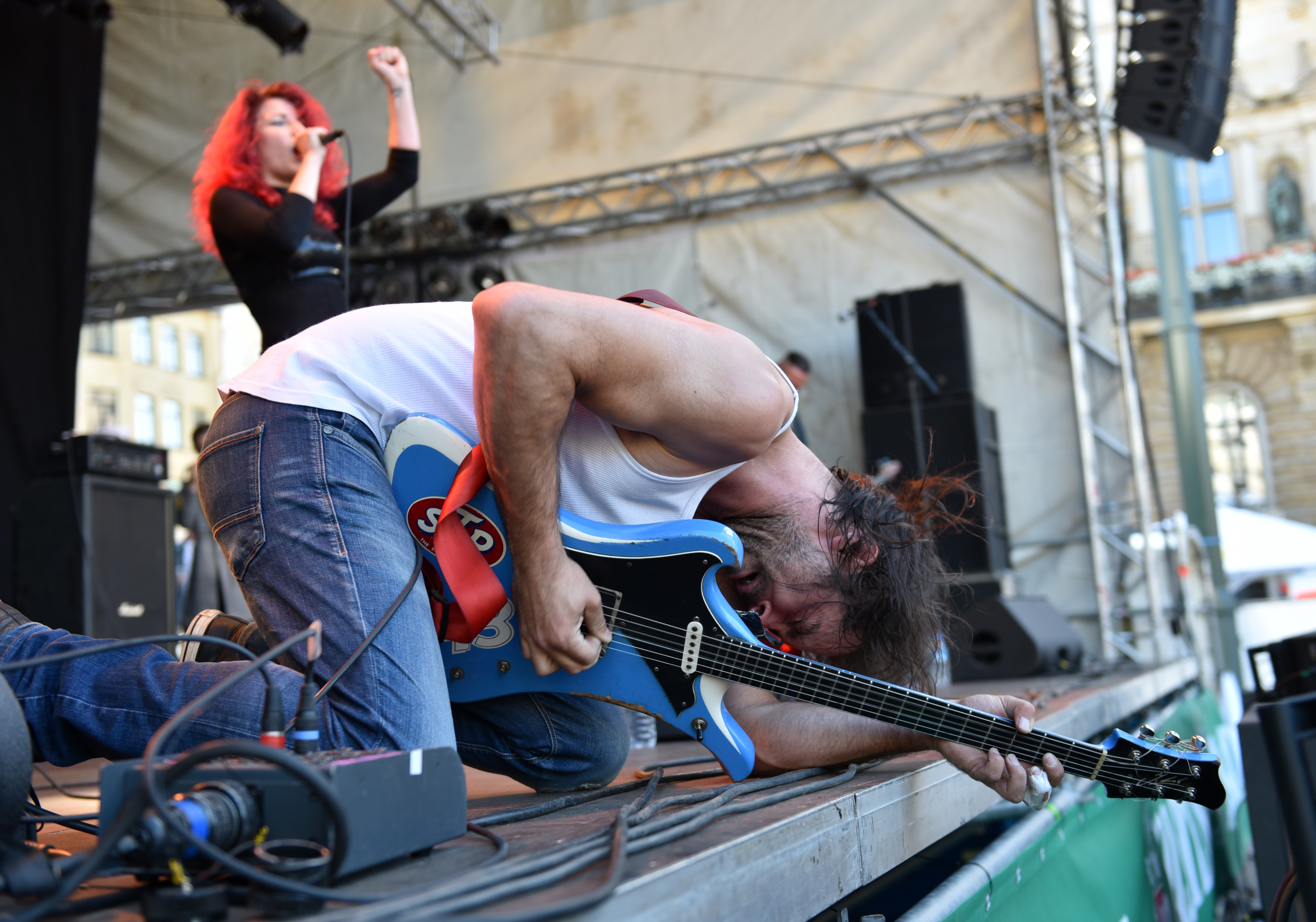
Guitar solo

Solos can take place in the intro, such as "Voodoo Child (Slight Return)" by Jimi Hendrix, "Since I've Been Loving You" by Led Zeppelin, "One" by Metallica, "Lazy" by Deep Purple, "I Want It All" by Queen, "Johnny B. Goode" by Chuck Berry, "Don't Take Me Alive" by Steely Dan, "Sails of Charon" by Scorpions and "Wish You Were Here" by Pink Floyd. In rarer cases, the guitar solo may come after the first chorus as opposed to the second, such as "Beast and the Harlot" by Avenged Sevenfold, "The Importance of Being Idle" by Oasis and "Black Summer" by Red Hot Chili Peppers.

The use of guitar solos in hard rock and heavy metal was notable during the 1980s, when rapid-fire "shredding" solos were common; a virtuoso lead guitarist of a band might be more well-known than the singer (although in a few cases one artist held both roles). During this time, players began to use advanced harmonics techniques more widely. Later, guitarists who had developed considerable technical facility began to release albums with instrumental-only guitar compositions. Guitar solos in popular music waned in fashion in the middle 1990s, coinciding with the rise in popularity of nu metal and grunge. Nu metal differed significantly from previous sub-genres of metal and abandoned guitar solos almost entirely: most songs featured sparse lead fills here and there and full-fledged solos were rare. Whereas, grunge did not wholly abandon full-fledged solos and included them with some regularity. Guitar solos likewise became less prominent in many pop and popular rock music styles; either being trimmed down to a short four-bar transition or omitted entirely, in a vast departure from the heavy usage of solos in classic rock music from the 1960s, 1970s, 1980s, and early 1990s. Classic rock revival music heavily features soloing, along with classic rock bands that are still active.

Occasionally, a song contains a two-part guitar solo with both rhythm and lead guitar taking solos (e.g., "Master of Puppets" by Metallica), or dual solos with both lead and rhythm playing complementary solos—such as with Twisted Sister's "30", Iron Maiden's "Hallowed Be Thy Name", "The Trooper", Megadeth's "Holy Wars... The Punishment Due" or Deep Purple’s "Highway Star". Some rock bands use harmonized dual lead guitar solos as part of their signature sound, such as Wishbone Ash and Lovebites. This was first popularized by the Allman Brothers Band in their album At Fillmore East.

=== Bass guitar solos ===
The bass guitar is played through a specialized amplifier to make the instrument louder and provided control over tone. The bass guitar came into use in popular music in the 1950s. While bass guitar solos are not common in popular music, some bands include bass solos in some songs, particularly heavy metal, funk, and progressive rock bands. Some genres use bass guitar solos in most songs, such as jazz bands or jazz fusion groups. Bass solos are also common in certain styles of punk music. In a rock context, bass guitar solos are structured and performed in a similar fashion as rock guitar solos, often with the musical accompaniment from the verse or chorus sections. While bass guitar solos appear on few studio albums from rock or pop bands, genres such as progressive rock, fusion-influenced rock, and some types of heavy metal are more likely to include bass solos, both in studio albums and in live performances.

Players perform bass solos with a range of techniques, such as plucking or finger picking. In the 1960s, The Who's bassist, John Entwistle, performed a bass break on the song "My Generation" using a plectrum, though he intended to use his fingers—he simply could not drop the plectrum quickly enough. Many consider this one of the first bass solos in rock music, and one of the most recognizable. John Paul Jones of Led Zeppelin, on "Good Times Bad Times", the first song on their first album, uses two bass solos in an influentially dynamic way, as a bridge (when the band drops out after the choruses) to the next verse (after the first chorus) and the guitar solo-driven coda (after the third chorus). Queen's bassist, John Deacon, occasionally played bass solos, notably in "Under Pressure" and "Liar". In the 1970s, Aerosmith's bassist, Tom Hamilton, played a bass intro on the song "Sweet Emotion" from their album Toys in the Attic. Thrash metal group Metallica's 1983 debut album Kill 'Em All features a solo by bassist Cliff Burton on "(Anesthesia) Pulling Teeth", which some consider his greatest work. John McVie of Fleetwood Mac performed a notable bass solo on "The Chain" from the record-setting 1977 album Rumours.

Manowar's bassist Joey DeMaio uses special piccolo bass for his extremely fast bass solos like "Sting of the Bumblebee" and "William's Tale". Green Day bassist Mike Dirnt played a bass solo on the song "No One Knows" from the 1992 album Kerplunk! and on the song "Makeout Party" from the 2012 album ¡Dos!. U2 includes a bass solo most notably on "Gloria", in which Adam Clayton utilizes several techniques. Bassist Matt Freeman of Rancid has a very speedy, guitar-like bass solo in the song '"Maxwell Murder". Blink-182's "Voyeur" has a bass solo on both their studio album Dude Ranch and their live album The Mark, Tom and Travis Show (The Enema Strikes Back!), in which they must "prepare for the bass solo."

Heavy metal bass players such as Geezer Butler (Black Sabbath), Alex Webster (Cannibal Corpse), Cliff Burton (Metallica), jazz fusion bassist Jaco Pastorius (Weather Report), and Les Claypool (Primus, Blind Illusion) used chime-like harmonics and rapid plucking techniques in their bass solos. Geddy Lee of Rush performed a number of solos, most notably in "YYZ". Also, in both published Van Halen concert videos, Michael Anthony performs unique maneuvers and actions during his solos. Funk bassists, such as Larry Graham, began using slapping and popping techniques for their bass solos, which coupled a percussive thumb-slapping technique of the lower strings with an aggressive finger-snap of the higher strings, often in rhythmic alternation. The slapping and popping technique incorporates a large number of muted (or 'ghost' tones) to normal notes to add to the rhythmic effect. Slapping and popping solos were prominent in 1980s pop and R&B, and they are still used by some 2000s-era funk and Latin bands.

Bass effects such as fuzz bass or wah-wah pedals to produce a more pronounced sound can be used when playing bass solos, hard rock and heavy metal bassists. Notably, Cliff Burton of Metallica used both distortion and wah-wah. Bass guitar solos have a much lighter accompaniment than solos for other instruments due to the lower range of the bass. The bass guitar solo can also be unaccompanied or accompanied only by the drums.

== See also ==
- Drum solo
- Ostinato

== Bibliography ==
- Atlas, Allan W. "Anthology of Renaissance music: Music in Western Europe, 1400-1600 " New York: W.W. Norton, 1998.
- Berg, Christopher. The Classical Guitar Companion New York, NY: Oxford University Press, 2019.
- Bohlman, Philip V. Focus: Music, Nationalism, and the Making of the New Europe. London: Routledge, 2011.
- Goetz, Philip, ed. (1990). Encyclopædia Britannica. Vol. 5 (Fifteenth ed.). Chicago. p. 982. ISBN 0-85229-511-1..
- O'Toole, Michael. John Williams : Changing the Culture of the Classical Guitar : Performance, Perception, Education and Construction Abingdon, Oxon: New York, NY : Routledge, 2019.
- Tomalin, Marcus. "Lutes, Vihuelas and Guitars—filling in Some Gaps." Early music 46, no. 4 (2018): 694–697.
- Randall Zwally. "William Kanengiser: Classical Guitar and Beyond." Notes 64, no. 1 (2007): 128–129.
