= Carl Oscar Boije af Gennäs =

Swedish collector of guitar sheet music

Carl Oscar (Oskar) Boije af Gennäs (7 July 1849 – 24 December 1923), was a Swedish collector of guitar sheet music.

== Career ==
Boije af Gennäs was born in Hasslövs socken, Halland County, Sweden in 1849. He was a descendant of the Swedish-Finnish noble family Boije af Gennäs and worked as a clerk at the life insurance company Victoria, in Stockholm.

Boije af Gennäs was also an amateur guitarist and composer. He composed Marcia Funebre in memory of Otto Hammerer. The piece was published in Freie Vereinigung zur Förderung guter Guitarmusik, eingetragener Verein, Sitz i Augsburg, (Free Society for the promotion of good Guitar-music, seat at Augsburg), April 1905, volume 8.

In addition to his music compositions, Boije af Gennäs was a guitar music collector, particularly of music originating in the 19th century. His collection included nearly 1,000 works, including sheet music by Dionisio Aguado, Matteo Carcassi, Ferdinando Carulli, Mauro Giuliani, Luigi Rinaldo Legnani and Fernando Sor.

The collection also contained original manuscripts by Johann Kaspar Mertz and was donated in 1924 to The Music and Theatre Library of Sweden (formerly The Music Library of Sweden and earlier The Library of The Swedish Academy of Music) in Stockholm. The collection is digitized and is available online via Boijes collection at the Music and Theatre Library of Sweden.
