= Méthode pour la Guitare =

The Méthode pour la guitare is a method for the classical guitar originally written in French by Spanish guitarist and composer Fernando Sor.

The method was written with the early romantic guitar in mind (Sor mentions some 19th-century guitar-builders: J. Panormo, Schroeder of Petersburg, Alonso of Madrid, Pages and Benitez of Cadiz, Joseph and Manuel Martinez of Malaga, Rada, and Lacôte of Paris), but it is not only about instrumental technique, but also includes details about the theory of scales, harmony, sonority, composition, and above all music as an art.

== French and German edition ==
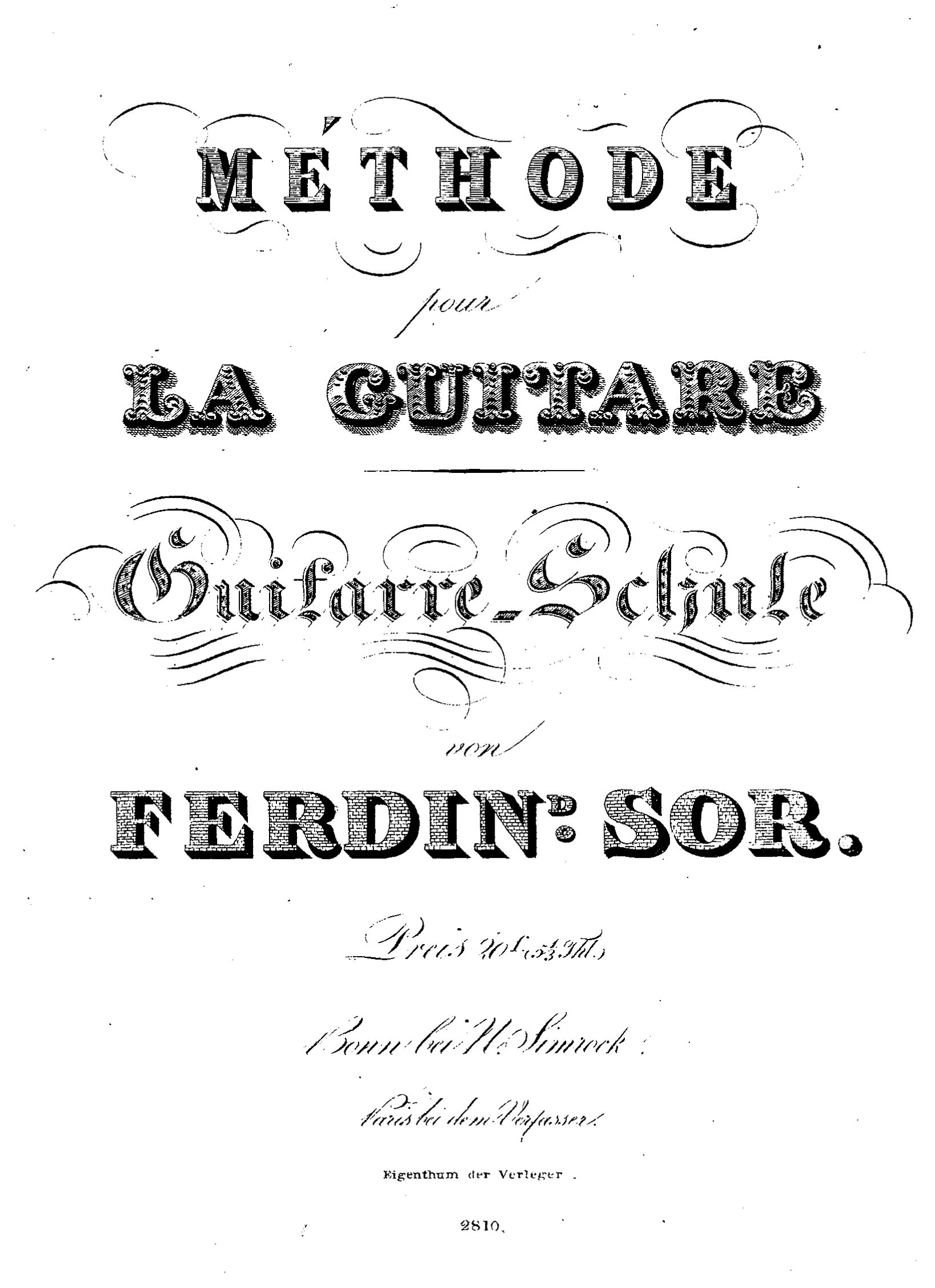
Méthode pour la guitare

The first edition was in French and appeared in Paris in 1830 with the title of Méthode pour la guitare par Ferdinand Sor. Brian Jeffery (the modern publisher of A. Merrick's old English translation) mentions: "It is the only version known to have Sor's direct authority. Now extremely rare, it was never reprinted; indeed, an early biographer of Sor (Baltasar Saldoni in his Diccionario de Efemérides de Músicos Españoles, I, Madrid, 1868) says (he does not state on what authority) that Sor destroyed the plates." During the same period Simrock in Bonn had brought out a parallel French and German edition.

== English edition ==
The English edition is a translation from the original in French made by A. Merrick, the organist of Cirencester, and published in London by Cocks & Co. probably in 1832, as Method for the Spanish Guitar. The French and German versions do not carry the word "Spanish" in the title. This version is today available from Brian Jeffery's.

Brian Jeffery mentions: "Later in the century, in 1897, Frank Mott Harrison published in London a Method for the Guitar by Ferdinando Sor, a work of small value which says (of course wrongly) that the original was written in Spanish."

== Coste's adapted and augmented version ==
After Sor's death, Napoléon Coste, one of his pupils, published a revision of the original called Méthode complète pour la Guitare par Ferdinand Sor, rédigée et augmentée de nombreux exemples et leçons par N. Coste. Matanya Ophee states that in Coste's revised and augmented version, there is an introduction which is helpful in better understanding Sor, and some of the circumstances under which Sor wrote the original method.

Brian Jeffery controversially regards Coste's version somewhat negatively ("travesty of the original ... bears little resemblance to the original"), even though the title immediately makes it clear, that it is not the original, but was adapted and augmented by Coste (augmented incidentally, with numerous pieces of high quality). Today Coste's version is highly regarded in its own right (the title mentioning of Sor, possibly being more a sign of respect, than what Jeffery has termed "a disservice to his friend's memory"). Ophee has written: "He [Coste] is certainly not hostile to Sor and to his memory".

== Various details ==
In the method (in plate VII, example 27), Sor quotes bars 22 to 25 of Sonata Op. 35, No. 1 by Jan Ladislav Dussek; mentioning "that the celebrated Düssek had the texture of the orchestra in view when he wrote for the pianoforte the passage in example twenty-seventh, plate VII."
