= Josiah Andrew Hudleston =

Anglo-Irish civil servant, guitarist and composer

Josiah Andrew Hudleston (22 February 1799 – 19 August 1865) was an Anglo-Irish civil servant, guitarist and composer. The Hudleston Collection at the Royal Irish Academy of Music in Dublin, Ireland, is one of the largest collections of early 19th-century music for the guitar.

== Life ==
Hudleston was born in Bray, Berkshire (England). His father, John Hudleston (1749–1835), was an employee of the East India Company and a short-term (1805−6) Member of Parliament, while his mother came from County Donegal, Ireland. He was educated at Haileybury College, Hertfordshire, from 1815, and took up the guitar in the following year, possibly as a result of a visit to London by the Spanish guitarist Fernando Sor in April of this year.

Hudleston spent almost all of his life (1817–55) in India in various positions within the East India Company. In 1820, he was appointed Second Assistant to the Collector and Magistrate of Tinnevelly, in 1824 Head Assistant to the Registrar of the Sudder and Foujdarry Adawlut, Deputy Collector of Madras (1828–1831 and 1836–1843), and from 1831 to 1835 he was Superintendent of Stationery there. His most influential time came when he was Chief Collector at Madras from 1843 until his retirement in 1855, with some control over magisterial powers in the region.

He returned to England in March 1856, initially living with his brother in Cheltenham, Gloucestershire, where he probably met the prominent guitarist Giulio Regondi, who dedicated his well-known Ten Études to Hudleston, and Madame Sidney Pratten who published some of Hudleston's compositions. A year later, he moved to Killiney, County Dublin, Ireland, in 1857, where he probably met Regondi again in April 1861, when Regondi appeared three times at the Antient Concert Rooms in Dublin. He died in Killiney of a heart disease in 1865.

== The Hudleston Collection ==
In the course of several decades, Hudleston collected a large amount of published guitar music. The Hudleston Collection of solo and chamber music for guitar now consists of more than 1,100 printed works and more than 800 works in manuscript, making it one of the largest collections of its kind in the world. All of the works in the collection are by contemporaries of Hudleston. "The printed editions contain fingerings (always very well chosen), and notes and comments written in ink or pencil about when and for whom he had copied the works, or from whom he had received them." The collection was donated to the library of the Royal Irish Academy of Music in Dublin in 1877 by Hudleston's widow. It is "a valuable source, containing rare or unique copies of publications that have been used recently as the source for a number of forthcoming editions".

== Music ==
Hudleston's work as a composer and arranger began in Madras in the 1840s. He considered to write a guitar method, but only wrote a short treatise on harmonics on the guitar (unpublished). "Hudleston's original compositions are exclusively for solo guitar, and are mainly variations on popular songs and airs. They are all technically very demanding – rapid scales for the left hand alone, virtuoso arpeggios, tremolos and extended use of harmonics are all frequently encountered – although harmonically they are rather banal." He also wrote many arrangements of works by Beethoven, Bellini, Handel, Mozart, Paganini, and many others. Like his compositions, Hudleston's arrangements require a high technical proficiency.

== Editions ==
- Fernando Sor: 5 Song Arrangements from the Hudleston Manuscripts (Heidelberg: Chanterelle, 2010; ECH 0537); ISMN 979-0-2047-0537-5. Contains: Girolamo Crescentini: Nummi se giusti siete; Domenico Mombelli: La mia nice; Fernando Sor: Air Hongroise; Irene; Mi lagnerò.
