= René François Lacôte =

Guitar-maker (1785–1871)

René François Lacôte (1785–1871) was a Romantic guitar luthier from Paris, France. His guitars were played by guitarists such as Fernando Sor, Ferdinando Carulli, Dionisio Aguado, Napoléon Coste, and Marco Aurelio Zani de Ferranti. Musicologist René Vannes referred to Lacôte as the "Stradivarius of the guitar" in his book Universal Dictionary of Luthiers. Lacôte apprenticed to the luthier Joseph Pons. Fernando Sor mentioned in his book Méthode pour la Guitare that "M. Lacote, a French maker, the only person who, besides his talents, has proved to me that he possesses the quality of not being inflexible to reasoning".

== Gallery ==
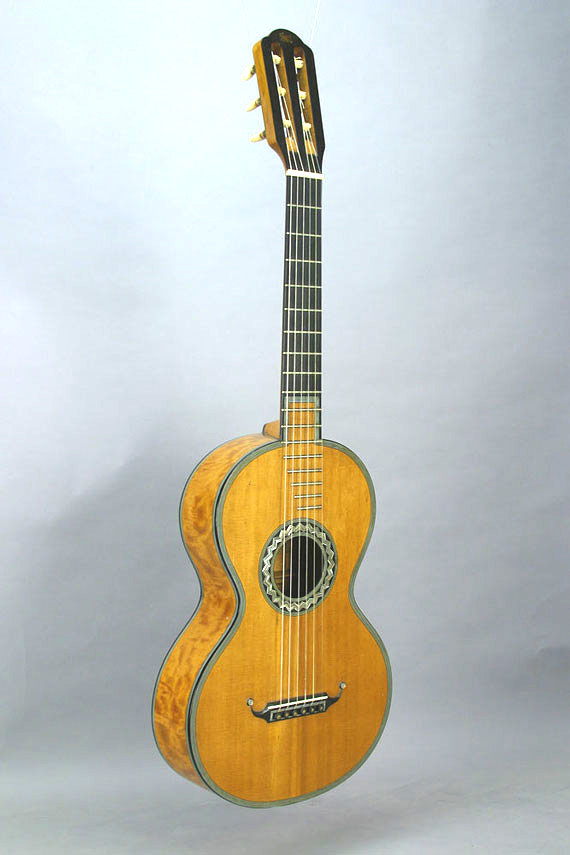
1836 Lacôte guitar

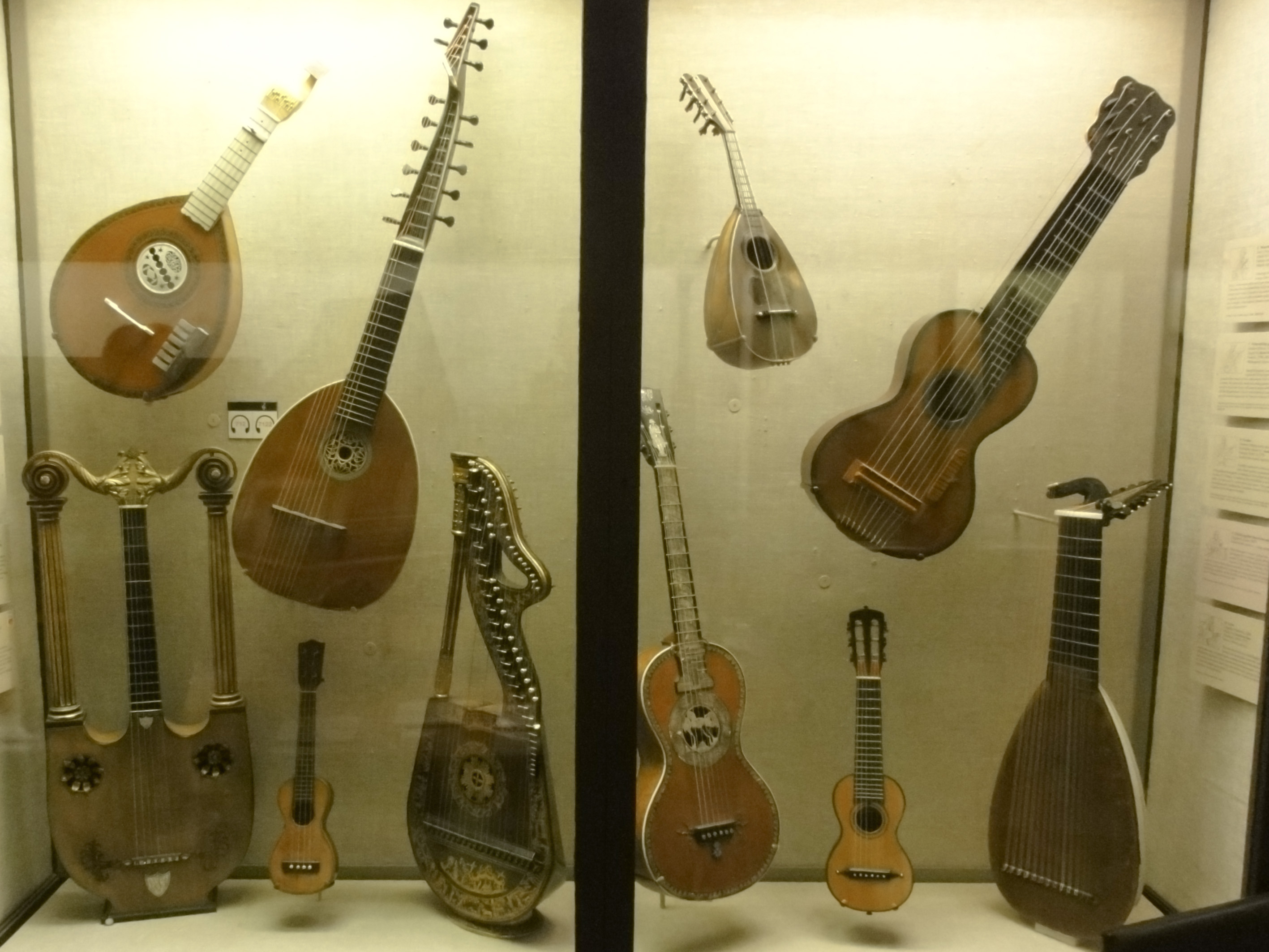
1827 Lacôte 9-string guitar (top-right)

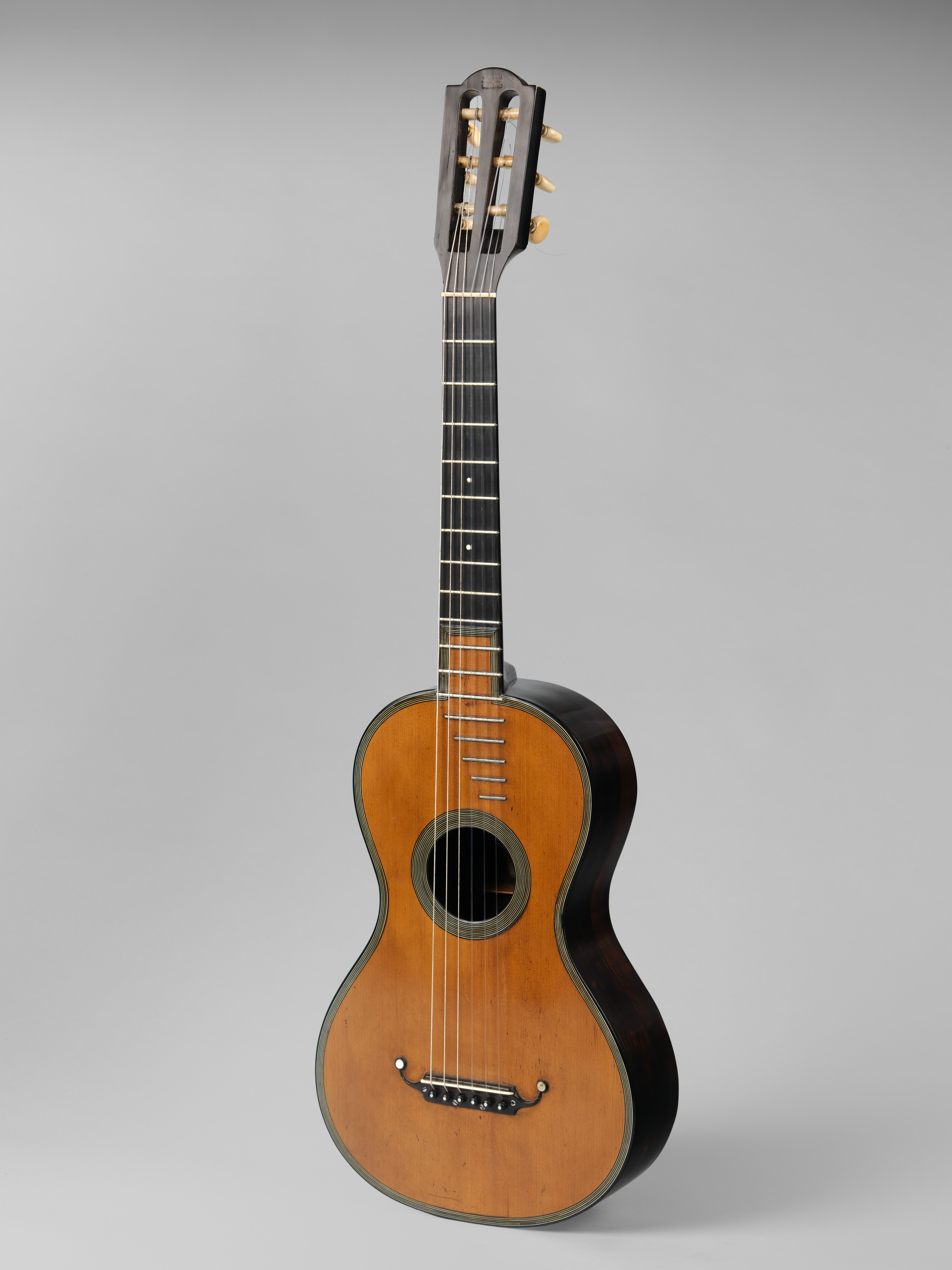
Lacôte guitar ca. 1835

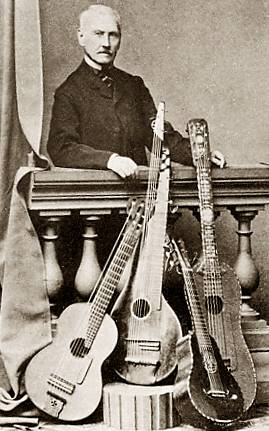
Napoléon Coste with a Lacôte Heptacorde (left)

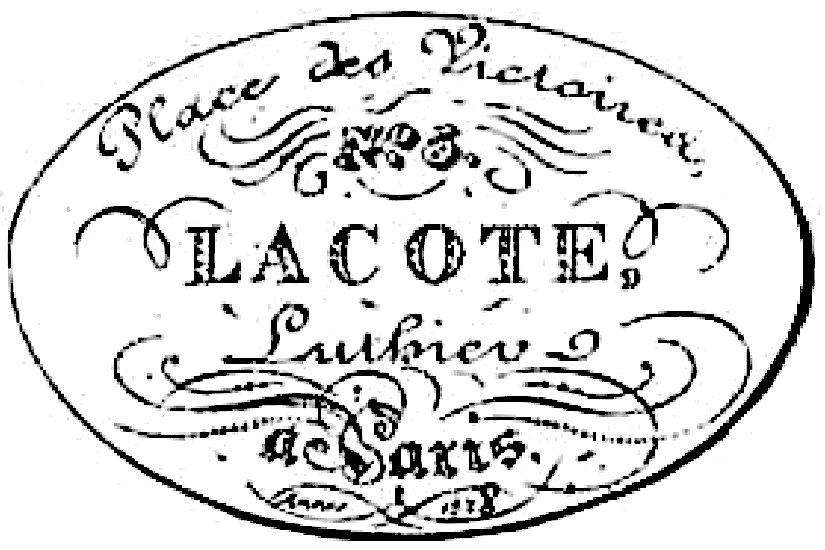
1828 Lacôte guitar label

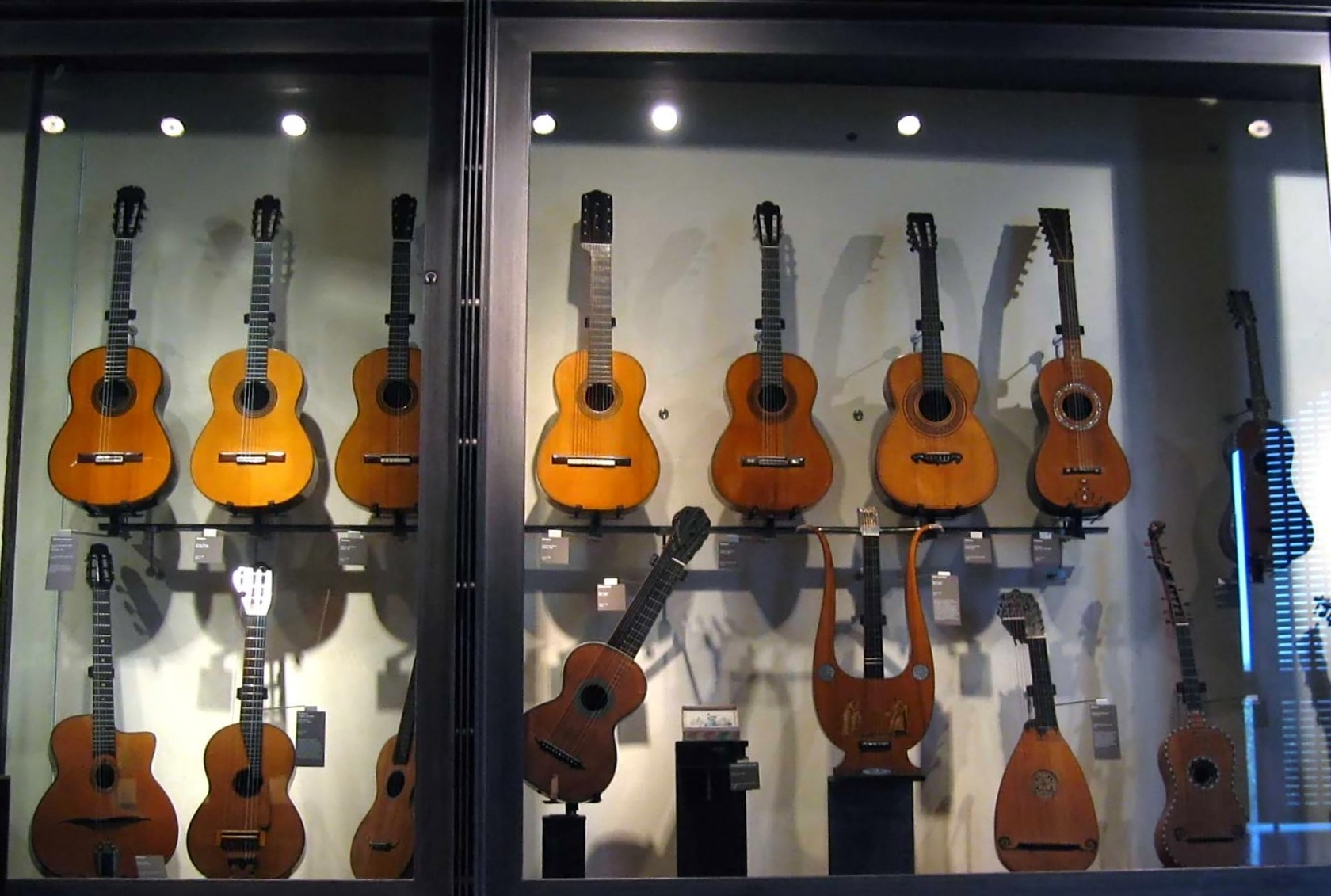
Three Lacôte guitars (bottom row, 2nd, 3rd, and 4th guitars)

1826 Lacôte "guitar decacorde" (ten-string guitar) at St Cecilia's Hall, Edinburgh
