= Giulio Regondi =

Italian composer

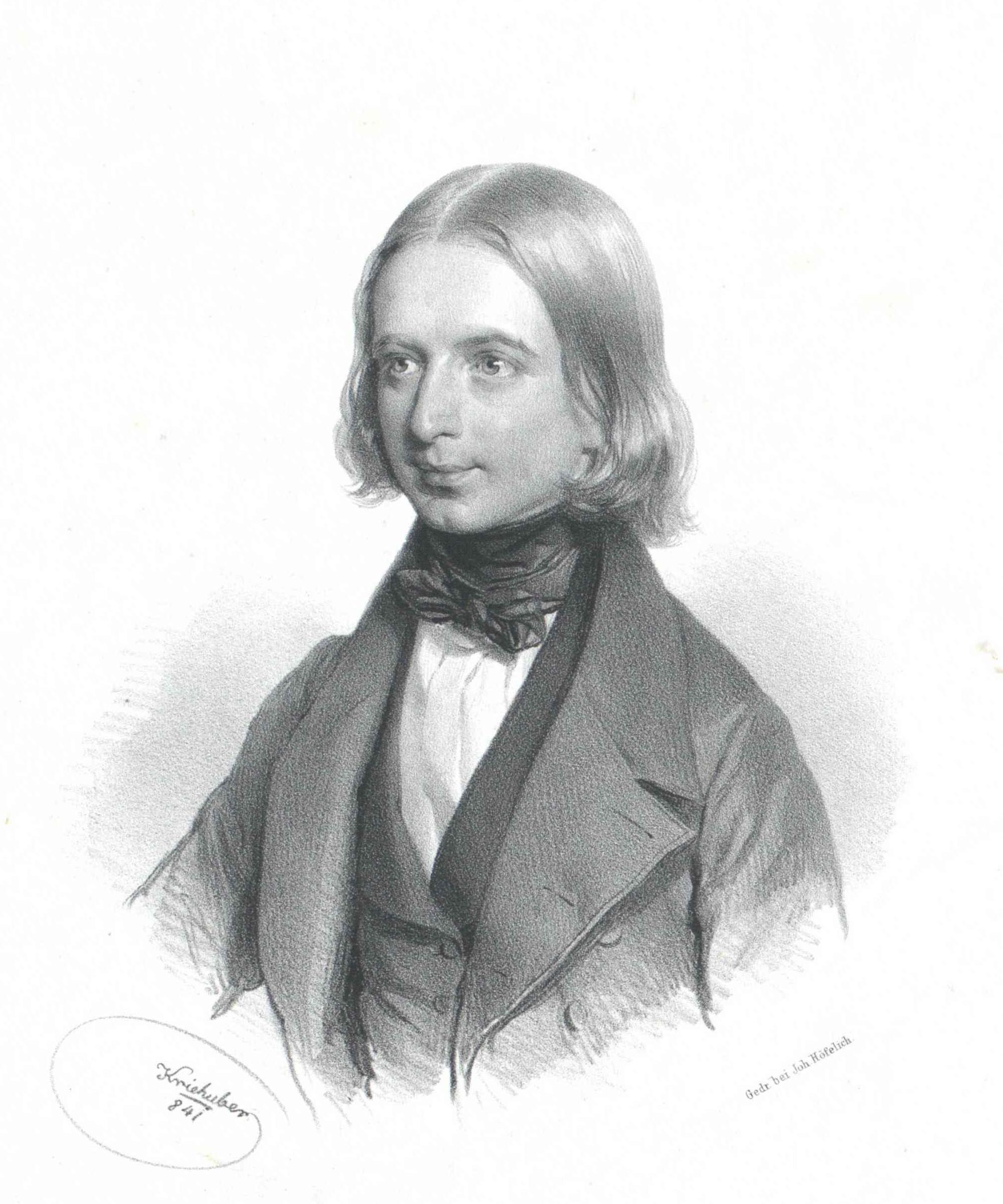
Giulio Regondi Lithograph by Josef Kriehuber, 1841.

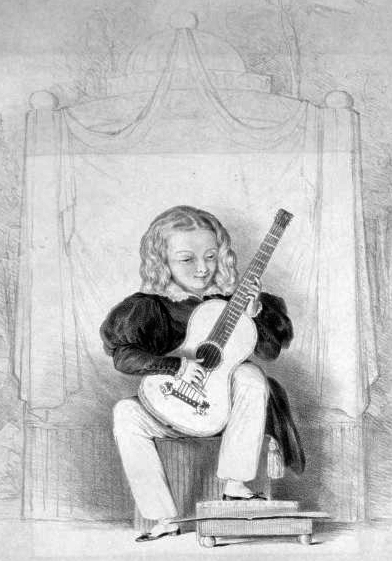
Young Giulio performing at the Royal Adelphi Theatre in London on 3 September 1831

Giulio Regondi (1822 – 6 May 1872) was a Swiss-born classical guitarist, concertinist and composer active in France and (mainly) the United Kingdom.

Regondi was born of a German mother and an Italian father in Geneva, Switzerland. In 1831 Fernando Sor dedicated his Souvenir d'amitié op. 46 to Regondi, a child prodigy, when the boy was just nine.

There is a reference to his appearing in London in 1831, presented as a child prodigy of the guitar. All of Regondi's concertina music was written for the English system, at which he was a virtuoso, though his guitar music is now better known. Regondi's works for solo guitar comprise a set of etudes, variations on a theme by Bellini and five larger works.

Regondi died in London.

== Selected works ==
- Nocturne 'Rêverie' op. 19, for guitar
- Fête villageoise 'Rondo caprice' op. 20, for guitar
- Air varié No. 1 op. 21, for guitar
- Air varié No. 2 op. 22, for guitar
- Introduction et caprice op. 23, for guitar
- Ten Études, for guitar
- Feuillet d'album for guitar
- Fantasie über Mozarts Don Giovanni (Solo on Don Giovanni, partly from Thalberg's piece) for guitar (1840) rediscovered in 2007
- Air varié de l’opera de Bellini I Capuleti e i Montecchi for guitar (1845) rediscovered in 2007
- Concerto in D, for concertina, published with piano accompaniment (1855)
- Concerto in Eb, for concertina, never published but survives in manuscript with piano accompaniment
- Fantasia on English Airs, for concertina and piano
- Leisure Moments (1-6), for concertina and piano (1857)
- Leisure Moments (7-12), for concertina and piano
- Morceau de salon, for concertina and piano
- Les oiseaux; Morceau de concert, for concertina and piano
- Serenade in A major, for concertina and piano
- Recollections of Home, for concertina
- Ecco ridente il cielo, for concertina
- Hexameron du concertiniste; Six Études, for concertina
- Three Waltzes, for concertina
- Remembrance, for baritone concertina
- Souvenir d'amitié, for baritone concertina
