= Francesco Molino =

Italian composer

Francesco Molino (also known as François Molino; 4 June 1768 – 1847) was an Italian guitarist, violinist, and composer.

== Biography ==
Molino was born in Ivrea near Turin. He often travelled to Spain to give concerts. He was orchestral conductor during 1796–97. In 1820 he settled in Paris, where he lived for the remainder of his life.

His works were largely neglected until the twentieth century, when many of them were republished. Among the best-known are his Three Sonatas, 18 Preludes and Terpsichore (a set of dances), all for solo guitar. He also wrote for other instruments in combination with the guitar, including flute and violin. In 1830 he published a guitar method.

== Works ==
Francesco Molino composed more than 60 works.

=== Guitar ===
- Opus 1: Trois sonates faciles
- Opus 5: Six thèmes avec variations
- Opus 6: Trois sonates pour la guitare (Three Sonates)
  - Sonata No.1 in D major
  - Sonata No.2 in G major
  - Sonata No.3 in C major
- Opus 9: 12 Waltzes
- Opus 9: 12 Variations on "Ah! Vous dirai-je maman"
- Opus 11: 6 Rondos
- Opus 13: 2 Fantaisies
- Opus 13: 3 Rondos
- Opus 15: Trois sonates
- Opus 17: Grande Ouverture
- Opus 18: 4 Theme and variations
- Opus 28: Trois Rondeaux brillants d'une exécution facile
- Opus 31: Variations
- Opus 34: Grand polonaise and 2 rondos
- Opus 41: Brilliant variations
- Opus 51: Grand sonata
- Opus 58: Variations on a Scottish air
- 18 Preludes
- Romance
- Sonatina

=== Violin ===
- Opus 68: Sonate

=== Guitar duo ===
- Opus 47: Grande Potpourri on themes of Rossini

=== Violin (or flute) and guitar ===
- Opus 2: 3 Sonatas
- Opus 3: 3 Duets
- Opus 7: Trois grande sonates
- Opus 16: 3 Duets
- Opus 22: Trois grande sonates
- Opus 29: Trois grande sonates
- Opus 37: Nocturne No. 1
- Opus 38: Nocturne No. 2
- Opus 39: Nocturne No. 3
- Opus 61: 3 Duets

=== Guitar and Piano ===
- Opus 36: Nocturne No. 1
- Opus 44: Nocturne No. 2
- Opus 57: Nocturne No. 3

=== Trio ===
- Opus 4: Trois Trios, for flute, viola, and guitar
- Opus 19: Trois Trios, for flute, viola, and guitar
- Opus 30: Grand trio concertant, for flute or violin, viola, and guitar
- Opus 35: Second grand trio concertant, for flute or violin, viola, and guitar
- Opus 45: Grand trio, for flute, viola, and guitar

=== Concertos ===
- Violin concerto No. 1
- Opus 25: Violin concerto No, 2 (dedicated to Kreutzer)
- Opus 56: Guitar concerto

=== Method ===
- Opus 24: Méthode
- Opus 33: Méthode
- Opus 46: Grande méthode complette pour la guitare (Paris, 1830) (OCLC: 54138738)

== Bibliography ==
- Otto Torp: Instruction Book for the Spanish Guitar, selected from the works of F. Carulli, F. Molino & M. Giuliani (New York, E. Riley [1829]) OCLC: 28429118
- Giovanni Del Lago, Giovanni Spataro: Lettere di diversi autori che trattano di musica (Austrian National Library, music collection (unpublished dissertation), OCLC: 12327433
- Jan W. J. Burgers: Francesco Molino (1768–1847), Guitarist and Violinist. Life and Works (Aarhus: Bergmann Edition, 2021); ISBN 978-87-980291-0-6.
- Grande Potpourri über Themen von Rossini Op. 47 - Urtext Edition - Edited by Carmelo Imbesi e Carmen Zangarà ( Duo Imbesi Zangarà ) - Num Cat. BE – 240605 | ISMN 979-0-706838-32-8, Bergmann Edition, 2024
