= Antoine de Lhoyer =

French virtuoso classical guitarist and composer (1768-1852)

Antoine de Lhoyer [L'Hoyer] (6 September 1768 – 15 March 1852) was a French virtuoso classical guitarist and an eminent early romantic composer of mainly chamber music featuring the classical guitar. Lhoyer also had a notable military career; he was an elite member of the Gardes du Corps du Roi, a Knight of the Order of St John and a Knight of the Order of St Louis. His music fell into obscurity even before his impoverished death at the age of 83 in Paris.

Musicological research has revived interest in his music, resulting in some modern recordings and additions to the repertoire for the classical guitar (especially enriching the number and quality of guitar duets).

== Biography ==
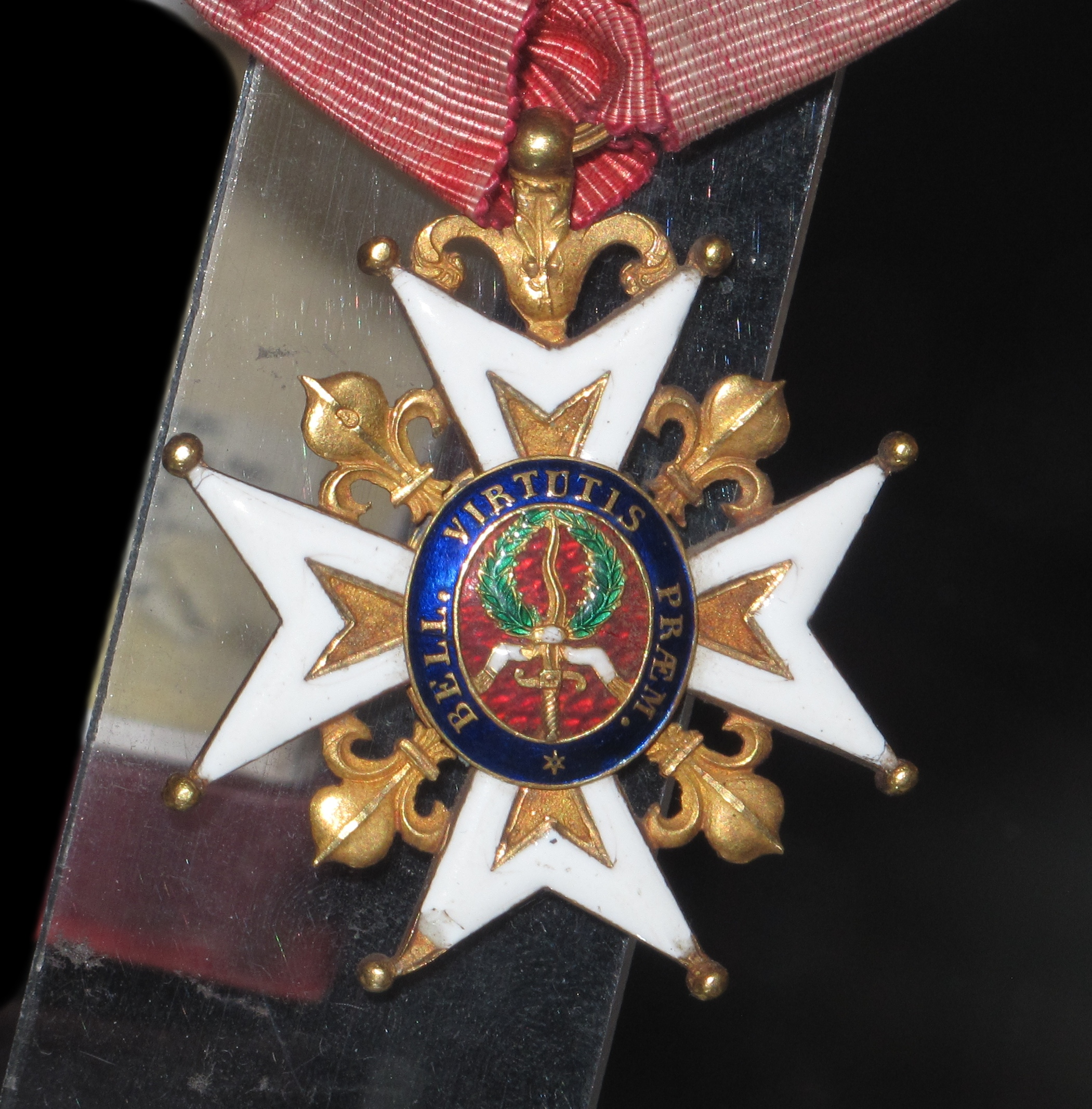
L'Hoyer was knighted (29 June 1814) into the Order of Saint Louis

Antoine de Lhoyer was born on 6 September 1768 in the French commune of Clermont-Ferrand. He was a member of a wealthy bourgeois family. From an early age he was well educated in music, learning to play at first the harpsichord, then the five-string guitar. An early teacher may have been Pierre Jean Porro, a music teacher at the Royal Military School of Effiat, near Clermont. De Lhoyer moved to Paris in 1774. To further his musical education, he visited major European capitals, and by the age of 21 already enjoyed a reputation as a virtuoso guitarist.

The rest of Lhoyer's life was to be buffeted by the momentous events of the French Revolution. A devout royalist, in 1789 he became a soldier in the Gardes du Corps du Roi, the bodyguard to Louis XVI. He fled from France after the massacre of guards by the crowd that invaded Versailles on 6 October 1789. By 1792, in Koblenz he had enlisted with the armée des Princes which joined with an allied army of Prussian and Austrian soldiers led by the Duke of Brunswick in an unsuccessful invasion of France in 1792. The years 1794-7 saw him participating in the campaigns with the Austrian army, and in 1799–1800 he served with counter revolutionary forces in the Army of Condé. He was wounded in battle and lost the use of his right hand for three years. He took refuge in Hamburg between 1800 and 1804 where his first known musical works were published (opus 12 to 18).

He next travelled to St Petersburg where he was well received by the royal court, obtaining employment as a guitar teacher to the Tsarina and becoming a favourite of the Empress Elizabeth. He spent a productive ten years in Russia, arranging Russian folk songs for the guitar and publishing solo and ensemble guitar works as well as several collections of Romances for voice and guitar (opus 18b to 26).

He returned to France after the fall of Napoleon to rejoin the forces of the King. Eventually, in 1814, he became a sergeant in the elite Garde de la Manche du Roi after the Bourbon Restoration. Around this time he published his first works for six-string guitar, the Duos concertants, Op. 31 and 32.

Louis XVIII appointed him "Major de la place" on the Île d’Oléron in 1816. Between 1820 and 1825, he established his home in nearby Niort where he married and had four children. From this time he published his opus numbers 38 to 45. He became Lieutenant du Roi (a vice regal appointment) at Saint Florent in Corsica from 1826.

Possibly due to the decline in popularity of the guitar in salon music, replaced by the increasingly popular pianoforte, no more music of Lhoyer appears to have been published from this time (1826) onward. In 1830 he became "Commandant de la place" in Bonifacio, Corsica. His life took another change in fortune with the abdication of the French King in the July Revolution of 1830 and the subsequent reorganisation of civil and military administration, losing his position as commandant.

In 1831, he established his home in Aix-en-Provence staying there until 1836. Next he took his family to Algeria settling near the capital Algiers and then finally in 1852 to Paris where he died in poverty on 15 March during the reign of Napoleon III.

== Works ==
Lhoyer left about 40 or 50 works for both the five-string and six-string guitar, mainly in the form of duets, trios and other chamber music ensembles featuring the classical guitar. Lhoyer left only a few solo works for the guitar. The places of publication of his works correspond to his travels. Opus numbers 1 to 11 have not yet been identified.

== List of compositions ==
=== Hamburg (Op. 12–18) ===
- Grande sonate, Op. 12
- Six Romances, Op. 14
- Romances, Op. 15, for soprano and guitar
- Guitar Concerto, Op. 16 (modern edition, Madrid 1964)
- Trois Sonates (with violin obligato), Op. 17
- Ouverture, Op. 18, for violin and guitar

=== St Petersburg (Op. 19–27) ===
- Air Russe varié
- Six Romances nouvelles, Op. 20
- 12 Valses, Op. 23
- 12 Romances nouvelles, Op. 24, for soprano and guitar
- Six Exercices, Op. 27

=== Paris (Op. 28–45) ===
- Grand Duo Concertant, Op. 28, for violin and guitar
- Trio, Op. 29, for three guitars
- Trois Duos concertants dédiés à Madame la Princesse de Croy Solré, Op. 31 (1814)
- Air varié et dialogué, for guitar quartet (c.1815)
- 12 Waltzes, Op. 32 for two guitars
- Fantaisie concertante, Op. 33
- Trois Duos concertants, Op. 34 (1819)
- Six Duos concertants, Op. 35
- Six Sérénades faciles, Op. 36
- Six Duos nocturnes, Op. 37
- Trios, Op. 38 and 39, for violin, viola and guitar
- The Magic Flute, Op. 40, transcription for violin, viola and guitar
- Grand Trio, Op. 41, for flute, viola and guitar
- Trio nº 2 in C, Op. 42, for guitar trio
- Air varié – Fantaisie – Divertissement suivi d'un air écossais, Op. 43
- Duo concertant, Op. 44
- Grand duo, Op. 45, for violin and guitar

=== Without opus numbers ===
- Les Soupers de Momus. Recueil de chansons et de poésies fugitives, avec musique et accompagnemens de guitare par MM. F. Carulli et A. Lhoyer. ("The Dinner of Momus", a collection of songs and poems with guitar accompaniment by F. Carulli et A. Lhoyer.)
- Five works titled Air varié; one in C, published 1828, one set for 4 guitars
- 6 exercices pour apprendre la guitar à fond
- Trois chansons russes de l'opera 'La Nymph du Dnépr pour la guitare
- Variations on 'God save the King' and a Russian air
- Fantaisie pour guitare seule
- Divertissement pour la guitare, composé de diverses pièces et suivi de variations sur l'air écossais de la Dame blanche

== Bibliography ==
- Ophee, Matanya: "Antoine de L'Hoyer: A Detective Story and Check List of his Works", in: Soundboard vol. 17 (1990) no. 3
- Stenstadvold, Erik (ed.): Antoine de Lhoyer: The Complete Guitar Duos by Antoine de Lhoyer (Heidelberg: Chanterelle, 2007)
- Faure, Philippe (2004). "Antoine de Lhoyer". Archived from the original on 14 November 2008.

== Sheetmusic ==
- (in Swedish) muslib.se
- (in Danish) Rischel & Birket-Smith's Collection of guitar music Det Kongelige Bibliotek, Denmark
- Musikabteilung der Bayerischen Staatsbibliothek images
