= Napoléon Coste =

French classical guitarist and composer

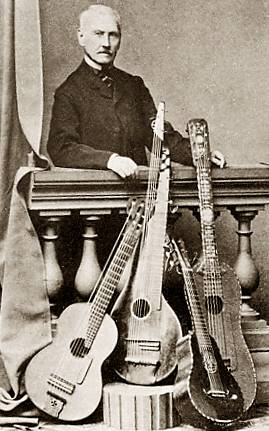
Napoléon Coste (1805–1883) with one of his Lacôte "floating 7th string" guitars, an 18th-century arch-cittern, a French 19th century cittern, and a custom extra-large guitar.

Claude Antoine Jean Georges Napoléon Coste (27 June 1805 – 14 January 1883) was a French classical guitarist and composer.

== Biography ==
Napoléon Coste was born in Amondans (Doubs), near Besançon, France. He was first taught the guitar by his mother, an accomplished player. As a teenager he became a teacher of the instrument and appeared in three concerts in the Franche-Comté. In 1829, at the age of 24, he moved to Paris where he studied under Fernando Sor and quickly established himself as the leading French virtuoso guitarist.

Despite declining demand in Paris for guitarists during the years after he arrived, Coste achieved financial stability as a professional musician and composer. Unable to find a publisher, he had to self-publish his works. Napoléon Coste was influenced by the Early Classical-Romantic composers of the time including Hector Berlioz. Coste's Opus no.47, La Source du Lyson is inspired by nature much like Berlioz's program music.

Coste injured his left shoulder in 1863, though was able to continue public performances until 1881, two years before his death. After Sor's death, Coste edited and republished Sor's original method for guitar as Méthode complète pour la Guitare par Ferdinand Sor, rédigée et augmentée de nombreux exemples et leçons par N. Coste (translated, the title is "Complete Method for Guitar by Ferdinand Sor, Refingered and Expanded with numerous Examples and Lessons by N. Coste").

Coste was a member of the masonic lodge Les Frères Unis Inséparables.

Coste had a special fondness for playing the seven string guitar. He was famous for his unique seven string guitar with a “floating” 7th string typically tuned to D or C called the Lacôte Heptachord. Tonally this invention created more depth when played as the floating string would vibrate sympathetically even as the other strings were plucked.

He is known as one of the first composers to transcribe guitar music of the 17th century into modern musical notation. He died at age 77, leaving a significant catalogue of original compositions.

== List of works ==
=== Works published with opus numbers ===
- Op. 2: Variations et Finale... sur un motif favori de la Famille Suisse de Weigl ("Variations and Finale ... on a favorite theme of the Swiss Family Weigl")
- Op. 3: 2 Quadrilles de contredanses ("2 Contredance Quadrilles")
- Op. 4: Fantasie ... composée sur un motif du 'Ballet d'Armide' ("Fantasy ... Composed on a Theme from Armida's Ball")
- Op. 5: Souvenirs de Flandres ("Memories of Flanders")
- Op. 6: Fantaisie de concert ("Fantasy Concert")
- Op. 7: 16 Valses favorites de Johann Strauss ("16 Waltz Favorites by Johann Strauss")
- Op. 9: Divertissement sur 'Lucia di Lammermoor' ("Divertissement on [the opera] Lucia di Lammermoor")
- Op. 10: Scherzo et pastorale (for two guitars)
- Op. 11: Grand caprice
- Op. 12: Rondeau de concert
- Op. 13: Caprice sur … La Cachucha
- Op. 14: Deuxième Polonaise ("Second Polonaise")
- Op. 15: Le Tournoi fantaisie chevaleresque ("The Fantasy Chivalry Tournament")
- Op. 16: Fantaisie sur deux motifs de la 'Norma' ("Fantasy on Themes from [the opera] Norma")
- Op. 17: La Vallée d'Ornans ("The Ornans Valley")
- Op. 18: Les Bords du Rhin ("The Banks of the Rhine")
- Op. 19: Delfzil
- Op. 19b: La Romanesca
- Op. 20: Le Zuyderzée ("The Zuyderzee")
- Op. 21: Les Cloches ("The Bells")
- Op. 22: Meulan
- Op. 23: Les Soirées d'Auteuil ("Evenings in Auteuil")
- Op. 24: Grand solo
- Op. 25: Romance pour hautbois et piano
- Op. 27: Le Passage des Alpes ("The Trail in the Alps")
- Op. 28b: Fantaisie symphonique ("Symphonic Fantasy")
- Op. 29: La Chasse des sylphes ("The Hunt of the Sylphes")
- Op. 30: Grande sérénade
- Op. 31: Le Départ, fantaisie dramatique ("The Departure, Dramatic Fantasy")
- Op. 33: Mazurka
- Op. 34: Le Montagnard Divertissement Pastoral pour Hautbois ou Violon et Piano ou Guitare
- Op. 36: Cantilène pour hautbois et piano
- Op. 37: Cavatine pour hautbois et piano
- Op. 38: 25 Études de genre ("25 Typical Études")
- Op. 39: Andante et menuet
- Op. 41: Feuilles d'automne ("Autumn Leaves")
- Op. 42: La Ronde de Mai ("May Rondo")
- Op. 43: Marche funèbre et rondeau ("Funeral March and Rondo")
- Op. 44: Andante et polonaise (Souvenirs du Jura) ("Memories of Jura")
- Op. 45: Divagation ("Wandering")
- Op. 46 Valse Favorite ("Favorite Waltz")
- Op. 47: La Source du Lyson ("The Lyson River Spring")
- Op. 48: Quatre Marches
- Op. 49: Six Préludes
- Op. 50: Adagio et divertissements
- Op. 51: Récréation du Guitariste ("The Guitarist's Break").
- Op. 52: Le Livre d'or du guitariste ("The Guitarist's Golden Book").
- Op. 53: Six Pièces originales (Rêverie, Rondeau, 2 Menuets, Scherzo, Étude)

=== Works without opus numbers ===
- Méditation de nuit ("Night Meditation")
- Andante et allegro
- Divertissement
- Introduction et variations sur un motif de Rossini ("Introduction and Variations on a Theme by Rossini")
- Berceuse ("Lullaby")
- Kleines Tonstück
- Pastorale
- Valse en ré majeur ("Waltz in D major")
- Valse en la majeur ("Waltz in A major")
- Valse des roses ("Waltz of the Roses")
- Duetto

== Sources ==
=== Instruments ===
- Photos of Coste's guitar made by René Lacote (Museum Cité de la Musique in Paris)
- The Lacôte Heptacorde by Gregg Miner (www.harpguitars.net)
- Lacôte / Coste Heptacorde by Bernhard Kresse (www.harpguitars.net)
- Nine-string guitar, 1827 by René Lacôte (belonged to Eugène Peletin of Paris, a student of Napoleon Coste. It was part of Coste's collection.)
- The Lacôte-Coste guitar by Bruno Marlat (see page 6, ref)

=== Sheet music ===
- Rischel & Birket-Smith's Collection of guitar music 1 Det Kongelige Bibliotek, Denmark
- Boije Collection The Music Library of Sweden
- Free scores by Napoléon Coste at the International Music Score Library Project (IMSLP)
- Free scores at the Mutopia Project

== Bibliography ==
- Noël Roncet: Napoleon Coste, Composer, 1805-1883 (London: Tecla Editions, 2008)
- Ari van Vliet: Napoléon Coste: Composer and Guitarist in the Musical Life of 19th-Century Paris (Zwolle: Cumuli Foundation, 2015)
- Ingrid & Werner Holzschuh (editors): Napoleon Coste. Späte Briefe, 1867-1882 (Hamburg: Trekel, 2016)
- Carmelo Imbesi, Carmen Zangarà, Récréation du Guitariste Op.51, Napoléon Coste, Edizione Urtext,, Num Cat. JKMED 2507, ISBN 9798275203899, JK Mertz Edition, 2025
