= Dionisio Aguado y García =

Spanish classical guitarist and composer

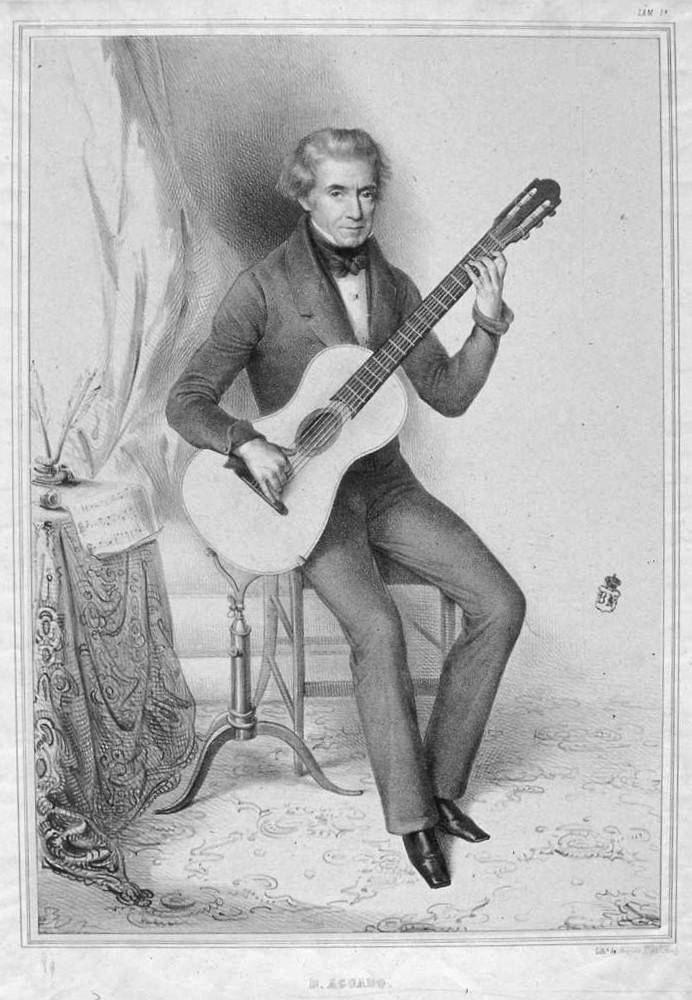
Lithograph of Dionisio Aguado y García by J.A. López

Dionisio Aguado y García (8 April 1784 – 29 December 1849) was a Spanish classical guitarist and composer of the late Classical and early Romantic periods.

== Biography ==
Born in Madrid, he studied with Miguel García. In 1826, Aguado visited Paris, where he met and became friends with and for a while lived with Fernando Sor. Sor's duo Les Deux Amis ("The Two Friends") commemorated the friendship: one part is marked "Sor" and the other "Aguado."

Aguado's major work Nuevo Metodo Para Guitarra was a guitar tutorial published in 1843. As of 2011, it is still in print, with Tecla Editions releasing a reprint in 2005. In the Nuevo Metodo Aguado describes his use of fingernails on the right hand as well as his invention of a "tripodison": a device that held the guitar and thus minimized the damping effect of the player's body on the guitar's back and sides. Aguado's other works include numerous waltzes, minuets, and other light pieces. The more extended works require a virtuoso technique and left-hand stretches that are almost impossible on the longer string lengths of modern guitars. (See Frederick Noad, "The Classical Guitar")

Aguado returned home to Madrid in 1837 and died there aged 65.

Aguado's surname comes from the Spanish word for "soaked." (This is because an ancient relative of his, who was a knight, returned after a battle caked in mud. The nickname then eventually became the surname.)

== Instruments used by Aguado y García ==
Of the instruments used by Aguado, two which were built by

- Pierre René Lacôte, (Paris 1838) and
- Etienne Laprevotte, (Paris 1838)

are held at the Museo Arqueológico Nacional in Madrid. Aguado is known for having used a tripod to support his guitar.

== List of works ==
Six Petites Pieces, No. 1 by Dionisio Aguado
Six Petites Pieces, No. 1 by Dionisio Aguado

Six Petites Pieces, No. 2 by Dionisio Aguado
Six Petites Pieces, No. 2 by Dionisio Aguado

Six Petites Pieces, No. 3 by Dionisio Aguado
Six Petites Pieces, No. 3 by Dionisio Aguado

Six Petites Pieces, No. 4 by Dionisio Aguado
Six Petites Pieces, No. 4 by Dionisio Aguado

Six Petites Pieces, No. 5 by Dionisio Aguado
Six Petites Pieces, No. 5 by Dionisio Aguado

Six Petites Pieces, No. 6 by Dionisio Aguado
Six Petites Pieces, No. 6 by Dionisio Aguado

- Op. 1 : Douze Valses
- Op. 2 : Trois Rondo Brillants
- Op. 3 : Huit Petites Pièces
- Op. 4 : Six Petites Pièces
- Op. 5 : Quatre Andantes et Quatre Valses
- Op. 6 : Nouvelle Méthode de Guitare (1834)
- Op. 7 : Valses Faciles
- Op. 8 : Contredanses et Valses Faciles
- Op. 9 : Contredanses non difficiles
- Op. 10 : Exercices Faciles et Très Utiles
- Op. 11 : Les Favorites - Huit Contredanses
- Op. 12 : Six Menuets & Six Valses
- Op. 13 : Morceaux Agréables non difficiles
- Op. 14 : Dix Petites Pièces non difficiles
- Op. 15 : Le Menuet Affandangado
- Op. 16 : Le Fandango Varié

Works without Opus number:

- Allegro
- Coleccion De Andantes, Valses Y Minuetos
- Douze Walses, Une Marche Militaire, Et Un Theme Varie
- Escuela de Guitarra (1825)
- Gran Solo (Fernando Sor's Op.14, Arr. by Aguado)
- Muestra De Afecto Y Reconocimiento (Seis Valses)
- Valses Characteristiques
- Variaciones
- Variaciones Brillantes
- Mazurka (Polish national song, Arr. by Dionisio Aguado)
- Adante by Dionisio Aguado
- Introducción y rondó

== Album ==
- Duo Imbesi Zangarà, Tocando en Dos works by Julian Arcas, Francisco Tarrega, Dionisio Aguado, performed by Carmelo Imbesi e Carmen Zangarà, Classical Music 3.0, 2022
