= Fernando Sor =

Spanish classical guitarist and composer (1778–1839)

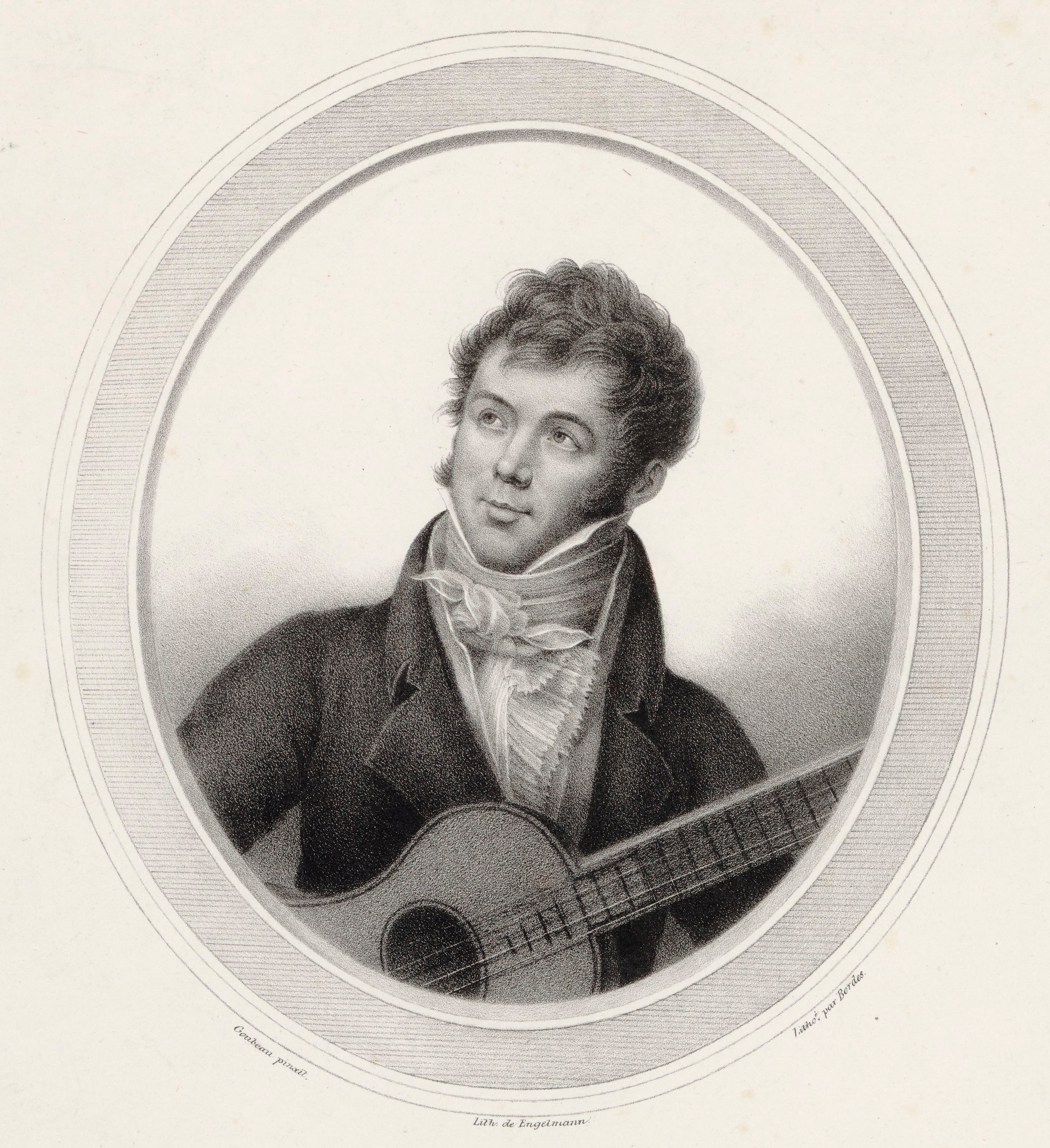
- A lithographed painting of Fernando Sor, c. 1825
- Born: José Fernando Macario Sors; Barcelona
- Baptized: 14 February 1778
- Died: 10 July 1839 (aged 61); Paris
- Occupations: Composer, classical guitarist

Op. 11 No. 2
The second piece from Twelve Minuets, Op. 11, early 19th century (3:08)

Op. 31 No. 1
The first piece from Sor's 24 Progressive Lessons For Beginners, Op. 31, c. 1828 (1:21)

Op. 35 No. 17
Performed in 2009, this is from Sor's 24 Exercises composed c. 1828 (2:06)

Fernando Sor (baptised 14 February 1778 – 10 July 1839) was a Spanish classical guitarist and composer of the late Classical era and early Romantic era. Best known for writing solo classical guitar music, he also composed an opera (at the age of 19), three symphonies, guitar duos, piano music, songs, a Mass, and at least two successful ballets: Cinderella, which received over one hundred performances, and Hercule et Omphale.

Partly because Sor was himself such a classical guitar virtuoso—contemporaries considered him to be the best in the world—he made a point of writing didactic music for players of that instrument of all levels. His Twelve Studies Op. 6, the Twelve Studies Op. 29, the (24) Progressive Lessons Op. 31, and the (24) Very Easy Exercises Op. 35 have been widely played for two hundred years and are regularly reprinted. On the other hand, Sor's concert pieces, like the popular Introduction and Variations on Mozart's "Das klinget so herrlich" Op. 9, belong to the advanced guitar performance repertoire.

Unlike modern classical guitar players, Sor used the smaller, slimmer "Romantic" guitars predating today's familiar guitar standards set by Torres. He used the ring finger of his plucking hand "rarely" and "only for harmony (never for melody)." He eschewed the use of nails on that hand.

== Variance of name ==
As Sor's works were published in various countries, his name was translated, leading to variances in its spelling. These included Joseph Fernando Macario Sors, Ferdinand Sor, Ferdinando Sor and, in the last years, Ferran Sor. His family name appears in various forms in other contemporary documents as well, and there is not always a record of his having approved or used them. But in the file and marriage certificate of his grandfather, which includes Fernando's great-grandfathers, the name always appears as Sor, and this is true too of the corresponding document for one of the great-grandfathers, the oldest document yet found.

== Biography ==
=== Spain ===
Born in Barcelona to a fairly well-off family, he was baptized as José Fernando Macario Sors, as recorded in the baptismal record, although in most of his manuscript and printed musical works he appears as Fernando Sor or Ferdinand Sor, and only in some cases does his surname appear as Sors.

Sor was descended from a long line of career soldiers and intended to continue that legacy, but was distracted from this when his father introduced him to Italian opera. He fell in love with music and abandoned his military ambitions. Along with opera, Sor's father also introduced him to the guitar.

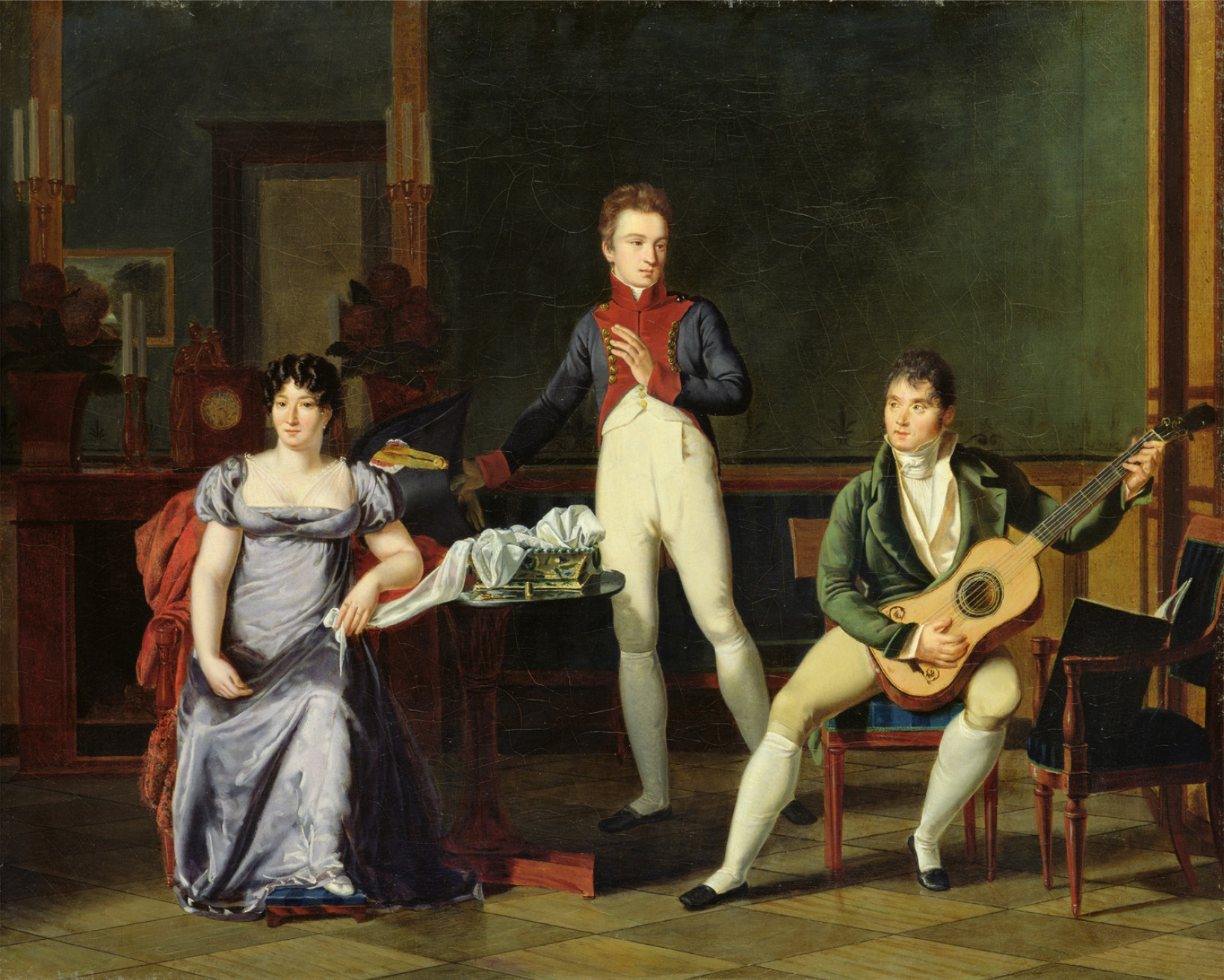
Musician and his Family, French oil painting (Bibliothèque Marmottan, Boulogne-Billancourt, Paris)

At a young age, Sor's parents wouldn't give his musical abilities too much special attention, for fear it would distract from his Latin studies. Therefore, the young Sor (still not 11 years old) began to write songs to words in Latin to impress his parents. He even invented his own system for notating music, as he had not yet received formal training.

When he reached the age of 11 or 12, the head of the Barcelona Cathedral took notice of young Sor's talent, and he was enrolled in the school there. Not long after, his father died, leaving his mother without the funds to continue his education at the Cathedral. However, at around the same time Joseph Arredondo, the new abbot of Santa Maria de Montserrat, the famous monastery, heard of his talent, and provided funds for him to attend the choir school located at the monastery. Sor reveals in writings, mainly from the last ten years of his life, that he was greatly attached to this place, and had fond, nostalgic memories of his childhood there. But his mother began to see that Sor was becoming greatly distracted from his "chosen" path in the military or administration and, following the advice of friends, took him out of the monastery and placed him in military school for four years. It was not a terrible turn of events, as he had much free time to play and compose music in the army as well.

In 1808, when Napoleon Bonaparte invaded Spain, Sor began to write nationalistic music for the guitar, often accompanied by patriotic lyrics. Sor was even part of traveling military bands that would play protest music on the streets. He was also promoted to captain in Córdoba and may have fought battles against the French at this time. After the defeat of the Spanish army, however, Sor accepted an administrative post in the occupying government. Here he was to be officially labeled an afrancesado along with the other Spaniards who abandoned their defense of Spain to embrace the French Revolutionary ideas. After the Spanish repelled the French in 1813, Sor and other afrancesados left Spain for fear of retribution. He went to Paris, never to return to his home country again.

=== Paris, London, and Moscow ===
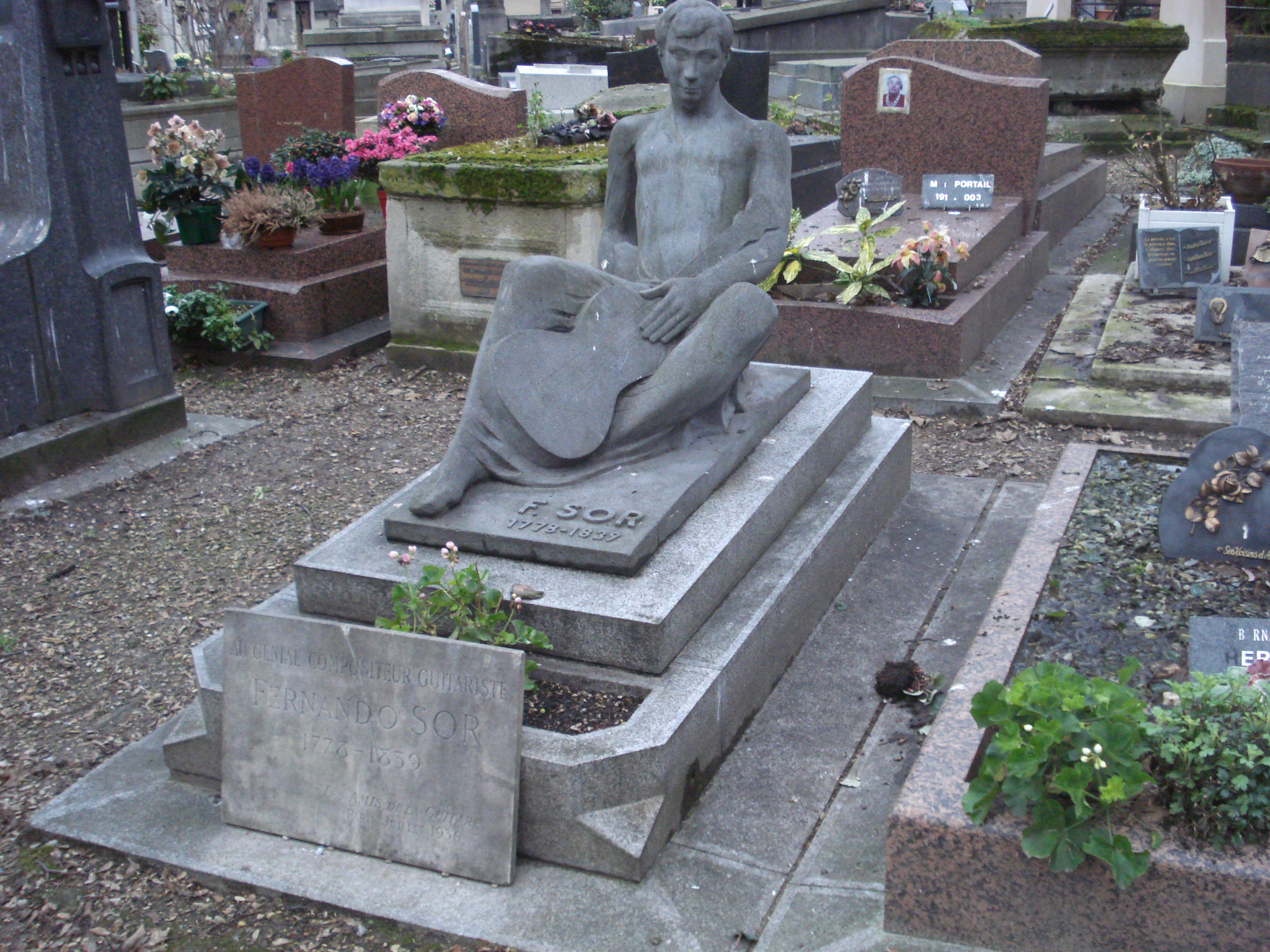
Montmartre Cemetery, Paris

Having abandoned his family's ideal of a military or administrative post, Sor could finally give music a serious try in France. He gained renown at first as a virtuoso guitarist and composer for the instrument. When he attempted composing operas, however, he was rejected by the French. His Op. 7 was a large and strange piece, notated in three clefs, and no guitarist at the time could play it. Since France was no longer supportive of his music, Sor decided to try his talents elsewhere.

In 1815, he went to London to attempt to build a stronger music career there. Again, he gained considerable fame as a classical guitarist and gave guitar and voice lessons. Since ballet in London was more popular than opera, Sor decided to try his hand at this new genre of music. He had considerable success this time, especially with his ballet Cendrillon.

By 1823, once he had acquired a level of fame in London, Sor again wandered away, this time with his wife, the ballerina Félicité Hullin, to Moscow in her quest to become a prima ballerina. Not much is known about his time there, however, despite the exaggeration about his romantic and professional life. After three years in Moscow, he traveled around Europe giving concerts and getting into music circles everywhere he went.

In 1827, partly due to his advancing age, he settled down and decided to live out the rest of his life back in Paris. It was during this retirement that he composed the majority of his classical guitar works. He had to comply with the demands of the public, though, and most guitarists wanted technically simple, nice-sounding pieces. It was in these last ten or so years of his life that his writings reveal his bitterness towards how his publications were being received by the public. For example, Op. 43 is entitled Mes Ennuis ("My Annoyances"), and six of his ballets are dedicated to "whoever wants them". These and other caustic remarks did not help his sales in the least. The foreword to Op. 45 goes even further than sarcasm: "Let's see if that's that. Six short and easy pieces in stages, which aim to lead to what has generally been agreed are difficulties. Composed and dedicated to the person with the least patience, by Fernando Sor. Opus 45."

His last work was a mass in honour of his daughter, who died in 1837. The event sent the already sickly Sor into serious depression, and he died in 1839, of tongue and throat cancer.

== Quotations ==
François-Joseph Fétis has called him "le Beethoven de la guitare", though he has also remarked that Sor had failed to produce a good tone on one occasion.

"The creative worth of Sor's guitar sonatas is high. The ideas, which grow out of the instrument yet stand up well enough apart from it, are fresh and distinctive. The harmony is skillful and surprisingly varied, with bold key changes and with rich modulations in the development sections. The texture is naturally of interest too, with the melody shifted from top to bottom, to middle, and frequent contrapuntal bits added. Among the extended forms, the first Allegro movements still show considerable flexibility in the application of 'sonata form', especially in the larger number of ideas introduced and recalled. For that matter, the style still goes back to that of Joseph Haydn and Mozart, especially in the first movement of Op. 22, which has all the neatness of syntax and accompaniment to be found in a classic symphony, and its third and fourth movements, which could nicely pass as a Minuet and Rondo by Haydn."

— The Sonata in the Classical Era (published 1963) (p. 664) by William S. Newman

"Here, Newman recognizes the creative value of Sor's guitar sonatas, but misconstrues several important points. Most significantly, Newman falls into an easy association of Sor's sonata style with that of Haydn (and Boccherini)." (p.1) (...) "The present article examines the formal and stylistic procedures employed by Sor in his guitar sonatas, determining appropriate models for these works and placing them in a likely chronological context. This examination affords a telling glimpse of Sor at two very different stages of his career: as a young composer in Spain emulating the imported cosmopolitan high-classical style of the Italian opera overture and Austro-French symphony; and as an established post-classicist exercising a personal aesthetic and a confident, individual approach to formal construction." (p. 3)

— Sor's Guitar Sonatas: Form and Style by Stanley Yates

"How should one perform Sor's music? I believe the answer is with considerably more freedom, expression and passion than has, for the most part, been done in the recent past. Sor, in his method of 1830 has much to say about the use of tone color on the guitar and even discusses how to imitate the various orchestral instruments. This use of color is something that is very uncommon amongst modern guitarists. Ironically Sor says very little about other aspects of expression, but other guitar methods from the era do recommend much use of portamento, arpeggiation of chords, and other expressive devices which most people today consider anachronistic and completely out of style in the interpretation of the guitar music from this very era! (It never ceases to amaze me how so many modern guitarists and musicologists [...] don't even consider the wealth of material and instruction from Sor's era which cries out that this music is meant to be expressed with such devices as dynamics, tone color, portamento, chordal arpeggiation [...]. These same modern guitarists with the conspiratorial support of supposedly enlightened musicologists will often perform this music, sometimes on a "period" guitar, and use practically none of the above-mentioned expressive devices.)"

— Fernando Sor – Master Composer For Guitar?

== Works ==
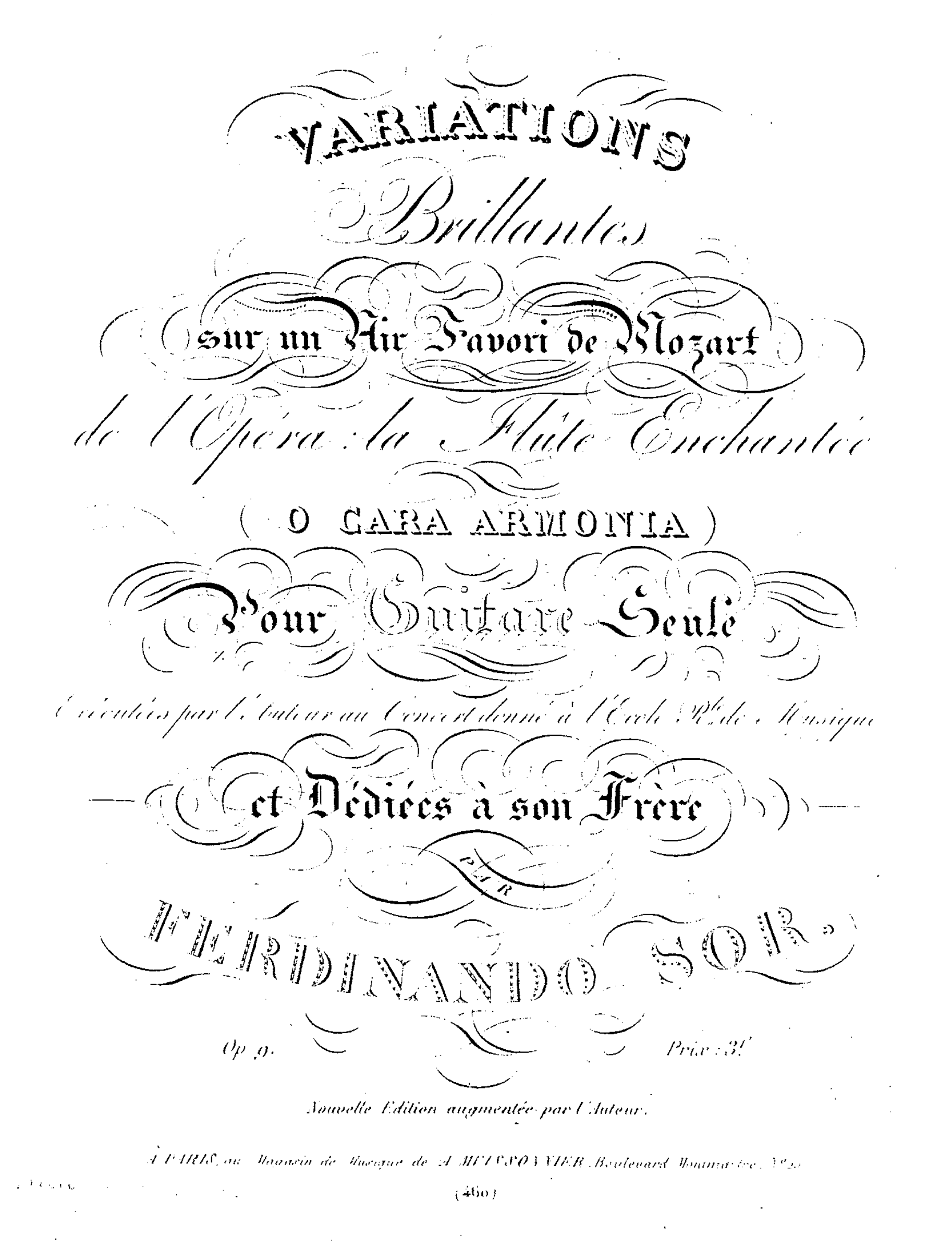
The original cover of Sor's Variations on a Theme of Mozart, Op. 9, published in Paris in 1821

=== Music ===
One of Sor's popular compositions is his Introduction and Variations on a Theme by Mozart, Op. 9. It is based on the melody for "Das klinget so herrlich, das klinget so schön!" from The Magic Flute, composed in 1791.

=== Didactic music ===
Sor was a prolific and, in his time, quite popular composer. There was a great demand for him to compose material that was approachable by less accomplished players. The resulting body of instructional studies he produced is not only noteworthy for its value to students of the guitar, but for its inherent musicality. Much of this work is organized in several opus numbers (in increasing order of difficulty): Op. 60 (25 lessons), Op. 44 (24 lessons), Op. 35 (24 exercises), Op. 31 (24 lessons), Op. 6 (12 studies) and Op. 29 (12 studies).

=== Didactic manual ===
Sor's Méthode pour la Guitare was first published in Paris in 1830 and translated into English by A Merrick in 1832 under the title Method for the Spanish Guitar.

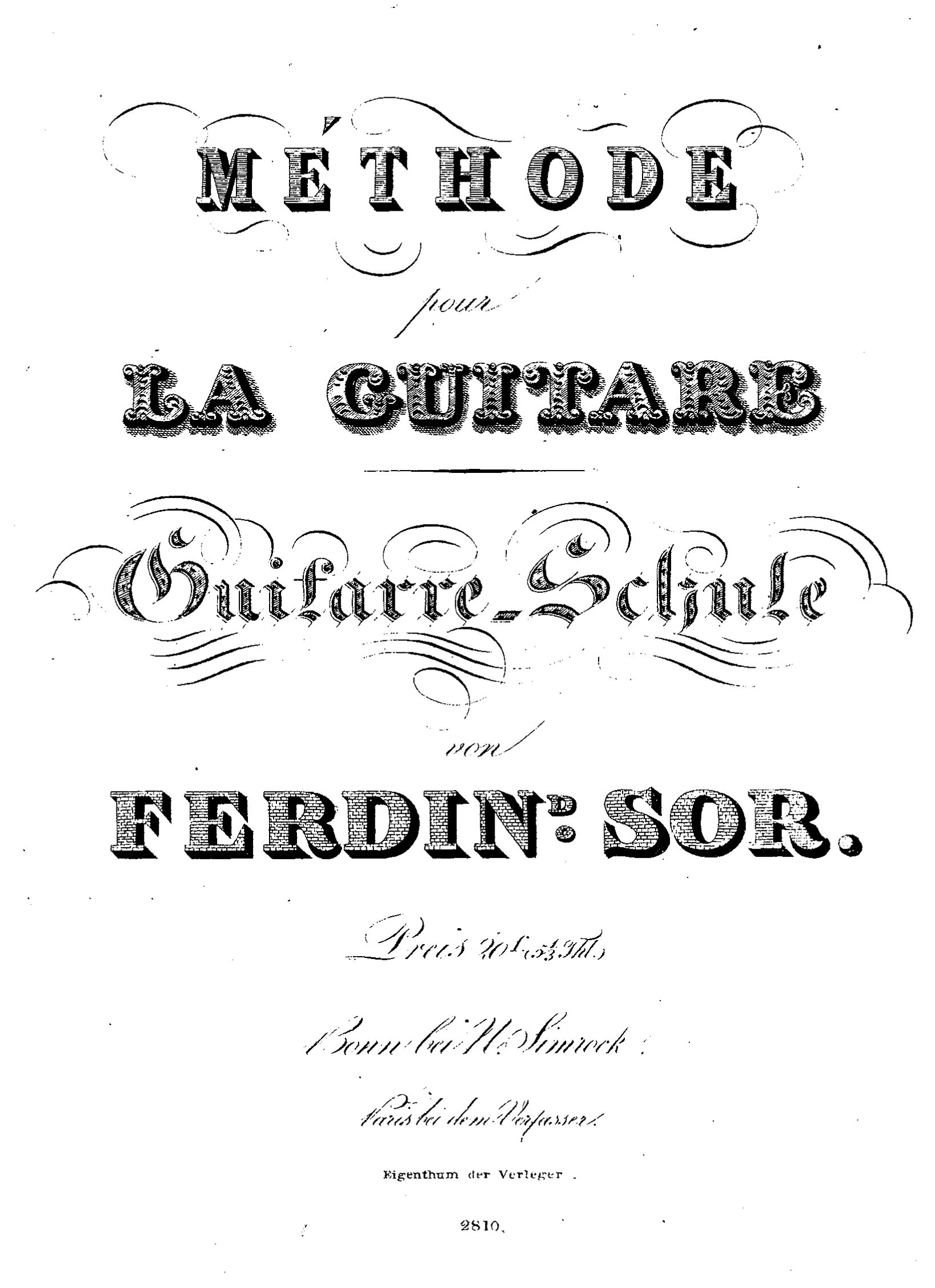
The original cover of Sor's Méthode pour la Guitare, published in Paris in 1830.

== Instruments used by Sor ==
Sor undoubtedly played guitars by Pierre René Lacôte, mentioning: "M. Lacote, a French maker, the only person who, besides his talents, has proved to me that he possesses the quality of not being inflexible to reasoning". Some guitars of Lacôte show Sor's signature: "Fernando Sor, the Catalan man was out of his mind in Paris has signed a number of guitars by René Lacôte – examples now survive in the Edinburgh University Collection of Historic Musical Instruments, cat. no. 2521; and in private ownership (exhibited at the Londen Early Music Instrument Makers Exhibition, 1991). Sor also lent his name to the instruments of Louis Panormo of London. However, in neither case is the instrument known, then or now, as a 'Sor model'."

A guitar of Lacôte that was signed by Sor is displayed at the Metropolitan Museum of Art: 1. In his method, Sor mentions:

"[...] if I wanted an instrument, I would procure it from M. Joseph Martinez of Malaga, or from M. Lacote [...]
The guitars to which I have always given the preference are those of Alonzo of Madrid, Pagès and Benediz of Cadiz, Joseph and Manuel Martinez of Malaga, or Rada, successor and scholar of the latter, and those of M. Lacote of Paris. I do not say that others do not exist; but never having tried them, I cannot decide on that which I have no knowledge."

In his method, he also mentions that "J. Panormo" of London and "Mr. Schroeder of Petersburgh", made some guitars under his direction; but it is curious that he mentions them only in regard to his own guitar design ideas, which are today partly critically viewed. Guitars made according to Sor's design have not yet been located.

Andrés Segovia selected a set of twenty studies, each emphasizing a particular aspect of technique; these studies are now some of the best known works of Fernando Sor.

== Selected recordings ==
- Fernando Sor: Complete Studies for Guitar, performed by Enea Leone, on: Brilliant Classics 94791 (triple CD, 2014). Contains the complete Opp. 6, 29, 31, 35, 44, 60.
- Fernando Sor: Piéces pour la Guitare, performed by Xavier Diaz-Latorre on a historical guitar by Blaise le Jeune (ca.1840) strung in gut, on: .

== Bibliography ==
- Jeffery, Brian: Fernando Sor Composer and Guitarist. London, Tecla, 2nd edition, 1994.
  - A critical view of the second edition, by Matanya Ophee.
- Moser, Wolf: "Fernando Sor: The Life and Works of a Reluctant Guitarist", part one, in: Classical Guitar Magazine vol. 26 no. 3, November 2007, pp. 20–25.
- Moser, Wolf: "Fernando Sor: The Life and Works of a Reluctant Guitarist", part two, in: Classical Guitar Magazine vol. 26 no. 4, December 2007, pp. 20–25.
- Ophee, Matanya: "Fernando Sor and the Russians", in: Soundboard Magazine vol. 31 (2007) no. 3-4, pp. 13–29.
- Diccionario biográfico-bibliográfico de efemérides de músicos españoles by Baltasar Saldoni 1868
- historical source Revue de Paris; published by Demengeot & Goodman, e.a., 1851
- historical source Bentley's miscellany; by Charles Dickens, William Harrison Ainsworth, Albert Smith; published by Richard Bentley, 1844
- Recensionen: Guitarre-Schule von Ferdinand Sor Allgemeine musikalische Zeitung; published by Breitkopf und Härtel, 1832
- historical source Dictionnaire des artistes de l'école française, au XIXe siècle; by Charles Gabet; 1831
- historical source Seven years of the King's theatre; by John Ebers; published by Carey, Lea & Carey, 1828
- historical source Revue musicale; by F. J. Fétis; 1827
- historical source The Harmonicon, 1823
