= 1860 in art =

Events from the year 1860 in art.

== Events ==
- February 27 – Matthew Brady takes the first of his photographs of Abraham Lincoln.
- February 28 – The Artists Rifles is established as a volunteer corps of the British Army with headquarters at Burlington House in London.
- May 23 – Dante Gabriel Rossetti marries his model Elizabeth Siddal in Hastings and they depart on honeymoon to Paris.
- December 30 – Towarzystwo Zachęty do Sztuk Pięknych ("Society for the Encouragement of Fine Arts") holds its first meeting in Warsaw.
- Founding of the Montreal Museum of Fine Arts.

== Awards ==
- Grand Prix de Rome, painting: Ernest Michel
- Grand Prix de Rome, sculpture: Barthélemy Raymond
- Grand Prix de Rome, architecture: Joseph Louis Achille Joyau
- Grand Prix de Rome, music: Emile Paladilhe

== Works ==
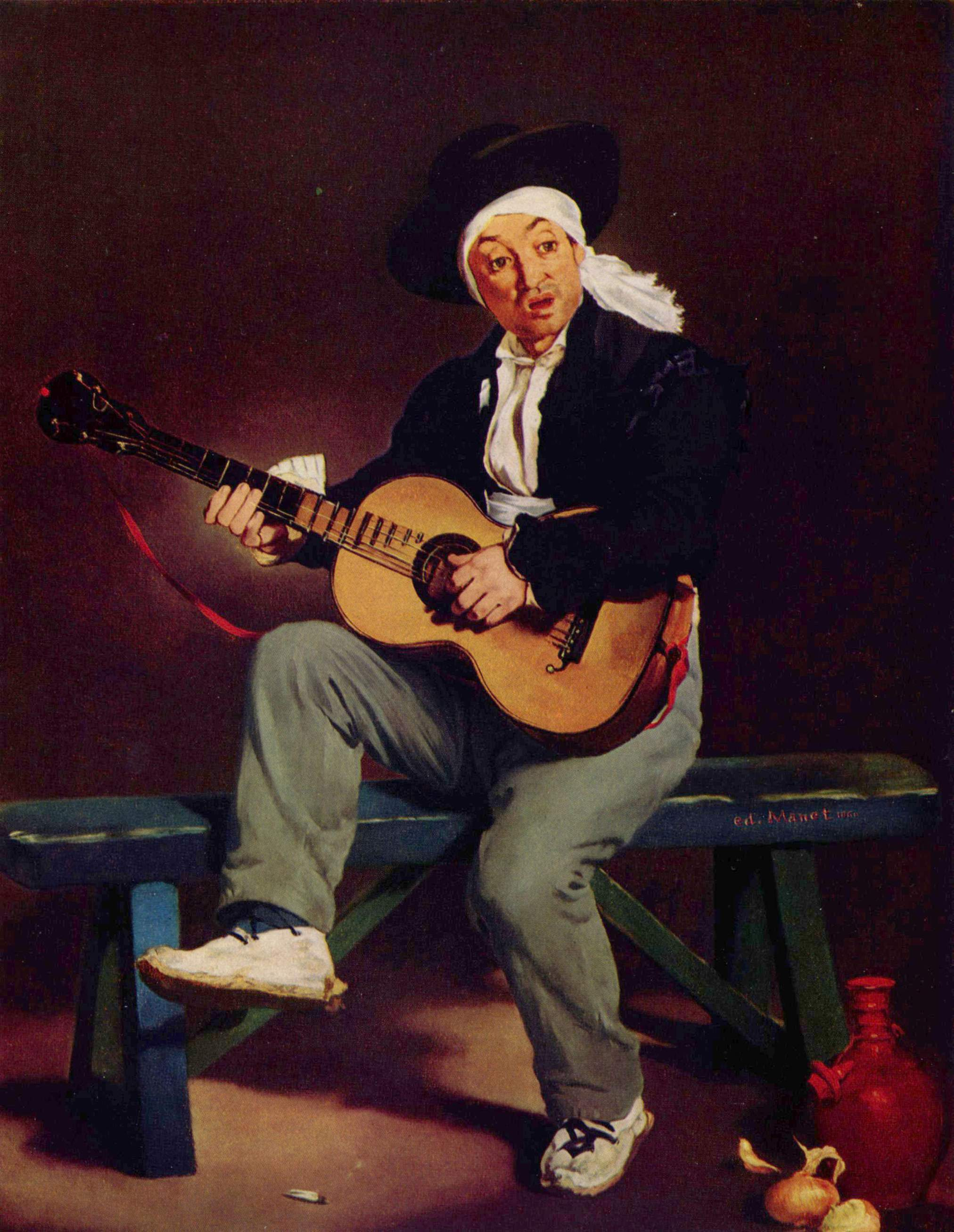
Manet – The Spanish Singer

- Lawrence Alma-Tadema – A Bargain: Brabant Women
- Paul-Jacques-Aimé Baudry – Charlotte Corday
- Edward Burne-Jones – Clara von Bork and Sidonia von Bork
- Paul Cézanne - The Four Seasons
- William Dyce
  - George Herbert at Bemerton
  - The Man of Sorrows
  - Pegwell Bay, Kent – a Recollection of October 5th 1858
- Frederick Daniel Hardy – The Volunteers
- Francesco Hayez
  - Massimo d'Azeglio
  - Self-portrait at the age of 69
- Hiroshige II – Iwatake mushroom gathering at Kumano in Kishū
- John Callcott Horsley – Showing a Preference
- William Holman Hunt – The Finding of the Saviour in the Temple
- Daniel Huntington – Chocorua Peak, New Hampshire
- Eugène Isabey – Hurricane Before Saint Malo
- John Lucas – Portrait of William Peel
- Édouard Manet
  - Portrait of M. and Mme. Auguste Manet (Musée d'Orsay, Paris)
  - The Spanish Singer (Metropolitan Museum of Art, New York)
- John Everett Millais – The Black Brunswicker
- Clark Mills – Equestrian statue of George Washington, Washington, D.C.
- Henry Nelson O'Neil – A Volunteer
- John Phillip – The Marriage of Victoria, Princess Royal
- William Bell Scott – Ailsa Craig
- Rebecca Solomon – Peg Woffington's Visit to Triplet
- Simeon Solomon – The Mother of Moses
- John Roddam Spencer Stanhope – Robin of Modern Times
- Edward Matthew Ward –
  - The Investiture of Napoleon III with the Order of the Garter
  - Queen Victoria at the Tomb of Napoleon
- G. F. Watts – Alice Prinsep
- Canova Lions (bronze castings)
- James McNeill Whistler – The Thames in Ice

== Births ==
- January 1
  - John Cassidy, Irish sculptor and painter (died 1939)
  - Jan Vilímek, Czech illustrator and painter (died 1938)
- January 29 – William Jacob Baer, American miniature painter (died 1941)
- February 21 – Goscombe John, Welsh sculptor (died 1952)
- February 27 – Vardges Sureniants, Armenian painter (died 1921)
- April 6 – René Lalique, French glass designer (died 1945)
- May 30 – Archibald Thorburn, Scottish-born wildlife painter (died 1935)
- May 31 – Walter Sickert, English Impressionist painter (died 1942)
- June 1 – Hugh Thomson, Irish-born illustrator (died 1920)
- June 18
  - George Frampton, English sculptor (died 1928)
  - Laura Muntz Lyall, Canadian Impressionist painter (died 1930)
- June 25 – Sutherland Macdonald, English tattoo artist (died 1942)
- August 5 – Louis Wain, English cat portrait painter (died 1942)
- August 18 – Iso Rae, Australian Impressionist painter (died 1940)
- September 7 – Grandma Moses (born Anna Mary Robertson), American folk artist (died 1961)
- September 16 – Solomon Joseph Solomon, English portrait painter (died 1927)
- September 30 – Vincenzo Irolli, Italian painter (died 1949)
- October 4 – Sidney Paget, British illustrator (died 1908)
- date unknown – Iris Nampeyo, Hopi potter and ceramic artist (died 1942)

== Deaths ==
- January 20 – William Charles Ross, British painter of historical paintings, miniatures and portraits (born 1794)
- February 16 – Denis Auguste Marie Raffet, illustrator and lithographer (born 1804)
- March 28 – Jean-Pierre Franque, French historical subjects and portraiture painter (born 1774)
- April 6 – Louis Stanislas Marin-Lavigne, French painter and lithographer (born 1797)
- April 28 – Jakob Guttmann, sculptor (born 1811)
- June 15 – Juan Antonio Ribera, Spanish Neoclassical historical painter (born 1779)
- June 20 – Joseph Willibrord Mähler, German portrait painter (born 1778)
- August 22 – Alexandre-Gabriel Decamps, painter (born 1803)
- September 21 – Antoine Maurin, French lithographer (born 1793)
- October 2 – Louis Hersent, French painter (born 1777)
- October 3
  - Alfred Edward Chalon, Swiss portrait painter (born 1780)
  - Rembrandt Peale, American artist (born 1778)
- date unknown
  - Dai Xi, Chinese painter of the 19th century and representative of the academic manner (born 1801)
  - Ernestine Panckoucke, French botanical illustrator and flower painter (born 1784)
