= The Spanish Singer =

Painting by Édouard Manet

- Le Chanteur espagnol (French)
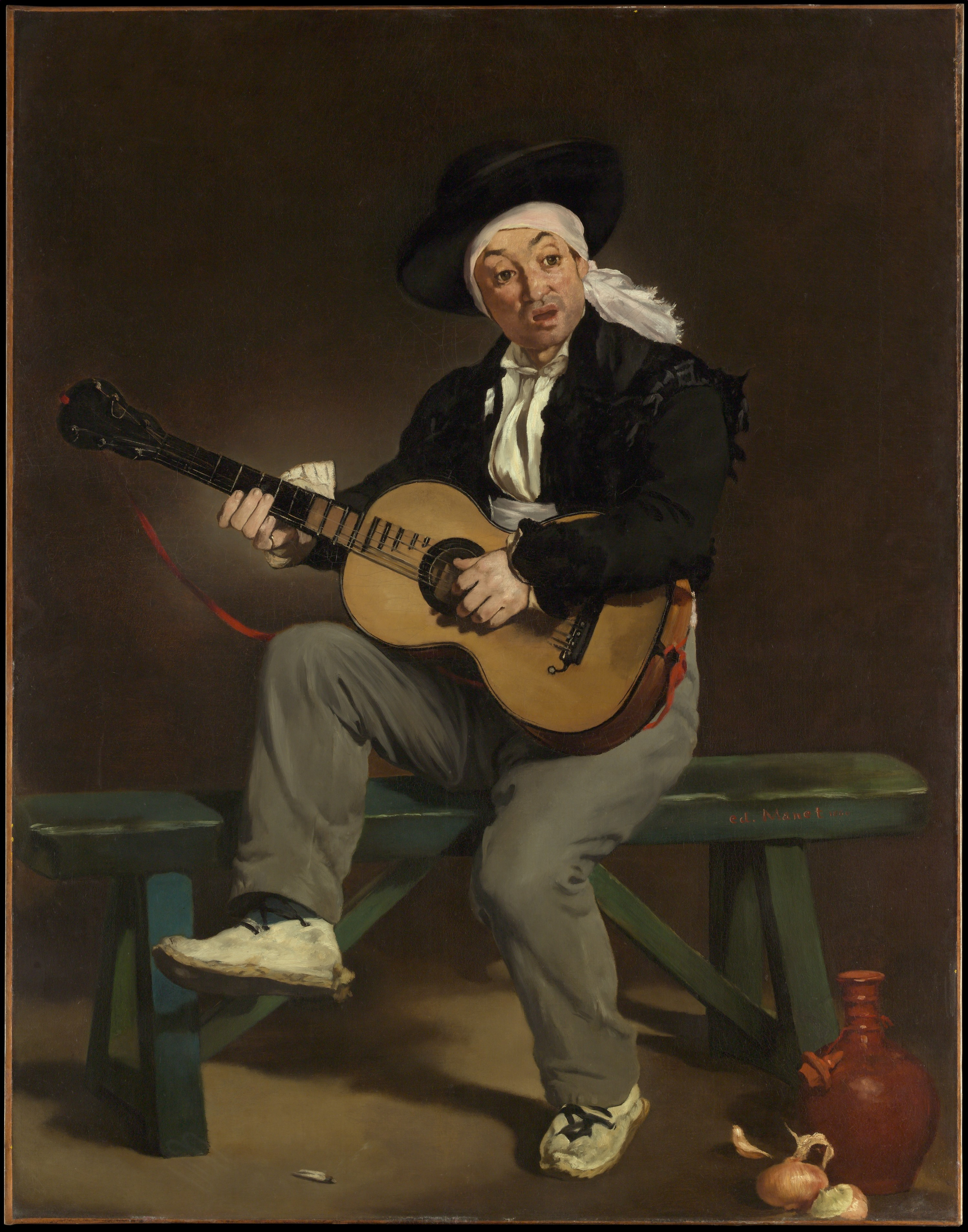
- Artist: Édouard Manet
- Year: 1860
- Medium: oil on canvas
- Dimensions: 147.3 cm × 114.3 cm (58 in × 45 in)
- Location: Metropolitan Museum of Art; New York

The Spanish Singer (Le Chanteur espagnol), also known as Guitarrero, is an 1860 oil painting on canvas by the French painter Édouard Manet, conserved since 1949 at the Metropolitan Museum of Art of New York.

Composed in Manet's studio, it employed a model and props which were later used for at least one other painting. This work, both realistic and exotic in its depiction of its subject, exhibits the influence of Spanish art, especially that of Diego Velázquez, on Manet's style. Manet, due to this painting, was accepted for the first time at the Salon of Paris in 1861, where he also exhibited a portrait of his parents.

The Spanish Singer was well received by critics. It was appreciated by French writer Charles Baudelaire, and by French journalist and literary critic Theophile Gautier, who praised the painting for its "very true color" and "vigorous brush". Manet consequently became the leader of the avant-garde movement and inspired a group of young artists, including Henri Fantin-Latour and Carolus-Duran, who decided to visit Manet's studio.

== Description ==
The Spanish Singer depicts a life-sized Spanish guitarist seated on a bench as he plays his guitar. Despite the work's title, the model's clothing is not regionally specific or completely Spanish. The scene was staged in Manet's studio using a mix of clothing he had on hand. Théophile Gautier identified the jacket as a type from Marseilles and suggested the figure appeared more French than Spanish, describing him as a "guitarrero from Montmartre." The identify of the model has been the subject of debate. Adolphe Tabarant suggested that the scene was inspired by the Andalusian guitarist Trinidad Huerta and that Manet used a model from Seville. Others have suggested that Manet used a musician known as Bosch as his model.

=== Versions ===
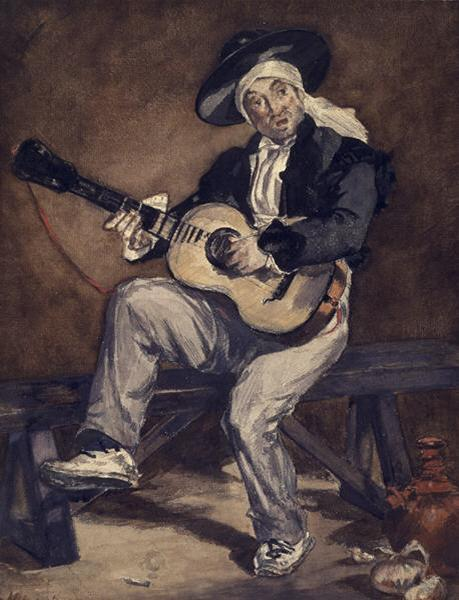
Watercolor version of the Spanish Singer, (28.58 × 21.59 cm)

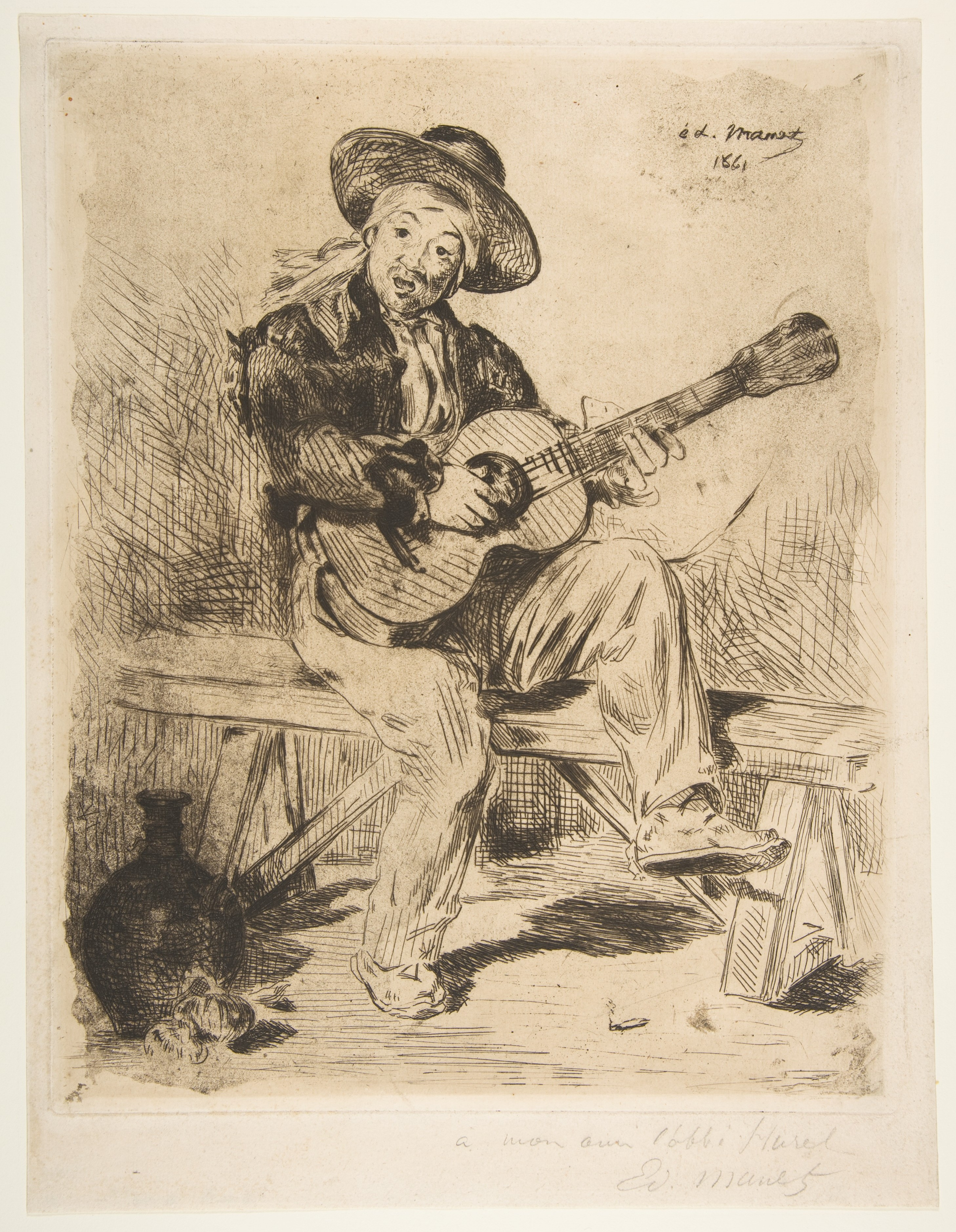
Etching of the Spanish Singer, approx. (28.6 × 21.6 cm)

After the success of the oil version of The Spanish Singer, Manet produced several other versions of the work, including an etching and watercolor. The watercolor, now held in the Dallas Museum of Art, is a reduction of the full-scale oil. Shortly after the success of the oil painting in the salon, Antonin Proust, a friend of Manet's and the owner of the original oil painting, likely requested a copy of the work for him. According to Juliet Wilson Bareau, Manet began by tracing a photograph of the painting, using the framework for both the watercolor and the print. The etching was produced in 1861-1862 and printed by the notable printer Auguste Delâtre.

== Reception ==
The painting's vibrant color, bold brushwork, and exotic "Spanish" subject aligned with the era's taste for Spanish culture. The painting was originally hung very high, but the audience loved the work so much that it was later lowered to a more advantageous spot. Theophile Gautier provided some of the most vocal praise: "With such a spirited voice, he sings out his song while strumming his jambon. We can almost hear him. ... There is much talent in this life-size figure, painted with a bold brush and in very true color."

== Spanish themes by Manet in the MET ==
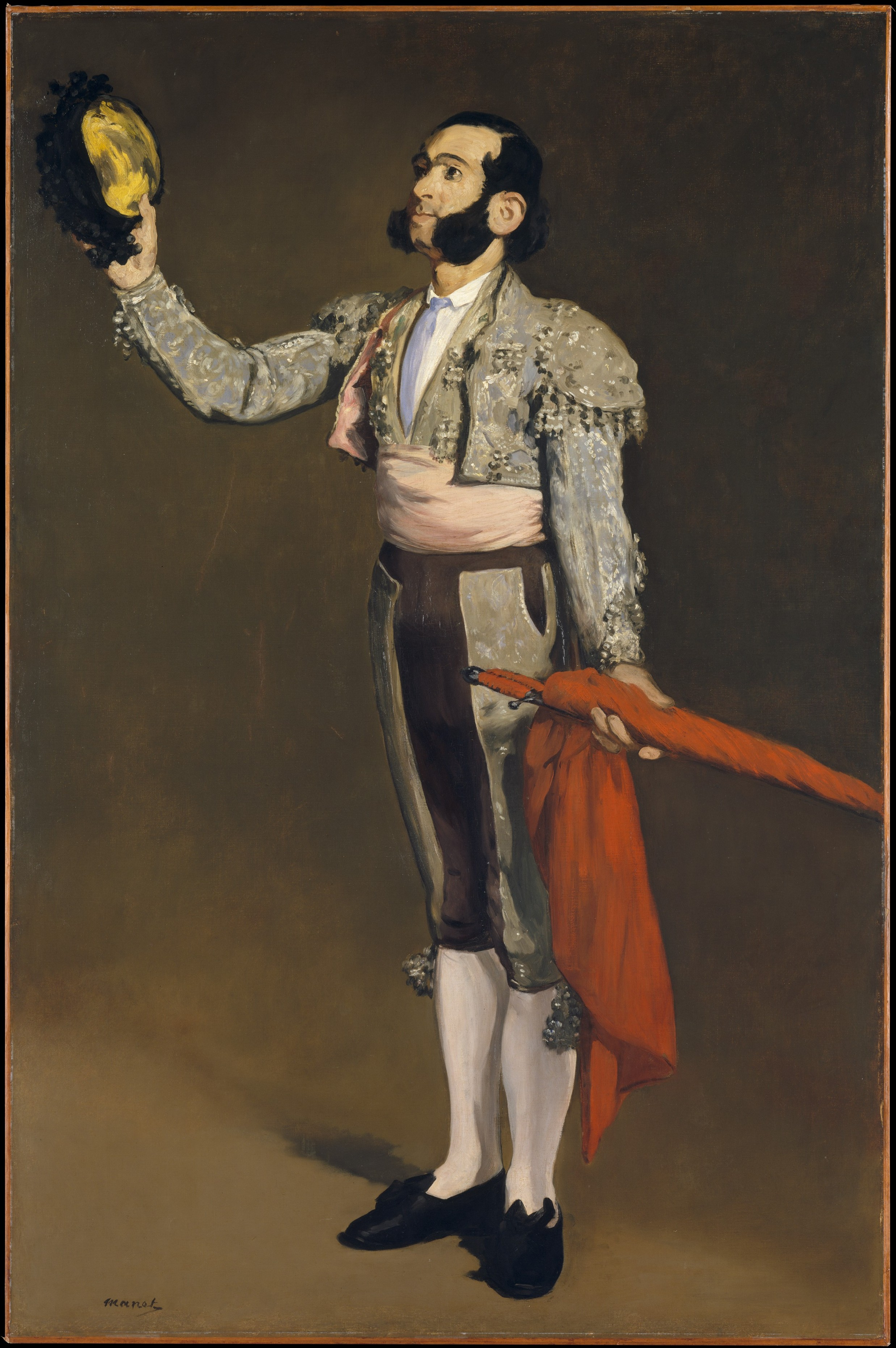
A Matador 1866–67

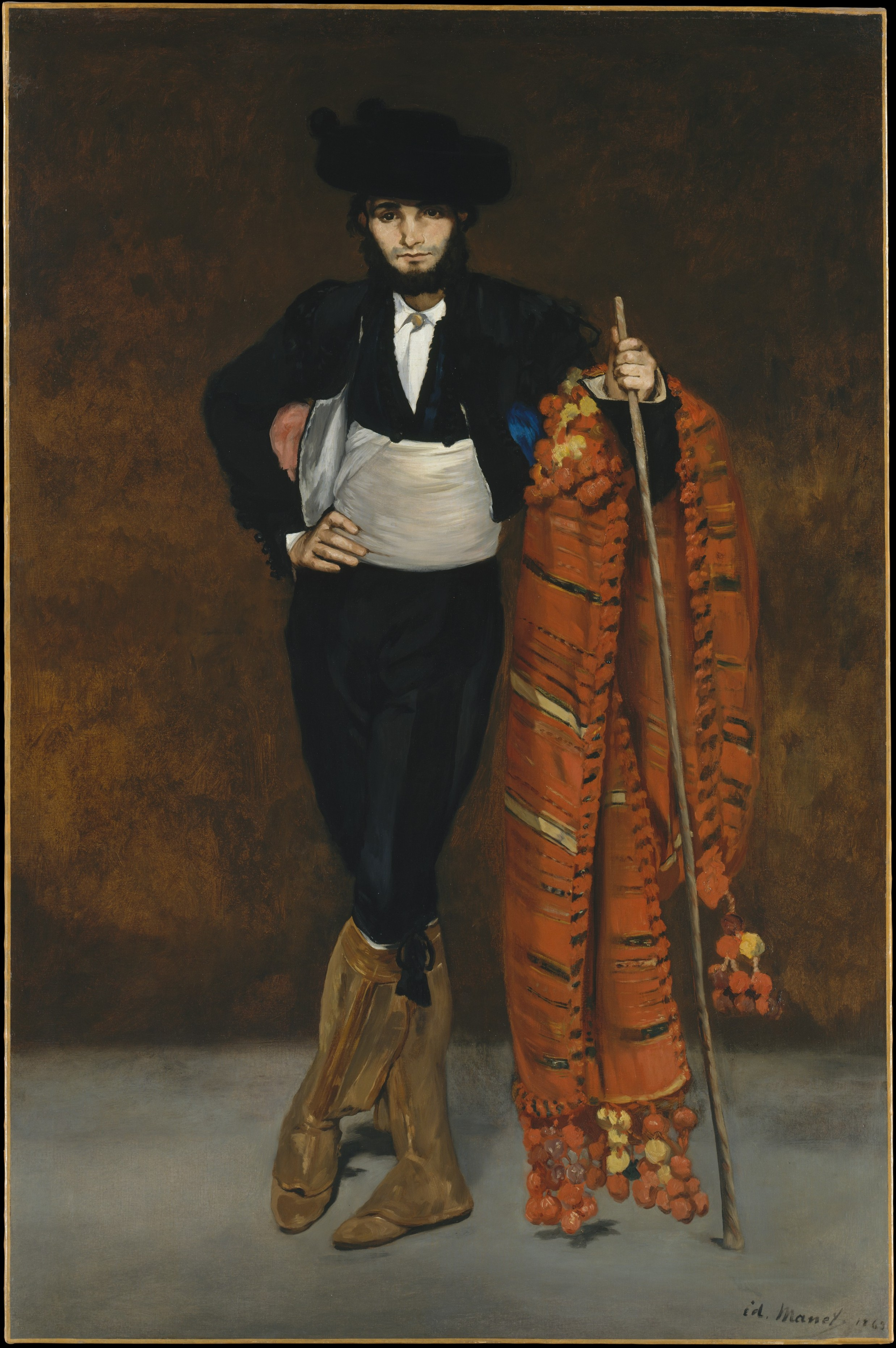
Young Man in the Costume of a Majo 1863

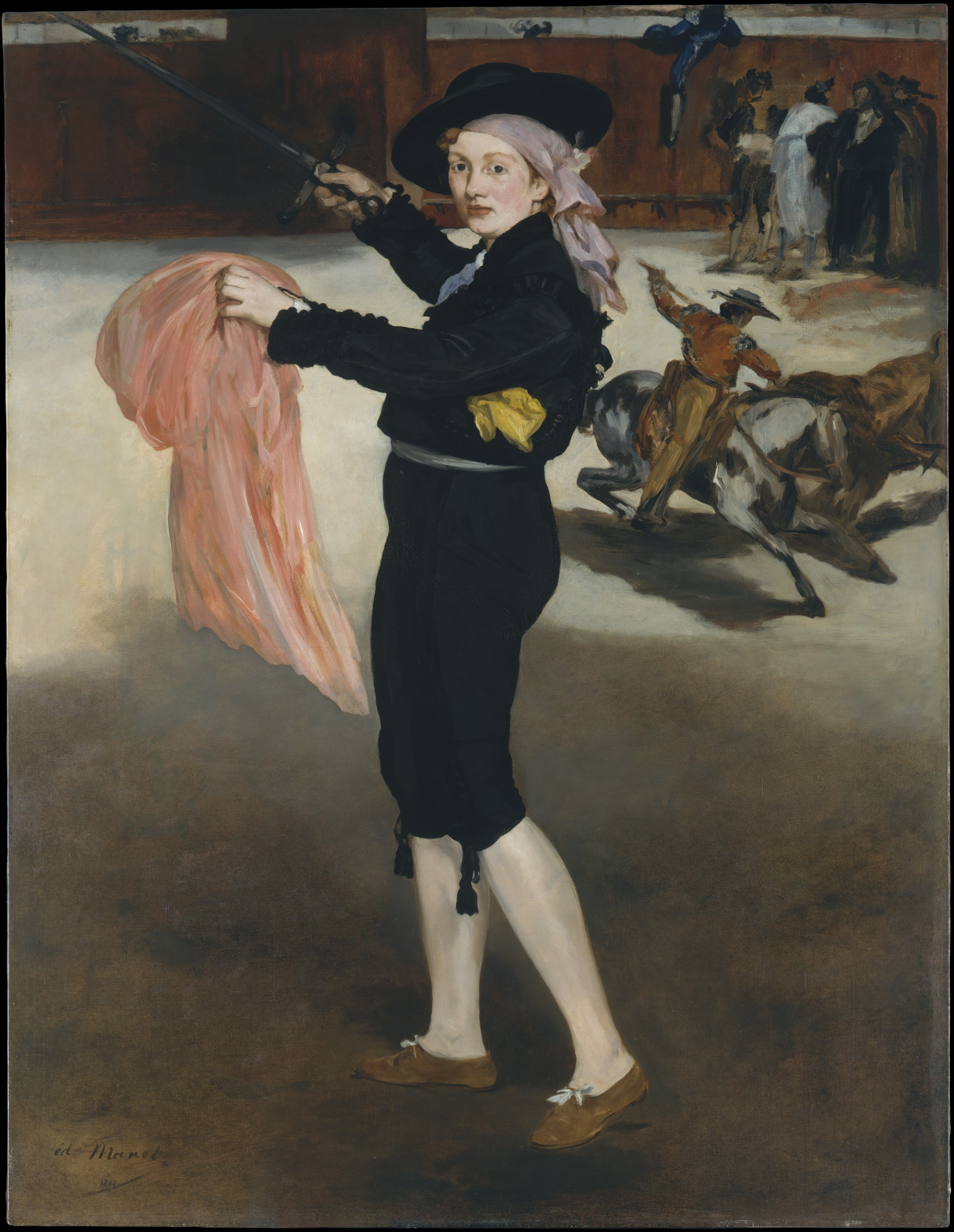
Mademoiselle Victorine Meurent in the Costume of an Espada 1862

== See also ==
- List of paintings by Édouard Manet
- 1860 in art
