= Trinidad Huerta =

Spanish guitarist and composer (1800–1874)

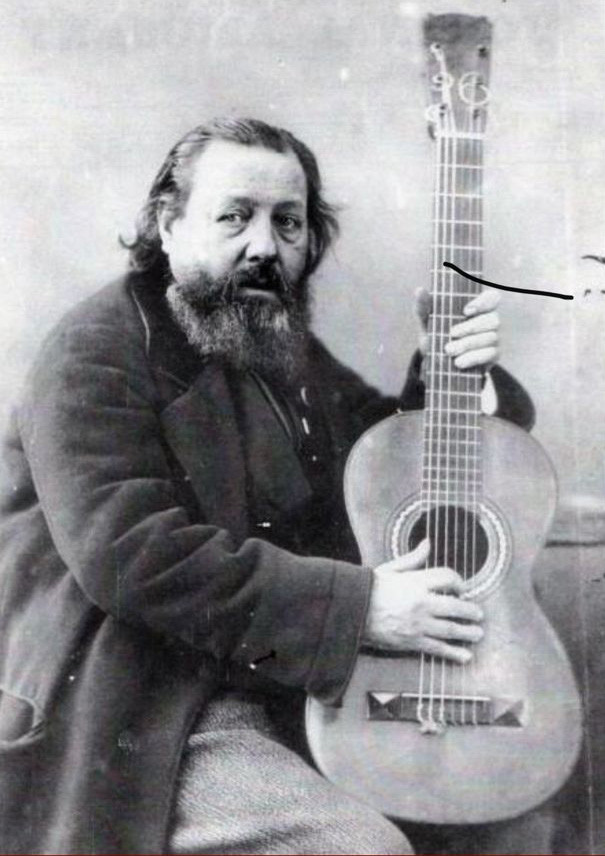
- Trinidad Huerta photographed by Nadar
- Born: Trinitario Pascual Francisco Agustín Pedro Miguel María Ruberto Bruno Ventura Huerta Caturla; June 8, 1800; Orihuela, Spain
- Died: June 19, 1874 (aged 74); Paris, France
- Other name: A.T. Huerta
- Occupations: Guitarist, composer
- Notable work: Himno de Riego (disputed)
- Awards: Order of Charles III

Trinitario Pascual Francisco Agustín Pedro Miguel María Ruberto Bruno Ventura Huerta Caturla, better known as Trinidad Huerta (born June 8, 1800, in Orihuela, Spain – died June 19, 1874, in Paris, France) was a Spanish guitarist and composer.

Recognized for his virtuosity on the guitar, he undertook numerous tours throughout the United States and Europe. He played concerts for the queens of Spain and England, and the kings of Belgium, France and Portugal. In some of his concerts, he was accompanied by other notable musicians such as Fernando Sor, Dionisio Aguado, Frédéric Chopin, and Franz Liszt.

His skill with the guitar earned him the nickname "the Paganini of the guitar". He was praised by his contemporaries, including writer Victor Hugo and composer Hector Berlioz, who characterized him as one of the three best musicians of his time.

== Biography ==
=== Early life ===
Trinidad Huerta was born on June 8, 1800, in Orihuela, Spain, into a well-to-do family of Pedro Huerta y Morales and Francisca Caturla y Maseres. He was baptized in the parish of San Salvador in that city, with the names Trinitario, Pascual, Francisco, Agustín, Pedro, Miguel, María, Ruberto, Bruno, and Ventura. His paternal grandfather was Juan Huerta y García, the Chief Magistrate of Sueca, Spain. His maternal grandfather was a lawyer of the Royal Councils and a familiar of the Holy Office of the Inquisition of Murcia, as well as the Chief Magistrate of Murcia.

He began his studies at the College of San Pablo in Salamanca, abandoning them at the age of fifteen. In 1819, it is believed that he participated in the Riego Uprising. Some attribute to him the creation of the music of the Himno de Riego, although this is disputed.

He started his career as a guitarist in the early 1820s. On April 6, 1823, Huerta's first recorded concert took place at the café La Cruz de Malta, where he presented himself as a "disciple of the celebrated Sor", in reference to the composer and guitarist Fernando Sor. He then went to Paris, where he gave at least two concerts under the tutelage of the tenor Manuel García. There, he also came into contact with composer Gioachino Rossini.

=== In the United States ===
On March 31, 1824, Huerta embarked with Manuel García for New York, where they arrived after a 28-day journey. On May 15th, under the auspices of the Philharmonic Society, he gave his first concert at the City Hotel, becoming the first Spanish guitar player to perform in the United States. The National Advocate newspaper characterized the event as "the most extraordinary exhibition of musical talent ever seen or heard".

On May 24, 1824, he married pianist Sabina Meucci, daughter of miniature painter Antonio Meucci. Sabina's exact age at the time of her marriage is unclear, although it is known that she was very young. On June 5th, Huerta gave his second concert in New York, this time at Washington Hall, accompanied by his wife Sabina on piano.

On June 16, 1824, he gave his first concert in Philadelphia, at Masonic Hall. He then performed concerts in Baltimore, Saratoga, and again in New York. The concert in New York took place on September 9th, and General Lafayette was present. The following day Lafayette attended another concert by Huerta, this time in Philadelphia. Around that time, Herta also met English dramatic actor Edmund Kean after playing during the intermission of one of his plays. Huerta and Kean later would meet again in Europe.

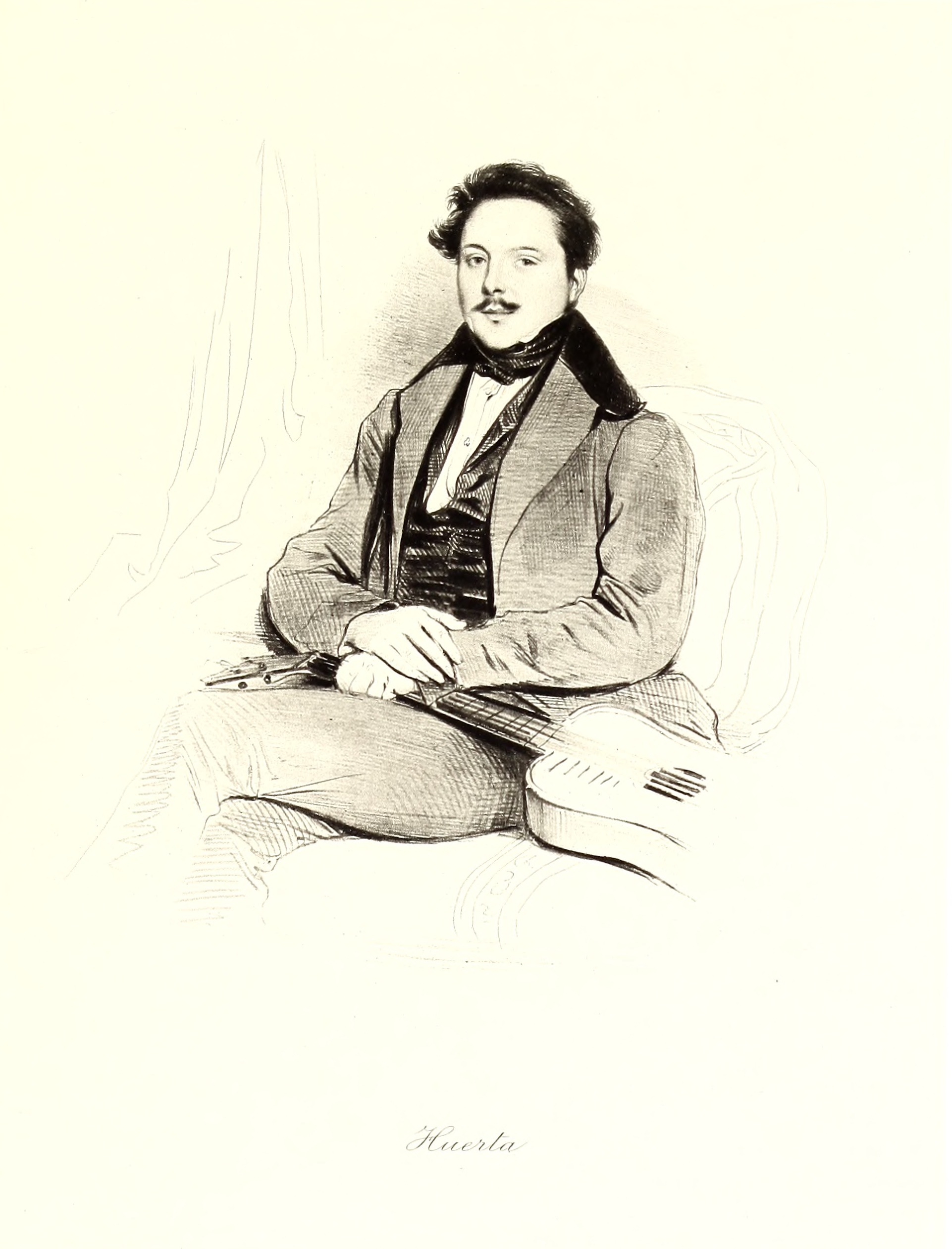
Trinidad Huerta around 1830, drawing by Achille Devéria

=== Back in Europe ===
In 1826, he emigrated to Havana, Cuba, but returned to London the following year, where he began to associate with aristocratic musical circles. There, he played with some of the leading musicians of the time, such as Johann Baptist Cramer, Ignaz Moscheles, Franz Liszt, Nicolas Mori, and Charles-Auguste de Bériot. He also did a performance accompanied by English singer Catherine Stephens.

In November 1828, claiming to be single, he married Angiolina Panormo, daughter of the famous English luthier Louis Panormo.

In January 1831, Huerta arrived in Paris, just six months after the July Revolution and the coronation of Louis Philippe I. Initially, things did not go well for him here, as the country was socially agitated. However, thanks to the help of the composer Gioachino Rossini, he gave two concerts. Between the end of 1831 and the beginning of 1832, he established himself in the circle of Antoine Fontaney, through whom he met and played for Honoré de Balzac and Delphine Gay. Shortly thereafter, Gay would dedicate an improvised poem to him. Huerta remained in Paris, giving concerts for the next three years and participating in performances given by Franz Liszt and Frédéric Chopin.

In 1834, he was back in Spain and resided in Barcelona, Valencia, and Madrid. From June 1838, he was again in England giving concerts in London, Manchester, Liverpool, and Dublin. One of his concerts played in 1840 in Paris was positively reviewed by Hector Berlioz published in Le Journal des débats. The same year, he returned to Spain and gave concerts in Madrid, Tortosa, Barcelona, Seville, and Cádiz.

Between the end of 1843 and the middle of 1844, he gave several concerts in Brussels, with a small audience and his popularity in decline. In 1845, Julián Arcas decided to become a concert artist after attending one of Huerta's concerts in Málaga. At the end of May 1846, he began a long series of concerts throughout northern Spain. In 1847, he played for Queen Isabella II, who awarded him the Order of Charles III and a sum of 8,000 reales. In January 1848, news began to appear claiming that Huerta had died. However, records of new concerts exist. In 1854, he played for the king of Portugal Ferdinand II.

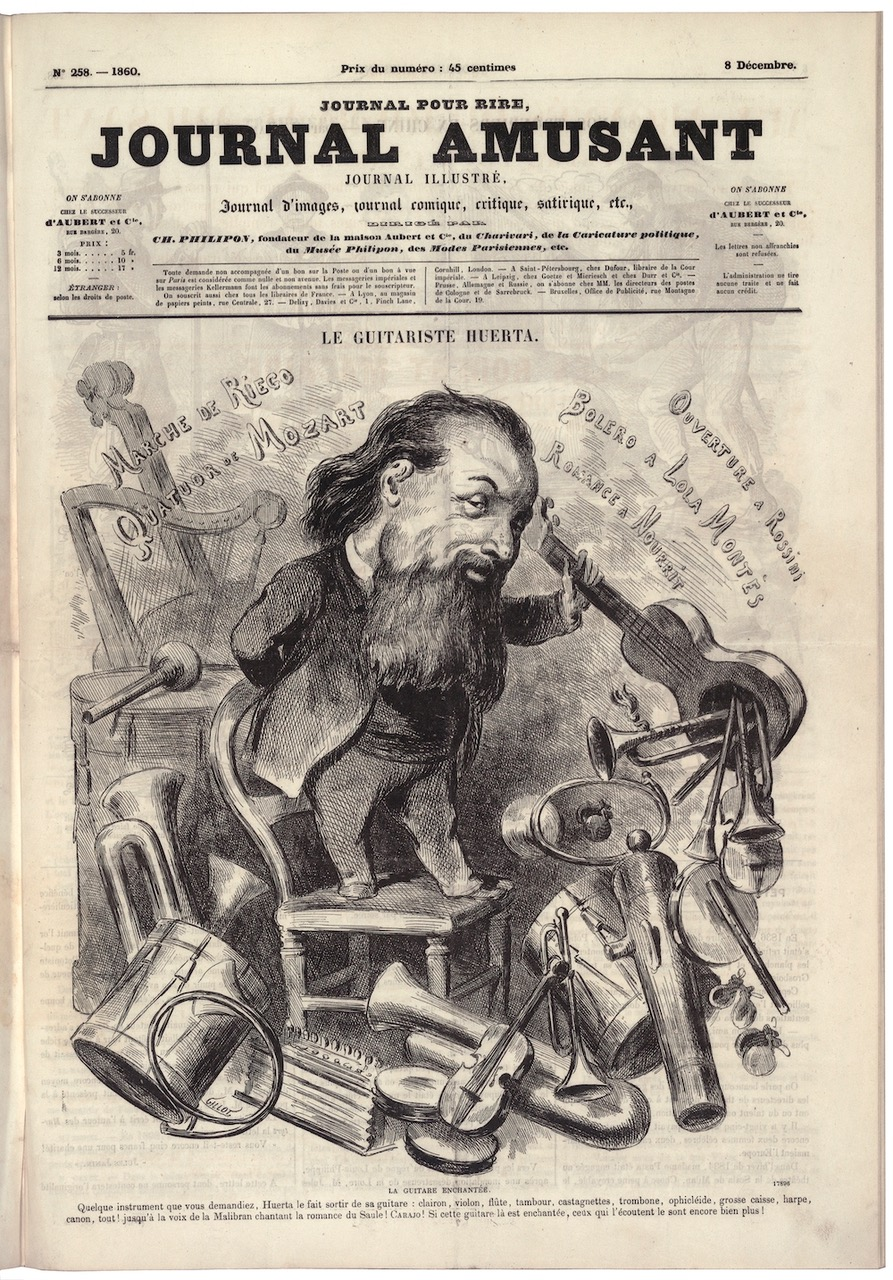
Caricature of Trinidad Huertab by Claude Gillot in Journal amusant, December 8, 1860

=== Last years ===
Towards the end of 1858, Huerta settled in Barcelona, where he played several concerts, including one held at the Odeón theater where he presented his son as a violinist of great potential. On January 7, 1865, writer Philibert Audebrand published an article titled "L'Hymne de Riégo" in the literary magazine Revue de Paris, where he recounts his meeting with Huerta at the Charles Philipon home and states that he was known as "the best musician of modern Spain", attributing the authorship of the Himno de Riego to him.

In Brussels, he played before the queen of Belgium in December 1871, and played his last known concert in April 1872. Two years later, a newspaper article published in La España Musical stated that he was in conditions of poverty, forced to play the guitar in the streets of Paris.

Huerta died in Paris on June 19, 1874, almost forgotten. His remains were modestly buried in the Père Lachaise Cemetery.

== Legacy ==
Critic Antonio Fargas y Soler attributed Trinidad Huerta's success in Europe to his strumming technique. Although he is a little-known figure today, Huerta was in his time one of the most prominent personalities in 19th-century music. In recent decades, performers and researchers have begun to recover his work and recognize his role in the history of the instrument.

His skill with the guitar earned him the nickname "the Paganini of the guitar". He was praised by his contemporaries, including writer Victor Hugo and composer Hector Berlioz, who characterized him as one of the three best musicians of his time.

== Compositions ==
- Seis Grandes Válses
- Gran Vals 91 The Hymn of Riego: a much admired Spanish quick step arranged for the piano forte (disputed)
- Three Waltzes
- Four Divertimentos
- Souvenir of the Fair at Mairena in Spain
- A Spanish National Cachucha, With Variations
- Six Waltzes
- Grand Waltz, de la Solitudine
- Grande Wals 114 Five Waltzes
- Bolero
- Wals
- Three Divertimentos
- The celebrated Fantasia, founded on Rossini’s Overture to Semiramide
- Grand March, from La Gazza Ladra
- Chi Mai di Questo Core
- à la Mémoire d’Adolphe Nourrit
- Recitativo & Pastorela
- Recuerdo Triste
- Souvenir d’une Soirée a Passy, Symphonie Fantastique
- Nouvelle Grande Fantaisie sur le thême de la Cachucha Nationale
- Fantaisie
- Favorite Romance on a Scotch Air with Variations
- 6 Pequeñas Tocatas o Divertimentos Favoritos para los Discípulos
- Recuerdo de mi Diva Bianca – Abanera (sic)
- Círculo Harmónico
- Favorito Jaleo (de Cádiz)
- Vals de la Esperanza
- Minué, tempo de Vals
- Souvenir de París, rondó
- Lola Montès

== Bibliography ==
- Torres Cortés, Norberto (2014). "Trinidad Huerta y la guitarra rasgueada pre-flamenca" [Trinidad Huerta and the Pre-Flamenco Strummed Guitar]. Música oral del Sur (in Spanish) (11). ISSN 1138-8579.
- Suárez-Pajares, Javier (2020). "El paganini de la guitarra. Crónica de viajes y peripecias del concertista romántico liberal Trinidad Huerta (1800-1874)" [The Paganini of the Guitar: Chronicles of Travels and Adventures of the Romantic Liberal Virtuoso Trinidad Huerta (1800–1874)] (PDF). Canelobre (in Spanish) (71). ISSN 0213-0467.
