= Juan Jiménez Martín =

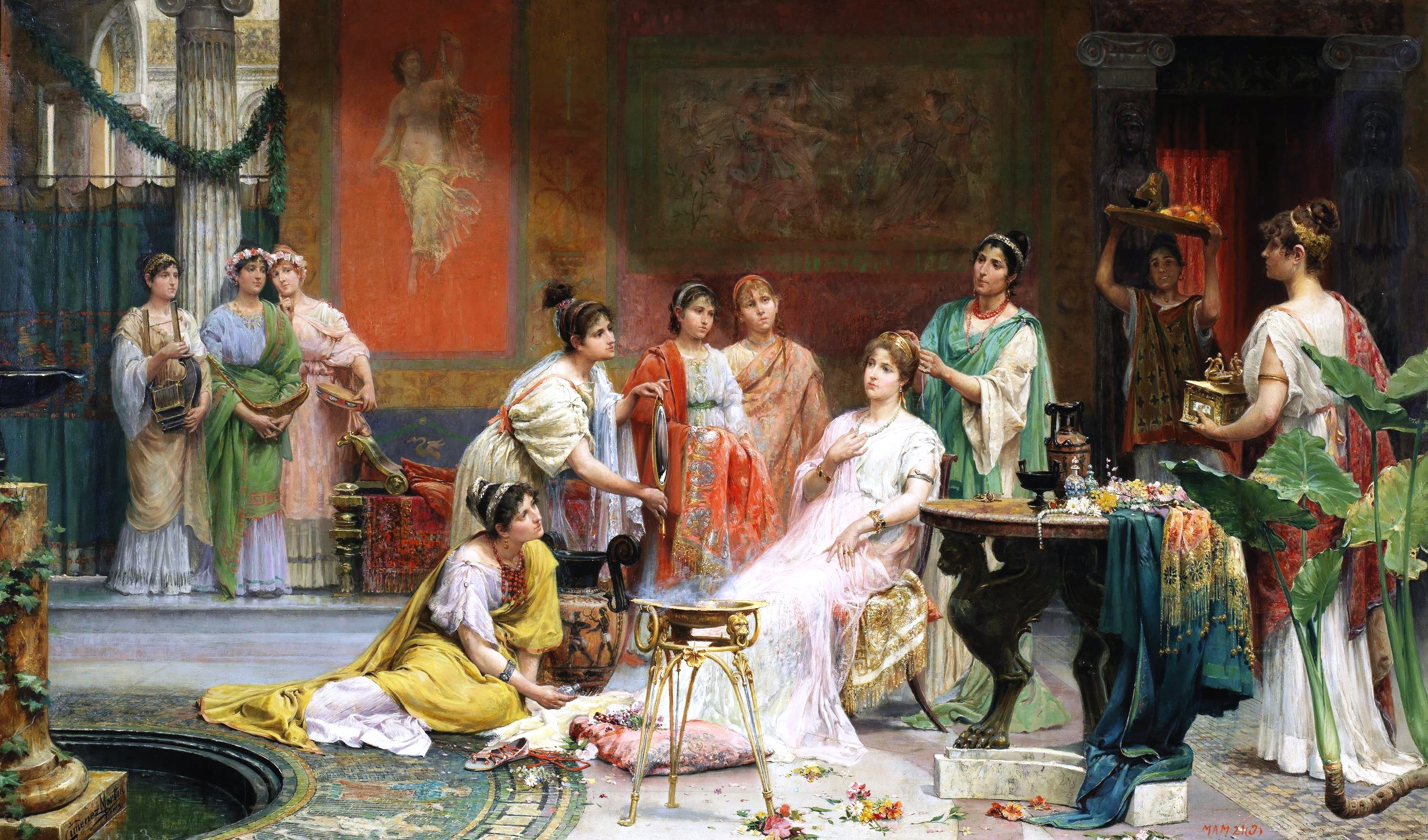
A Roman Lady at Her Dressing Table

Juan Jiménez Martín (27 May 1858, Ávila - 1901, Madrid) was a Spanish painter who specialized in historical scenes. Some sources give his year of birth as 1855, and his name as "Giménez".

== Biography ==
He studied at the Real Academia de Bellas Artes de San Fernando in Madrid, under the tutelage of Federico de Madrazo, Carlos Luis de Ribera and Carlos de Haes.

In 1881, he was granted a stipend by the Diputación Provincial de Ávila, that enabled him to study abroad. He settled in Rome, where he received a scholarship to the Academia Española de Bellas Artes de Roma. He was enrolled there from 1882 to 1886 and, inspired by the works of Mariano Fortuny, began creating Orientalist paintings. During his stay there, he also visited Florence, Naples and Venice; producing mostly landscapes.

Upon returning to Ávila, he presented the Diputación with his portrait of "Doña Ximena Blázquez", a heroine of the Reconquista.

He was a regular exhibitor at the National Exhibition of Fine Arts from 1876, when he presented a still-life, until the year of his death, when he received a third-class medal for his depiction of the interior of Ávila Cathedral. His entry for 1895, "A Roman Lady at her Dressing Table", has been displayed at the Congress of Deputies since 1904.

== Sources ==
- Carlos González, Pintores españoles en Roma (1850-1900), Tusquets Editores S.A., Barcelona, 1987 ISBN 978-84-7223-932-6
- Bernardino de Pantorba, Historia y critica de las Exposiciones Nacionales de Bellas Artes Celebradas en España, revised ed., J. Ramón García-Rama, Madrid, 1980 ISBN 978-84-300-2141-3
