= Edward Daniel =

Edward Daniel may refer to:

- Edward St John Daniel (1837–1868), English soldier and Victoria Cross recipient
- Ed Daniel (born 1990), American basketball player
