= Canova Lions =

Replica sculptures in Washington, D.C., U.S.

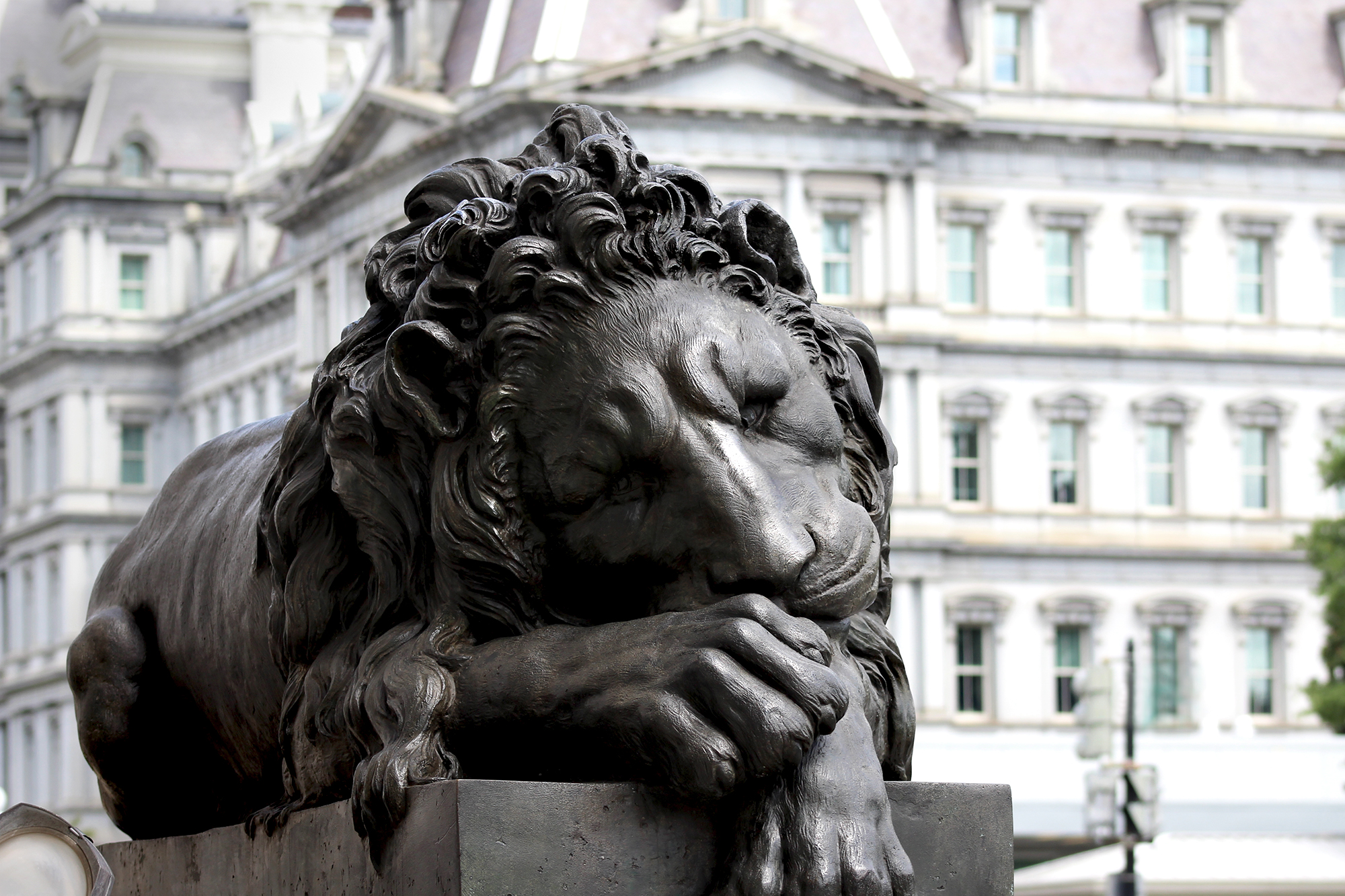
- One of the sculptures in 2017
- Artist: Antonio Canova
- Year: 1792
- Medium: Bronze
- Subject: Lions
- Location: Corcoran Gallery of Art, Washington, D.C.
- 38°53′45.2″N 77°2′22.5″W

The Canova Lions, located in front of the Corcoran Gallery of Art in Washington, D.C., are copies of a pair of lions sculpted by Antonio Canova in 1792 for the tomb of Pope Clement XIII in St Peter's in Rome. The originals were sculpted from marble; these were cast in bronze from molds of the originals. The pieces were installed in 1860.

== See also ==
- 1860 in art
- List of public art in Washington, D.C., Ward 2
