= Jacob Guptil Fletcher =

Jacob Guptil Fletcher (November 22, 1825 – December 3, 1889) was an American artist and art conservator.

Born in Maine, Fletcher was a clerk in Boston in the 1850s and identified himself as an artist after 1860. He lived in Boston, Portland, Maine, and Columbus, Ohio before moving to Washington, D.C., in the 1880s. He reportedly had a studio in the Corcoran Gallery until 1890. He advertised his services in Columbus as a portrait painter "from Life or from Photographs; Old Paintings cleaned, repaired and varnished".

He exhibited at the Boston Athenæum in 1858 and 1874. In 1875 Fletcher exhibited two works at the Cincinnati (Hamilton) Industrial Exposition. His painting Still Life with Vase & Grapes (date unknown) was sold at Christie's in New York in 1998 for $3,680.

Fletcher was primarily a portrait painter, and his portraits of Kent Bunting, Nicholas Emery (a copy of the original painting by H.C. Pratt) and Paul Ansel Chadbourne were in the collection of Phillips Exeter Academy in Exeter, New Hampshire. The Emery portrait was destroyed in the 1914 fire at the academy. Whereabouts of the Chadbourne portrait (an Exeter Academy graduate and classical language instructor) are unknown.

== Known works ==
Still lifes

- La Pensee, exhibited at the 1875 exposition, 2009 whereabouts unknown
- Reading & Reflecting, exhibited at the 1875 exposition, 2009 whereabouts unknown
- Still Life with Vase & Grapes, 2009 whereabouts unknown

Portraits

- Paul A. Chadbourne, 2009 whereabouts unknown
- Nicholas Emery, destroyed by fire 1914
- Portrait of a woman (possibly mother of Dedham's first school superintendent), April 1869, 20"x24", 2009: Dedham Historical Society, gift of Barbara Sawhill and John Mullaney.
