= William Peel (Royal Navy officer) =

Recipient of the Victoria Cross

Captain Sir William Peel VC KCB
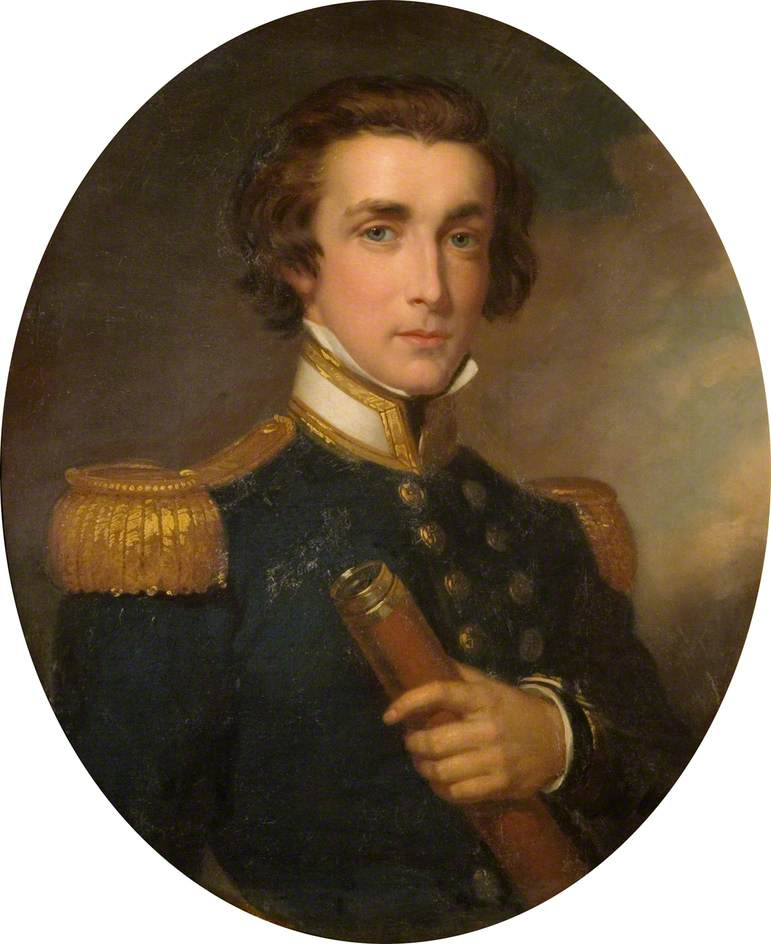
- Born: 2 November 1824; Mayfair, London, UK
- Died: 27 April 1858 (aged 33); Cawnpore, British India
- Burial place: Old British Cemetery, Cawnpore, India
- Relatives: Sir Robert Peel (father)
- Military career
- Allegiance: United Kingdom
- Branch: Royal Navy
- Rank: Captain
- Units: Naval Brigade
- Commands: HMS Diamond; HMS Shannon
- Conflicts: Syrian War; Crimean War; Indian Mutiny
- Awards: Victoria Cross; Order of the Bath; Légion d'honneur (France)
- Other work: Travel writer

Portrait of William Peel by John Lucas, 1860. It depicts him during the Relief of Lucknow

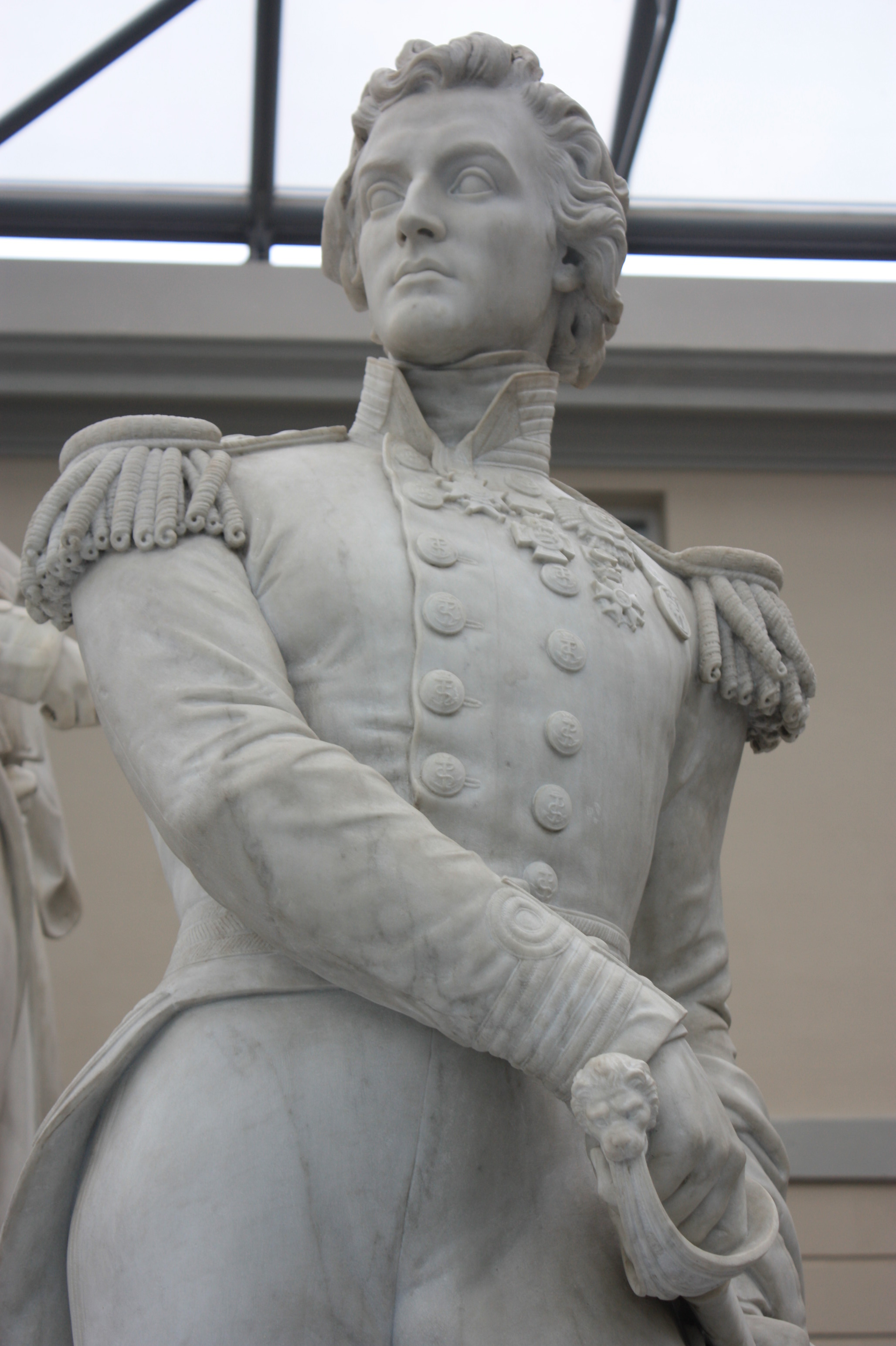
Sir William Peel by William Theed, 1860, Greenwich Maritime Museum

Captain Sir William Peel VC KCB (2 November 1824 – 27 April 1858) was a British naval officer and recipient of the Victoria Cross, the highest and most prestigious award for gallantry in the face of the enemy that can be awarded to British and Commonwealth forces. He was the third son of the Prime Minister Sir Robert Peel and his wife Julia. Like his father, he was educated at Harrow School.

He was made a Knight Commander of the Order of the Bath, and thus became Sir William Peel.

== Military career ==
Peel was a captain in the Royal Navy, serving with the Naval Brigade during the Crimean War. On 18 October 1854 at the Siege of Sevastopol, he picked up a live shell with the fuse still burning from amongst several powder cases and threw it over the parapet. The shell burst as it left his hands. For this he was awarded the Victoria Cross (VC); it is now displayed at the National Maritime Museum in Greenwich, England.

On 5 November at the Battle of Inkerman, he joined some of the officers of the Grenadier Guards and helped to defend the Colours of the regiment when they were hard-pressed. On 18 June 1855, he led the first scaling party at the assault on the redan and was himself severely wounded. On each of these occasions Captain Peel was accompanied by a young midshipman, Edward St. John Daniel, as Aide-de-camp.

After the Crimean War, he served in the Indian Mutiny and was wounded at the Relief of Lucknow. At the age of 33, he died of smallpox at Cawnpore, India, on 27 April 1858.

== Travel ==
Captain Peel wrote A Ride through the Nubian Desert (1852), detailing his travels of the preceding year.

== Memorials ==
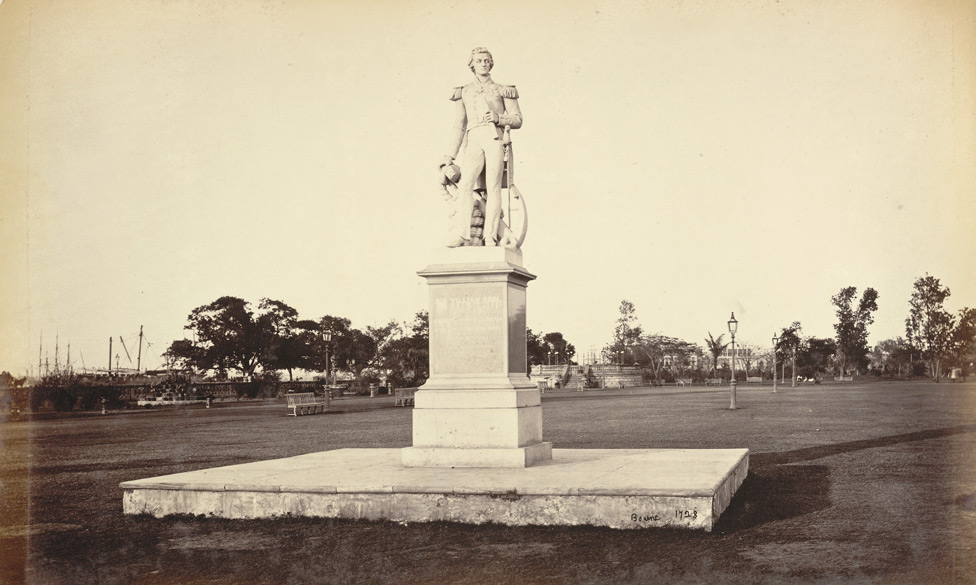
Statue of William Peel in the Eden Gardens, Calcutta, in the 1860s.

There is a memorial to Captain Peel and the Naval Brigade from HMS Shannon on the seafront at Southsea, England.

There is a statue of William Peel by William Theed in the south transept of Saint Swithun's Church, Sandy, in Bedfordshire. There are two copies of this statue, one in the National Maritime Museum in Greenwich and one which was erected in Eden Gardens, Calcutta. This statue was moved to Barrackpore in 1977 and was due to be moved back to Calcutta in 2004 amid some confusion over its identity: it was thought to be Peel's father, Robert Peel.

Opposite Sandy church across the High Street stands the Sir William Peel pub.

A plaque at The Lodge, headquarters of the RSPB in Sandy, commemorates the 150th anniversary of the death of Captain Sir William Peel. It is situated near the Swiss Cottage which he built in the 1850s, which is now the gatehouse to The Lodge, built by his brother Arthur Wellesley Peel. A similar plaque is mounted on a bench on Sandy High Street.

A statue of Peel by William Theed stands in the centre of Greenwich Maritime Museum.

== See also ==
- O'Byrne, William Richard (1849). "Peel, William" . A Naval Biographical Dictionary . John Murray – via Wikisource.
