= Louis Panormo =

English luthier known for Spanish-style guitars (1784–1862)

- Born: 1784; Paris
- Died: 1862 (aged 77–78); Ōrua Bay
- Occupation: Luthier

Louis Panormo (1784–1862) was a prominent English luthier of the 19th century, best known for his classical guitars, which were among the earliest made in England to follow the Spanish design. Often referred to as the "only English guitar maker of the time to make guitars in the Spanish style," Panormo played a significant role in popularizing Spanish-style guitars in Britain during the early Romantic era.

His guitars were played by Fernando Sor and Trinidad Huerta.

== Early Life and Background ==
Louis Panormo was born in Italy in 1784, into a family of musicians and instrument makers. His father, Vincenzo Panormo, was a violin maker who had trained in Naples and worked in Paris before settling in England in 1789, probably with his four sons. Louis was the youngest

The Panormo family name was originally Panormus, a Latinized form of the name for Palermo, Sicily, suggesting their Sicilian origins.

== Career ==
Louis Panormo began working as a luthier in the early 19th century, producing violins, cellos, and guitars. He opened his first workshop in High Street, Bloomsbury, by 7 February 1817. While he initially followed his father's footsteps in violin making, he eventually focused on guitar construction, for which he became most renowned.

His guitars were heavily influenced by Spanish luthiers such as Antonio de Torres. Unlike many English guitar makers of the time who built instruments in the French style, Panormo adopted key Spanish features including fan bracing, larger soundboards, and wider fingerboards. This gave his guitars a fuller tone and improved projection, characteristics that made them highly sought after by both amateur and professional musicians.

Panormo's labels often read: "Louis Panormo – The Only Maker of Guitars in the Spanish Style" or similar phrases, asserting his distinct approach and craftsmanship. His workshop was located at various addresses in London, including Bloomsbury and High Holborn.

The Spanish guitarist Trinidad Huerta arrived in England in 1827 and, during his time there, he performed using a guitar made by Panormo. The association was mutually beneficial, with Huerta gaining a high-quality instrument and Panormo's instruments receiving increased visibility. Panormo later published Huerta’s Divertimentos, which were dedicated to his student Angelina, Panormo's daughter. In 1828, Huerta married Angelina, who was 17 years old at the time.

== Influence and Legacy ==
Louis Panormo's work had a lasting influence on guitar making in Britain. His instruments are considered to be among the finest early examples of Spanish-style guitars made outside of Spain. Today, his guitars are valued by collectors and performers for their historical significance and tonal quality.

Modern luthiers and historians often reference Panormo's instruments as a bridge between traditional English craftsmanship and Spanish innovations that would later become standard in classical guitar design.

== Death ==
Louis Panormo died in Ōrua Bay, New Zealand in 1862. His legacy lives on through the surviving instruments and the influence he had on 19th-century guitar making in Britain.

== See also ==
- Classical guitar
- Antonio de Torres
- History of the classical guitar
- Luthier
