= Edward St John Daniel =

English Victoria Cross recipient

Edward St John Daniel VC
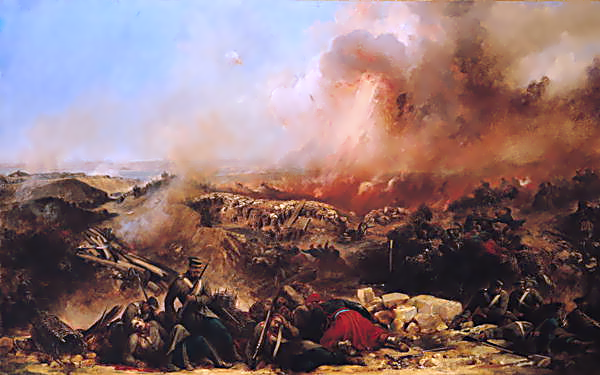
- Depiction of the Siege of Sevastopol.
- Born: 17 January 1837; 1 Windsor Terrace, Clifton, Bristol, England
- Died: 20 May 1868 (aged 31); Hokitika, New Zealand
- Military career
- Allegiance: United Kingdom
- Branch: Royal Navy
- Service years: 1851–1861
- Rank: Lieutenant
- Units: Naval Brigade
- Conflicts: Crimean War; Second Anglo-Burmese War; Indian Mutiny
- Awards: Victoria Cross (forfeited)

Edward St. John Daniel VC (17 January 1837 – 20 May 1868) was an English recipient of the Victoria Cross, the highest award for gallantry in the face of the enemy that can be awarded to British and Commonwealth forces.

== Victoria Cross ==
He was 17 years old, and a midshipman in the Royal Navy, (Naval Brigade) during the Crimean War when the following deed took place for which he was awarded the VC.

On 18 October 1854 at Sevastopol, Crimea, Midshipman Daniel was one of the volunteers from HMS Diamond, who, under the command of the captain (William Peel) brought in powder to the battery from a wagon under very heavy fire, a shot having disabled the horses. On 5 November at the Battle of Inkerman he, as Aide-de-camp (ADC) to the captain, remained by his side throughout a long and dangerous day. On 18 June 1855 he was again with his captain in the first scaling party at the assault on the Redan, binding up his superior officer's severely wounded arm and taking him back to a place of safety.

== Later life ==
Daniel also served in the Second Anglo-Burmese War and the Indian Mutiny. He later achieved the rank of lieutenant.

Daniel was the first of eight men whose VCs were forfeited. He was stripped of the medal on 4 September 1861 after being convicted of desertion and evading court-martial. His family sought the "restoration" of his award in a mid-twentieth century petition. However this was rejected with this statement: "...the restoration of forfeited awards may only be made on a petition to the Sovereign from the former recipient himself. In Daniel’s case this is not possible. Furthermore, as your proposal relates to events so long ago it is considered inappropriate to reverse the decision made in 1861 by Queen Victoria". However, he and the seven other whose awards were forfeited are officially listed as VC holders.

Daniel died at Hokitika in the South Island of New Zealand on 20 May 1868. He is buried in the Hokitika Cemetery.

== See also ==
- List of British recipients of the Légion d'Honneur for the Crimean War
