= Ernestine Panckoucke =

French botanical painter (1784-1860)

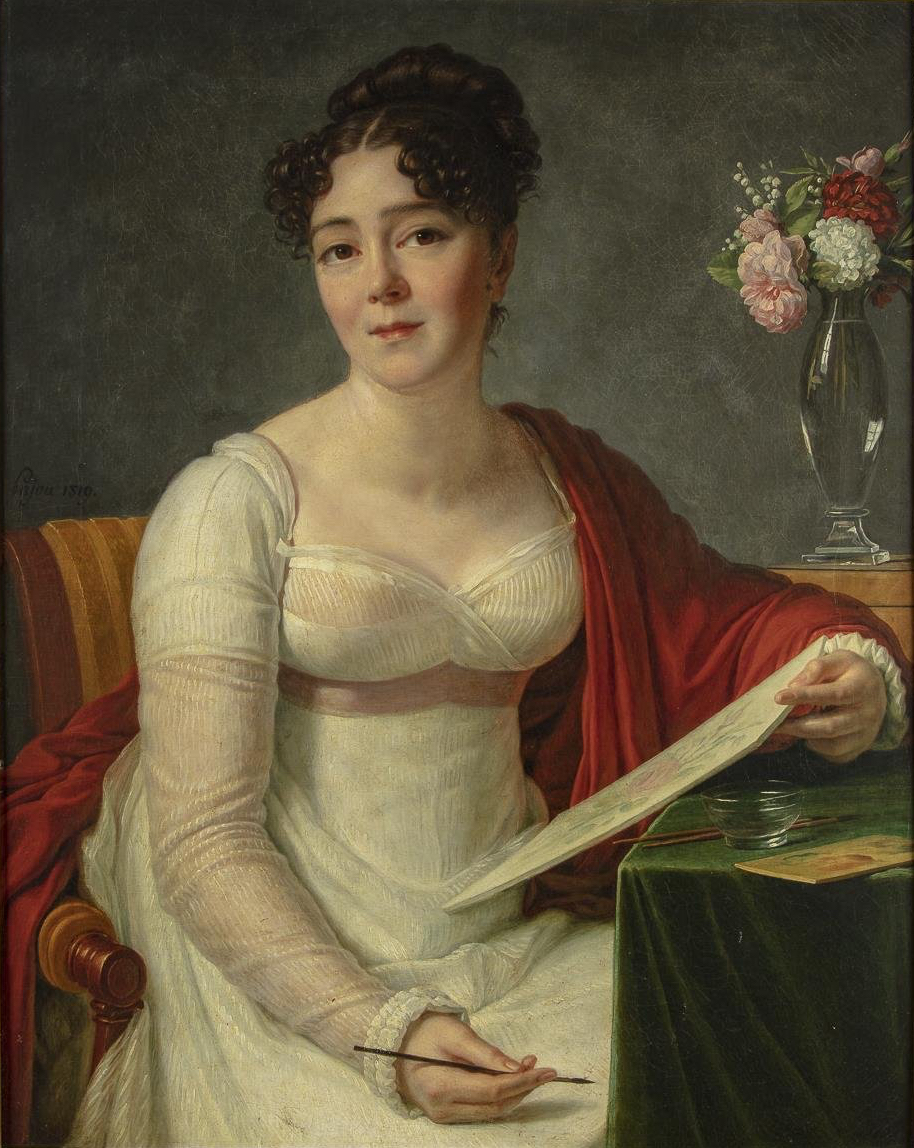
Presumed portrait of Anne-Ernestine Panckoucke, by Jacques-Augustin-Catherine Pajou, 1819

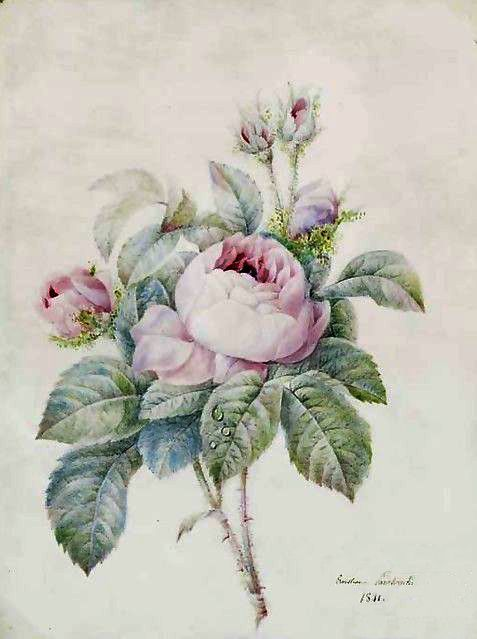
A Spray of pink Roses

Ernestine Panckoucke, née Désormeaux, a.k.a. Anne-Ernestine Panckoucke (1784-1860), was a French botanical illustrator and flower painter.

She described herself as a 'translator of Goethe's poems, pupil of Redouté and designer of Chaumeton's "Flore Médicale"', published by her husband Charles Louis Fleury Panckoucke (1780-1844). She illustrated this work with Pierre Jean François Turpin (1775-1840). She is thought to have met Redouté at either the Château de Malmaison whilst a student under Prud'hon, or at Jean-Baptiste Isabey's studio while sitting for a portrait. Afterwards she regularly attended Redoute's classes at the Jardin des Plantes. Redouté had been commissioned by Empress Joséphine to depict the roses and lilies at Malmaison.

One of her works was sold at the Duc de Berry's 1834 sale.

== Publications ==
- "Poesies de Goethe" - translated from the German by E. Panckoucke - published in 1825 in French
- "Fables" by Phèdre - published in 1834 in Latin
- "Poésies nouvelles de Magu, Tisserand à Lizy-sur-Ourcq" - published in 1842 in French

== Gallery ==
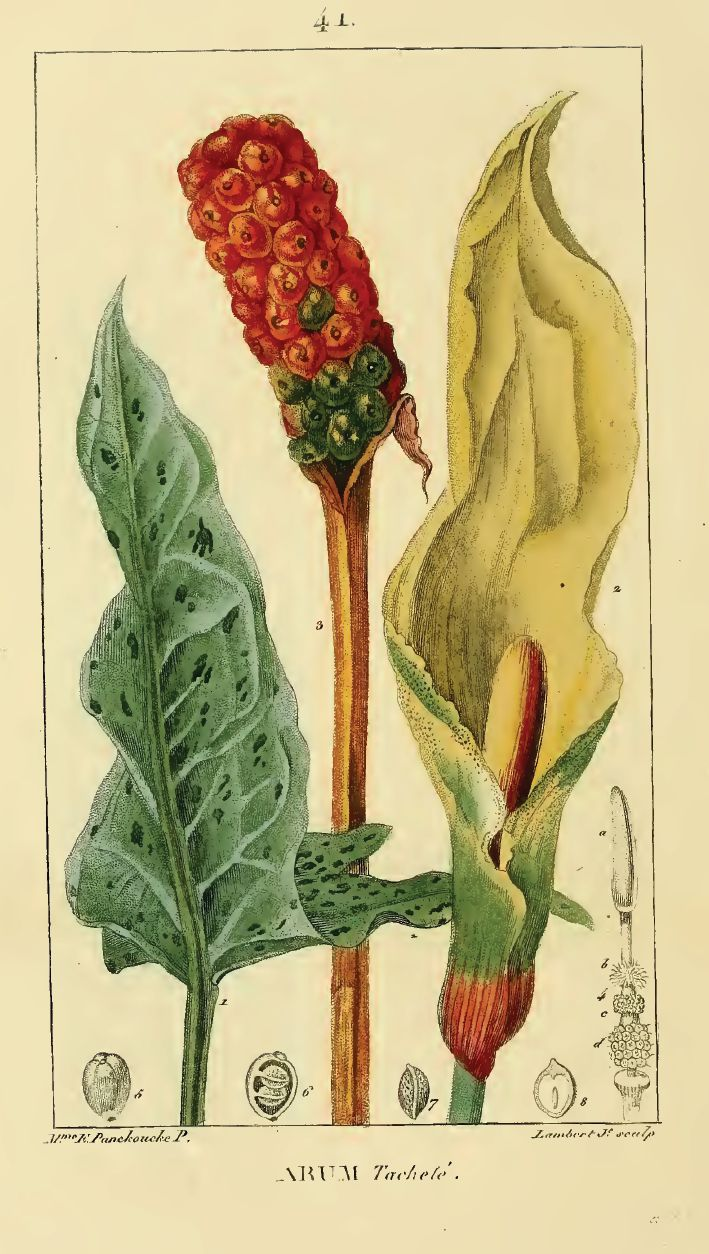
Arum maculatum

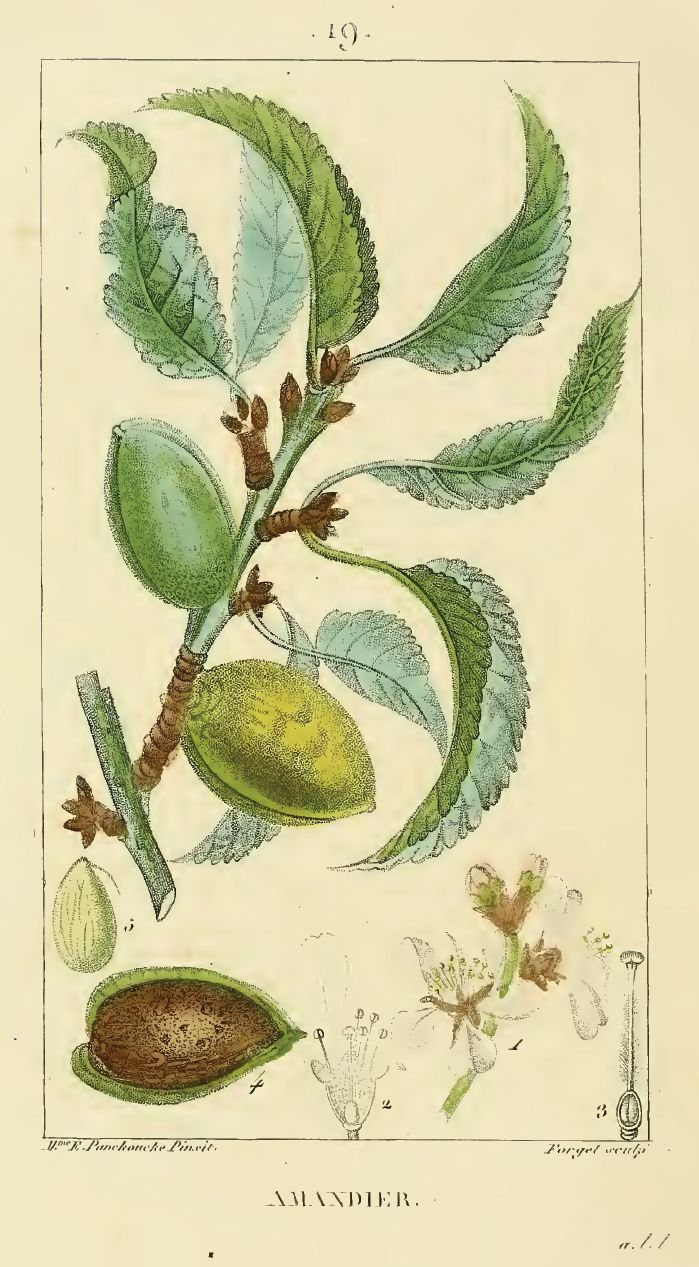
Almond

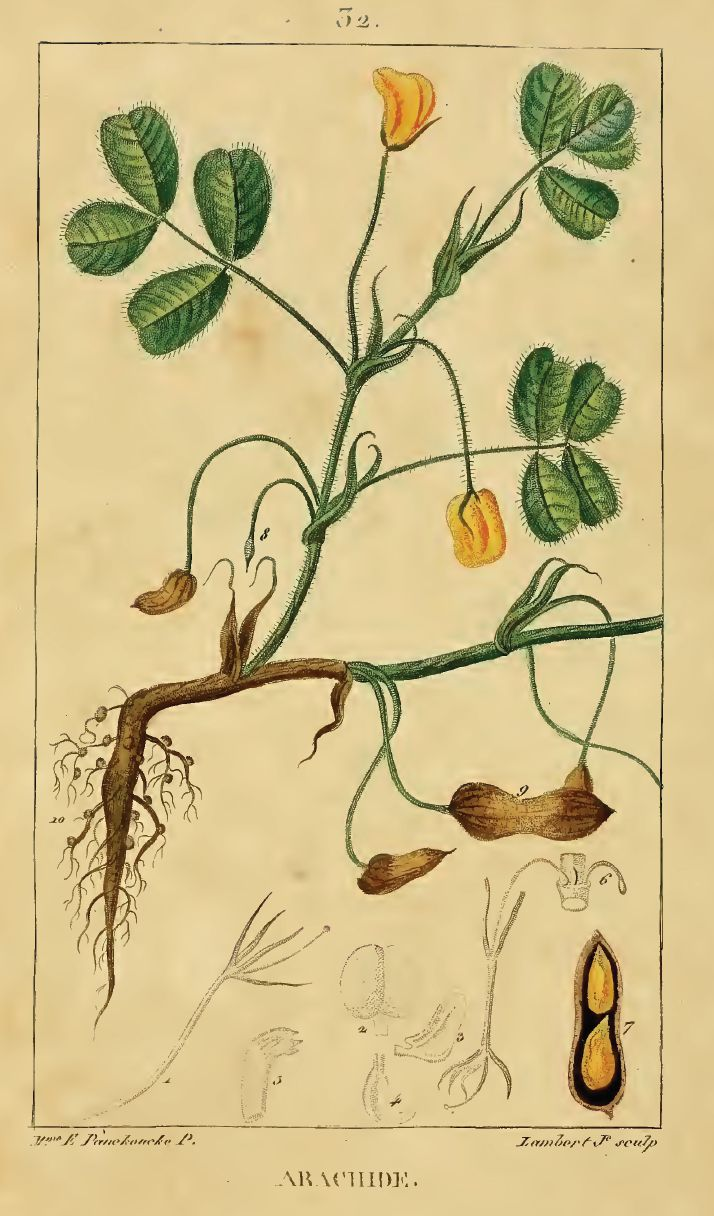
Arachis hypogaea

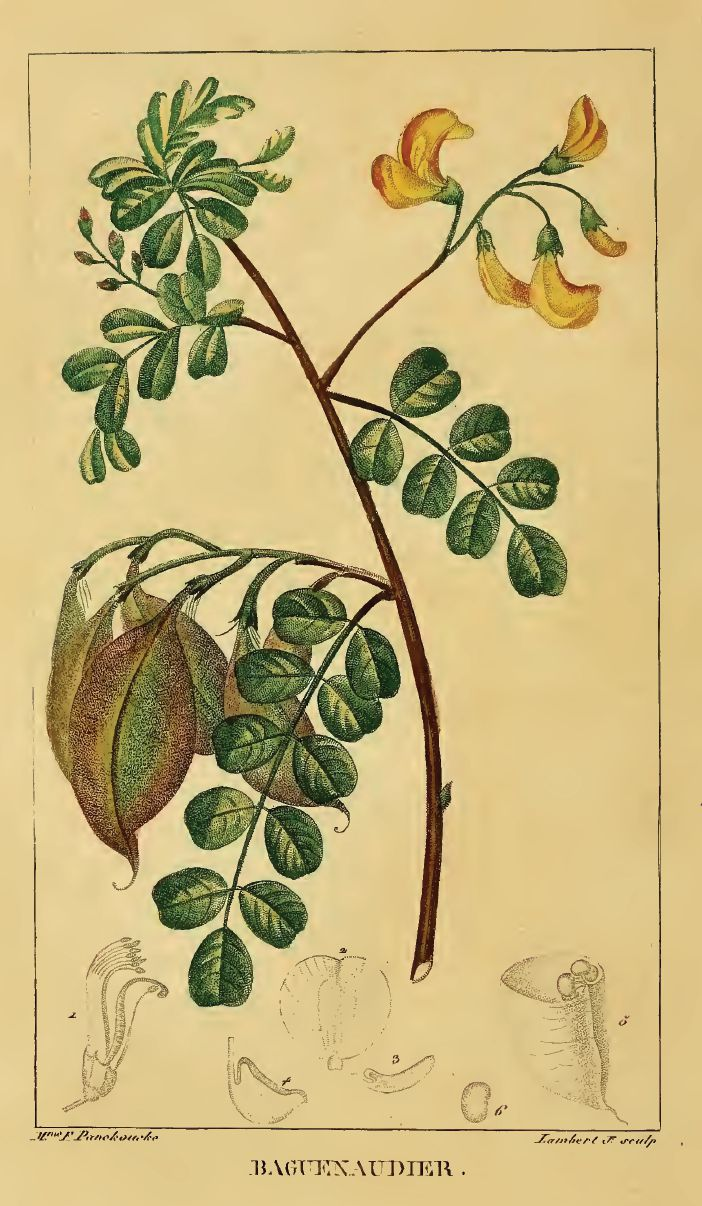
Colutea arborescens

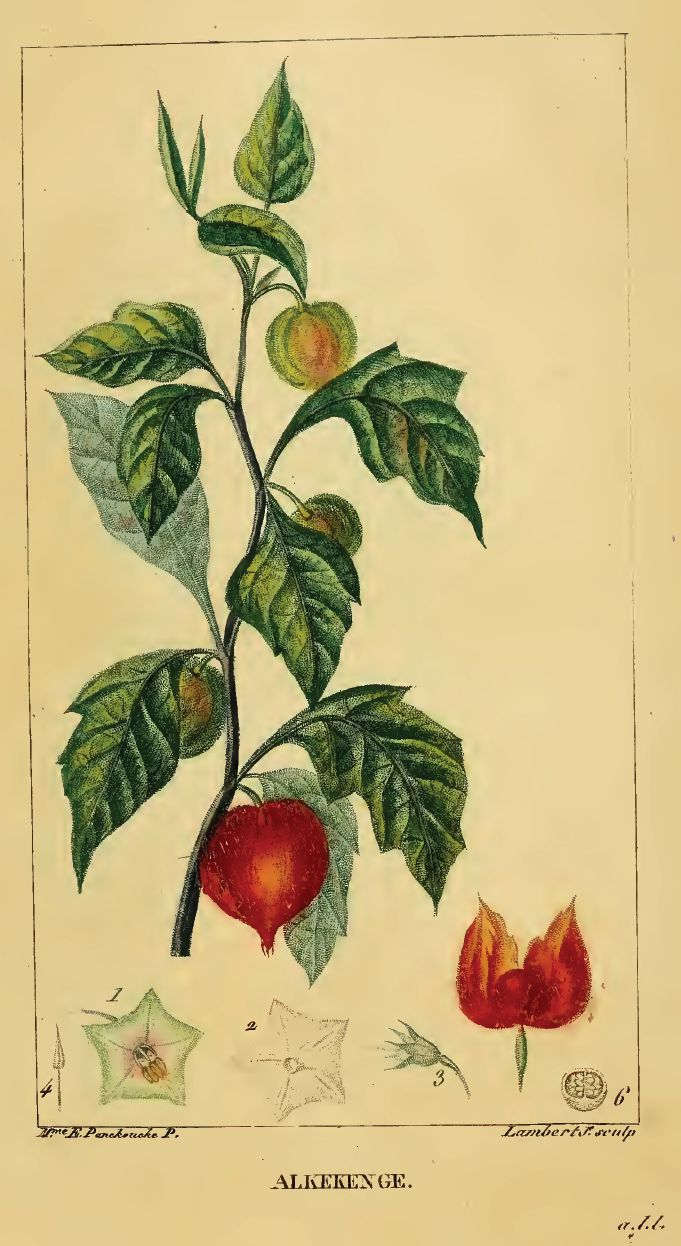
Physalis alkekengi
