= Carlos Luis de Ribera y Fieve =

Spanish painter

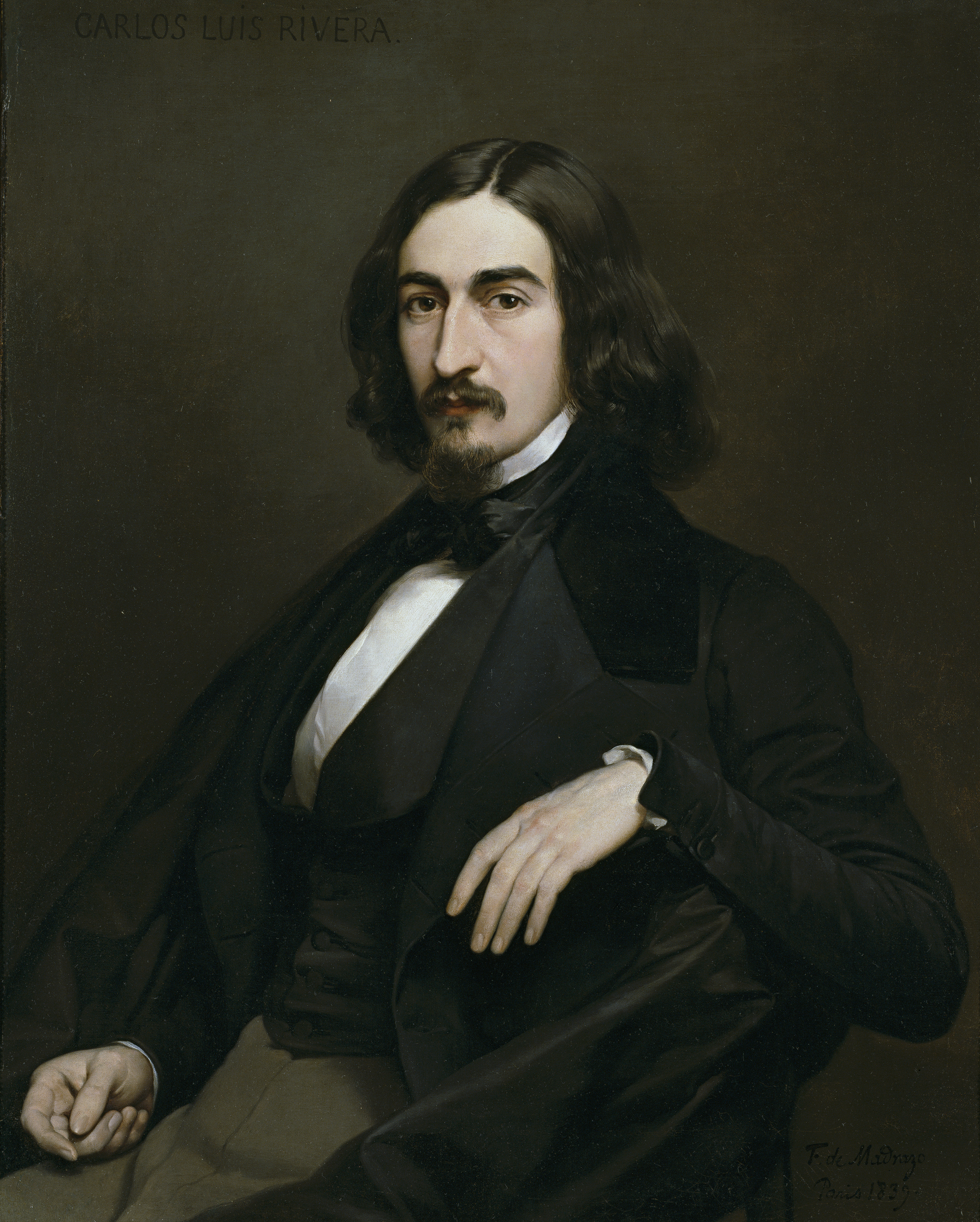
Portrait of Carlos Luis de Ribera y Fieve, by Federico de Madrazo

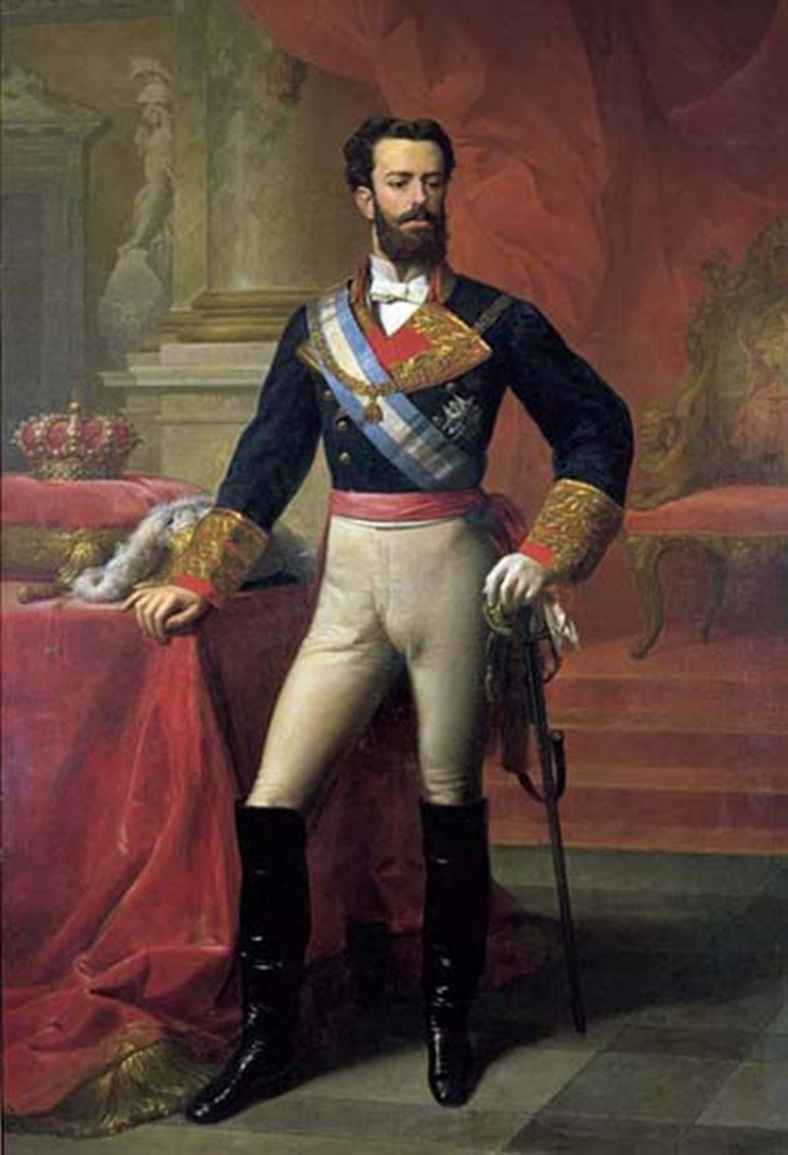
Amadeo I of Spain, depicted wearing the uniform of a captain general and wearing the collar of the Order of the Golden Fleece by Carlos Luis de Ribera y Fieve, Bank of Spain

Carlos Luis de Ribera y Fieve (1815, Rome – April 14, 1891, Madrid) was a Spanish painter, son of Juan Antonio Ribera.

== Early life and education ==
Baptismal godparents were the former king King Charles IV and Maria Luisa of Parma. Carlos Luis studied at the Royal Academy of Fine Arts of San Fernando. His talent was recognized at the age of fifteen in 1830, when he won first prize in the Academy's contest for his portrait painting Vasco Núñez de Balboa. He also received a pension, which allowed him to pursue his higher studies in Rome and Paris. There, he studied under the French painter Paul Delaroche.

Luis de Ribera's time at the Academy of San Fernando was an influential period in his life as a painter. During that time he was regular at the gatherings of Romantic thinkers in Madrid. He was one of the most active people in the foundation of the review El artista and contributed a large number of lithographs to it. He also studied art in Paris, which was something all aspiring artists did in those days. He spent nine years in Paris, working for a majority of that period in the studio of Paul Delaroche. It was Delaroche who motivated de Ribera to work on historical paintings.

== Royal Academy ==
In 1845, on March 23 he was appointed lecturer at the Royal Academy. Based on their merits he was granted with the Cross of the Order of Charles III on December 15, 1860. He was awarded with the Grand Cross of the Order of Isabella the Catholic on August 27, 1870. For years, since 1878, Ribera participated as a jury member of the Royal Academy. He served as court painter to Queen Isabella II of Spain, and was later appointed to Minister of Public Instruction and Director of the Academy of San Fernando.

== Works ==
He cultivated historical themes with pictures as Don Rodrigo Calderon Gallows Road and The Taking of Granada by the Catholic Monarchs and the religious such as The Conversion of St. Paul, The Assumption of the Virgin. He decorated the interior of the Palace of the Parliament (1850) and the church of San Francisco el Grande Basilica.

== Exhibitions ==
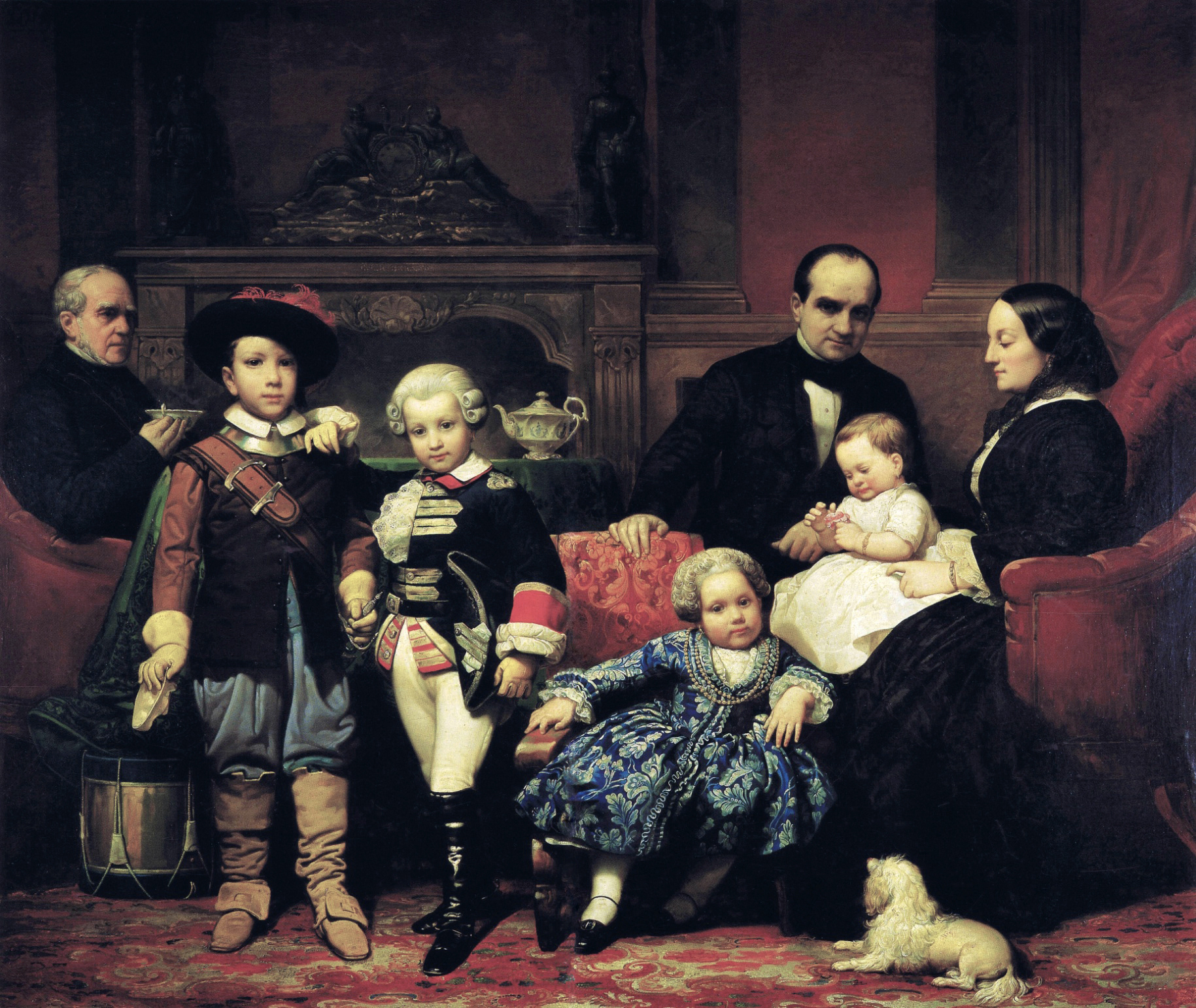
Family of Don Gregorio Lopez Mollinedo by Carlos Luis, private collection, 1854

Luis de Ribera exhibited his works most frequently in Paris. It was his city of choice for exhibitions between 1839 and 1855. He also exhibited regularly at the Royal Academy of Fine Arts of San Fernando and the Artistic and Literary Liceo.

== Designs and Illustrations ==
Luis de Ribera also had a successful, albeit minor, career as a designer and illustrator. His designed and provided illustrations for several of the periodicals of the time, such as The Artist and Journal of Home Culture and that of the Spanish Museum of Antiquities.
