= Antonio Fargas y Soler =

Spanish music critic (1813–1888)

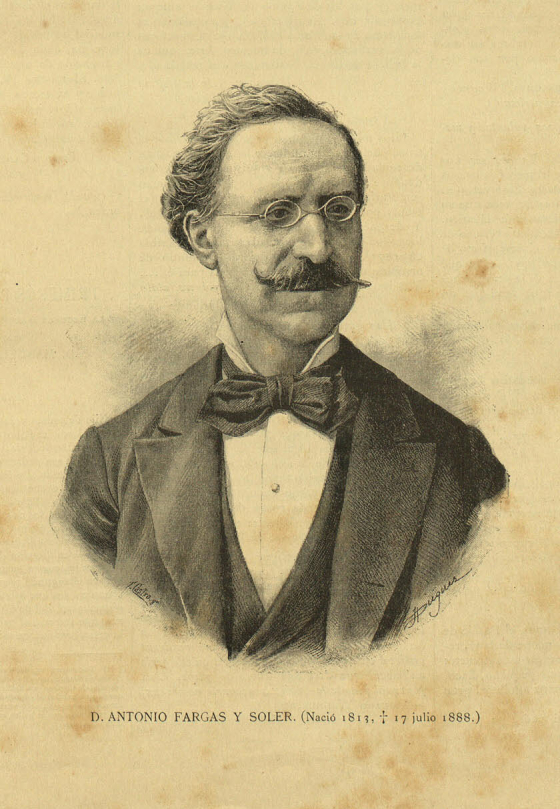
- Antonio Fargas y Soler
- Born: October 26, 1813; Palma de Mallorca, Spain
- Died: July 17, 1888 (aged 74); Barcelona, Spain
- Occupation(s): Composer, music critic

Antonio Fargas y Soler (Palma de Mallorca, 1813 - Barcelona, 1888) was a Spanish music critic.

== Life ==
Of Catalan parents, he was born in Palma de Mallorca on October 26, 1813, and at the age of one, he moved to Barcelona. He learned music in the convent of the Mercedarian religious order and dedicated himself to the study of music criticism. He was one of the founders of the artistic literary societies called "La Filomática" and "La Literaria," in which he read several memoirs on the history of music.

He collaborated in magazines such as El Museo de las Familias, El Arte, Revista de Cataluña, and España Musical, among others, in which he published biographical articles of famous musicians and criticism. In May 1845, he joined the editorial staff of the Diario de Barcelona, taking charge of the music criticism section, a position he held until his death on July 17, 1888 in Barcelona.

He reportedly left unpublished works such as a Compendium of the History of Music, a Lyrical Dictionary, the Annals of opera in the Teatro de la Santa Cruz and Liceu theaters of Barcelona, and the Supplement to the Biography of the Most Distinguished Musicians of All Countries.

== Works ==
- Diccionario de música, con explicación y definición de voces técnicas é instrumentos de música.—Barcelona, 1852.
- Biografías de los músicos más distinguidos de todos los paises, publicadas por «La España Musical».—Barcelona, Juan Oliveras, editor. 1866. Three volumes.

== Bibliography ==
- Elías de Molins, Antonio (1889). Diccionario biográfico y bibliográfico de escritores y artistas catalanes del siglo XIX (in Spanish). Barcelona: Hijos de J. Espasa.
