= Juan Antonio Ribera =

Spanish painter (1779–1860)

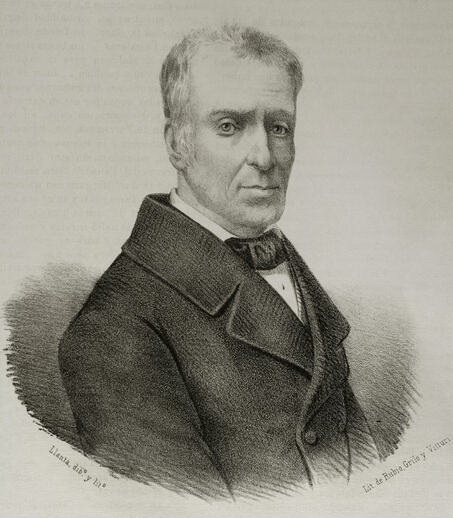
Juan Antonio Ribera, 1866.

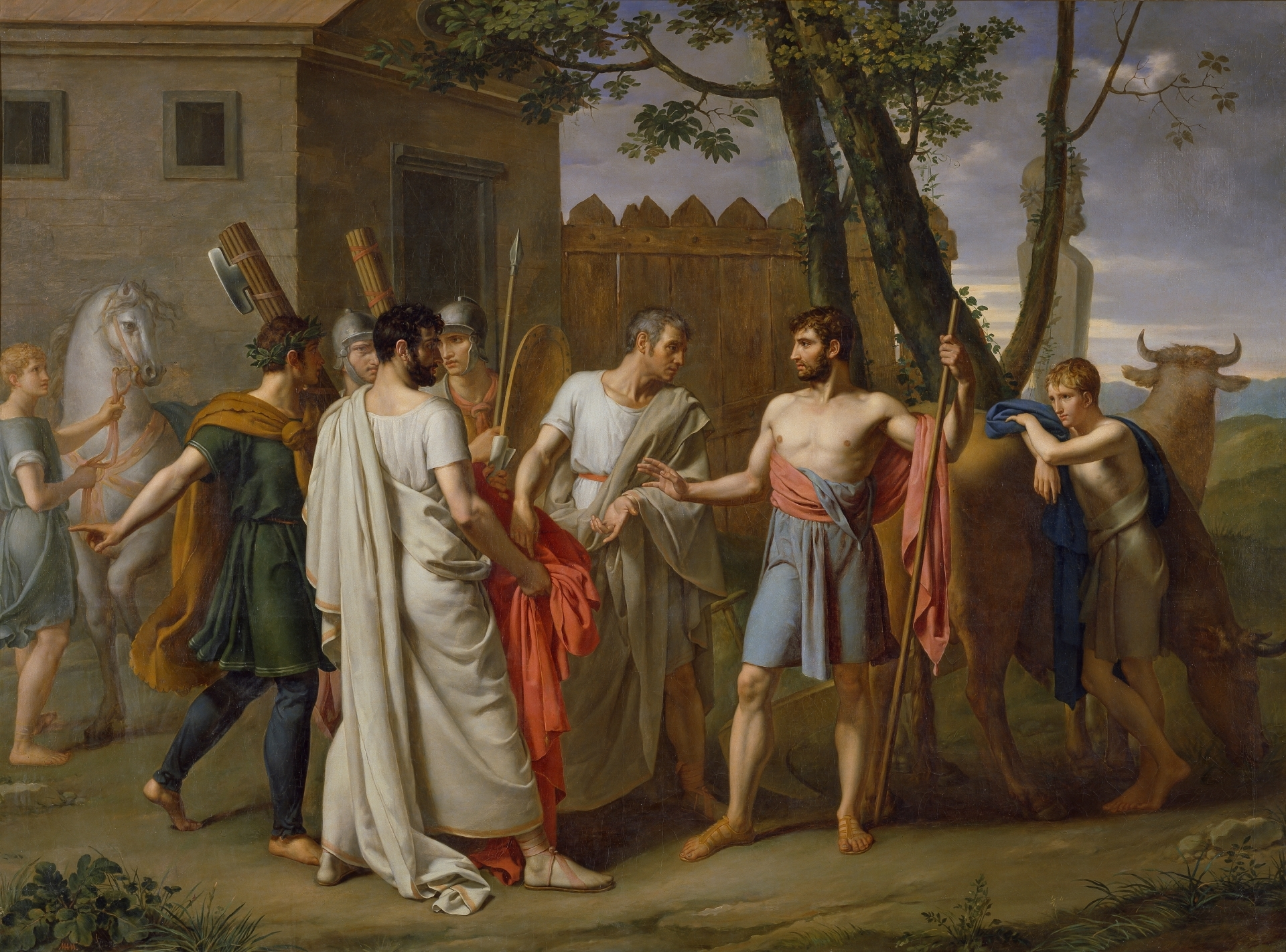
Cincinnatus leaving the plow to make laws in Rome by Juan Antonio Ribera, Museo del Prado, 1806)

Juan Antonio Ribera Fernandez (also known as Juan Antonio de Ribera; May 27, 1779 – June 15, 1860) was a Spanish painter.

== Early life and career ==
Ribera was born in Madrid, was a student of Francisco Bayeu y Subías, and probably had on occasion met with Francisco Goya. He participated in 1802 in the annual competition of the Real Academia de Bellas Artes de San Fernando with a copy of Raphael's Pasmo de Sicilia. He won a prize that allowed him to be awarded a scholarship in Paris. There he worked in the studio of Jacques-Louis David, where he produced his notable Cincinnatus leaving the plow to make laws to Rome.

== Exile ==
He went into exile during the Peninsular War. In 1811, Ribera was appointed court painter by the exiled Charles IV of Spain, whom he accompanied to Rome, where he was appointed a member of the Accademia di San Luca. After King Ferdinand VII of Spain returned to Spain, Ribera was later confirmed as court painter in 1816, although he remained in Rome until 1818 painting works he had already been commissioned for.

== Museo del Prado ==
In 1820 Vicente López y Portaña established the Museo del Prado. Ribera's tenure as director of the same organization began in 1857, replacing José de Madrazo y Agudo. In his term the Museum published the fifth catalog of works (1858), in force until the publication of the sixth in 1872. In 1857 he was appointed First Court Painter by Isabel II of Spain. He died in Madrid on June 15, 1860.

== Legacy ==
Despite his short work, Ribera is considered one of the characteristic representatives of Neoclassicism in Spain, together with José de Madrazo y Agudo and José Aparicio. He was also an important teacher and directed the Museo del Prado between 1857 and 1860, succeeded by Federico de Madrazo. He was the father of the painter Carlos Luis de Ribera y Fieve.
