= Antoine Fontaney =

French writer

- Born: 1803
- Died: June 11, 1837; Former 10th arrondissement of Paris
- Occupations: Writer, journalist, poet
- Movement: Romanticism

Antoine-Étienne Fontaney, born in 1803 and died on June 11, 1837, in Paris, was a French Romantic writer, journalist, and poet.

== Life ==
Employed in the civil registry office in Upie, Drôme, he frequented the literary circles of Charles Nodier and Victor Hugo and became friends with Sainte-Beuve. In 1829, he published his first collection of verses, Ballades, mélodies et poésies diverses (Ballads, Melodies and Various Poems), which included translations of Wordsworth, Byron, and Thomas Moore. He took part in the July Revolution of 1830, then accompanied the Duke of Harcourt, who had just been appointed French ambassador to Spain, to Madrid. Back in Paris, he contributed a series of articles to the Revue des deux Mondes (Review of the Two Worlds), later collected under the title Scènes de la vie castillane et andalouse (Scenes of Castilian and Andalusian Life), which he signed with the name Lord Feeling in memory of the Scottish novelist Henry Mackenzie. He also wrote a column of literary criticism and contributed short stories to Le Livre des Cent-et-Un (The Book of the One Hundred and One) published by the bookseller Ladvocat.

Around 1833, he fell in love with Gabrielle Dorval, daughter of the actress Marie Dorval, who opposed their relationship and threatened to send her daughter to a convent. The two lovers then took refuge in Spain, and then in England. In London, Fontaney dedicated himself to writing articles on English political, artistic, and literary life, articles he signed with a new pseudonym, O'Donnor, and which François Buloz published in the Revue des deux Mondes. The young couple lived in poverty. Afflicted by consumption (tuberculosis), Gabrielle, who was only 21 years old, returned to die in Paris on April 1, 1837, followed by Antoine, who died of the same illness just a few weeks later, at the age of 34. Victor Hugo and Sainte-Beuve put aside their recent quarrel and both attended his burial in the Montparnasse Cemetery.

Antoine Fontaney left behind a Journal intime (Intimate Journal) which, published in 1925, constitutes an interesting document on the early years of the July Monarchy and on the minor history of Romanticism.

== Works ==
- Ballades, mélodies et poésies diverses, 1829
- Scènes de la vie castillane et andalouse, 1835
- Journal intime, publié avec une introduction et des notes par René Jasinski, Paris, Les Presses françaises, 1925

== Bibliography ==
- Asse, Eugène (1900). Les petits romantiques (in French).
