= Portrait of William Peel =

Painting by John Lucas

- Artist: John Lucas
- Year: 1860
- Type: Oil on canvas, portrait painting
- Dimensions: 272 cm × 178 cm (107 in × 70 in)
- Location: National Maritime Museum; London

Portrait of William Peel is an 1860 portrait painting by the British artist John Lucas. It depicts the Royal Navy officer Captain William Peel. Peel, the son of the former British Prime Minister Robert Peel, was noted for his service during the Victorian era. He served ashore as part of the Naval Brigade in the Crimean War and fought at the Battle of Inkerman. During the Siege of Sevastopol his gallantry won him the Victoria Cross. Again serving ashore during the Indian Mutiny in 1857 he played a role in the Relief of Lucknow where he was badly wounded. He died of smallpox at Cawnpore in 1858 at the age of 33. The painting was commissioned posthumously by public subscription, and celebrated his role at Lucknow. He is shown at full-length in a captain's frock coat, sword in hand. to his left is a soldier of the 53rd Foot while to his right a gun crew of sailors load an artillery piece. It was originally hung in the Painted Hall of Greenwich Hospital. Today the painting is part of the collection of the National Maritime Museum in Greenwich. A mezzotint was produced based on the painting by James John Chant.

== See also ==
- Portrait of Julia, Lady Peel by Thomas Lawrence, an 1827 depiction of Peel's mother

== Bibliography ==
- Bell, David Winton. The Martial Face: The Military Portrait in Britain, 1760-1900. Brown University, 1991.
- Harrington, Peter. British Artists and War: The Face of Battle in Paintings and Prints, 1700-1914. Greenhill Books, 1993.
