= List of guitarists by genre =

This is a list of notable guitarists, organized by genre.

== American primitive ==
Robbie Basho
John Fahey
Leo Kottke
Peter Lang

== Blues ==
=== Early 20th century blues (pre WWII - 1950s) ===
Blind Blake
Big Bill Broonzy
Blind Boy Fuller
Son House
Skip James
Blind Lemon Jefferson
Robert Johnson
Eddie Jones (Guitar Slim)
Huddie Ledbetter (Lead Belly)
Charley Patton
Tampa Red
Bukka White

=== Blues from the 1960s to present ===
Luther Allison
Duane Allman
Etta Baker
Jeff Beck
Mike Bloomfield
Joe Bonamassa
David Bromberg
Roy Buchanan
Eric Clapton
Albert Collins
Ry Cooder
Robert Cray
Steve 'The Colonel' Cropper
Bo Diddley
Ronnie Earl
Robben Ford
Jesse Fuller
Lowell Fulson
Rory Gallagher
Eelco Gelling
Peter Green
Buddy Guy
GP Hall
Chuck Hammer
Jimi Hendrix
Warren Haynes
John Lee Hooker
Mississippi John Hurt
Tony Iommi
Elmore James
Skip James
Blind Lemon Jefferson
Lonnie Johnson
Luther "Guitar Junior" Johnson
Jorma Kaukonen
Albert King
B. B. King
Freddie King
Sonny Landreth
J. B. Lenoir
Mance Lipscomb
Lonnie Mack
Taj Mahal
John Mayer
Mississippi Fred McDowell
Brownie McGhee
Blind Willie McTell
Little Milton
Memphis Minnie
Gary Moore
Keb' Mo'
Big Bill Morganfield
Matt "Guitar" Murphy
Jimmy Page
Pappo
Charlie Patton
Bonnie Raitt
Tampa Red
Jimmy Reed
Kelly Richey
Duke Robillard
Robert Ross
Otis Rush
Todd Sharpville
Kenny Wayne Shepherd
Jimmy Thackery
Jimmy Scott
Hubert Sumlin
Sister Rosetta Tharpe
Walter Trout
Derek Trucks
Stevie Ray Vaughan
Yavuz Çetin
Jimmie Vaughan
Joe Louis Walker
T-Bone Walker
Muddy Waters
Gerry Joe Weise
Bukka White
Jack White
Josh White
Johnny Winter
Howlin' Wolf

== Country and gospel ==
Chet Atkins
Junior Brown
Glen Campbell
Maybelle Carter
Roy Clark
Buddy Emmons
Lester Flatt
Danny Gatton
John Hartford
Joe Maphis
Grady Martin
Roger Miller
Buck Owens
Les Paul
Jerry Reed
Roy Rogers
Mel Tillis
Merle Travis
Doc Watson
Speedy West
Hank Williams

== Experimental ==
Derek Bailey
Blixa Bargeld
Syd Barret
Jeff Beck
Glenn Branca
Peter Buck
Rhys Chatham
Nels Cline
Loren Mazzacane Connors
Robert Fripp
Bill Frisell
Fred Frith
Roopam Garg
Kim Gordon
Keiji Haino
GP Hall
Chuck Hammer
Christian Hejnal
Scott Henderson
Josh Homme
Henry Kaiser
Yuri Landman
Thurston Moore
KK Null
Mike Oldfield
Paul Panhuysen
Lee Ranaldo
Lou Reed
Marc Ribot
Omar Rodríguez-López
Keith Rowe
Jim O'Rourke
Elliott Sharp
Gary Smith

== Flamenco ==
Vicente Amigo
Charo
Moraíto Chico
Miguel de la Bastide
Oscar Herrero: composer, teacher and musician
Paco de Lucía (1947-2014)
Luis Maravilla
Juan Martín
Carlos Montoya
Ramón Montoya (1880-1949)
Gerardo Núñez (1961-)
Paco Peña (1942-)
Manitas de Plata
Niño Ricardo
Sabicas (1912-1990)
Juan Serrano (born 1934)
Paco Serrano (born 1964)
Manolo Sanlúcar
Tomatito (born 1958)

== Fingerstyle (contemporary) ==
William Ackerman
Michael Hedges
Bert Jansch
Adrian Legg
John Renbourn
Sungha Jung
Tommy Emmanuel
James Blackshaw

== Folk (pop) ==
Joan Baez
David Bromberg
Ry Cooder
Jim Croce
John Denver
Ani DiFranco
Nick Drake
Bob Dylan
Arlo Guthrie
Jewel
Jorma Kaukonen
Ellen McIlwaine
Joni Mitchell
Tom Paxton
Shawn Phillips
Paul Simon (Simon and Garfunkel)
Paul Stookey
James Taylor
Happy Traum
Mason Williams
Peter Yarrow

== Folk (traditional) ==
Joan Baez
Norman Blake
Creed Bratton
Dan Ar Braz
Peter Buck
Martin Carthy
Allen Collins
Elizabeth Cotten
Rev. Gary Davis
Tommy Emmanuel
Leslie Fish
Gordon Giltrap
Davey Graham
Dallas Green
David Grier
Stefan Grossman
Woody Guthrie
GP Hall
Nick Harper
Roy Harper
Nic Jones
François Luambo Makiadi "Franco"
John Martyn
Tony McManus
Paul McSherry
Al Perkins
Stochelo Rosenberg
Tony Rice
Pete Seeger
Dick Siegel
Elliott Smith
Ivan Smirnov
Richard Thompson
Leon Wesley Walls
Don Ross
Happy Traum
Jason Wilber
Peter Yarrow

== Latin-American music ==
Manuel Barrueco (Cuban)
Leo Brouwer (Cuban)
Luiz Bonfá (Brazilian)
Abel Carlevaro (Uruguayan)
Oscar Castro-Neves (Brazilian)
Alirio Díaz (Venezuelan)
Egberto Gismonti (Brazilian)
Guinga (Brazilian)
João Gilberto (Brazilian)
Antonio Carlos Jobim (bossa nova)
Antonio Lauro (Venezuelan)
Gentil Montaña (Colombian)
Baden Powell de Aquino (Brazilian)
Rodrigo Riera (Venezuelan)
Antony Santos (Dominican)
Super Uba (Dominican)
Toquinho (Brazilian)
Luis Vargas (Dominican)
Atahualpa Yupanqui (Argentine)
Rafael Rabello (Brazilian)
Paulinho Nogueira (Brazilian)
Sebastião Tapajós (Brazilian)
Yamandu Costa (Brazilian)
Agustin Barrios (Paraguayan)
Astor Piazzolla (Argentine)

== Ragtime ==
Duck Baker
Blind Blake
Rev. Gary Davis
Peter Finger
Stefan Grossman
Jorma Kaukonen
David Laibman
Woody Mann
Blind Willie McTell
Eric Schoenberg
Happy Traum
Blind Willie Walker
Sylvester Weaver

== See also ==
- List of guitarists
- Guitar
- Classical guitar
- Electric guitar
