= Dana Bourgeois =

Master luthier and acoustics voicing expert

- Born: 1953 (age 72–73); Westbrook, Maine
- Education: Bowdoin College
- Occupation: Luthier
- Website: bourgeoisguitars.com

Dana Bourgeois (born 1953) is a luthier, writer, lecturer and is considered one of the United States' top acoustic guitar makers. Bourgeois's innovations in design and voicing techniques have earned him worldwide acclaim for his acoustic guitars from professional players, hobbyists and collectors alike. Some notable musicians playing Bourgeois guitars include Luke Bryan, Ricky Skaggs, Bryan Smith, Ry Cooder, Scott Fore, Bryan Sutton, Vince Gill, Lee Roy Parnell, James Taylor and Guy Clark.

== Background ==
Dana Bourgeois was born and raised in Westbrook, Maine. As a child, his interest in guitars developed after seeing The Beatles on the Ed Sullivan Show in 1964.

Bourgeois attended Bowdoin College, where he studied art history, and graduated in 1975.

While at college, Bourgeois read a book called Classic Guitar Construction by Irving Sloane, whose method in the book was, purportedly, "totally impossible." After that, Bourgeois, working from his room on campus and using a machine shop owned by his grandfather, made a guitar of his own. His father helped with the wood working.

Bourgeois opened a shop repairing guitars in Brunswick, Maine in 1976 and continued honing his craft as a luthier. He also worked at the Bowdoin College Museum of Art.

By the late 1970s to 1980s Bourgeois worked in collaboration with Eric Schoenberg and Martin Guitars to design and build an OM style Guitar.

== Schoenberg Guitars ==
In 1986, Bourgeois teamed up with guitarist Eric Schoenberg and established Schoenberg Guitars. The company manufactured flattop acoustic guitars. Bourgeois stayed with the company several years.

== Bourgeois Guitars ==
Bourgeois started his own company, Bourgeois Guitars, which opened in 1993 and was located at Roy Continental Mill in Lewiston, Maine. His use of premium materials, such as Brazilian rosewood, Adirondack Spruce and Indian Rosewood, as well as his ability to "voice" his instruments earned Bourgeois a reputation within the music world as an expert luthier. Using a tapping method, he fine tunes individual pieces at key times throughout the manufacturing process. This high-quality sound distinguished Bourgeois from other luthiers and began attracting the attention of top musicians.

In 1996, Bryan Sutton, then guitarist in Ricky Skaggs' band, purchased a Bourgeois guitar in a Nashville music store. A year later, at the Thomas Point Beach Bluegrass Festival in Brunswick, ME, Sutton contacted Bourgeois to set up a meeting. "This guy calls me and says he's playing in Maine," Bourgeois told Ray Routhier of the Portland Press Herald, "so I figure it could be anybody. But then he says he plays with Ricky Skaggs." The meeting resulted in an endorsement deal, a collaboration with Skaggs', to make and sell the Ricky Skaggs Signature Model and Ricky Skaggs Country Boy Model guitars.

"At a casual glance, making guitars seems glamorous, but really we're just making sawdust," Bourgeois said, "But when we build one for a famous person, it's something everyone gets excited about."

In 1999, Bourgeois signed a distribution deal with Akai, a Japanese music and electronics company. With 16 employees and the prospect of growing his business internationally, Bourgeois expected to grow his business further. For a time, Akai marketed the Bourgeois Artisan Series guitars: the DR-A dreadnought and JR-A jumbo orchestra model. Along with the two guitars for international distribution, Bourgeois also made Martin Simpson and Ricky Skaggs signature guitars, though in limited editions. However, the distributor stopped ordering new guitars, leaving Bourgeois without the backing necessary to meet operating expenses. Despite attempts to find new investors and to sell directly to his customers online, Bourgeois was forced to liquidate the business, filing bankruptcy and auctioning off the guitar-making equipment.

== Pantheon Guitars ==
After Bourgeois Guitars closed its doors, guitar hobbyist, collector and investment banker Patrick Theimer approached Bourgeois with another business venture. With Theimer, three other investors, and Bourgeois, who would oversee guitar production, Pantheon Guitars was formed in 2000. The business model employed at Pantheon allowed Bourgeois to focus on making the guitars he was known for while sharing marketing and manufacturing resources with other independent luthiers. Bourgeois continues to offer custom-designed guitars, including the BK/Slope D, which earned an Editor's Pick Award from Guitar Player Magazine. Among Bourgeois' current offerings are also guitars (his Aged Tone Series) made with a wood-aging process called torrefaction. While not "vintage", these guitars tend to replicate the look and sound of quality of instruments that are older, more "broken in". He commemorated the building of his 5,000th guitar with the Bourgeois Victoria that was described in an Acoustic Guitar Magazine article as a "one-of-a-kind, sub-parlor-size custom 12-fret instrument inspired by American guitars made during the Victorian era (1837-1901), matched with a period-style wooden 'coffin' case."

He also spends time training luthiers to carry on the trade.

== Eastman Partnership ==
In October 2019, Dana announced via the Bourgeois website that Bourgeois Guitars "has entered into a strategic partnership with Eastman Music."

"In a nutshell, I have simply traded my former partners for Eastman. Moving forward, I will retain an ownership interest in Bourgeois Guitars and will remain as CEO. Our entire team will continue to produce acoustic guitars of the highest quality in our Lewiston, Maine, workshop. US distribution will continue to be handled through our Lewiston office. Eventually, overseas distribution will be managed by Eastman."

== Festivals, memberships, awards ==
- Member of the Guild of American Luthiers
- Grand prize winners of the New England Flatpicking and Banjo Championships held at the Ossipee Valley Bluegrass Festival in South Hiram, Maine have been awarded Bourgeois guitars and banjos.
- Editor's Pick Award for the Bourgeois BK/Slope D guitar

== Select articles ==
- Tapping Tonewoods: How the selection of species helps define the sound of your guitar (Acoustic Guitar Magazine, March/April 1994)
- Finishing Touches (Guitar Player, December 2004)
- Play It Again! How Bryan Sutton's legendary "Banjo Killer" dreadnought was restored after being damaged by the Nashville flood of 2010. (Acoustic Guitar, March 2013)
