= Nûdem Durak =

Kurdish singer

Nûdem Durak is a Kurdish singer, folk musician and political prisoner from Turkey. In 2015 she was arrested and sentenced to ten and a half years in prison for singing Kurdish political songs, regarded as evidence of "being a member of a terrorist organization".

== Life ==
Durak began to sing about the age of 12, and bought her first guitar by selling her mother's wedding ring. She worked as a music teacher in the town of Cizre in South East Turkey at the Mem u Zin Cultural Centre. She was first arrested in 2009, and spent several months in jail waiting for trial. After that trial she was released pending trial. On 22 April 2012 she was arrested again, but in 2015 the Turkish Supreme Court approved her punishment, resulting in her re-arrest and imprisonment. Durak was sentenced to ten and a half years in jail for 'terrorist propaganda', due to the political nature of her music. Durak told Al-Jazeera before her imprisonment that “Singing in Kurdish is my heritage from my ancestors… my only crime is making art.” In July 2016, Durak's prison sentence was increased from 10.5 to 19 years, with no additional charges brought against her. She is held in Type E Closed Prison in Mardin, Turkey. She is due for release in 2034. She has complained of torture, isolation, and having her guitar broken by prison officers.

== Reception ==
For her release several prominent artists voiced support. Peter Gabriel equated Duraks actions to the ones other musicians like him do as well. In November 2016, as part of Peter Gabriel's Voice Project, Pussy Riot's Nadya Tolokonnikova highlighted Nûdem Durak's situation as someone 'imprisoned for art'. In 2020, an international campaign calling for her release was started by Angela Davis, Noam Chomsky, Ken Loach, David Graeber, Peter Gabriel and Roger Waters, among other well known cultural figures. Roger Waters sent his autographed Martin acoustic guitar of the Us + Them Tour on a journey across Europe during which several well known artists like Noel Gallagher of Oasis, Mark Knopfler of the Dire Straits or Marianne Faithfull also signed the guitar before reaching Durak in prison Bayburt.
