= Johann Georg Stauffer =

Austrian luthier (1778–1853)

Johann Georg Stauffer (also Johann Georg Staufer; 26 January 1778 in Vienna – 24 January 1853) was an Austrian luthier and the most important Viennese luthier of his time.

== Life ==
Stauffer was born in the Viennese suburb of Weißgerber, the son of Mathias Stauffer, a labourer from Weyregg am Attersee. He studied under the luthier Franz Geissenhof. In June 1800 he took the Vienna oath of citizenship and in May 1802 he married Josepha Fischer in the Schottenkirche, Vienna. He took over the workshop of Ignaz Christian Bartl. Initially he built instruments modeled after the Italian guitar masters Giovanni Battista Fabricatore and Gaetano Vinaccia, he then developed several variants, typical of his own guitar style (see section Instruments).

In 1813/14, he applied for the vacant position of Court Luthier ("Hofgeigenmacher") but Johann Martin Stoss was preferred. From 1830 to 1836 Stauffer was also active as a music publisher. He devoted more time to his inventions, which is probably the reason for the beginning of his serious financial problems. In 1829 he made representations to the City Council for an advance of 1,000 guilders. In 1831/32 his financial troubles continued and he was finally arrested for debt. He then worked temporarily in the workshop of his son Johann Anton Stauffer, before settling for a short time in Košice (now in Slovakia). The last period of his life Stauffer spent in Vienna's St. Marx citizens care home, where he could continue to work in a small workshop on his ideas for the guitar and other instruments. There he developed several guitars with completely new concepts (such as guitars with an oval body and double back), which were always labeled "According to the latest acoustic improvement of Johann Georg Stauffer manufactured in Vienna, Landstrasse 572". In 1853 he finally died impoverished, of paralysis of the lungs.

Johann Georg Stauffer had three sons:

- the pianist Franz Stauffer (25 March 1803 - after 1846).
- the luthier and pianist Johann Anton Stauffer (12 June 1805 - 28 October 1871), who took over his father's workshop in 1833, but from 1836 onwards built under his own name.
- Alois Stauffer (7 June 1806 - 23 June 1806)

== Instruments ==
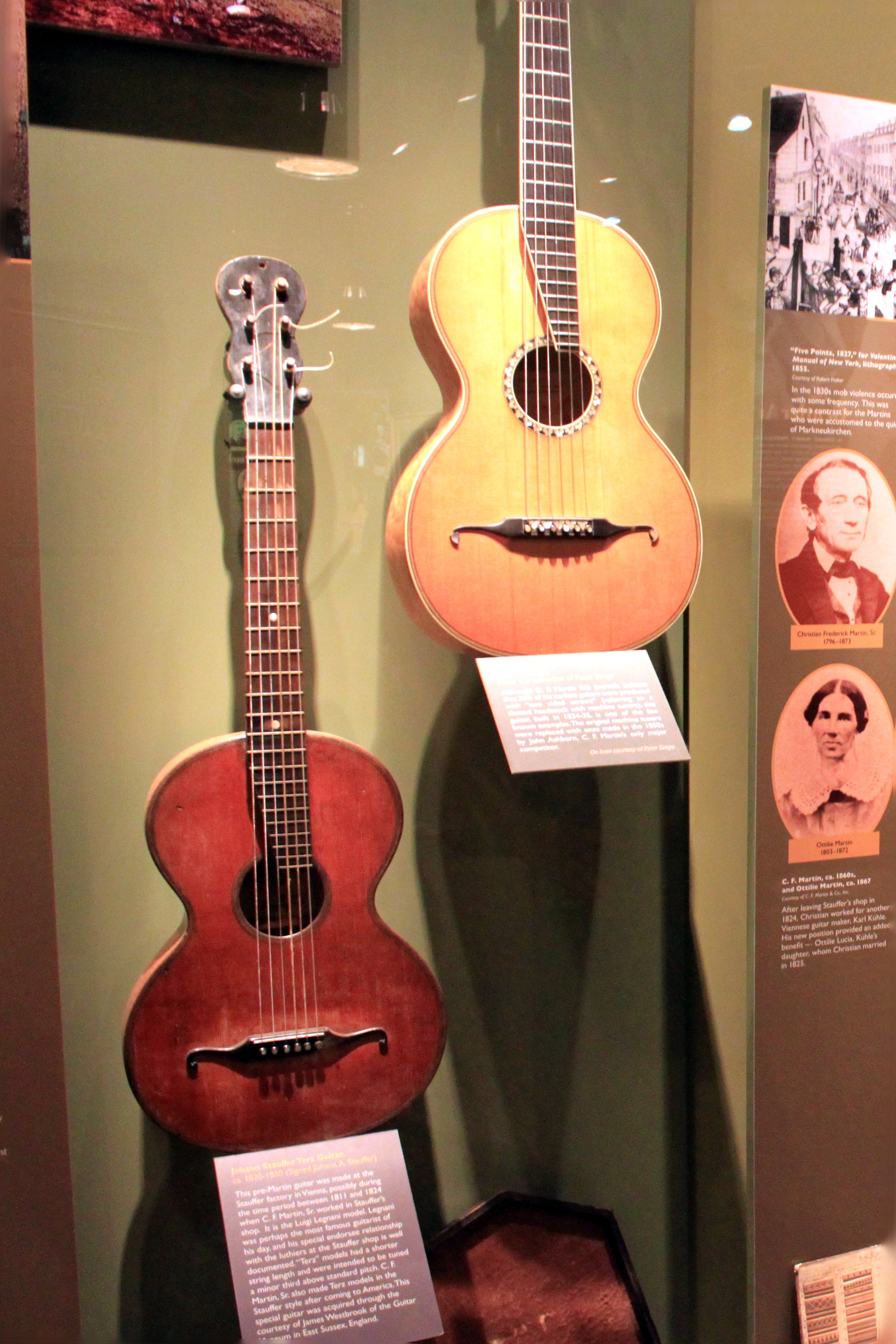
left: Johann Georg Stauffer Terz Guitar (c. 1820-30) right: Vienna Stauffer-style guitar by Christian Frederick Martin (1834–35)

The "Viennese guitar" as built by Johann Georg Stauffer is a gut string guitar with a curved back, narrower waist and bridge pins. In 1822 Stauffer and Johann Ertl received an imperial commission for improvement of the guitar, focusing on the extension of the fingerboard, above (not attached to) the soundboard, the development of machine heads and the use of embedded metal frets.

By 1825/30, the instruments usually had a headstock in a figure eight shape (similar in shape to the guitar's body). In 1825 Stauffer invented the machine heads named after him: a metal plate with an asymmetrical "scroll" headstock, machine heads with worm gears mounted on the plate, arranged in a single line on the upper side of the head stock (six-in-line). This "Stauffer" headstock and design was reproduced by his son Anton, and copied by many luthiers in the 19th century. The asymmetrical headstock is variously referred to as being shaped like a "scroll" (a violin scroll in profile), a "snail", and a "Persian slipper". The Stauffer-style scroll headstock and tuning machines have been in use since the 19th century and continue to be used on guitar-related instruments in Central Europe such as larger tamburica. As of 2018, Stauffer style tuning machines are still made by some companies, and some luthiers continue to make “Viennese guitars”. The headstock design was also a big influence to the Fender Stratocaster in the 20th century.

In 1823 J. G. Stauffer built his Arpeggione, an instrument with characteristics of the guitar and the cello. Composer Franz Schubert (1797–1828), who also had a Stauffer guitar, wrote a sonata for the Arpeggione, an otherwise almost unnoticed instrument (see Sonata for Arpeggione and Piano in A minor (D 821)). Stauffer also built Terz guitars, the Contraguitar, and experimented with new forms of violin. The luthier Peter Teufelsdorfer, based in the Hungarian city of Pest was for some time in dispute with Stauffer over some of his inventions, which Teufelsdorfer said he had developed himself (but which may have been invented independently).

== Stauffer and CF Martin ==
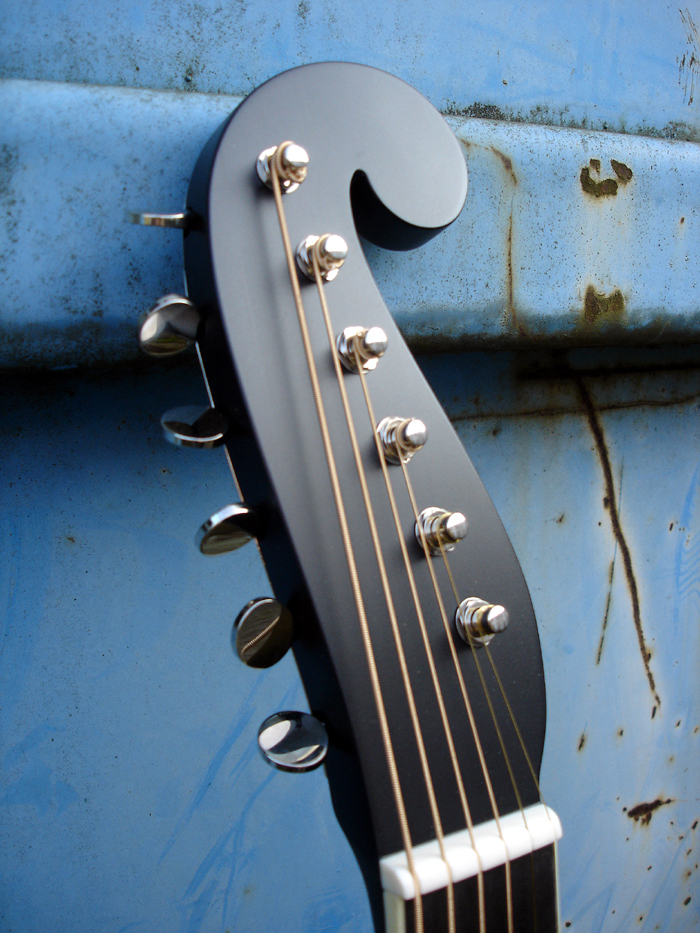
Martin 00 Stauffer 175th

Christian Frederick Martin, was born in 1796 in Markneukirchen, Germany, a centre for instrument making. Martin first studied with his father, Johann Georg Martin, a cabinet maker. At 15 years of age, he went to Vienna for an apprenticeship with Stauffer, and in 1825, Martin married Ottilie Kühle, the daughter of the Viennese harp maker Karl Kühle.

Martin remained in Vienna until at least 1827, after which he returned to his hometown and opened his own shop. After a long dispute with the guild of luthiers regarding the rights of cabinet makers to build guitars, Martin emigrated to the United States of America, where he introduced the mechanism developed by Stauffer and founded Martin Guitars. In 2008, the 175th anniversary of the Martin Company, the company released a tribute guitar: the "Martin 00 Stauffer 175th".

== Criticism ==
- Guitarist Wulfin Lieske has stated: "if you play a Stauffer guitar from Vienna, it doesn't have this dimension like a Torres... it's a 2-dimensional guitar."
