= Christian Frederick Martin =

German-American luthier (1796–1873)

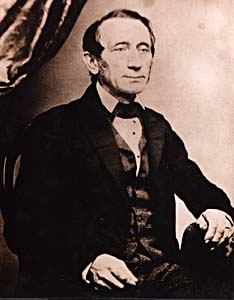
- Born: Christian Frederick Martin Sr. January 31, 1796; Markneukirchen, Electorate of Saxony, Holy Roman Empire
- Died: February 16, 1873 (aged 77); Nazareth, Pennsylvania, U.S.
- Occupation: Luthier

Christian Frederick Martin Sr. (German: Christian Friedrich Martin I.; January 31, 1796 – February 16, 1873) was a German-born American luthier who specialized in guitars and was the founder of C. F. Martin & Company. He made his first guitars in the United States in the 1830s.

== Early life and career ==
Born in Markneukirchen in the Electorate of Saxony to a family of cabinet makers, Martin became an apprentice of the guitar maker Johann Georg Stauffer of Vienna, Austria. Martin also became a foreman at Stauffer's workshop. Martin was the second of five children and was more commonly known as Friedrich, given the German custom of using the second given name. In Martin's case, four of the children's first given names are a derivation of Christian (Christiane, Christian, Christian and Christiana).

As a result of a dispute between the Cabinet Makers Guild, of which Martin was a member, and the Violin Makers Guild, Martin moved to the United States in 1833. The move occurred less than a year after his father Johann Georg Martin died, and, being the last alive of Johann Georg Martin's progeny, he would have been free to emigrate without ongoing familial obligations. On arriving in New York City, he set up shop at 196 Hudson Street on the Lower West Side. Martin's first workshop housed a small production setup in the back room, and a retail music store up front. This shop was the forerunner of C. F. Martin & Company, which is still family-owned and operated, with C.F. Martin's great-great-great-grandson C.F. Martin IV as CEO until 2021 and continuing as executive chairman.

At the insistence of his wife, Ottilia Kühle (daughter of the Maschinentischler [machine carpenter] and maker of pedal harps Karl Kühle in Vienna), Martin moved the guitar shop in 1838 to Nazareth, Pennsylvania where it is still located.

Martin's guitar construction and design innovations produced a model of flattop guitar that is still in use today.
