= David Laibman =

American Marxist economist (born 1942)

- Born: December 25, 1942 (age 83)
- Occupations: Professor; guitarist

Academic background
- Education: Antioch College (BA); Ruskin College, Oxford; The New School (PhD)
- Doctoral advisor: Edward J. Nell
- Other advisors: Adolph Lowe; Stephen Hymer

Academic work
- School or tradition: Marxist economics
- Institutions: Brooklyn College

David Laibman (born December 25, 1942) is an American economist and ragtime guitarist. He is a professor emeritus of economics at Brooklyn College and the Graduate Center of the City University of New York. He is the editor emeritus of Science & Society, a quarterly Marxist journal founded in 1936.

== Biography ==
Laibman attended Antioch College, Ohio, with a year of study at Ruskin College, Oxford, England. He earned his B.A. from Antioch in 1965; an M.A. in Economics from Brooklyn College, City University of New York, in 1969; and his Ph.D. in Economics from the Graduate Faculty of the New School for Social Research in New York, in 1973. His dissertation, The Invariance Condition for Value-Price Transformation in a Linear, Non-Decomposable Two-Sector Model, dealt with problems in Marxist value theory. Laibman teaches economic theory, political economy, and mathematical economics, at the undergraduate, masters, and doctoral levels at CUNY.

After submitting an article based on his dissertation to Science & Society in 1973, Laibman was invited to join the Editorial Board of the journal. He remained active in its work, becoming Editor in 1990 and Editor Emeritus in 2022.

Laibman’s research has focused on topics within Marxist economic and social theory. In Value, Technical Change and Crisis (1992), he described the role of abstract labor in uniting production and exchange relations, in both simple and capitalist market societies. The book also examined the quantitative relationship between value and price, especially in the capitalist context of profit-rate equalization, and presents a model of capital accumulation with technical change in an effort to add to the standard treatments of the tendency of the rate of profit to fall. Laibman’s 1997 book Capitalist Macrodynamics examines the Marxist theory of critical tendencies and crisis in capitalism.

From 1966 to 1986, Laibman was associated with the journal New World Review, which reported on the Soviet Union, Eastern Europe, China, Southeast Asia, and Cuba. Laibman’s interest in the 20th-century post-capitalist experiences informed his work on price formation, incentives, and planning in socialist economies. He developed a model of socialist economic planning, "Multilevel Democratic Iterative Coordination" (MDIC), in Science & Society and in several of his books, including Value, Technical Change and Crisis; Deep History (2007), Political Economy After Economics (2012), and Passion and Patience (2015).

Following his work on Marxian value theory and capitalist dynamics, Laibman turned toward historical materialism and theories of socialist planning. Deep History (2007) examines historical materialism, theories of human individuality, symbolic consciousness, labor, class, capitalism, and socialism. Political Economy After Economics (2012) addresses topics including Marxian value theory, technical change, competitive equilibrium, macroeconomics, and socialist institutions. Laibman argues that political economy should incorporate the quantitative methods and formal modeling used in contemporary economics. Passion and Patience (2015) is a collection of essays, many originally published in Science & Society, on historical materialism, political economy, capitalism, socialism, culture, ideology, and scientific methodology.

He is also a fingerstyle guitarist, especially its application to the ragtime music of the early twentieth century. With Eric Schoenberg, Laibman recorded The New Ragtime Guitar for Folkways Records in 1970. His solo album, Classical Ragtime Guitar, was released by Rounder Records in 1980. Laibman has worked with a variety of artists in the early folk world, using his advanced finger picking technique. One notable album is Way Out West by Scottish folk singer Alex Campbell, in 1963. Laibman is featured on the track "Orange Blossom Special" with Campbell. He issued a DVD, Guitar Artistry of David Laibman.

== Published works ==
Laibman is the author of five books:

- Value, Technical Change and Crisis: Explorations in Marxist Economic Theory (Armonk, New York: M. E. Sharpe,1992)
- Capitalist Macrodynamics: A Systematic Introduction (London: Macmillan,1997)
- Deep History: A Study in Social Evolution and Human Potential (Albany, New York: SUNY Press, 2007)
- Political Economy After Economics: Scientific Method and Radical Imagination (London: Routledge, 2012)
- Passion and Patience: Society, History, and Revolutionary Vision (New York: International Publishers, 2015)

== Discography ==
- The New Ragtime Guitar (1971) Blue Goose/Arch FS 3528
- Novelty Guitar Instrumentals* (1975) Stephen Grossman's Guitar Workshop SGGW134
- Classical Ragtime Guitar (1981) Rounder Records Rounder 3040
- Ragtime Guitar (1997) Easy Disc ED CD 7026
- Classic Folk Guitar (1998) Wooded Hill Recordings HILLCD23
- Guitar Artistry of David Laibman DVD (2007) Vestapol 13104DVD
- Adventures in Ragtime Guitar (2008) Stephen Grossman's Guitar Workshop SGGW113
- Contemporary Ragtime Guitar (2009) Stephen Grossman's Guitar Workshop SGGW121
