= GP Hall =

English musician

Graham Peter Hall, generally known as GP Hall (born 15 July 1943) is an English musician, composer and improviser.

== Early life ==
Hall was born in Hampton Hill, London.

== Musical style and techniques ==
He uses slide and fingerpicking techniques but also plays (or prepares) his guitars with various found implements such as crocodile clips, palette knives, velcro strips, an antique psaltery bow, wind-up toy cars and others in order to create a variety of different sounds and attacks.

Hall refers to one of his main playing approaches as "Industrial Sound-Sculpture". This involves creating a highly detailed and layered impressionistic sound piece by layering and/or looping guitar sounds and signals created by a variety of standard and non-standard methods. The sound-sculptures can be melodic, amelodic or both.

== History ==
=== 1960s and early 1970s - blues etc. ===
Raised in the East End of London, Hall was schooled in classical, flamenco and jazz playing and went on to develop his skills as a guitarist in the British blues boom of the late 1960s (he would also be inspired by the developing hard rock scene). As a teenager, he played in the Odd Lot Band and set up the Odd Lot Club as a venue for their music, which in turn attracted more established bands and players for concerts.

As he became better known, Hall went on to play at more celebrated London venues including The Roundhouse, the Middle Earth club and the 100 Club (where he was a resident player). He supported the likes of Deep Purple, The Hollies, and Chris Farlowe and played on stage with original American blues heroes John Lee Hooker and Sonny Boy Williamson.

=== 1970s - into the avant-garde ===
Hall's musical approaches began to broaden in the early 1970s. He spent some time living with Romani musicians (studying with renowned flamenco guitarist Manitas de Plata) and subsequently became involved in more avant-garde work, writing, producing and performing regularly at the British East/West Centre in London.

In 1972, Hall was commissioned by the South Hill Park Arts Centre in Bracknell to write The Estates - a "large and complex" musical piece intended to depict the breakdown of established communities to make way for the New Town of Bracknell. The piece was scored for a large ensemble centred on guitar, bass, clarinet, glockenspiel, hammer dulcimer, assorted percussions and two specially prepared piano frames. The Estates was recorded and released on album by Prototype Records in 1972. Originally an hour long, the recording was subsequently edited down to twenty-five minutes, and a version was released twenty-five years later on the Mar Del Plata album in 1997. Video footage also exists but has not been commercially released.

=== Mid-1970s to mid-1980s - wilderness years ===
At around this time, Hall's promising career was cut short by personal trauma. He describes it as having been "traumatised by a situation of events beyond my control... I was in the wrong place at the wrong time and the experience left me mentally, physically and spiritually bankrupt. As the trauma took hold, it took my confidence and self worth." He was driven to alcohol and to what he describes as "other escape mechanisms that took me to places I didn't want to go." Hall spent a fifteen-year period in personal and material decline. He suffered from depression and became homeless and destitute on several occasions until joining a recovery programme. During the 1980s he began to "communicate back into the real world via my music... at first it was a real hard slog. But as if to compensate, I had extraordinary insights. I am sober today and lead a relatively ordinary life and I really value that. I could not perform my music in any other way other than with a clear head, because it requires so much concentration. It was an isolated and lonely road, but I do appreciate the people who helped me in financial and supportive ways and gave me encouragement when I had many setbacks."

=== 1990s - renaissance ===
Hall's next solo album, Imaginary Seasons, arrived on his own Imaginary Music label in 1995. Having signed to the Future Music Recordings label, Hall delivered a further follow-up in 1996 - Figments of Imagination.

1997 saw the release of two GP Hall albums - Mar Del Plata (a similar album to Figments of Imagination, compiling both old and new tracks) and the live recording Marks on the Air.

== Discography (selected) ==
=== Albums ===
- The Estates (1972 Prototype Records)
- Manifestations (1975 Prototype Records)
- Colors (Movements) (1986, Kenwest)
- Imaginary Seasons (1995, River Flow Productions)
- Figments of Imagination (1996, Future Music Records)
- Mar Del Plata (1997, Future Music Records)
- Marks on the Air (1997, Esoteric Binaural Label) - live album
- Steel Storms (And Tender Spirits) (1998, Future Music Records) - double CD
- Each A Glimpse (And Gone Forever (1999, Esoteric Binaural Label) - mixture of studio and live tracks
- Industrial Blue (2002, Burning Shed) - compilation of "industrial" pieces
- Gothic Flamenco (2005, Bronze Records)
- Pyroclastic Flow (2010 Imaginary Music)
- Embarkation (2012 Clay Pipe Music)
- Spirits (2014, Bandcamp self-release)
- Palm Tree Ablaze (2015, Bandcamp self-release)
- Spatial Awareness (2018, Bandcamp self-release)
- Ships of the Desert (2018, Bandcamp self-release)
- Tender Mercies (2019, Bandcamp self-release)
- Be Strong (2019, Bandcamp self-release)

=== Singles/individual release tracks ===
- "The Lorca Train" (2014, Bandcamp self-release)
- "The Landing March 19, 2014, Bandcamp self-release)
- "Summer Lightning" (2014, Bandcamp self-release)
- "Into the Blue" (2014, Bandcamp self-release)
- "Bossy Boots" (2014, Bandcamp self-release)

==== (with Ant Sauchella ====
- "Raison d'être part 1 & 2" (2014, Bandcamp self-release)

==== (with Suvi & Phillip Allan ====
- "Key to My Heart" (2018, Bandcamp self-release)

=== Appearances on Various Artist compilations ===
- Colors (The Collection) (1986, Kenwest)
- Eclectic Guitars UP6 (Unknown Public)

=== DVDs ===
- Electric (2006, self-released)
- Guitarist (2006, self-released)

(The majority of GP Hall's catalogue has consisted of short-run release albums which have been deleted fairly quickly, meaning that many recordings of individual pieces have been re-released on subsequent recordings.)
