= C. F. Martin & Company =

American guitar manufacturer established in 1833

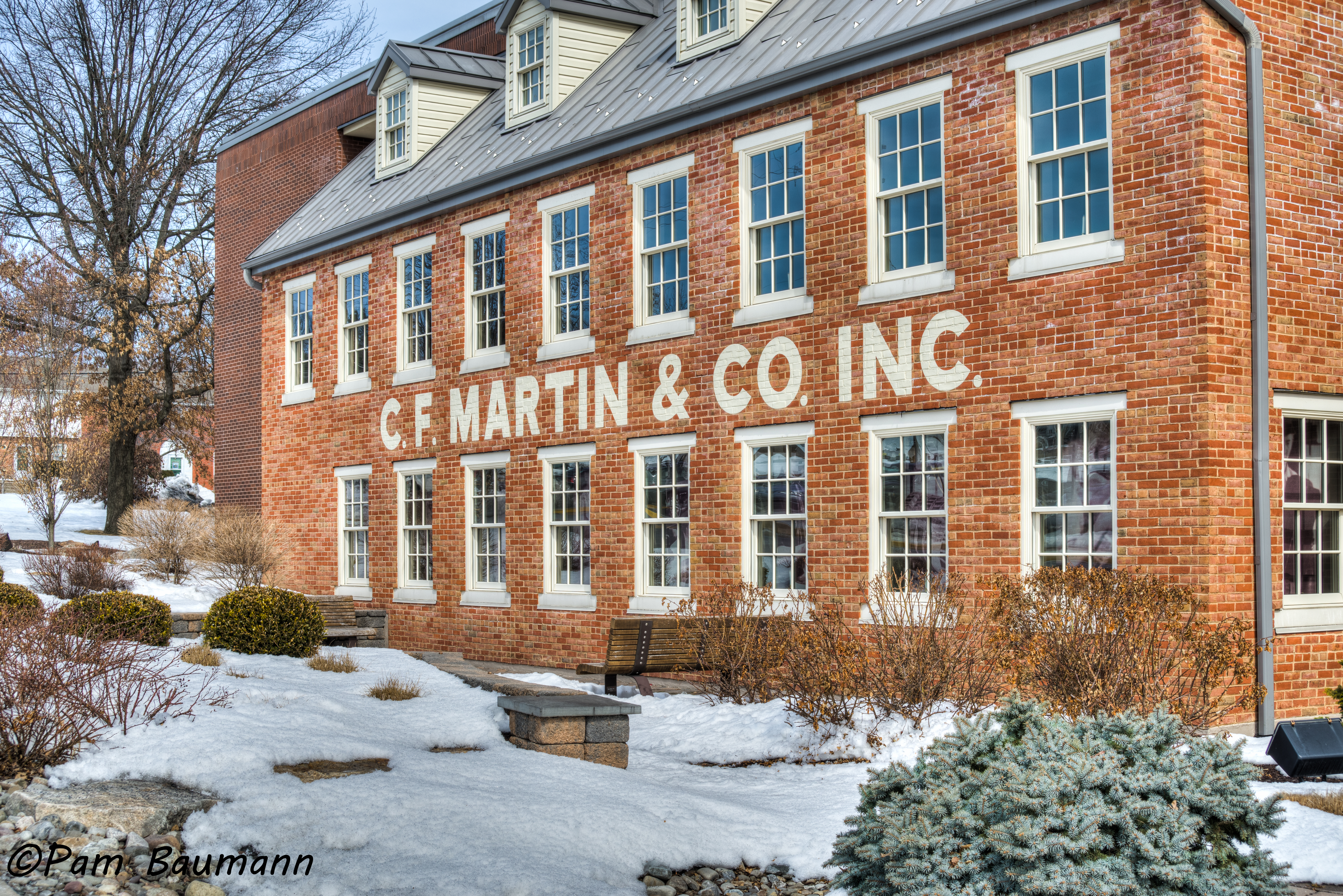
- C.F. Martin & Company in Nazareth, Pennsylvania
- Industry: Musical instruments
- Founded: 1833; 193 years ago in New York City; relocated to Nazareth, Pennsylvania in 1839
- Founder: Christian Frederick Martin
- Headquarters: Nazareth, Pennsylvania, United States
- Key people: Christian Frederick Martin IV (Executive Chairman); Thomas Ripsam (CEO)
- Products: acoustic and classical guitars, ukuleles, strings; formerly: electric guitars, tenor guitars, mandolins, tiples, basses
- Website: martinguitar.com

C.F. Martin & Company, often referred to as Martin, is an American guitar manufacturer established in 1833 by Christian Frederick Martin. Founded in New York City, it relocated to Nazareth, Pennsylvania, where it has remained since, in 1839. It is highly respected for its acoustic guitars and also manufactures ukuleles; the company has historically also made mandolins, tiples, electric guitars, and bass guitars.

The company's original factory on North Street in Nazareth was added to the National Register of Historic Places in 2018. The current Martin headquarters on Sycamore Street includes the Martin Guitar Museum, which features over 170 guitars made by the company over its history, and the factory can be toured by visitors.

The company also manufactures instruments and strings in Navojoa, Mexico. It produces approximately 193 guitars per day. Martin guitars have been used by some of the world's most prominent guitarists, including Johnny Cash, Elvis Presley, Bob Dylan, Hank Williams, Neil Young, John Lennon, Willie Nelson, the Kingston Trio, Kurt Cobain, Eric Clapton, and John Mayer.

== History ==
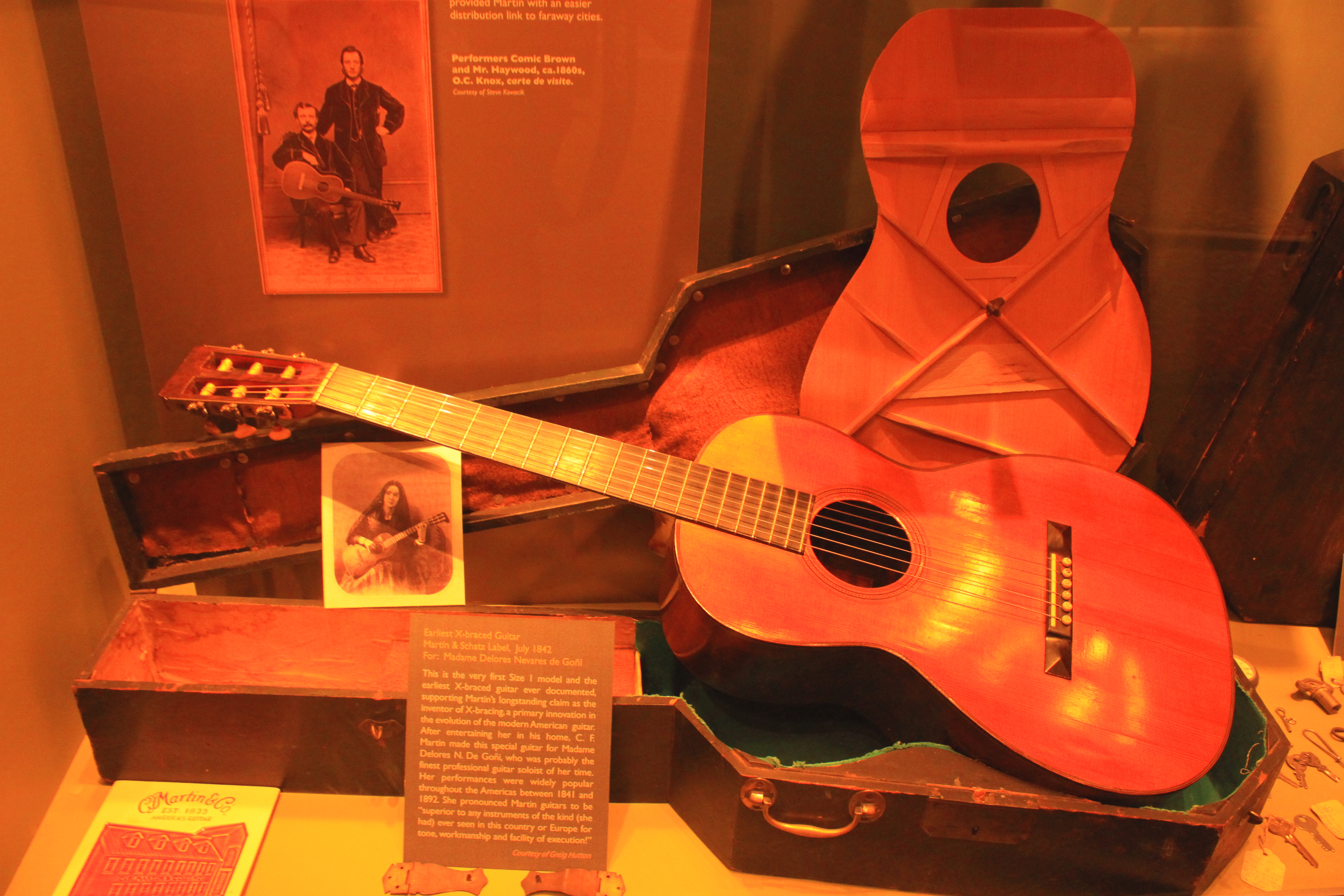
Earliest X-bracing on size 1 guitar by Martin & Schatz, manufactured by C.F. Martin & Company in July 1842

=== Founding ===
Guitar style transition of C. F. Martin in the early eras

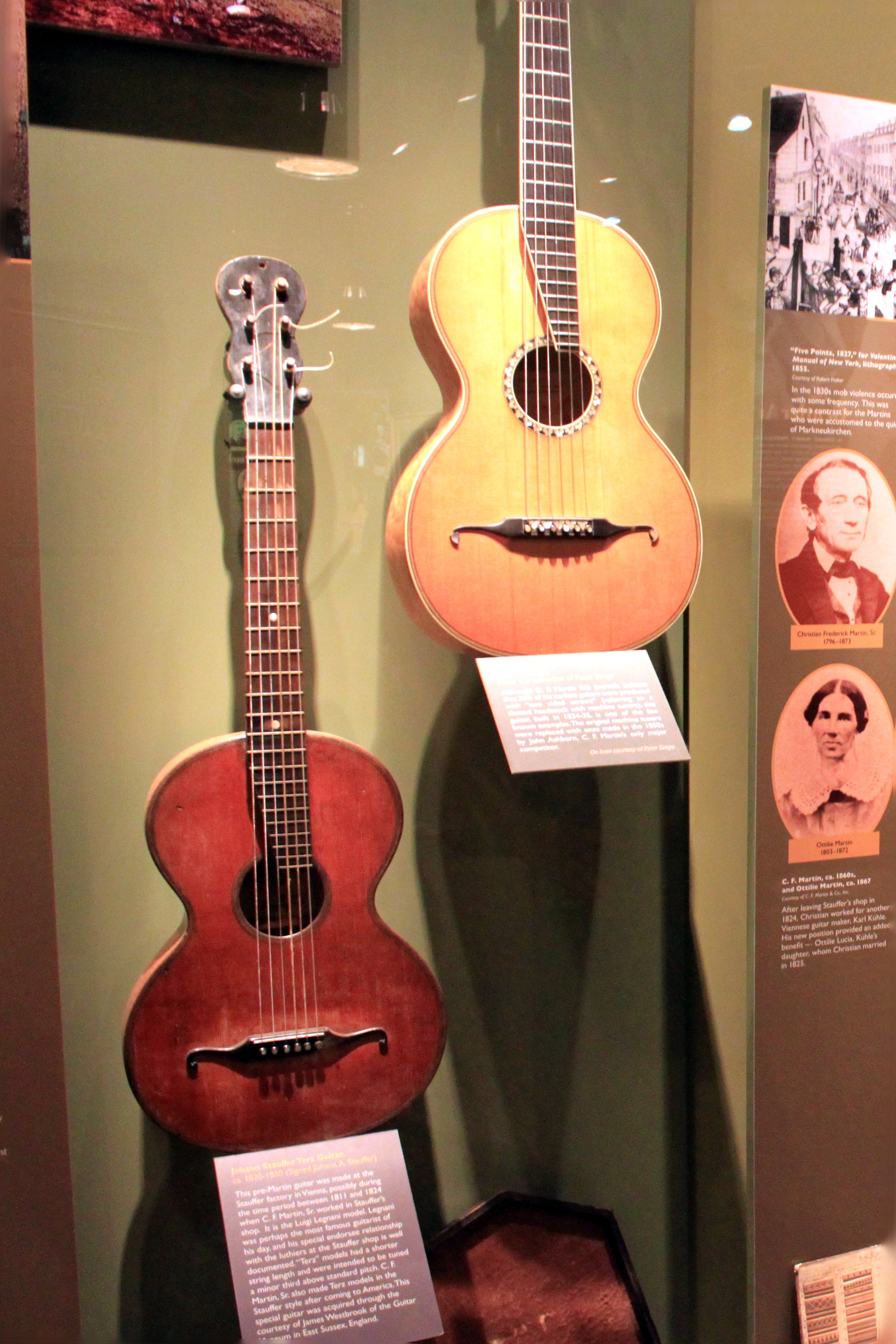
Vienna-era:
Johann Georg Stauffer Terz Guitar (c. 1820–30), and Vienna Stauffer-
style guitar by C.F. Martin (1834–35)

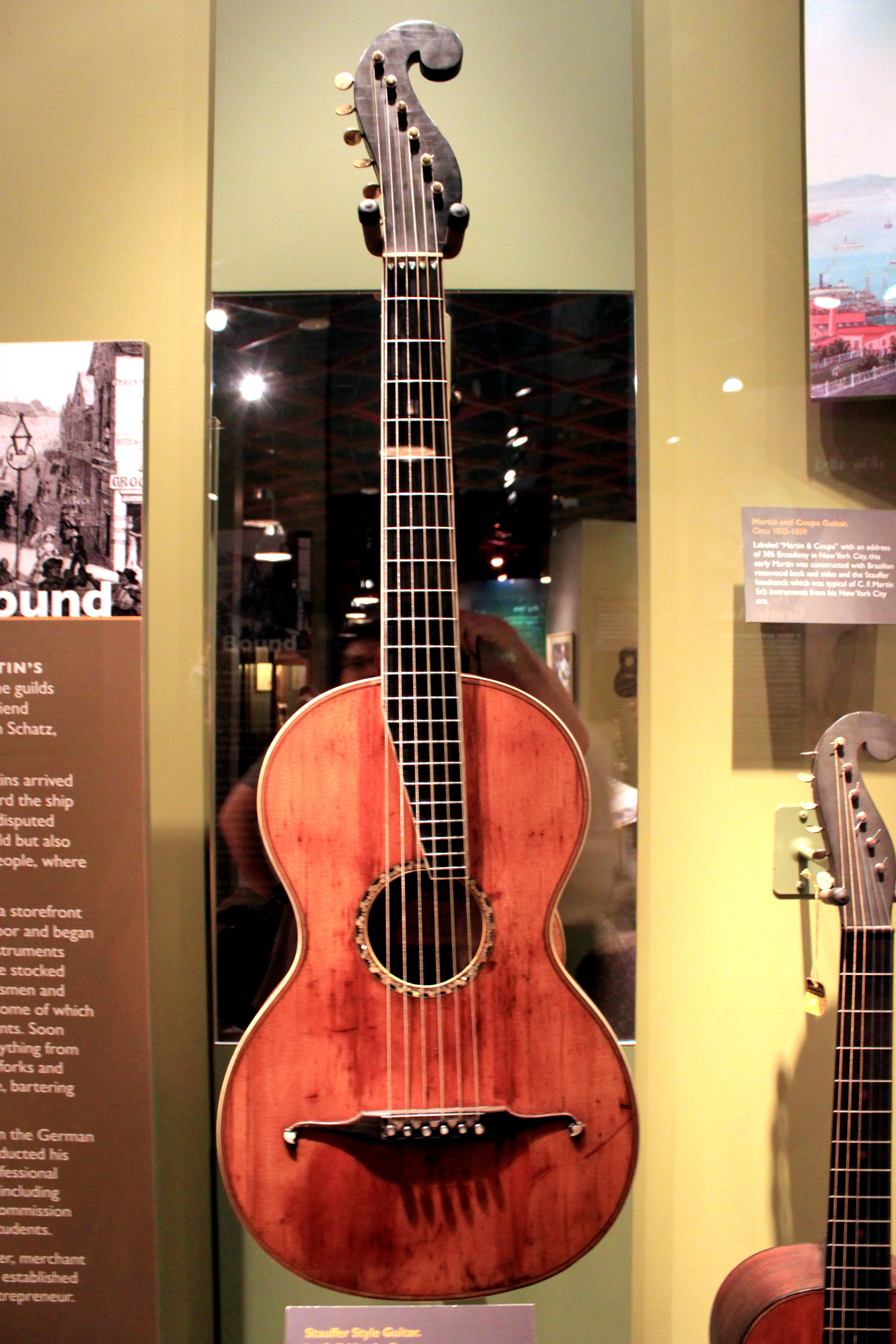
New York-era:
Stauffer-style guitar (c. 1834), made in New York

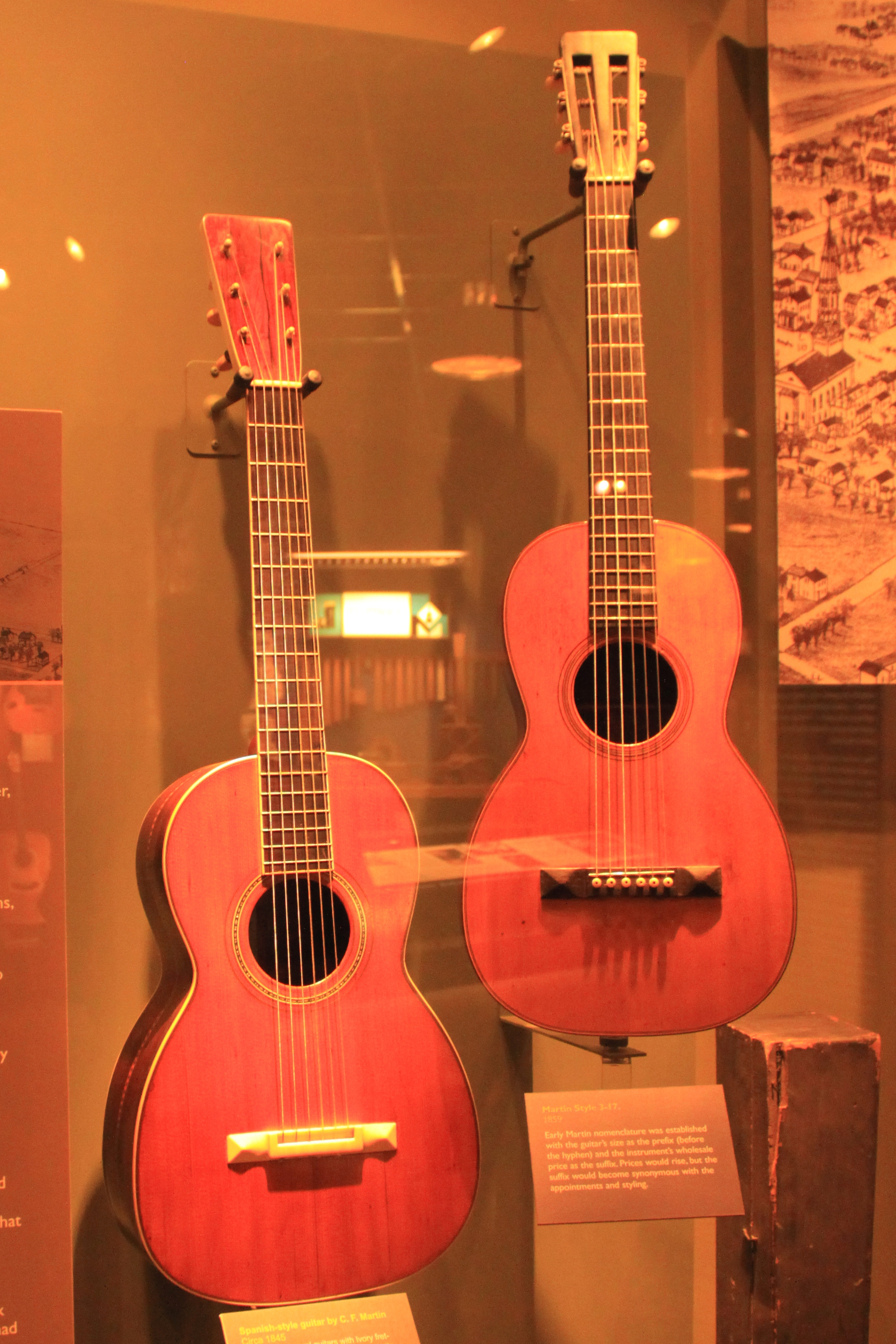
Nazareth-era:
Spanish-style guitar (c. 1845), and
Style 3-17 (c. 1859)

Christian Frederick Martin was born in 1796 in Markneukirchen, Saxony, a historic center of musical instrument manufacturing. He came from a long line of cabinet makers and woodworkers; his father, Johann Georg Martin, also built guitars. By the age of fifteen, C. F. Martin was an apprentice to Johann Georg Stauffer, a well-known guitar maker in Vienna. Martin returned to his hometown after completing training and opened his own guitar-making shop.

In the early 1800s, European craftsmen still operated under the guild system. The guitar was a relatively new instrument, and most guitar makers were members of the Cabinet Makers' Guild, but the Violin Makers' Guild claimed exclusive rights to manufacture musical instruments. In 1806 and on two subsequent occasions, the Violin Makers' Guild filed appeals to prevent cabinet makers from producing guitars. Johann Martin is mentioned in a surviving submission in 1832. Although the cabinet makers successfully defended their right to build guitars, C. F. Martin believed that the guild system was too restrictive and moved to New York City in 1833. Five years later, he moved the company to Nazareth, Pennsylvania, where it has remained since.

The company is generally credited with developing the X bracing system during the 1850s, although C. F. Martin did not apply for a patent on it. During the 1850s, X bracing was used by several makers, all of whom were German American immigrants who knew each other. According to historian Philip Gura, there is no evidence that C. F. Martin invented the system, but the company was the first to use it on a large scale.

Beginning in the 1860s, fan bracing became standard in Europe. Martin and other American builders including Washburn continued to use X-bracing instead. While some consider X-braced guitars less delicate sounding when strung with gut strings, this bracing method helped prepare the American guitar for steel strings, which emerged in the first quarter of the 20th century. From his cabinet making heritage, Martin carried over the dovetail joint to connect the neck of the guitar to its body. Some feel that this new technique contributed to the propagation of resonance from the guitar neck into the body. By 1921, Martin had focused production towards steel-string guitars in response to popular demand for louder instruments.

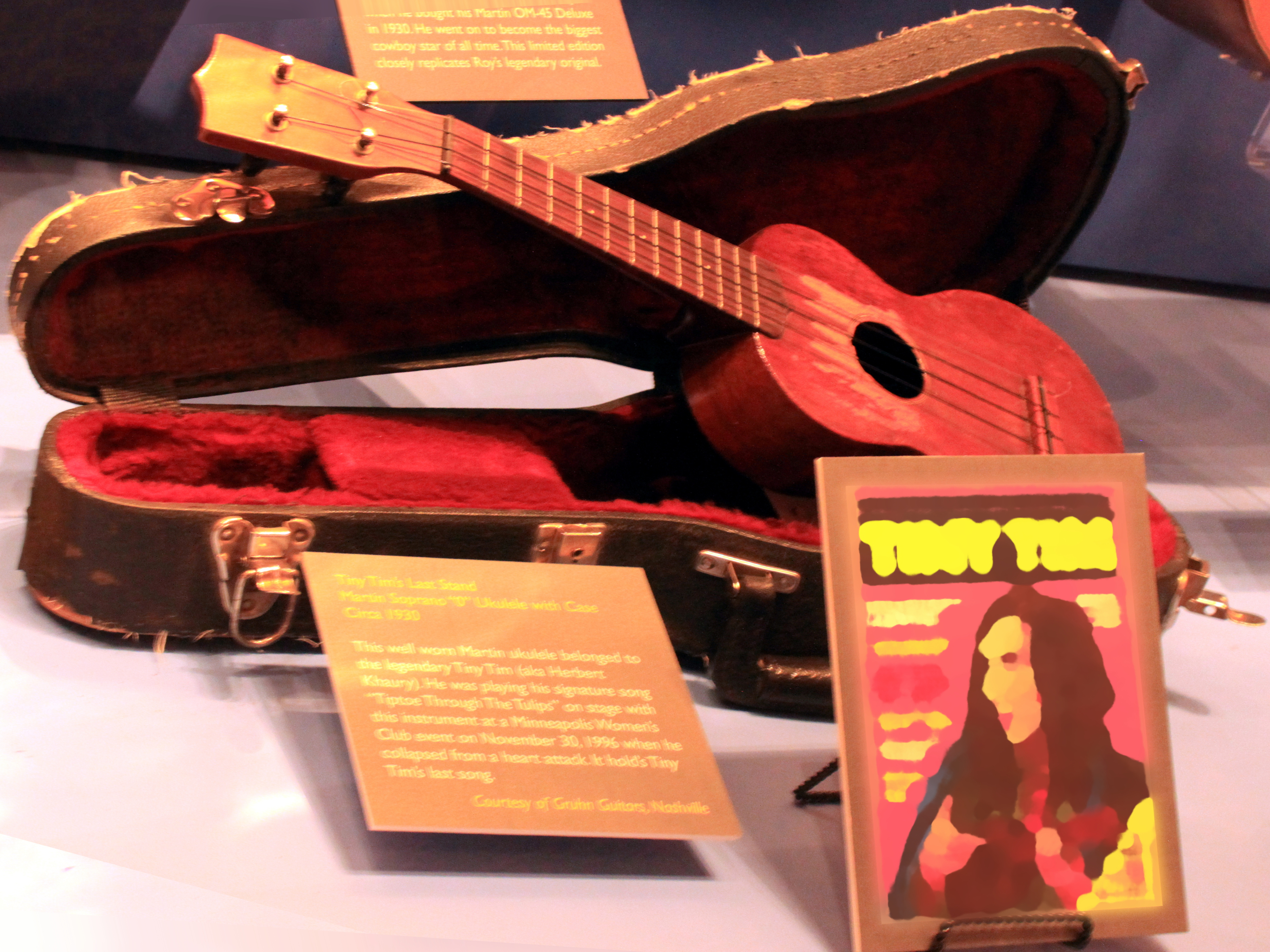
Martin Soprano Ukulele Style 0, played by Tiny Tim

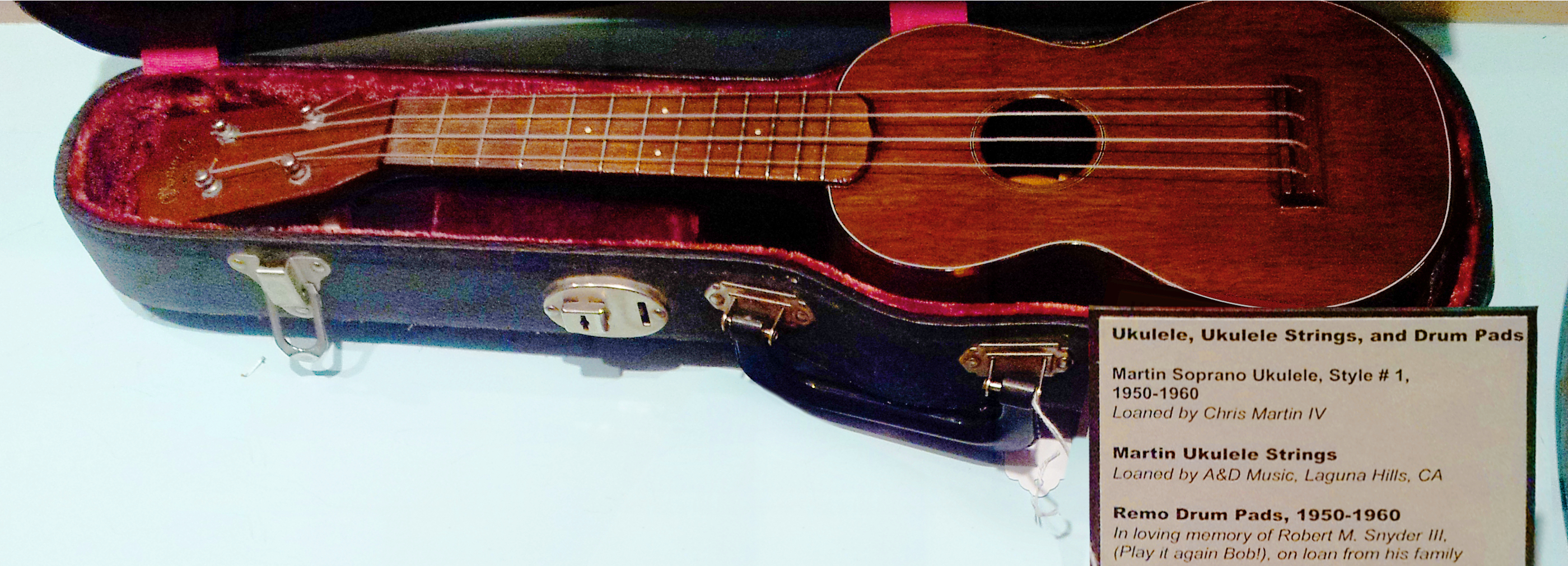
Martin Soprano Ukulele Style 1 (1950-1960)

The company's reputation and output continued to grow. Forays into mandolin making in the late 1890s and ukulele-making in the 1920s greatly contributed to their expansion.

=== 20th century ===
By 1928, the company was making over 5,000 instruments per year. The ukulele was responsible for keeping the company profitable in the 1920s. The company remained family-owned and employed a relatively small number of highly trained craftsmen working primarily by hand. By the early 1960s, Martin guitars were back-ordered by as much as three years due to limited production capacity. In 1964, Martin opened a new plant that is still the primary Martin production facility.

One of the consistent policies of the company was to not engage in endorsement deals. At the same time, they offered a 20% discount as a courtesy to professional musicians. They would also offer to customize instruments with fretboard inlays of names for the performers.

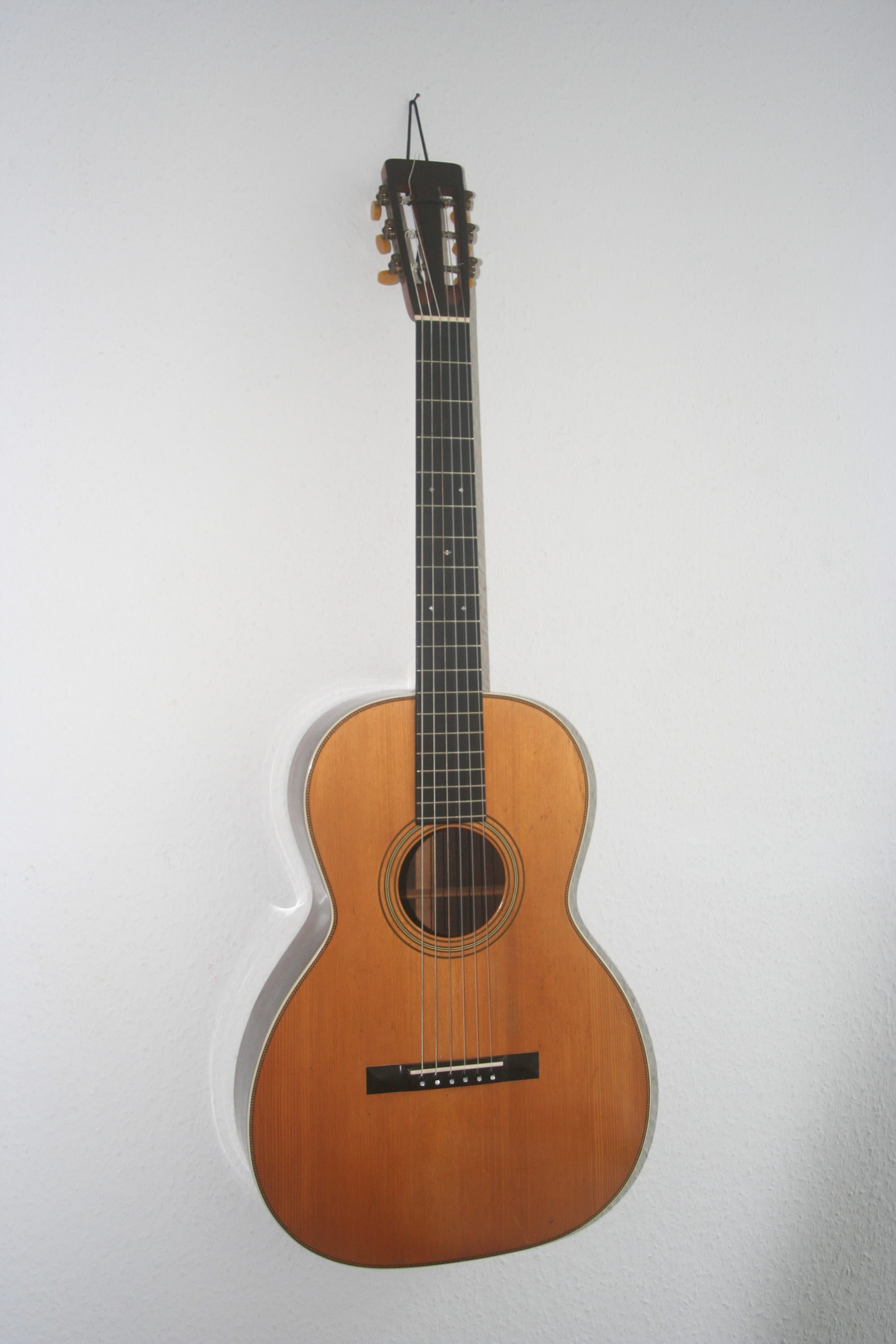
An example of an original 12-fret joint short-scale model: 00-28 nylon string guitar (1907)

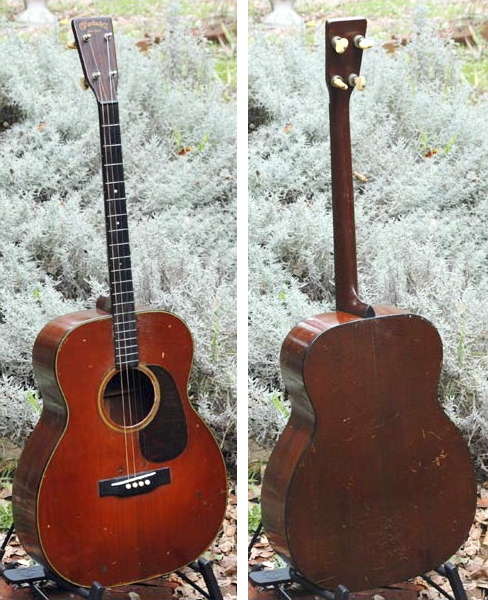
The Martin 0-18T tenor guitar with a modified 0-size body and a 14-fret joint neck (1933), was a successor of the "Carl Fischer Model" (1927–1930).

The Great Depression drastically affected Martin's sales. The company came up with two innovations to help regain business. One of these was joining the neck to the body at the 14th fret, which allowed easier access to higher notes. Most guitars of the day had necks joined at the 12th fret. Martin intended for this to appeal to plectrum banjo players interested in switching to guitar. This was in response to requests from tenor guitar players including Al Esposito, the manager of the Carl Fischer store in New York City. The "Carl Fischer Model" tenors were soon renamed 0-18T. Martin altered the shape of its 0-size guitar body to accommodate joining the neck at the 14th fret.

During this time, Perry Bechtel, a well-known banjo player and guitar teacher from Cable Piano in Atlanta, requested that Martin build a guitar with a 15-fret neck-to-body join. In keeping with Bechtel's request, Martin modified the shape of their 12-fret 000-size instrument, lowering the waist and giving the upper bout more acute curves to cause the neck joint to fall at the 14th fret rather than the 12th. Fourteen-fret guitars were designed to play with a pick and replace banjos in jazz orchestras. Thus Martin named its first 14-fret, 000-shape guitar the Orchestra Model (OM). Martin applied this term to all 14-fret instruments in its catalogs by the mid- to late-1930s.

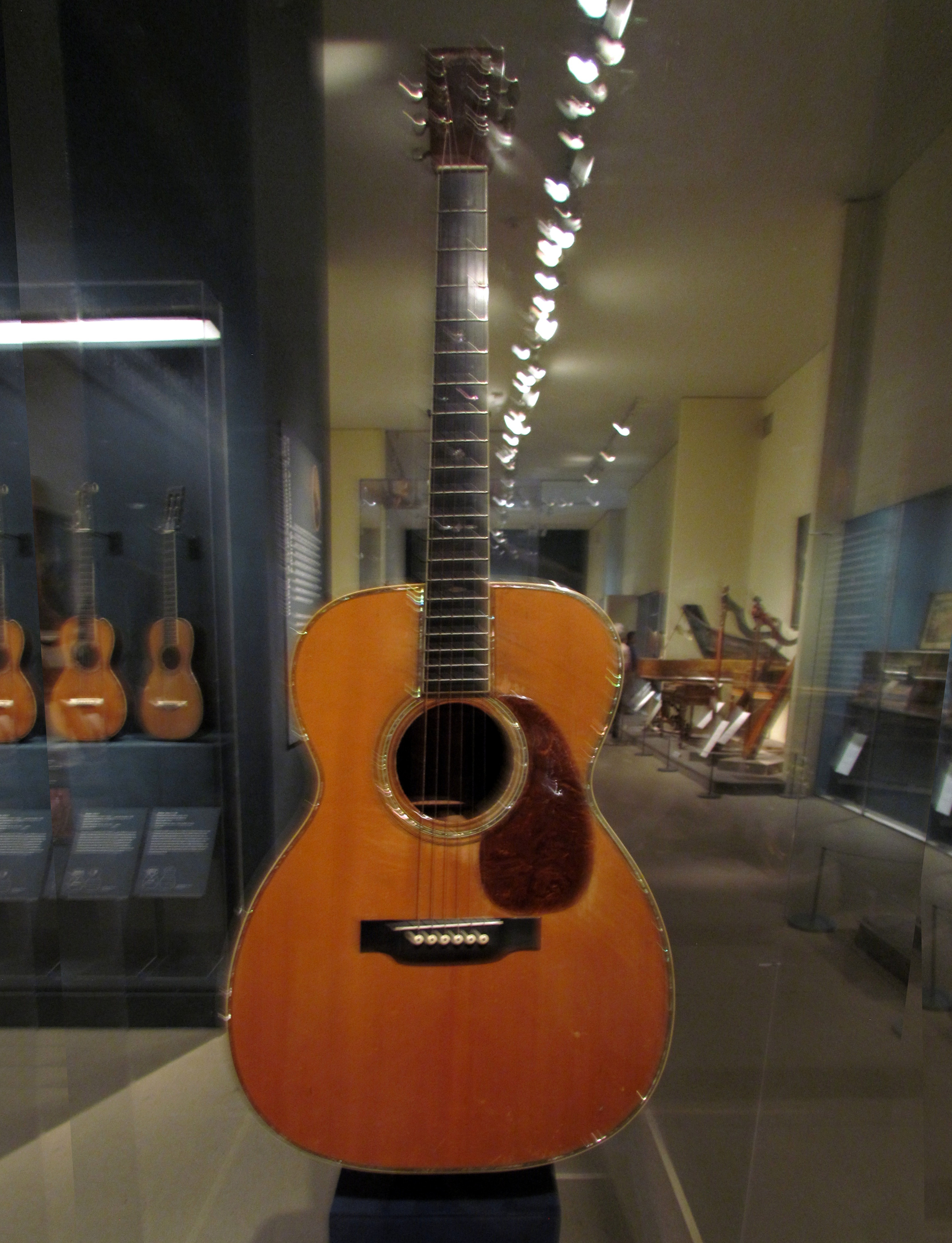
000-42 with OM body, 14-fret joint shortscale

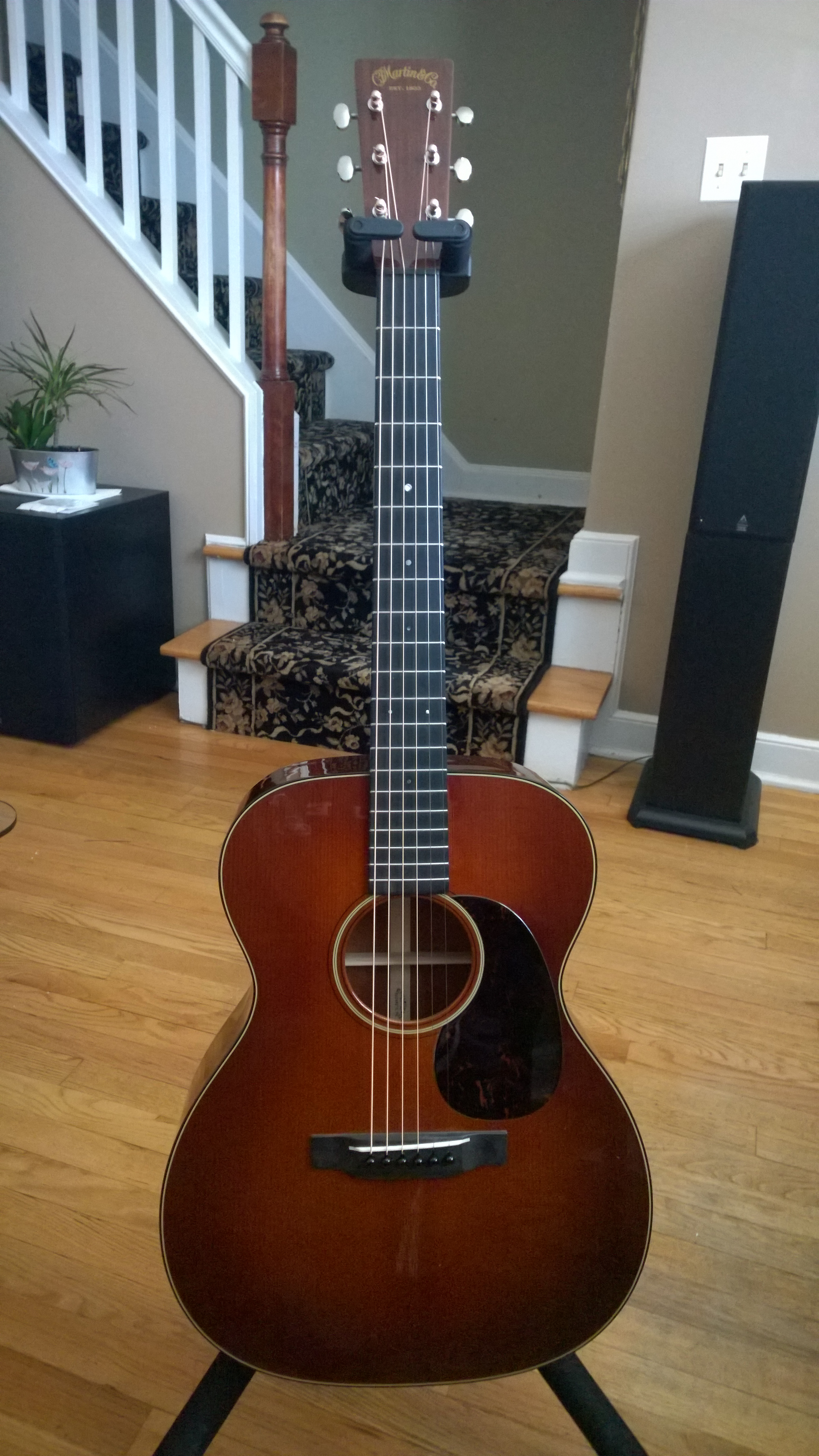
OM-18 with modified 000 body and 14-fret joint longscale neck (reissue of 1933 model)

Original Martin OMs from approximately 1929 to 1931 are extremely rare and sell for high prices. Many guitarists believe that the OM—a combination of Martin's modified 14-fret 000 body shape, long scale (25.4") neck, solid headstock, 1-3/4" nut width, 4-1/8" maximum depth at the endwedge, and 2-3/8" string spread at the bridge—offers the most versatile combination of features available in a steel-string acoustic guitar. Many contemporary guitar makers design instruments on the OM pattern.

The change in body shape and longer neck became so popular that Martin made the 14-fret neck standard on almost all of its guitars, and the rest of the guitar industry soon followed. Classical guitars, which were evolving on their own track largely among European builders, retained the 12-fret neck design.

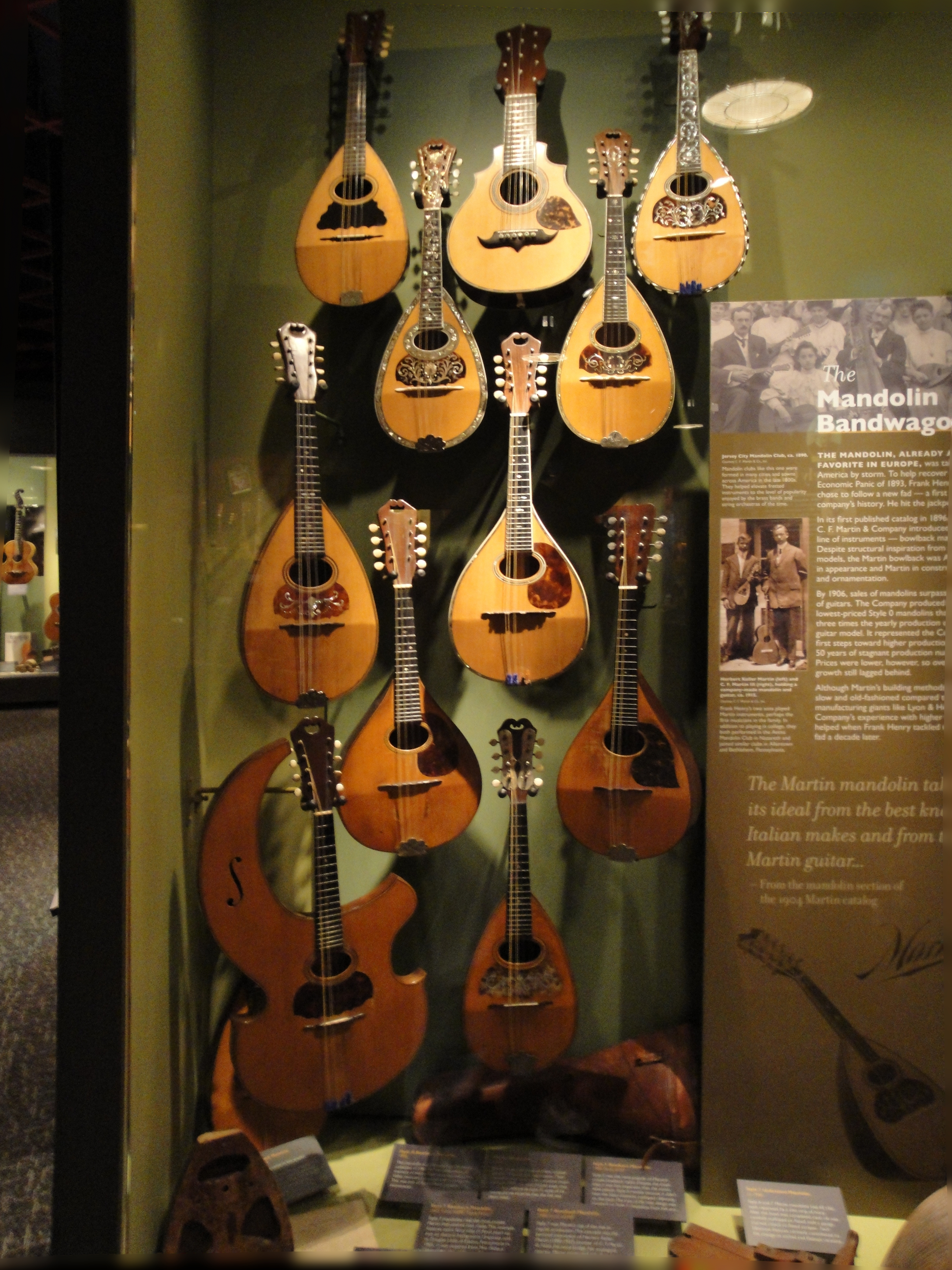
C. F. Martin & Company's mandolins

==== Dreadnought ====
Martin's second major innovation of the period 1915–1930 was the dreadnought. Originally devised in 1916 in collaboration with a prominent retailer, the Oliver Ditson Co., the dreadnought body style was larger and deeper than most guitars. Martin borrowed the name of the British battleship HMS Dreadnought for their new, large guitar. The greater volume and louder bass produced by this expansion in size was intended to make the guitar more useful as an accompaniment instrument for singers. Initial models produced for Ditson were fan-braced, and the instruments were poorly received.

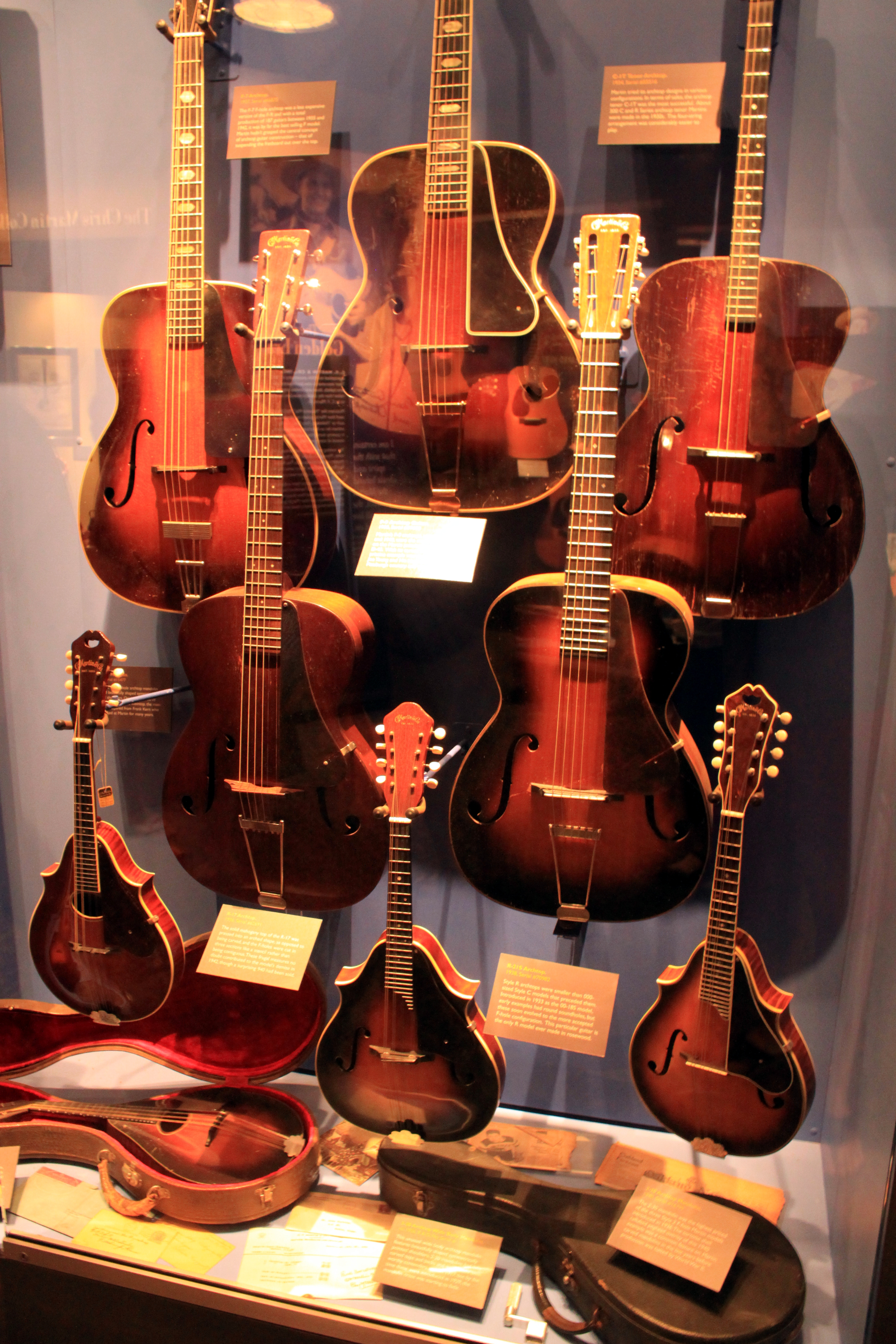
A selection of Martin archtop guitars and mandolins from the 1930s–40s.

In 1931, Martin reintroduced the dreadnought with X-bracing and two years later gave it a modified body shape to accommodate a 14-fret neck, and it quickly became their best-selling guitar. The "dreadnought" size and shape subsequently became one of the standard acoustic guitar shapes.

==== Archtop ====
Martin also developed a line of archtops during the 1930s. Their design differed from Gibson and other archtops in a variety of respects–the fingerboard was glued to the top, rather than a floating extension of the neck, and the backs and sides were flat rosewood plates pressed into an arch rather than the more common carved figured maple. Martin archtops were not commercially successful and were withdrawn after several years. In spite of this, during the 1960s, David Bromberg had a Martin F-7 archtop converted to a flat-top guitar with exceptionally successful results, and as a result, Martin has issued a David Bromberg model based on this conversion (no longer in production). This and other conversions of Martin F-size guitars later became the basis for the Martin "M"-sized guitars, also known as the 0000 size. The original production models of this size in the 1970s were the M-36 and the M-38. After a hiatus, the M-36 is once again in regular production.

During this time, Martin also continued to make ukuleles, tiples, and mandolins.

=== 1960s ===
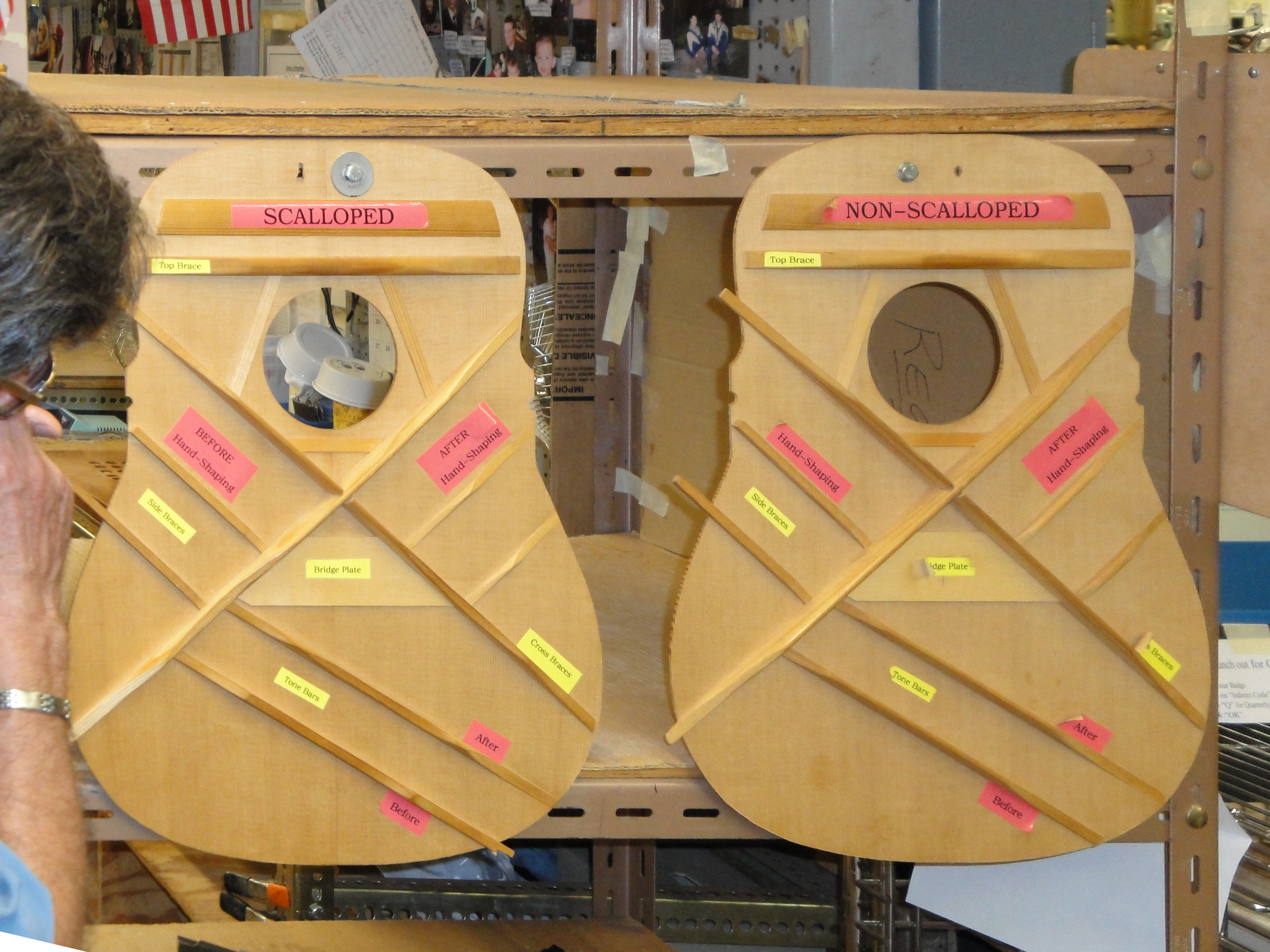
X-bracing with scalloped (left) and non-scalloped (right) braces

During the late 1960s, Martin manufactured hollow-body electric guitar similar to those manufactured by Gretsch. Martin's electric guitars were not popular and the company has since produced only acoustics. They also reinstated the famous D-45 in 1968.

During the 1960s, many musicians, including Clarence White and Eric Thompson, preferred Martin guitars built before World War II to more recent guitars of the same model. The pre-war guitars had a different internal bracing pattern consisting of scalloped braces (the later ones were tapered rather than scalloped), with the x-brace forward-shifted to about an inch of the sound hole, producing better resonance, and tops made from Adirondack red spruce rather than Sitka spruce.

After 1969, the rosewood components, including the backs and sides of some models, were changed from Brazilian rosewood to Indian rosewood, due to restrictions on the sale of Brazilian rosewood. The D-28s and D-35s, which were introduced in the mid-1960s to make use of the more narrow pieces of wood by using a three-piece back design, are now very sought-after on the vintage guitar market, fetching sums from $50,000 to $60,000. The same models from the early 1970s, with Indian Rosewood backs and sides, generally sell for less than $2,500.

Martin Dreadnought size guitars

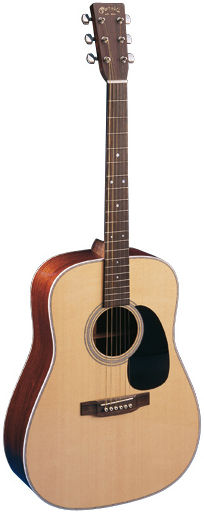
Martin D-28

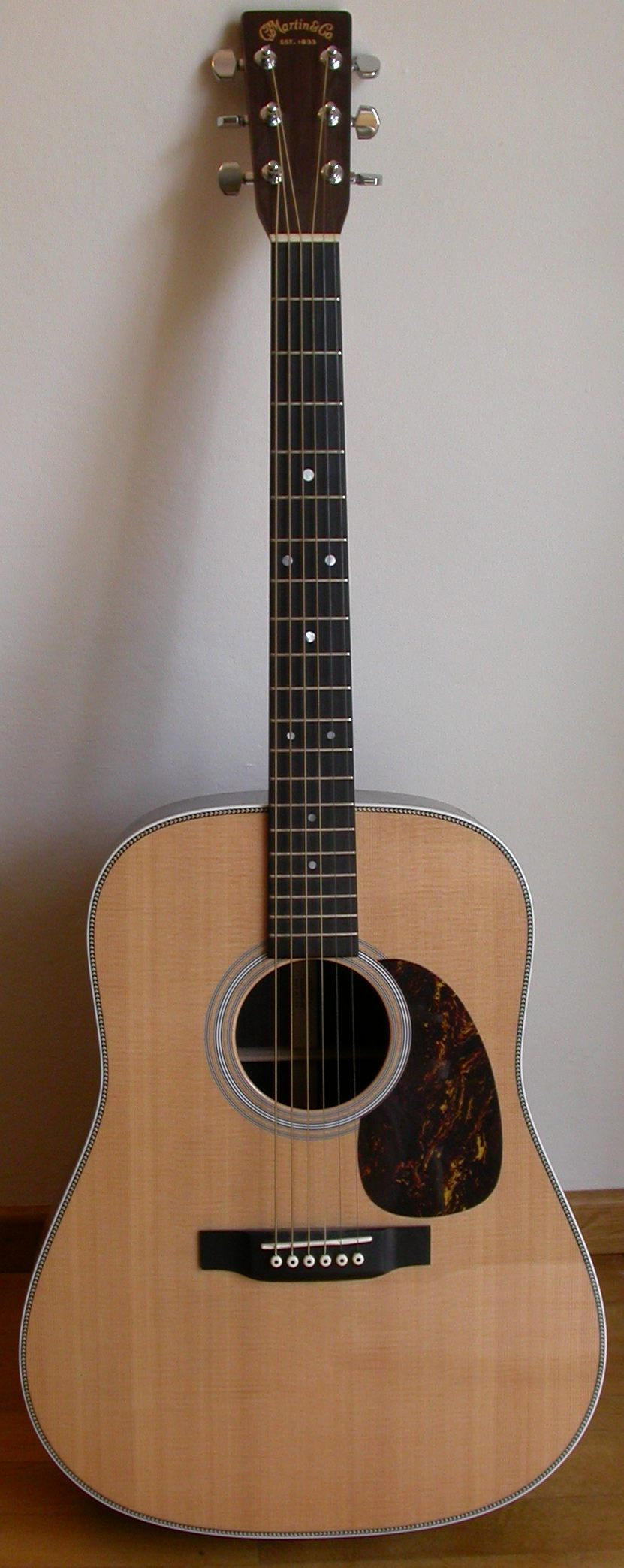
Martin HD-28

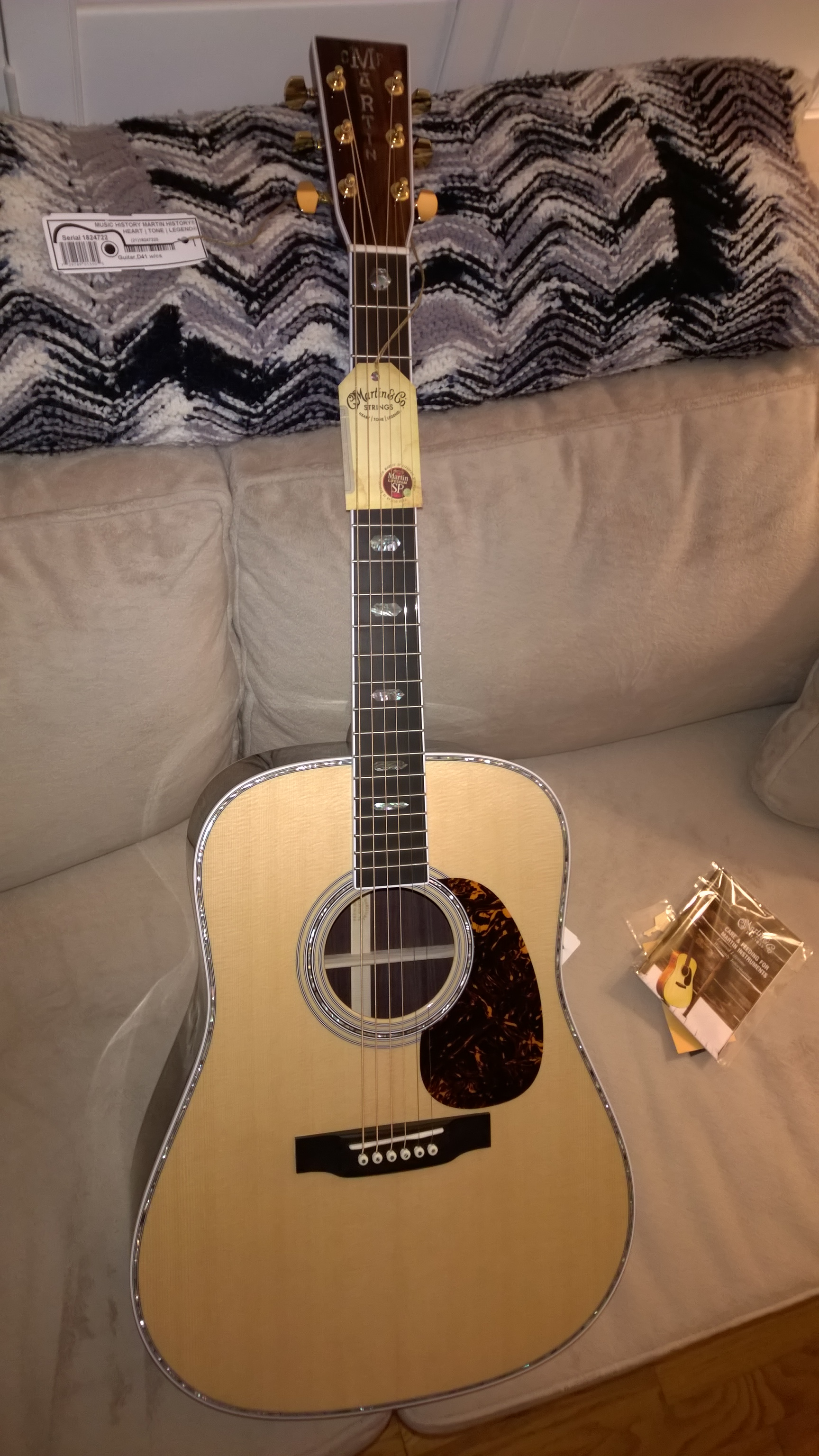
Martin D-41

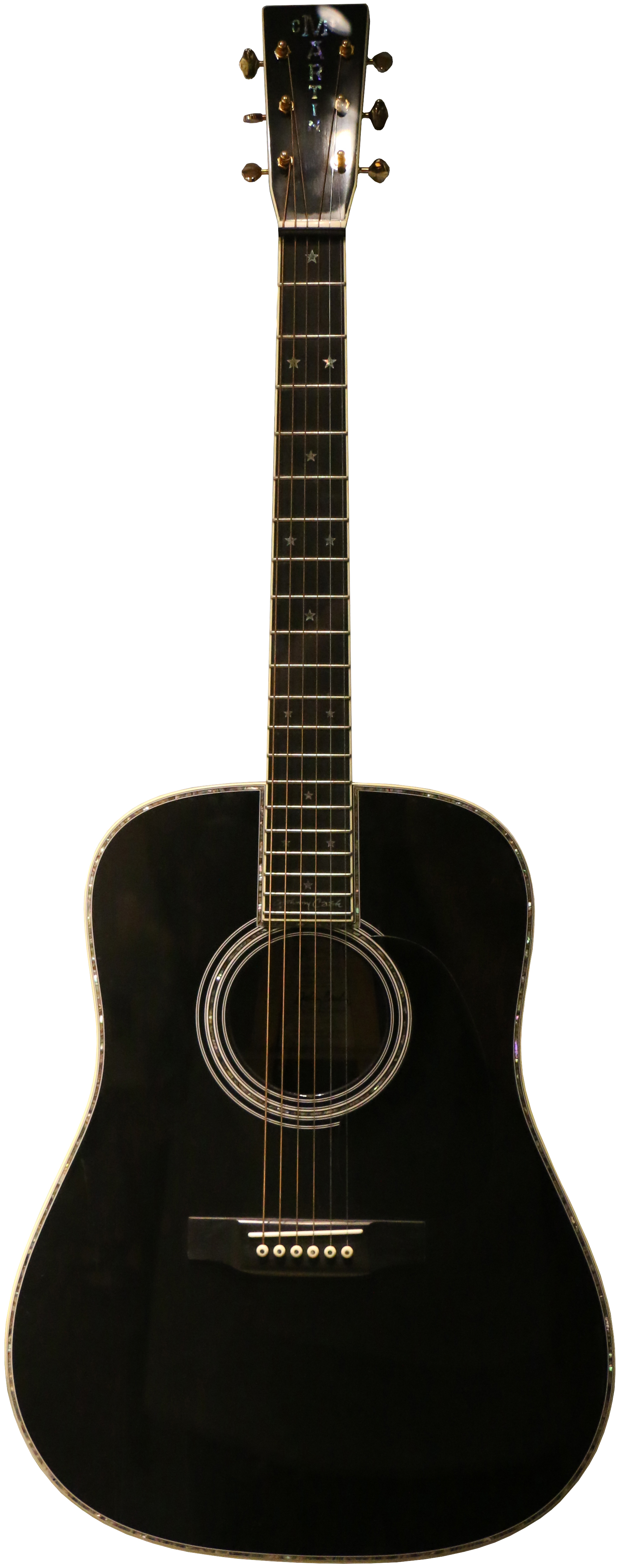
Martin D-42 Johnny Cash Signature

Martin domestically produced hollow-body electric guitars in the mid-1960s, the GT-70, and GT-75. About 700 of each were produced. The guitars looked like a cross between Gretsch and Guild hollow-body guitars. The guitars have a typical 60's jangly sound. DeArmond pickups were used. The units had Kluson tuners and most had a machined aluminum bridge though some were made with wooden bridges. Single and double-cutaway models were produced. Black, red and burgundy colors were available. The guitars failed to make a significant cultural or commercial impact.

Martin electric guitars and basses after mid-1960s

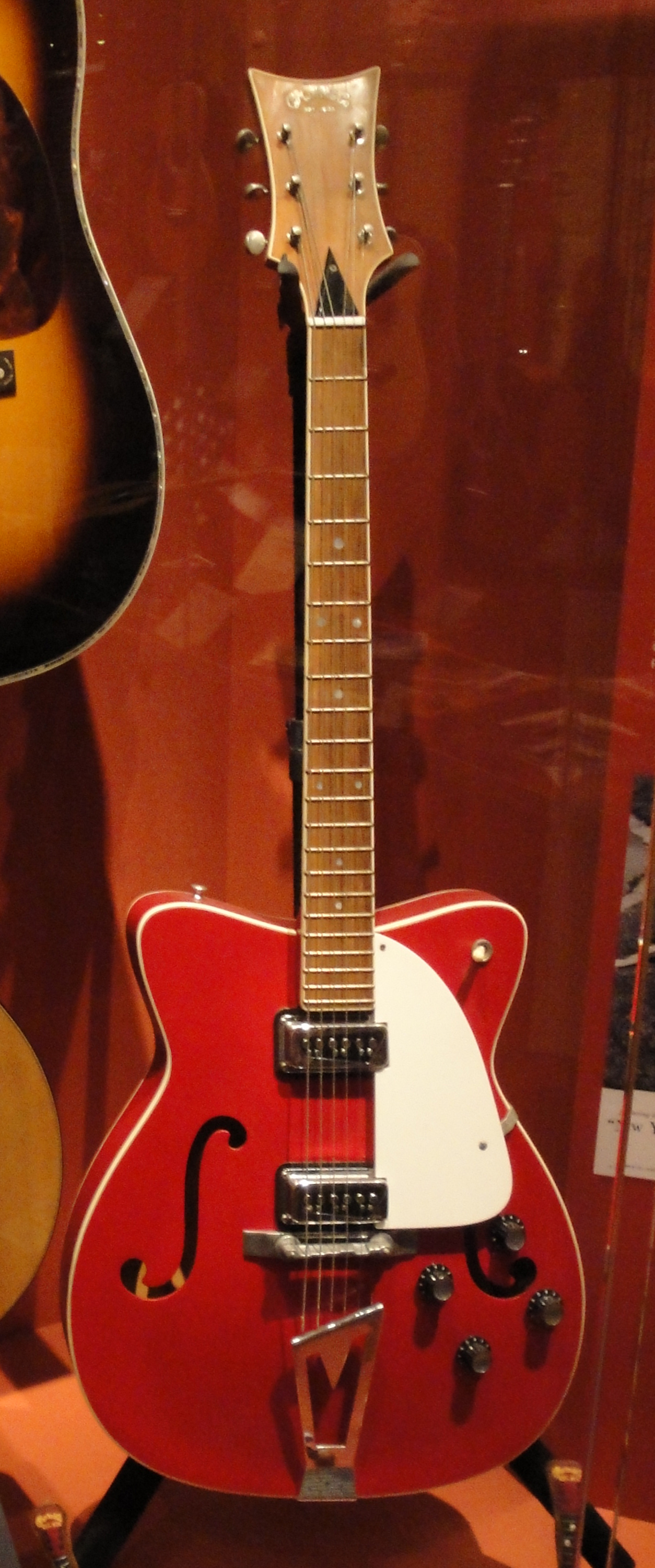
Martin GT-75 (1967)

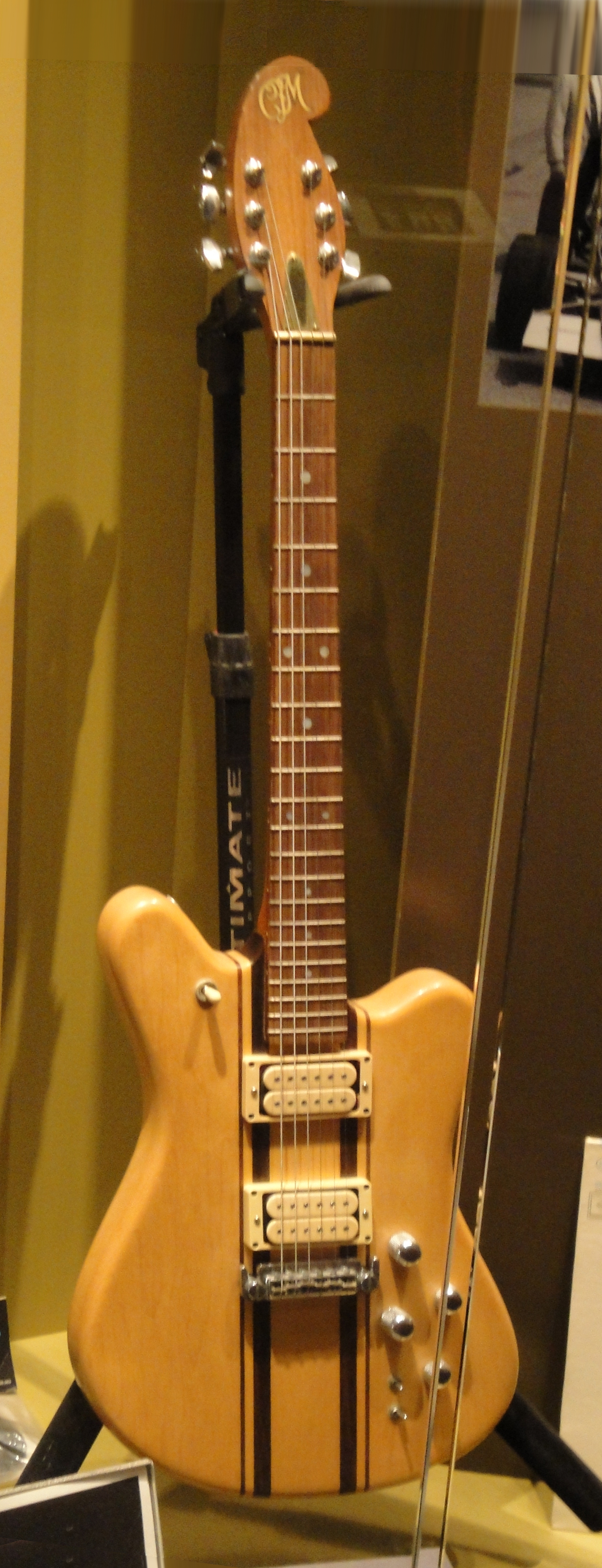
Martin EM-18 (1979)

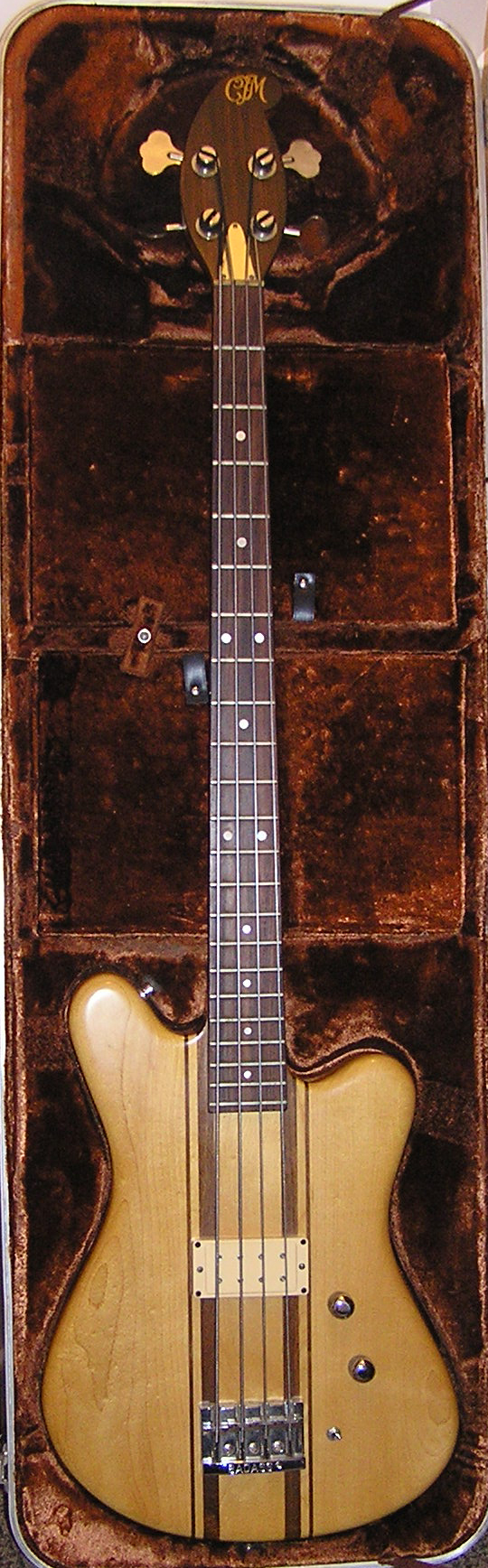
Martin EB18 (1979)

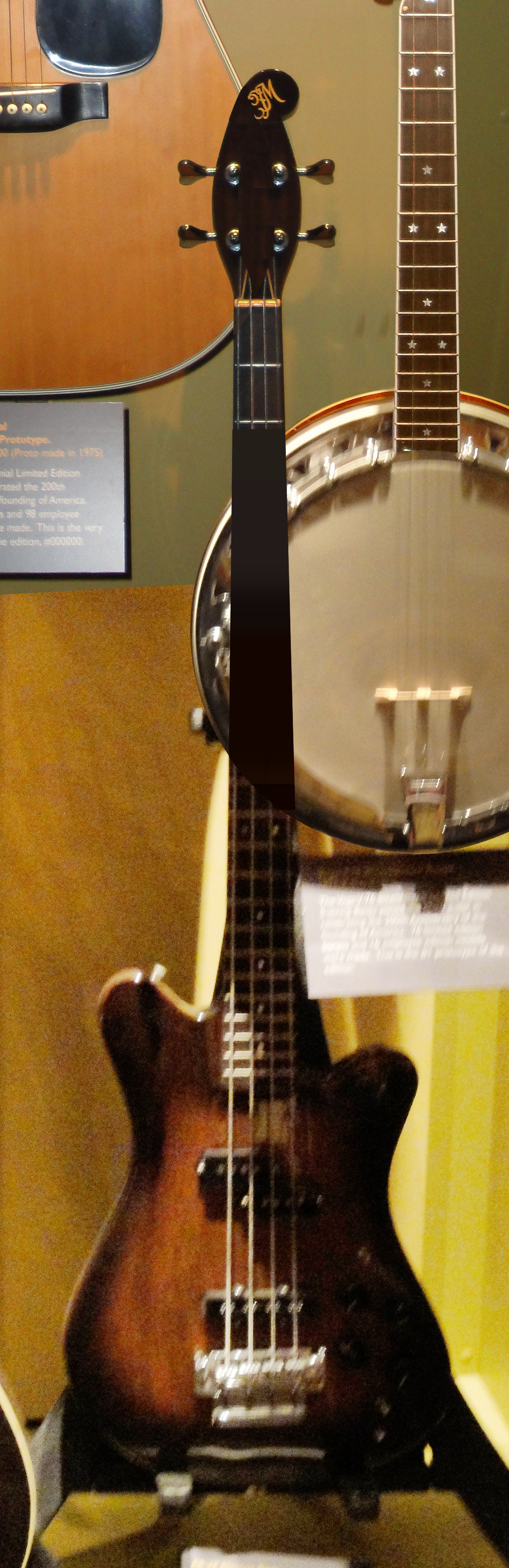
Martin EB-28 (1983)

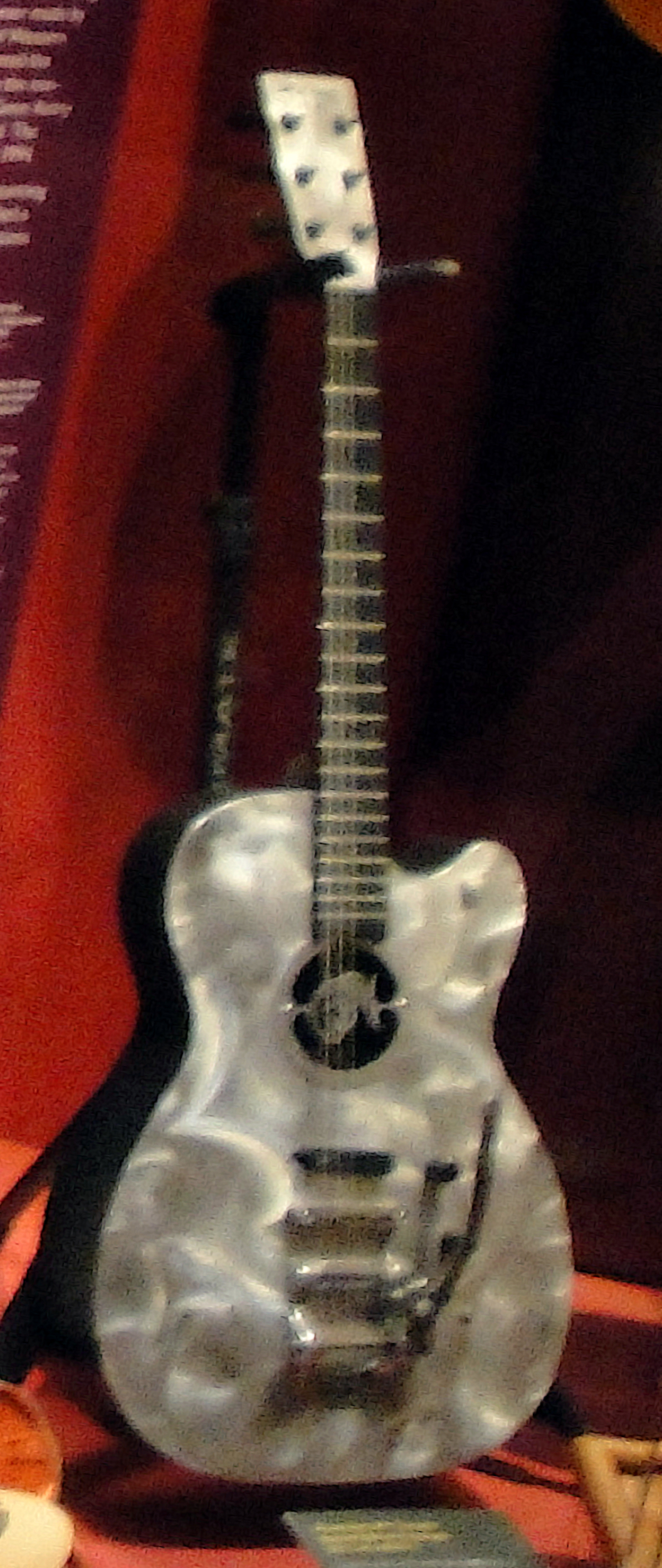
Martin ALternative XT (2002-)

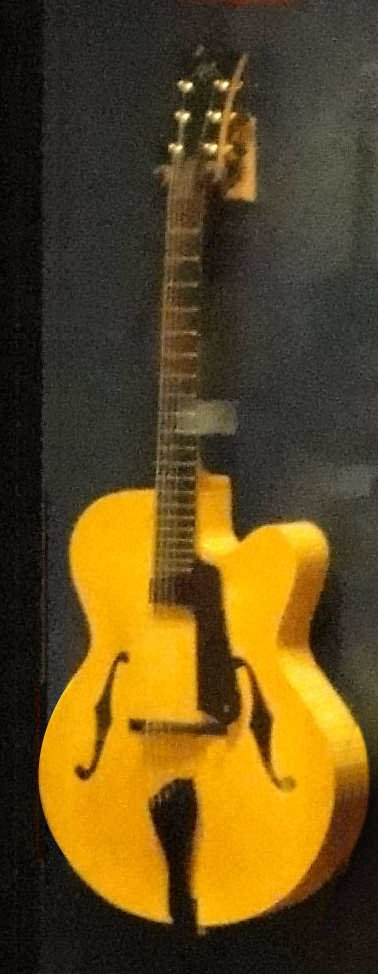
Martin CF-1 (2004)

=== Stinger Guitars ===
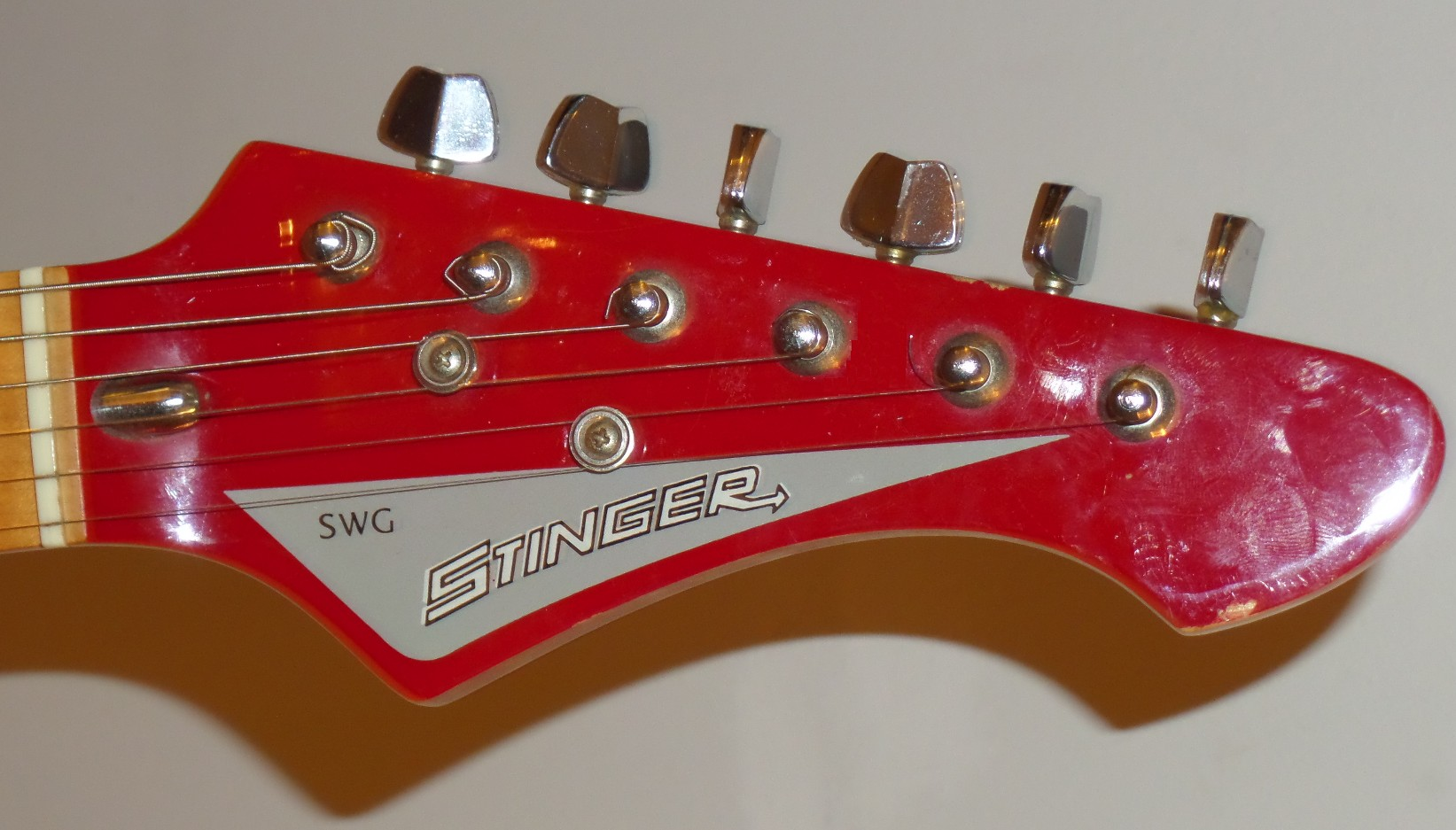
Stinger SWG (1985–1996) headstock (⇑) and entire body (⇒)

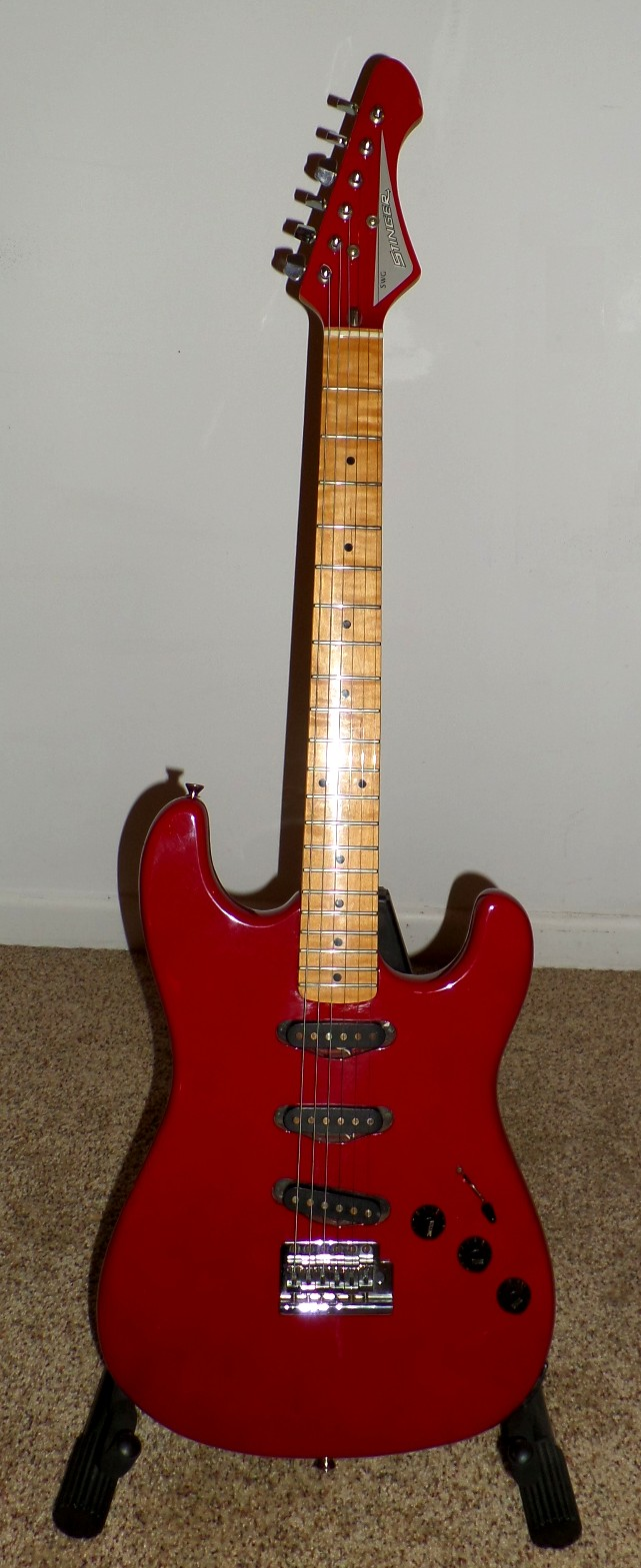

From 1985 to 1996, Martin produced a line of solid body electric guitars and basses under the brand name Stinger. These were modeled after Fender guitars and were made in South Korea. The guitars were shipped to the Martin factory where they were inspected and given a final setup before being sent on to the distributors.

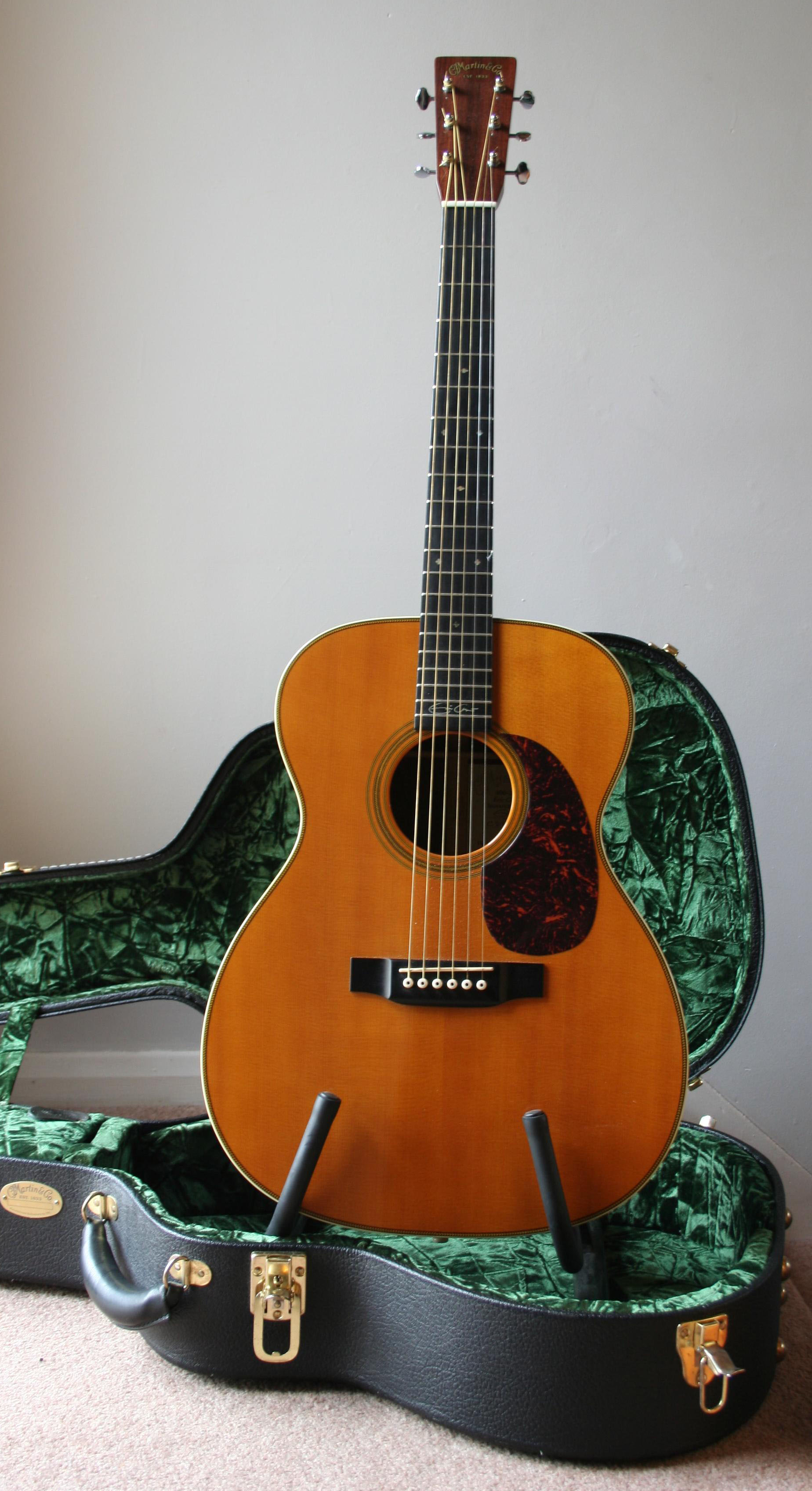
C.F. Martin 000-28EC Eric Clapton model

Martin opened its "Custom Shop" division in 1979. Martin built its 500,000th guitar in 1990, and in 2004 they built their millionth guitar. This guitar is entirely hand-crafted and features more than 40 inlaid rubies and diamonds. It is worth an estimated $1 million. As of 2007, Martin employed 600 people.

=== 21st century ===
In October 2009, the Martin D-28 played by Elvis Presley at his last concert was purchased at auction for $106,200.

In an effort to attract customers from the growing mid-level guitar market, Martin introduced their first guitar constructed with laminated wood in 1993 with the D1 series that had laminated wood sides and a solid wood back. Since then they have also introduced an even less expensive DX series using printable high-pressure laminates and laminated "durabond" necks and yet maintain high tonal quality, built at their factory in Navojoa, Sonora, Mexico.

In January 2018, Martin announced it would release a D-45 John Mayer signature model. The model was unveiled at the winter NAMM Show.

In 2018, Martin hired Greg Koch as a Martin guitar ambassador. Koch now does clinics demonstrating Martin guitar models.

In support of the imprisoned Kurdish singer Nûdem Durak, Roger Waters sent her his black Martin guitar he had played during the Us + Them Tour.

On June 21, 2020, the 1959 Martin D-18 E played by Kurt Cobain during Nirvana's 1993 MTV Unplugged appearance sold at auction for $6,010,000, a record sale price for a guitar.

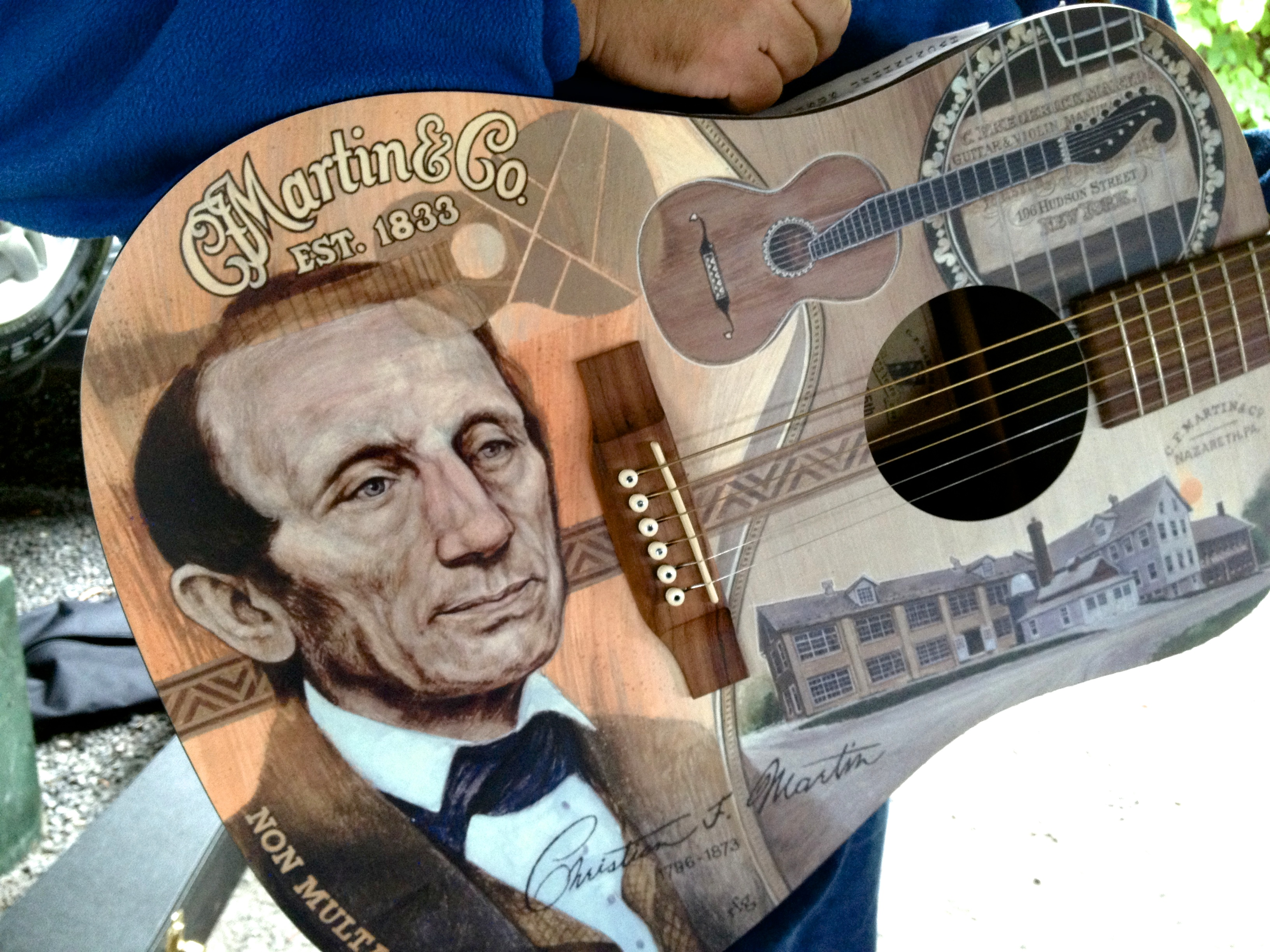
A Martin guitar featuring a portrait of founder Christian Frederick Martin, displayed for the company's 175th anniversary

On August 1, 2020, a D-18 owned and used by Elvis Presley from December 1954 to May 1955 sold at auction for US$1,320,000, the highest price ever paid for a non-modified acoustic guitar.

In June 2021, C.F. Martin IV retired as CEO, but maintained a seat on the board of directors as Executive Chairman. Thomas Ripsam has since assumed the role of CEO, making him the first CEO of the company not from the Martin family.

== See also ==
- List of music museums

== Bibliography ==
- Acoustic Guitars: The Illustrated Encyclopedia. New York: Chartwell Books. 2011. pp. 196–221. ISBN 978-0-7858-3571-4.
- Denyer, Ralph; Guillory, Isaac; Crawford, Alastair M. (1982). The guitar handbook. New York: Knopf: Distributed by Random House. pp. 36–45. ISBN 0-394-71257-9.
- Denyer, Ralph (1992). "Acoustic guitars: Steel-string acoustic guitars ('Martin guitars' pp. 44–45 and 'Martin 'Dreadnoughts' p. 44–45)". The Guitar Handbook. Special contributors Isaac Guillory and Alastair M. Crawford, Foreword by Robert Fripp (Fully revised and updated ed.). London and Sydney: Pan Books. pp. 44–45. ISBN 0-330-32750-X.
- Gura, Philip F. (2003). C.F. Martin and His Guitars, 1796–1873. Chapel Hill: University of North Carolina Press. ISBN 0-8078-2801-7.
- Washburn, Jim; Johnston, Richard; Stills, Stephen (2002). Martin Guitars: An Illustrated Celebration of America's Premier Guitarmaker. Pleasantville, NY: Reader's Digest. ISBN 0-7621-0427-9.
- Wilson, Carey. "Profiles in Quality with Vince Gentilcore". Quality Digest. November 2007. pp. 56–8.
