= Eric Schoenberg =

American guitarist

Eric Schoenberg is an American guitarist known for his fingerstyle guitar playing, as well as a recording artist and designer of acoustic guitars. He has performed, toured, recorded and written extensively.

He owns Eric Schoenberg Guitars, a guitar store in Tiburon, California, which sells vintage and luthier-made acoustic guitars.

Eric and his cousin Dave Laibman were among the first transposers of classical piano ragtime to the guitar. This resulted in their album, Contemporary Ragtime Guitar, on Folkways Records.

== Publications ==
- "Fingerpicking Beatles" published by Hal Leonard

== Recordings ==
- The New Ragtime Guitar (1971), Folkways Records, with his cousin David Laibman
- Acoustic Guitar (1977), Rounder Records
- Steel Strings (1982), Rounder Records
- Late Night Conversations (1997), Live Music Recordings, a duet with Richard Scholtz
