= List of women classical guitarists =

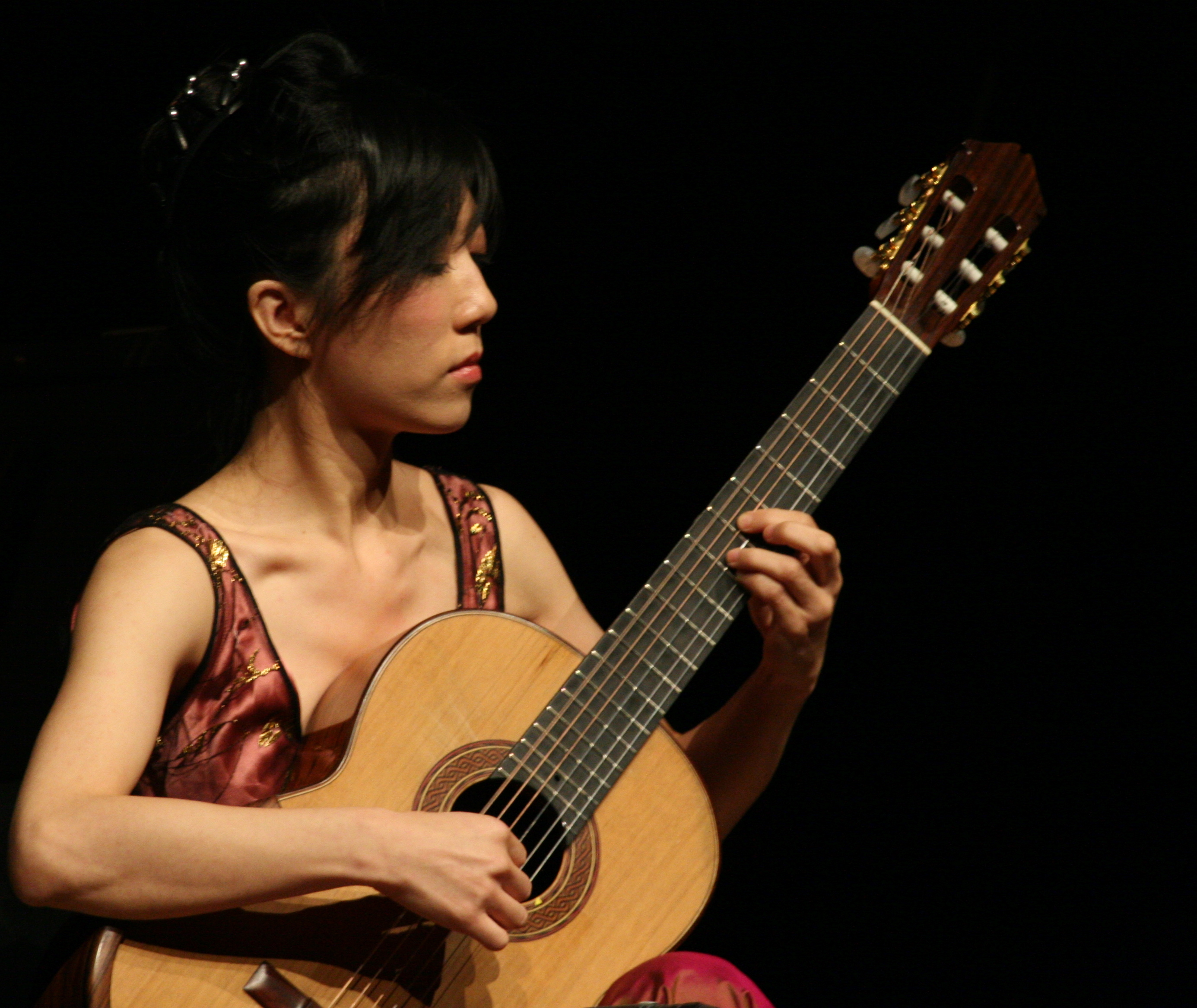
Xuefei Yang performing in 2008

The following is a list of women classical guitarists by nationality – notable women who are well known for their work in the field of classical music.

== Argentina ==
- María Luisa Anido (1907–1996), classical guitarist and composer
- Delia Estrada (born 1957), classical guitarist, educator, author of guitar method, has lived since 1977 in Paris
- Celia Salomón de Font (about 1908–2002), classical guitarist and educator
- María Isabel Siewers (born 1950), international performer and soloist, educator

== Australia ==
- Milica Davies (born 1981), Yugoslav-born Australian classical guitarist and recording artist, now based in London
- Isolde Schaupp (1945–2003), German-Australian classical guitarist, educator, author of two guitar methods
- Karin Schaupp (born 1972), German-Australian classical guitarist and actress, member of the Saffire quartet, recording artist

== Austria ==
- Caroline Auer (born 1978), classical guitarist, was member of the female guitar quintet "Gitarrissima"
- Marga Bäuml (1916–2004), classical guitarist, gave concerts as a soloist and in a duo with her husband Walter Klasinc (violin)
- Johanna Beisteiner (born 1976), international soloist
- Maria Benischek (born 1976), classical guitarist, was member of the female guitar quintet "Gitarrissima"
- Luise Walker (1910–1998), prominent classical guitarist and composer

== Belgium ==
- Ilse Alfonso (1929–2017), classical guitarist and educator
- Raphaella Smits (born 1957), classical guitarist and educator

== Brazil ==
- Olga Praguer Coelho (1909–2008), classical guitarist and folk singer
- Maria Lívia São Marcos (born 1942), classical guitarist, international performer, and educator

== Canada ==
- Liona Boyd (born 1949), British-born Canadian classical guitarist, recording artist, and writer
- Emily Alice Shaw (fl. 2000s), classical guitarist and educator
- Laura Young (born 1962), international soloist, chamber musician, recording artist, and educator

== China ==
- Chen Shanshan (born 1983), guitarist, sometimes performing with other female guitarists as one of the Four Angels
- Li Jie (born 1981), classical guitarist performing with God's Favored Girls Super Trio and with the Four Angels quartet
- Su Meng (born 1988), classical guitarist performing as a soloist and as one of the Four Angels female guitar quartet
- Wang Yameng (born 1981), classical guitarist, performing with the Four Angels female guitar quartet
- Xuefei Yang (born 1977), awarding-winning classical guitarist, international performer, recording artist

== Croatia ==
- Ana Vidović (born 1980), classical guitarist, international performer, and educator

== Cuba ==
- Marta Cuervo (um 1930–2011), prominent Cuban classical guitarist and educator
- Clara (Cuqui) Nicola (1926–2017), prominent classical Cuban guitarist and educator
- Clara Romero de Nicola (1888–1951), prominent Cuban classical guitarist and educator

== France ==
- Tania Chagnot (born 1962), classical guitarist and music educator
- Madeleine Cottin (1876–1966), classical guitarist, mandolinist, composer and music educator, sister of Alfred Cottin and Jules Cottin
- Colette Mourey (born 1954), classical guitarist, music educator, musicologist, and composer
- Ida Presti (1924–1967), child prodigy, prominent classical guitarist and composer, duos with her husband Alexandre Lagoya
- Jeanne Ricada-Mathorez (1887–1980), classical guitarist, mandolinist, conductor, arranger, and music educator
- Gaëlle Solal (born 1978), international performer, chamber musician, and educator

== Germany ==
- Margarete Buch (1914–2013), classical guitarist, arranger and music educator, member of the "Buch-Terzett" in Leipzig
- Annette Degenhardt (1965–2022), classical guitarist, recording artist, music educator, lived in Ireland
- Ida Faber-Gille (1910–2003), classical guitarist and music educator
- Else Goguel (1924–2017), classical guitarist and music educator, member of the "Buch-Terzett" in Leipzig and the "Gitarrenensemble Bruno Henze" in Berlin
- Christa Golf (1928–2015), classical guitarist and music educator, had taught at the "Hochschule für Musik" in Dresden
- Maria Kämmerling (born 1946), specializing in contemporary classical guitar music, educator in Denmark
- Ursula Kurze (born 1963), classical guitarist, singer, composer and music educator, now based in Dresden
- Heike Matthiesen (1964–2023), international soloist and chamber musician, specializing in female composers
- Giulia Pelzer (1837–1938), classical guitarist, sister of Catharina Pratten
- Catharina Pratten (1824–1895), classical guitarist, sister of Giulia Pelzer, has lived in London since 1829
- Barbara Richter-Rumstig (born 1940), classical guitarist, also as Duo with her husband Dieter Rumstig, recording artist and educator
- Monika Rost (born 1943), classical guitarist, lute player, musicologist, Professor at the Hochschule für Musik in Weimar
- Evelyne Schönfeld (born 1938), classical guitarist and educator
- Inge Wilczok-Stahl (born 1944), classical guitarist, Professor at the Hochschule für Musik "Hanns Eisler" in Berlin

== Greece ==
- Antigoni Goni (born 1969), international performer and educator, now based in Brussels
- Liza Zoi (born 1940), classical guitarist (also Duo with her husband Evangelos Assimakopoulos) and educator

== Hungary ==
- Krisztina Groß Dobó (born 1977), classical guitarist, was member of the female guitar quintet "Gitarrissima"

== Italy ==
- Simona Boni (born 1975), classical guitarist, musicologist, and author
- Rita Brondi (1889–1941), classical guitarist, lutenist, singer, composer, and music historian
- Francesca Caccini (1587 – after 1641) was an Italian composer, singer, lutenist, Guitarist, poet, and music teacher of the early Baroque era.
- Carmen Lenzi Mozzani (1923–1969), classical guitarist, composer, and educator, granddaughter of Luigi Mozzani
- Carla Minen (1950–1996), classical guitarist
- Filomena Moretti (born 1973), classical guitarist, recording artist and broadcaster, performances throughout Europe
- Teresa de Rogatis (1893 – 1979), classical guitarist, pianist, composer, and music teacher
- Sara Stegani (1913–1950), classical guitarist
- Regina Strinasacchi (1761 – 1839), classical guitarist, violinist, and composer
- Eli Tagore (1930 – 2015), classical guitarist and educator, grandniece of Rabindranath Tagore
- Marina Tomei (born around 1988), international concert classical guitarist

== Japan ==
- Keiko Fujiie (born 1963), guitarist and composer
- Ako Ito (born 1942), classical guitarist, also Duo with her husband Henri Dorigny (1939–2022), and educator
- Kaori Muraji (born 1978), classical guitarist and recording artist
- Kanahi Yamashita (born 1997), classical guitarist and recording artist
- Naoko Yamashita (born 1961), classical guitarist and recording artist

== Mexico ==
- Corazón Otero (1944–2013), classical guitarist and author

== Netherlands ==
- Olga Franssen (born 1954), classical guitarist and educator, member of the Amsterdam Guitar Trio
- Nelly de Hilster (1940–2017), classical guitarist and educator
- Annette Kruisbrink (born 1958), classical guitarist and composer

== Paraguay ==
- Berta Rojas (born 1966), international performer, artistic director, broadcaster, and recording artist

== Russia ==
- Anastasia Bardina (born 1962), virtuoso guitarist, also of seven- and twelve-string guitars
- Irina Kulikova (born 1982), international soloist, now based in the Netherlands

== Serbia ==
- Sabrina Vlaškalić (1989–2019), concert classical guitarist and educator, died in a traffic accident in Groningen

== South Korea ==
- Kyuhee Park (born 1985), international concert classical guitarist

== Spain ==
- Laura Almerich (1940–2019), Catalan guitarist associated with the Nova Cançó movement
- Emilia Corral Sancho (born 1935), classical guitarist, third wife of Andrés Segovia
- Matilde Cuervas (1888–1956), classical and flamenco guitarist and educator, first wife of Emilio Pujol
- Margarita Escarpa (born 1964), classical guitarist specializing in Bach and chamber music recitals, educator
- Rosa Gil Bosque (1930–2026), classical guitarist and educator
- Carmen Marina (born 1936), classical guitarist and educator
- Anabel Montesinos (born 1984), classical guitarist and educator
- Josefina Robledo (1897–1972), classical guitarist and educator
- Pepita Roca (1897–1956), classical guitarist and educator
- Mariángeles Sánchez Benimeli (1943–2014) classical guitarist, educator and composer
- Renata Tarragó (1927–2005), Catalan classical guitarist, international performer, and educator

== Switzerland ==
- Deborah Mariotti (born 1959), classical guitarist, recording artist, and educator

== United Kingdom ==
- Rose Andresier (born 1942), classical guitarist and educator
- Nicola Hall (born 1969), award-winning guitarist who has recorded her own guitar transcriptions of classical works
- Victoria Kingsley (1900–2000), classical guitarist, toured the world singing to the accompaniment of her guitar
- Alexandra Whittingham (* 1997), classical guitarist and educator

== United States ==
- Lily Afshar (born 1950), Iranian-born American classical guitarist, recording artist, and educator
- Mary Akerman (born 1956), classical guitarist and educator
- Muriel Anderson (born 1960), classical, fingerstyle and harp guitarist, composer, and recording artist
- Anisa Angarola (born 1953), international performer, founder of the Los Angeles Guitar Quartet
- Alice Artzt (born 1943), international concert guitarist
- AnnaMaria Cardinalli (born 1979), classical guitarist, operatic contralto, investigative researcher, and educator
- Charo (fl. 1963), Spanish-American guitarist, actress, and broadcaster
- Sharon Isbin (born 1956), prominent soloist with some 200 orchestras, recording artist, and educator
- Chaconne Klaverenga (born 1992), international classical guitarist, recording artist
- Martha Masters (born 1972), classical guitarist, recording artist, and educator
- Vahdah Olcott-Bickford (1885–1980), founder of the American Guitar Society in Los Angeles, educator
- Gohar Vardanyan, classical guitarist, recording artist, and educator
- Ana Vidović (born 1980), Croatian-American classical guitarist, child prodigy, recording artist

== Uruguay ==
- Adriana Balboa (born 1966), classical guitarist, recording artist and educator, has lived since 1993 in Berlin
- Olga Pierri (1914–2016), classical guitarist and educator. She is the aunt of Alvaro Pierri.

== See also ==
- Lists of women in music
- Women in classical music
