= Christoph Hartmann (executive) =

American businessman (born 1970)

- Born: 1970 (age 55–56); Rosenheim, West Germany
- Education: Munich Business School
- Occupations: Amazon Games vice president Former 2K president and co-founder

Christoph Hartmann is a German-American video game executive and vice president of Amazon Games. Before assuming this position in 2018, he was president and co-founder of video game publisher 2K.

== Early life and education ==
Hartmann was born in Rosenheim, West Germany, in 1970. He attended university at Munich Business School. As of 2022, he splits his time between New York and Munich.

== Early career ==
Early in his career, Hartmann interned at BMG Music in Spain. In 1995, he moved to London and transitioned to a permanent role in the company's then-new BMG Interactive division. There, he worked with Sam and Dan Houser, who went on to create Rockstar Games. Hartmann also supported the launch of the original Grand Theft Auto in 1997 as well as Grand Theft Auto 2 in 1999, Grand Theft Auto III in 2001, and Grand Theft Auto: Vice City in 2002. In 1998, video game publisher Take-Two Interactive acquired BMG Interactive and Hartmann assumed the role of senior vice president of publishing.

== 2K Games ==
In 2005, Hartmann was a co-founder of 2K Games, a new publishing label formed when Take-Two Interactive acquired NBA 2K developer Visual Concepts. That same year, Hartmann orchestrated 2K's acquisition of the publishing rights for the Civilization series and buyout of Civilization developer Firaxis Games. Under Hartmann's leadership 2K published its first major hit, BioShock, in 2007. In 2009, Hartmann led 2K in publishing its next major franchise with the release of Borderlands.

At 2K, Hartmann established a reputation for prioritizing the quality of a game over rapid development, an approach for which he continued to advocate later in his career, at Amazon. Metacritic ranked Take-Two Interactive as the top video game publisher of 2010. Other games published under Hartmann at 2K include Evolve, Borderlands: The Pre-Sequel, Mafia, and several entries in the XCOM, Civilization, and NBA 2K series, including NBA 2K14, which in 2013 became the top-selling sports game in the U.S. on PlayStation 4 and Xbox One. He departed 2K as company president in May 2017.

== Amazon Games ==
In 2018, Hartmann joined Amazon as vice president of Amazon Game Studios, charged with leading the development and publishing businesses in Orange County, San Diego, and Seattle. At the time, each game published by Amazon was treated as its own business; Hartmann established a centralized publishing division within the company. Hartmann relaxed the unit's requirement to use the Amazon Lumberyard game engine, opening up development using Unreal Engine. He also encouraged Amazon to publish titles developed by other companies.

Shortly after Hartmann joined Amazon Games, the organization published Crucible and then returned it to closed beta and eventually canceled it in 2020. The company also developed and published New World, released in 2021, and published Lost Ark (originally published in South Korea in 2019) in North America and other regions in 2022. Amazon Games opened a fourth office in Montreal after Hartmann hired the core team that created Tom Clancy's Rainbow Six Siege in 2021. In September 2021, under Hartmann's leadership, Amazon Games announced a publishing deal with UK-based developer Glowmade (composed of Lionhead Studios alumni), for a new game based on original IP. The game, a cooperative combat multiplayer game, was officially revealed in August 2024 as King of Meat.

In 2022, after the departure of previous head Mike Frazzini, Hartmann assumed leadership of Amazon Games and Prime Gaming. In addition to the publishing agreement he secured with UK studio Glowmade, he is also responsible for several others for Amazon Games: with Embracer Group and Crystal Dynamics to publish the next game in the Tomb Raider franchise, with Disruptive Games, and with Bandai Namco to publish Blue Protocol in the west.

In October 2022, Variety included Hartmann in its annual list of leaders in entertainment gaming. The next year, Amazon Games announced a partnership with NCSoft to publish Throne and Liberty, which launched for Western audiences on October 1, 2024. In May 2023, Hartmann secured an agreement with Embracer Group, owner of Middle-earth Enterprises, for Amazon Games to create a massively multiplayer online game based on The Lord of the Rings.

In May 2024, Amazon Games, under Hartmann's direction, announced a new publishing agreement with developer Maverick Games, veteran developers behind the Forza Horizon series, for a yet unannounced open world, narrative-led driving game for PlayStation 5, Xbox Series X/S, and PC. That same month, Amazon Games announced the opening of a new game development studio in Europe, based in Bucharest, Romania, expanding on the business's commitment to develop and publish games.

In June 2024, Amazon Games announced the major content expansion of its popular RPG New World with New World: Aeternum, extending the game beyond PC to consoles, including PlayStation 5 and Xbox Series X/S. New World: Aeternum officially launched on October 15, 2024.
