= Christoph Hartmann =

Christoph Hartmann may refer to:

- Christoph Hartmann (politician), German politician
- Christoph Hartmann (executive), German-American video game executive
- Christoph Hartmann (oboist), German oboist
