= EMI Classics =

Record label founded by EMI in 1990

- Parent company: Thorn EMI (1990–1996); EMI (1996–2012); Parlophone Label Group (independent operation; 2012–2013); Warner Music Group (2013–present)
- Founded: 1990; 36 years ago
- Defunct: 2013; 13 years ago
- Status: Defunct
- Genre: Classical music
- Country of origin: United Kingdom

EMI Classics logo used until 2003

EMI Classics was a record label founded by Thorn EMI in 1990 to reduce the need to create country-specific packaging and catalogues for internationally distributed classical music releases. After Thorn EMI demerged in 1996, its recorded music division became the EMI Music Group. Following the European Commission's approval of the takeover of EMI Music Group by Universal Music Group in September 2012, EMI Classics was listed for divestment. The label was sold to Warner Music Group, which absorbed EMI Classics into Warner Classics in 2013.

Classical recordings were formerly simultaneously released under several combinations of EMI, Angel, Seraphim, Odeon, Columbia, His Master's Voice, and other labels, in part because competitors own these names in various countries. These were moved under the EMI Classics umbrella to avoid the trademark problems. Prior to this, compact discs distributed globally bore the Angel Records recording angel logo that EMI owned globally. Releases created for distribution in specific countries continued to be distributed under the historical names, with the exception of Columbia, since EMI had sold the Columbia name to Sony Music Entertainment. The red logo harkens back to the "Red Label" releases, introduced by EMI predecessor the Gramophone Company in 1902: "His Master's Voice" classical releases were issued with red labels. EMI Classics was also responsible for managing Pye Records' classical recordings acquired by Thorn EMI in 1990.

EMI Classics also included the Virgin Classics label, both of them were formerly managed under The Blue Note Label Group in the U.S. until 2013.

With the sale of EMI Music Group to Universal Music Group in 2012, European regulators forced Universal Music Group to divest itself of EMI Classics, which was operated with other European EMI assets to be divested as the Parlophone Label Group. In February 2013, Universal Music Group sold the Parlophone Label Group, including EMI Classics and Virgin Classics, to Warner Music Group. The European Union approved the deal on May, and Warner Music Group took control of the label on 1 July. It was then announced that the EMI Classics artist roster and catalogue would be absorbed into the Warner Classics label and Virgin Classics would be absorbed into Erato Records.

== Artists ==
=== Composers ===
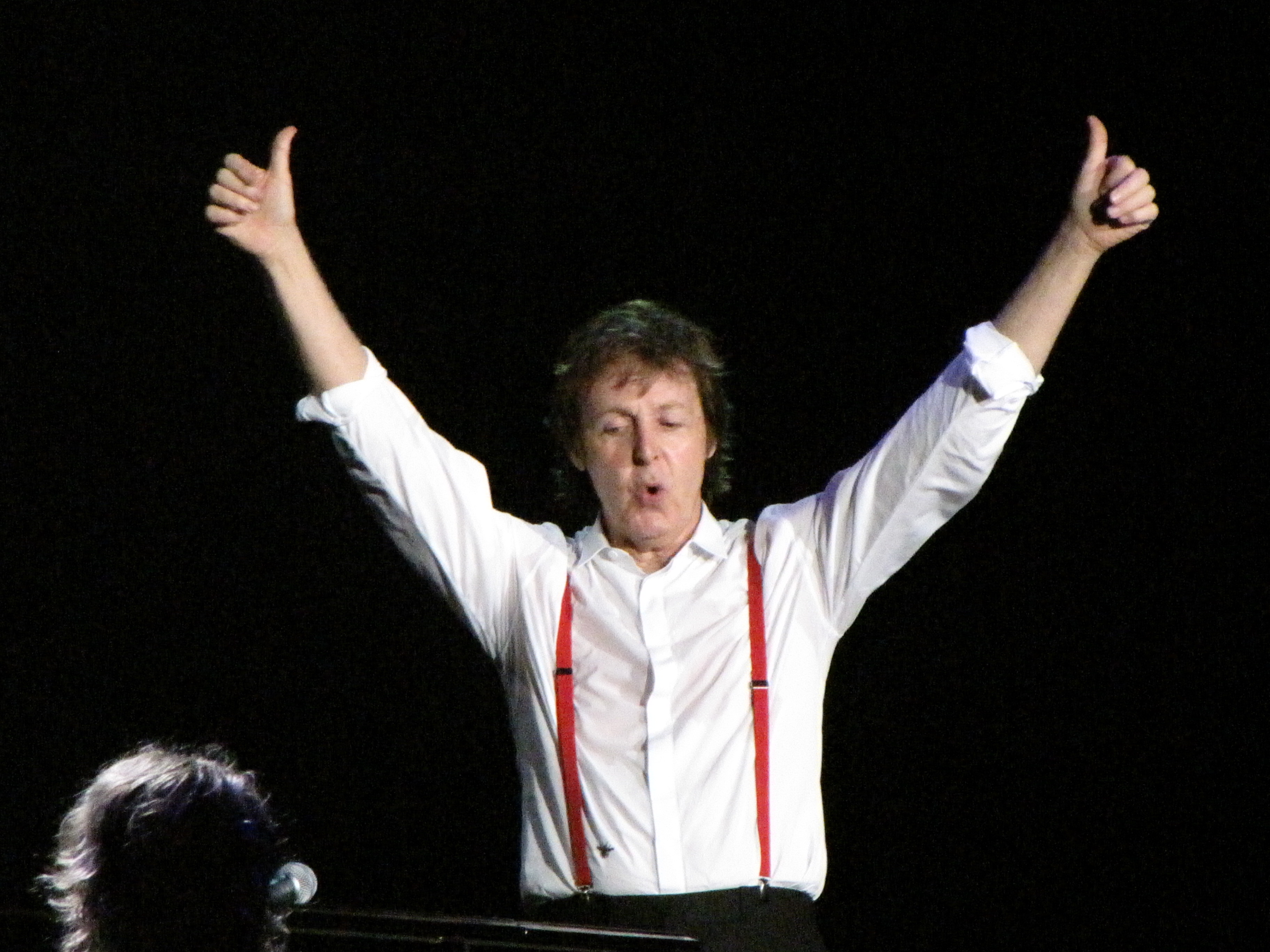
Sir Paul McCartney in concert

- Thomas Adès
- Craig Armstrong
- Howard Goodall
- Karl Jenkins
- Jon Lord
- Sir Paul McCartney
- Wim Mertens
- Michael Nyman
- Zbigniew Preisner
- John Rutter
- John Tavener
- Michael Tippett
- Mohammed Abdel Wahab

=== Conductors ===
- Claudio Abbado
- Sir John Barbirolli
- Daniel Barenboim
- Sir Thomas Beecham
- Sir Adrian Boult
- William Christie
- Alan Curtis
- Lawrence Foster
- Wilhelm Furtwängler
- Carlo Maria Giulini
- Emmanuelle Haïm
- Bernard Haitink
- Vernon Handley
- Daniel Harding
- Richard Hickox
- Mariss Jansons
- Paavo Järvi
- Herbert von Karajan
- Rudolf Kempe
- Otto Klemperer
- John Lanchbery
- Sir Charles Mackerras

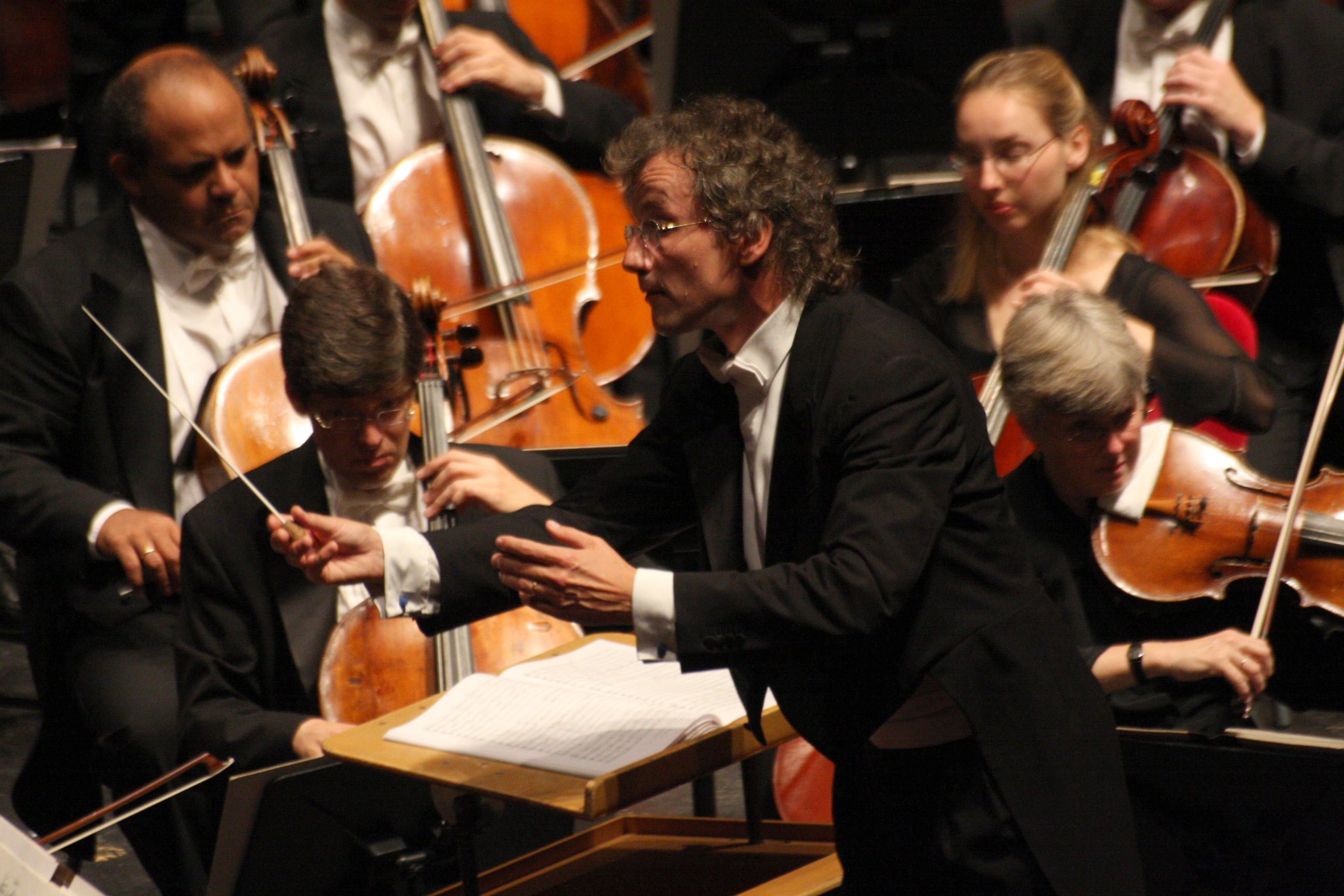
Austrian conductor Franz Welser-Möst, music director of the Cleveland Orchestra.

- Sir Neville Marriner
- Jean Martinon
- Kurt Masur
- Ingo Metzmacher
- Riccardo Muti
- Sir Roger Norrington
- Sir Antonio Pappano
- Michel Plasson
- André Previn
- Sir John Pritchard
- Sir Simon Rattle
- Jérémie Rhorer
- Wolfgang Sawallisch
- Jeffrey Tate
- Franz Welser-Möst
- Sir David Willcocks

=== Chamber ensembles ===
- Ahn Trio
- L'Arpeggiata
- Artemis Quartet
- Alban Berg Quartett
- Belcea Quartet
- Eroica Trio
- Quatuor Ébène
- Wiener Stringsextet

- Libera

=== Choirs and vocal ensembles ===
- Cantorion
- Choir of Clare College Cambridge
- Choir of King's College, Cambridge
- Christ Church Cathedral Choir, Oxford
- John Alldis Choir
- Kindred Spirits
- The King's Singers
- Royal Liverpool Philharmonic Choir
- Rundfunkchor Berlin
- Westminster Abbey Choir
- Winchester Cathedral Choir

- Libera

=== Orchestras ===
- Academy of St. Martin in the Fields
- Les Arts Florissants
- Berliner Philharmoniker
- Le Cercle de l'Harmonie
- Il Complesso Barocco
- Le Concert d'Astrée
- Deutsche Kammerphilharmonie Bremen
- English Chamber Orchestra
- Estonian National Symphony Orchestra
- Europa Galante
- Frankfurt Radio Symphony Orchestra
- London Chamber Orchestra
- London Philharmonic Orchestra
- London Symphony Orchestra
- Orchestre Philharmonique de Monte Carlo
- Philharmonia Orchestra
- Royal Philharmonic Orchestra

=== Instrumentalists ===
==== Piano ====
- Simon Trpčeski
- Leif Ove Andsnes
- Piotr Anderszewski
- Martha Argerich
- Daniel Barenboim
- Michel Béroff
- Jonathan Biss
- Youri Egorov
- Ingrid Fliter
- David Fray
- Evgeny Kissin
- Stephen Kovacevich
- Li Yundi
- Dong-Hyek Lim
- Gabriela Montero
- John Ogdon
- Awadagin Pratt
- André Previn
- Anne Queffélec
- Ayako Uehara
- Lars Vogt
- Alexis Weissenberg
- HaeSun Paik

==== Violin ====
- Renaud Capuçon
- Sarah Chang
- Kyung-wha Chung
- Vilde Frang
- Jascha Heifetz (recording for His Master's Voice in the 1930s)
- Nigel Kennedy
- Sir Yehudi Menuhin

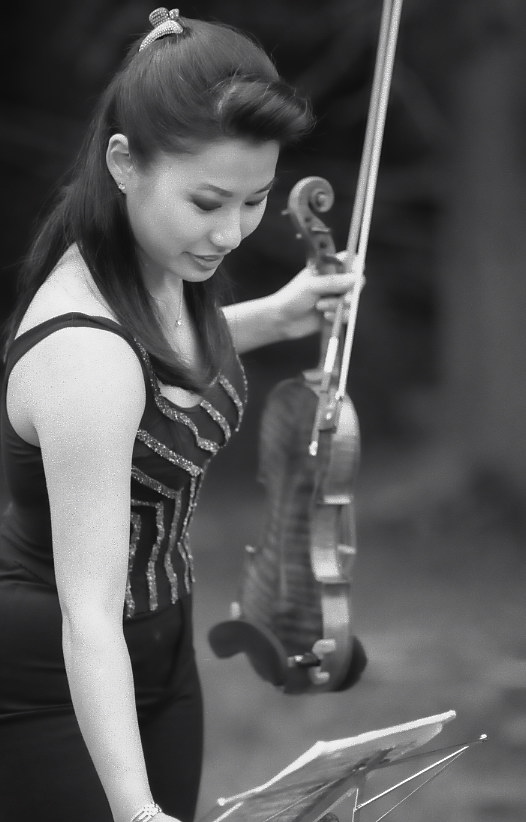
Korean American violin virtuoso Sarah Chang

- Anne-Sophie Mutter
- David Oistrakh
- Itzhak Perlman
- Nadja Salerno-Sonnenberg
- Christian Tetzlaff
- Maxim Vengerov
- Frank Peter Zimmermann

==== Cello ====
- Andreas Brantelid
- Gautier Capuçon
- Han-na Chang
- Natalie Clein
- Steven Isserlis
- Julian Lloyd Webber
- Jacqueline du Pré
- Truls Mørk
- Mstislav Rostropovich
- Trey Lee Chui-yee
- Robert Cohen

==== Trumpet ====
- Maurice André
- Ole Edvard Antonsen
- Alison Balsom
- Markus Stockhausen

==== Guitar ====
- Manuel Barrueco
- Xuefei Yang

==== Oboe ====
- Christoph Hartmann

==== Clarinet ====
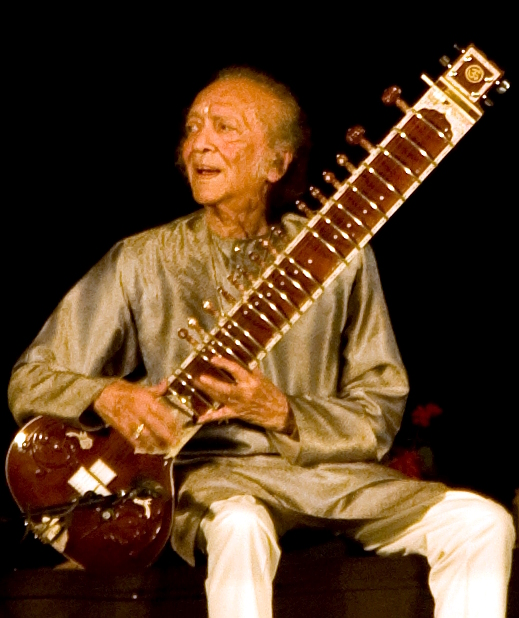
Celebrated Indian sitarist and composer Ravi Shankar

- Sabine Meyer

==== Flute ====
- Emmanuel Pahud
- Ransom Wilson

==== Organ ====
- Naji Hakim

==== Sitar ====
- Purbayan Chatterjee
- Anoushka Shankar
- Ravi Shankar

=== Singers ===
==== Soprano ====
- Elly Ameling
- Maria Callas
- Patrizia Ciofi
- Diana Damrau
- Natalie Dessay
- Véronique Gens
- Angela Gheorghiu
- Barbara Hendricks
- Ruth Ann Swenson
- Natasha Marsh
- Mady Mesplé
- Kate Royal
- Dame Elisabeth Schwarzkopf
- Dame Kiri Te Kanawa
- Liping Zhang

==== Mezzo-soprano ====
- Dame Janet Baker
- Joyce DiDonato
- Fairuz
- Christa Ludwig
- Réjane Magloire

==== Contralto ====
- Kathleen Ferrier
- Umm Kulthum

==== Countertenor ====
- Max Emanuel Cenčić
- David Daniels
- Philippe Jaroussky
- Gérard Lesne

==== Tenor ====
- Roberto Alagna
- Alfie Boe
- Ian Bostridge
- Franco Corelli
- George Dalaras

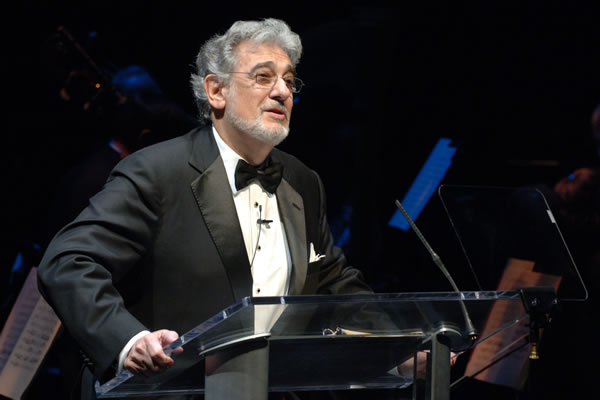
Spanish tenor and conductor José Plácido Domingo Embil, better known as Plácido Domingo

- Plácido Domingo
- Abdel Halim Hafez
- Simon O'Neill
- Rolando Villazón

==== Baritone ====
- Olaf Bär
- Thomas Hampson

==== Bass ====
- Jonathan Lemalu
- Willard White

=== Crossover acts ===
- Keedie Babb
- Sarah Brightman
- Celtic Tenors
- Celtic Woman
- Keith Emerson
- Giorgia Fumanti
- Lesley Garrett
- Jane Gilchrist
- John Wilson Orchestra

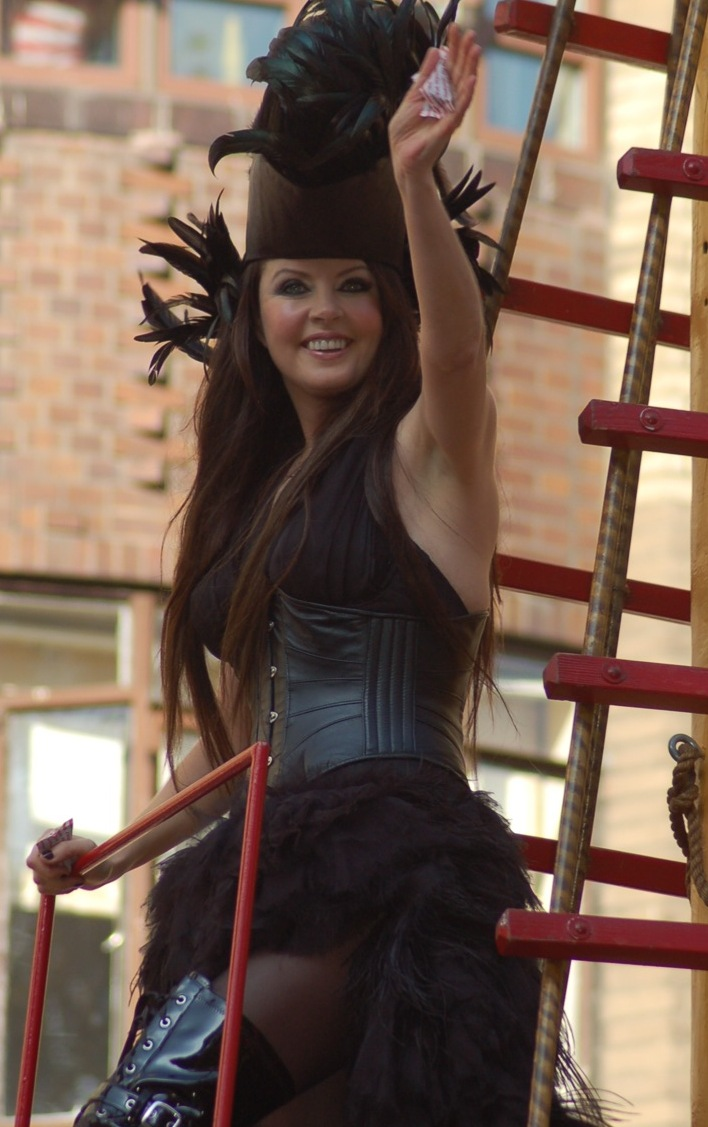
English crossover soprano Sarah Brightman

- Myleene Klass
- Libera
- Mediæval Bæbes
- Maksim Mrvica
- Nigel Kennedy Quintet
- The Planets
- Anoushka Shankar
- Vanessa-Mae
- Wild

== Catalogue series ==
- 100 Best (6-CD budget series)
- 20th Century Classics series (2-CD)
- American Classics
- Black Boxes (Virgin Classics 5-CD budget series)
- British Composers
- Debut (developing artist series)
- Encore (1-CD budget series)
- EMI Masters
- EMI – The Home of Opera
- Gemini (2-CD mid-price series)
- Great Artists of the Century
- Great Recordings of the Century
- Historical (series of public domain recordings)
- ICON series
- The Karajan Collection
- The Klemperer Legacy
- Legend (CD+DVD series)
- Maria Callas Edition
- Opera Series (budget opera series without libretto)
- The Perlman Edition
- The Platinum Collection (3-CD budget series from EMI UK)
- Recommends Series (Gramophone / Penguin Guide recommended series from EMI UK)
- Références (historical series from EMI France)
- Rouge et Noir (2-CD mid price series from EMI France)
- The Classics (Virgin Classics budget series)
- Triples (3-CD budget series)
- Veritas (Virgin Classics original instrument recordings)
- Virgin de Virgin
- Virgo (Virgin Classics budget series)

== See also ==
- Lists of record labels
