= DeRogatis =

DeRogatis is a surname. Notable people with the surname include:

- Al DeRogatis (1927–1995), American football player and sports announcer
- Jim DeRogatis (born 1964), American music critic and professor
- Teresa de Rogatis (1893–1979), Italian composer, guitarist, pianist and music teacher
