= Amazon Lumberyard =

Cross-platform triple-A game engine

- Developer: Amazon Game Tech
- Preview release: Beta 1.28 / May 19, 2021; 5 years ago
- Written in: C++, Lua, Python
- Operating system: Microsoft Windows, Linux
- Platform: Microsoft Windows; PlayStation 4; Xbox One
- Predecessor: CryEngine
- Successor: Open 3D Engine
- License: Proprietary (source-available)
- Website: aws.amazon.com/lumberyard
- Repository: github.com/aws/Lumberyard/

Amazon Lumberyard is a now-superseded freeware cross-platform game engine developed by Amazon and based on CryEngine (initially released in 2002), which was licensed from Crytek in 2015.

In July 2021, Amazon and the Linux Foundation announced that parts of the engine would be used to create a new open source game engine called Open 3D Engine, which would replace it. A new Open 3D Foundation, run by the Linux Foundation, will manage the new engine, which will be licensed under the open source Apache 2.0 license. The new engine is reportedly partially based on Lumberyard but with many parts rewritten, and is considered a new engine.

== Features ==
The Lumberyard engine features integration with Amazon Web Services to allow developers to build or host their games on Amazon's servers, as well as support for livestreaming via Twitch. Additionally, the engine includes Twitch ChatPlay, allowing viewers of the Twitch stream to influence the game through the associated chat, a method of play inspired by the Twitch Plays Pokémon phenomenon.

The source code is available to end users with limitations: Users may not publicly release the Lumberyard engine source code or use it to release their own game engine.

== History ==
Lumberyard launched on February 9, 2016, alongside GameLift, a fee-based managed service for deploying and hosting multiplayer games, intended to allow developers the easy development of games that attract "large and vibrant communities of fans." As of March 2018, the software is currently in beta status and can be used to build games for Microsoft Windows, PlayStation 4, and Xbox One, with limited support for iOS and Android and support for macOS being planned for future releases. Virtual reality integration was added in Beta 1.3, allowing developers to build games supporting devices like Oculus Rift and HTC Vive.

The audio solution Audiokinetic Wwise, which is used in many popular games, was added in Beta 1.0, released in February 2016.

On March 14, 2016, Lumberyard received its first update, which included support for mobile devices such as A8-powered iOS devices and Nvidia Shield, an FBX importer, and integration with Allegorithmic's texturing software Substance.

On August 16, 2017, the engine's source code was released under a source-available arrangement on GitHub, but remained under a proprietary license.

On July 6, 2021, Amazon announced it was partnering with the Linux Foundation to form the Open 3D Foundation and would be releasing a new version of Lumberyard, rebranded as Open 3D Engine (O3DE), under the Apache-2.0 open source license.

== Adoption ==
Despite being based on the architecture of Crytek's CryEngine, the engine has been developed to use many of its own custom-developed systems, some of which are in a preview mode. A few of these systems include the Component Entity System, Fur Shader, Modular Gems (which allows developers to either create their own assets or add existing assets to their games), and the Script Canvas.

A heavily modified version of Lumberyard called StarEngine is used for the development of Star Citizen and its single player spin-off Squadron 42. The game was originally developed on CryEngine 3 before switching to Lumberyard in December 2016. According to creative director Chris Roberts, the decision to switch to Lumberyard was based on its online services such as deep back-end cloud integration on Amazon Web Services and its social component with live-streaming platform Twitch.

== Games using Amazon Lumberyard ==
Title	Genre	Platform	Developer	Publisher	Release date
Shatterline	First-person shooter	Microsoft Windows	Frag Lab LLC	Frag Lab LLC	September 8, 2022
Squadron 42	Space combat, first-person shooter	Microsoft Windows	Cloud Imperium Games, Foundry 42	Cloud Imperium Games	2027*
Star Citizen	MMO, Space trading and combat, first-person shooter	Microsoft Windows	Cloud Imperium Games, Foundry 42	Cloud Imperium Games	2027/2028*
The DRG Initiative	Third-person shooter	TBA	Slingshot Cartel	TBA	Cancelled
New World	MMO	Microsoft Windows	Amazon Games Orange County	Amazon Games	September 28, 2021
Deadhaus Sonata	Action role-playing game	Microsoft Windows, Xbox One, PlayStation 4	Apocalypse Studios	Apocalypse Studios	Initially developed using Amazon Lumberyard before changing engine
The Grand Tour Game	Racing	PlayStation 4, Xbox One	Amazon Game Studios Seattle	Amazon Game Studios	January 15, 2019
Coffence	Fighting game	Microsoft Windows	Sweet Bandits Studios	Sweet Bandits Studios	October 25, 2018
Crucible	Third-person shooter	Microsoft Windows	Relentless Studios	Amazon Game Studios	Cancelled
Breakaway	MOBA	Microsoft Windows	Amazon Game Studios	Amazon Game Studios	Cancelled

== See also ==
- Amazon Games
- CryEngine
