= Lists of women in music =

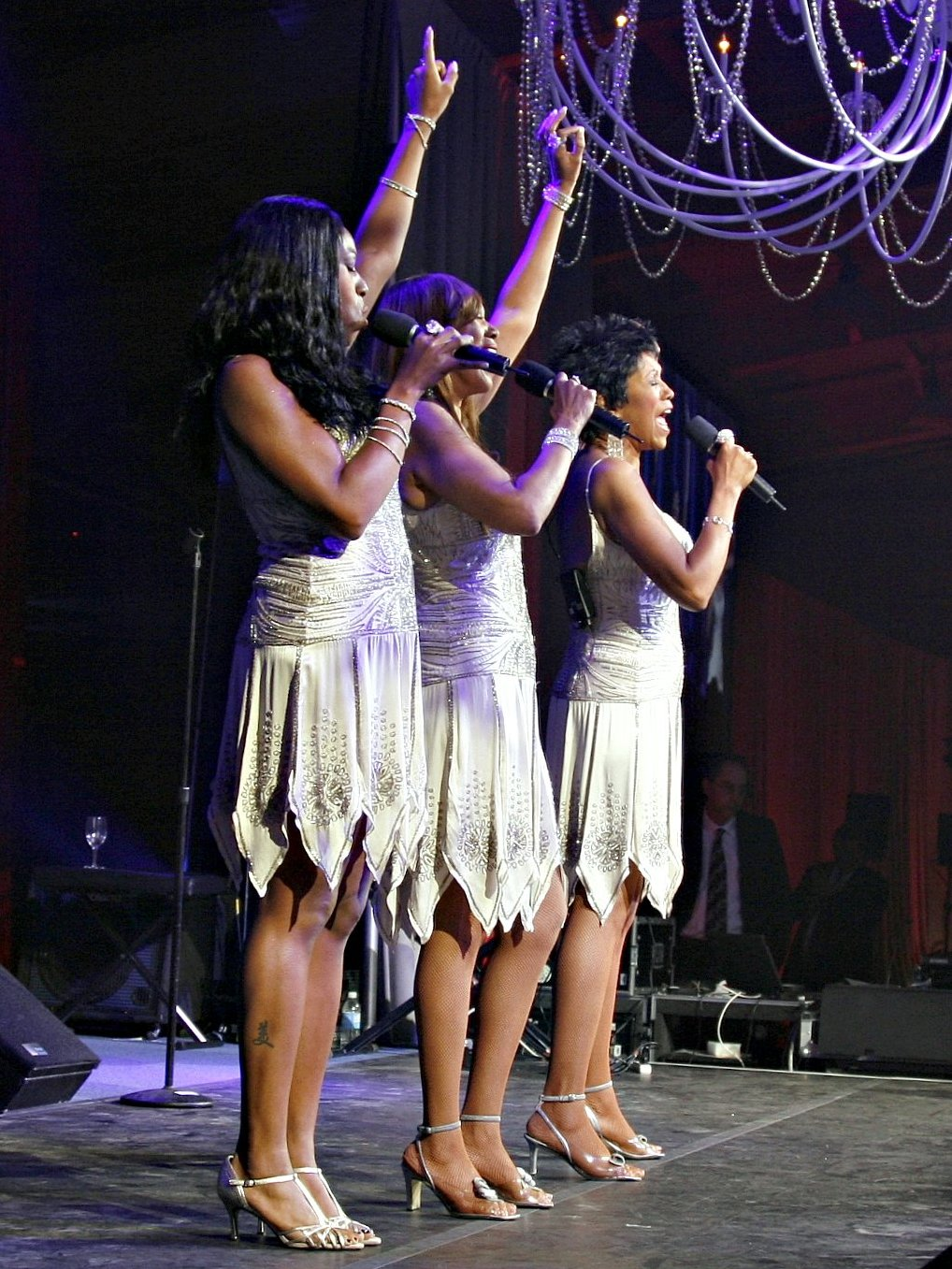
The Pointer Sisters in 2006

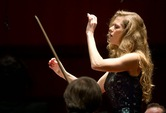
Barbara Hannigan conducting

Lists of women in music cover different categories of women in music, including composers, conductors, groups, musicians and singers. They are organized by instrument, nationality, style and so on.

== African Americans ==
- List of African-American women in classical music

== Composers ==
- List of female composers by name
- List of female composers by birth date
- List of Australian female composers

== Conductors ==
- List of female classical conductors

== Groups ==
- List of all-female bands
- List of best-selling girl groups
- List of girl groups
- List of riot grrrl bands

== Musicians ==
- List of female bass guitarists
- List of female drummers
- List of female electronic musicians
- List of female violinists
- List of women classical cellists
- List of women classical flautists
- List of women classical guitarists
- List of women classical pianists

== Singers ==
- List of AKB48 members
- List of American female country singers
- List of Bangladeshi female playback singers
- List of BNK48 members
- List of classic female blues singers
- List of contraltos in non-classical music
- List of female heavy metal singers
- List of female Lebanese singers
- List of female rock singers
- List of former members of AKB48
- List of Idol School contestants
- List of Indian female playback singers
- List of mezzo-sopranos in non-classical music
- List of Morning Musume members
- List of operatic contraltos
- List of Produce 101 contestants
- List of SNH48 members
- List of sopranos in non-classical music
- Members of JKT48
- Seven Great Singing Stars

== See also ==
- List of female dancers
- Lists of musicians
- Lists of singers
