= John Duarte =

John Duarte may refer to:

- John Duarte (politician), U.S. representative from California
- John W. Duarte (1919–2004), British composer, guitarist, and writer
