= Emily Shaw =

Emily Shaw can refer to:

== People ==
- Emily Alice Shaw, Canadian luthier
- Emily Shaw, actress from The Restaurant
- Emily Agnes, British model (birth name Emily Shaw)
- English athlete
- Wife of Edward Percival Wright
- Emily Shaw (née Oleksiuk), American soccer player

== Fictional characters ==
- A character from Doctor Who
- A character from Lady Jayne: Killer
