= Amazon Game Studios =

American video game developer

- Formerly: Amazon Game Studios (2012–2020); Amazon Games (2020–2025)
- Type: Division
- Founded: August 7, 2012; 14 years ago
- Headquarters: Seattle, Washington, U.S.
- Parent: Amazon
- Divisions: Amazon Games Bucharest; Amazon Games Orange County; Amazon Games San Diego; Relentless Studios
- Website: amazongamestudios.com

Amazon Game Studios (formerly Amazon Games) is an American video game company and division of the online retailing company Amazon that primarily focuses on publishing video games developed within the company's development divisions.

== History ==
In 2011, Amazon opened the Amazon Appstore and started to hire developers for social mobile games. In 2012, Amazon Game Studios released Living Classics, a social game for Facebook. It published third-party games for the Fire Phone, like Lost Within and Til Morning's Light and To-Fu Fury.

Amazon first announced that it would create computer games in 2014. Amazon recruited Kim Swift (Portal, who has since left for Xbox Game Studios), Clint Hocking (Far Cry 2), and developers who previously worked on System Shock 2. Amazon sought to make games in-between the industry standards of small and large teams making casual and AAA games, respectively. Amazon Game Studios wanted to make teams of five to thirty people who would work on games for between a year and 18 months with a focus on "creativity" and "craftsmanship", whether the genre is for children or hardcore gamers. Studio vice-president Mike Frazzini wanted to make projects like Minecraft, The Walking Dead, and The Room. The studio also wanted developers to impact the direction of their hardware, between its cloud services and Amazon-brand devices. For example, developers can offload processing to Amazon's cloud services and the Amazon Fire TV has expanded memory as a result of developer feedback. A lot of the company's developers left within a year of the company's founding. Amazon Game Studios went on to publish a number of mobile titles, including the horror game Lost Within.

Two years after the studio's initial announcement, at the September 2016 TwitchCon, the studio revealed its first three PC games: Breakaway, Crucible, and New World. Breakaway was a team-based brawler in which two teams of four fight to deliver a ball to their opponents' goal. It was designed for tight integration into Twitch, the streaming service Amazon acquired in 2014. Amazon Game Studios announced the cancellation of Breakaway in March 2018. Crucible was a 12-player, class-based game in which players competed to become the last man standing. Crucible was launched in May 2020, but also cancelled later that year, with Relentless Studios citing "inability to see a sustained future" as the cause. New World is a massively multiplayer sandbox game with a supernatural colonial United States theme. Players can form settlements, fight each other, or fight monsters out in the world. Crucible launched on May 20, 2020, while New World was released on September 28, 2021, after a 2nd pushback date was announced on July 10, 2020, and a 3rd on August 31, 2021. In August 2018, Christoph Hartmann, co-founder of video game publisher 2K Games – a wholly owned subsidiary of Take-Two Interactive – became the new Vice President of Amazon Game Studios working under Mike Frazzini.

In June 2019, during E3 week it was announced that layoffs hit the company. At this time it was unknown how many people were impacted. However, "multiple" unannounced projects had been cancelled. The company had been involved with a The Lord of the Rings MMO with Leyou since the middle of 2019. However, in April 2021, following Tencent's purchase of Leyou in December 2020, contractual disputes between Amazon and Tencent led Amazon to cancel further development of the game.

The company has three game development studios in San Diego, Seattle, and Orange County. In March 2021, Amazon opened a new development studio in Montreal, Quebec, led by former members of Ubisoft Montreal behind Rainbow Six: Siege, Luc Bouchard, Xavier Marquis, Alexandre Remy, and Romain Rimokh. During a major leak of Twitch's source code in October 2021, it was revealed that Amazon Games was working on a competitor to Steam, codenamed "Vapor". New World launched on September 28, 2021, reaching 707,000 concurrent players at its peak on launch day.

Lost Ark is a massively multiplayer online action role-playing game (MMOARPG) developed by Tripod Studio and Smilegate's game development subsidiary Smilegate RPG. It was fully released in the Korean region on December 4, 2018. The game was also released in North America, South America, and Europe on February 11, 2022 by Amazon Games. Within twenty-four hours of release, it became the second most played game on Steam.

On September 22, 2021, Amazon Games announced it will publish a new title from game developer Glowmade. Based in Guildford, England, Glowmade’s staff includes veterans of Lionhead Studios. This game for Amazon will be a new IP focusing on online cooperative play. In March 2022, studio head Mike Frazzini stepped down. In April 2023, Amazon Games VP Christoph Hartmann wrote a memo to staff about laying off roughly 100 employees across its video games division. In November 2023, Amazon eliminated over 180 employees, resulting in the shuttering of the Crown Twitch channel and the closing of Amazon's Game Growth team in an effort to focus Prime Gaming benefits on free games. In May 2024, Amazon Games opened its first European studio in Bucharest.

Amazon cut about 14,000 jobs company-wide in October 2025, including "significant role reductions" within Amazon Games, according to Jason Schreier of Bloomberg News. These cuts required the division to reduce work on its larger titles, including ending development of New World and turning off the servers in 2026, and focusing efforts on Luna and the publishing division. The company later sold its Montreal studio and the game it was developing March of Giants to Ubisoft in December 2025. Amazon Games boss Christoph Hartmann was exited as part of the January 2026 layoffs across the Games division as well as the company.

== Divisions ==
Game development divisions include:

- Relentless Studios (formerly Amazon Game Studios Seattle) is an American video development studio based in Seattle, Washington, which released Crucible in May 2020. The company is led by Louis Castle, co-founder of development Westwood Studios. Crucible remained in operation until it was closed in November of the same year.
- Amazon Games Orange County (formerly Double Helix Games) is an American video development studio based in Irvine, California, which released New World in September 2021.
- Other studios in San Diego, California and Bucharest, Romania.

== Amazon Games application ==
The company offers the Microsoft Windows launcher application Amazon Games since 2019, which is used to install some games redeemed from Prime Gaming.

== Technology ==
- Amazon Lumberyard
- Open 3D Engine

== Games ==
Year	Title	Developer(s)	Platform(s)	Notes
2010	Airport Mania: First Flight	Reflexive Entertainment; South Wind Games	Amazon Appstore	—N/a
2011	Airport Mania 2: Wild Trips	Reflexive Entertainment; South Wind Games	Amazon Appstore	—N/a
2012	Air Patriots	Reflexive Entertainment	Amazon Appstore	—N/a
2012	Simplz: Zoo	Reflexive Entertainment	Amazon Appstore	—N/a
2012	Lucky's Escape	Reflexive Entertainment	Amazon Appstore	—N/a
2012	Living Classics	Amazon Game Studios	Facebook	—N/a
2014	To-Fu Fury	HotGen	Amazon Appstore, iOS App Store	—N/a
2014	Tales From Deep Space	Frontier Developments	Amazon Appstore	—N/a
2014	Sev Zero	Amazon Game Studios	Amazon Appstore, Google Play, iOS App Store	—N/a
2014	The Unmaking	Amazon Game Studios	Amazon Appstore	—N/a
2015	Lost Within	Human Head Studios	Amazon Appstore, iOS App Store	—N/a
2015	Til Morning's Light	Amazon Game Studios; WayForward	Amazon Appstore	—N/a
2018	Dragon's Lair	Amazon Game Studios Seattle	Twitch Extension	—N/a
2019	The Grand Tour Game	Amazon Game Studios Seattle	PlayStation 4, Xbox One	Additional work by Heavy Iron Studios
2020	Crucible	Relentless Studios	Windows	—N/a
2021	New World	Amazon Games Orange County	Windows	Additional work by Relentless Studios
2022	Lost Ark	Smilegate RPG	Windows	—N/a
2024	Throne and Liberty	NCSoft	Windows, PlayStation 5, Xbox Series X/S	—N/a
2025	King of Meat	Glowmade	Windows, PlayStation 5, Xbox Series X/S	—N/a
2027	Tomb Raider: Legacy of Atlantis	Crystal Dynamics, Flying Wild Hog	Windows, Nintendo Switch 2, PlayStation 5, Xbox Series X/S	—N/a
2028	Tomb Raider: Catalyst	Crystal Dynamics	Windows, PlayStation 5, Xbox Series X/S	—N/a
TBA	Unannounced project	Disruptive Games	Windows, PlayStation 4, PlayStation 5, Xbox One, Xbox Series X/S	—N/a
TBA	Untitled online story-driven role-playing game.	Amazon Game Studios	TBA	—N/a

=== Cancelled games ===
Title	Developer(s)
Blue Protocol	Bandai Namco Studios
Nova	Amazon Game Studios
Intensity	Amazon Game Studios
Breakaway	Amazon Game Studios Orange County
Lord of the Rings MMO	Amazon Game Studios
Untitled The Lord of the Rings MMORPG	Amazon Games Studios Orange County
