= Chen Zhi (guitarist) =

Chinese guitar teacher and promoter

Chen Zhi (simplified Chinese: 陈志; traditional Chinese: 陳志; pinyin: Chén Zhì) is a Chinese guitar teacher (pedagogue) and promoter, who is today known for the exceptionally high level that his classical guitar students reach. He is one of China's best-known personalities of the guitar in general (not just the classical guitar).

Chen Zhi studied Mathematics and Chemistry.

Chen Zhi learned to play the guitar privately from two Russian immigrants who came to Shanghai from Belarus. He did not receive a formal institution-based (e.g. conservatory) musical education/training.

Chen Zhi played acoustic "Western" and electric Hawaii guitar and made some recordings e.g. in the early 1980s. Only thereafter, since approx. 1982 did he begin to dedicatedly focus on teaching the classical guitar, which is what he is best known for today.

== Guitar promotion in China and career ==
Today Chen is professor of classical guitar at the Central Conservatory of Music in Beijing. In 1982 he founded China's first school of classical guitar, the Chen Zhi School of Classical Guitar. In 1986 he assumed the post as council director of the China Beijing Guitar Society.

As initiator and artistic director, Chen Zhi organized the first China International Guitar Festival in 1987 and numerous events since then. He is honorary council member of the China International Culture Exchange Center.

He has hosted the radio program Classical Guitar Lesson Once a Week since 1984. Since 1993, he has hosted the China Central Television (CCTV) television program The Skill and Expression of Classical Guitar, which is broadcast three times per week. Since 1989 he has served as director, artistic instructor, and conductor of the China Broadcasting Guitar Orchestra.

Chen has written several books and many articles about the classical guitar, which were published in China.

He has lectured in Japan, Spain, Portugal, Germany and several other nations.

== Teaching ==
Chen Zhi is self-taught as teacher. 2008 marked the 50th anniversary of Chen Zhi's teaching career.

His teaching from around the 1990s is such, that based on his students' technical abilities, he is regarded as one of today's top classical guitar teachers (see Quotations below).

He primarily teaches young students (often ranging in age from 9 to 15) and some follow a formal track linking middle school, high school and conservatory; many reach a high ability at a young age. He stresses memorization and uses games, competition and rewards.

A number of his students, notably Yang Xuefei, Wang Yameng, Su Meng, Li Jie have won international competitions.

While he is well known as a teacher, Chen Zhi is himself not an advanced classical guitar player, and no concert performer. In classical guitar demonstration videos, it is always his students that play; with himself just giving explanations, transmitting basic skills, relating how to approach technical aspects, methodology, etc.

=== Phases of teaching ===
Chen Zhi notes that the guitar and teaching has been an extensive part of his life (teaching since 1958) and experimented a lot with different guitar technique and approaches. He identifies six different phases of teaching/instrumental approaches (changing various technical ideas, etc.), beginning in the 1950s with very basic rudimentary insufficient technique; through later phases in which he had contact with western concert performers (1980s), and began changing the technique he taught (e.g. with nails, different hand-position), up to the last phase, which stabilized around 1996, or later: when he slowly began to arouse increasing interest in the West, due to the high level of his students. He identifies different students who are representative of the various teaching phases.

== Publications ==
- Classical Guitar Masterpieces Playing, 古典吉他名曲指导 Performance: Li Jie - Pedagogue: Chen Zhi (Shine Horn, 先恒)
  (VCD, cover back) (info)
- 古典吉他基础教程 名师教音乐系列 古典吉他基础教程 (广东东田文化企业有限公司, Guangdong Dongtian Culture Enterprise Co., Ltd.)
  ISBN 7887240395, ISBN 9787887240392 (info, info2)
- 古典吉他技巧与表现 (info)
- Guitar Art (吉他艺术) (info, info, info)

=== Early Publications ===
- 古典吉他定级标准曲目 (info)
- 吉他广播讲座 (info, info)
- 吉他博览集 (info)
