= Chen Shanshan =

Chinese classical guitarist

Chen Shanshan (simplified Chinese: 陈姗姗; traditional Chinese: 陳姍姍; pinyin: Chén Shānshān; born November 21, 1983) is a Chinese classical guitarist. Some sources give her birth year as 1982.

Chen Shanshan has studied with Chen Zhi and toured internationally.

She has also performed in a quartet formation (Four Angels) with Wang Yameng, Li Jie, Su Meng.

== Discography ==
- La Catedral 2000 (Beijing Global Audio-Visual Publishing House 環球音像) (altern.)
- Guitar Concert in Korea by Four Angels Quartet, 2006 (Alma Guitar)

== Video ==
- Guitar Concert in Korea by Four Angels Quartet, 2006 (Alma Guitar)
