= John W. Duarte =

British composer, guitarist and writer (1919-2004)

John William Duarte (2 October 1919 – 23 December 2004) was a British composer, guitarist and writer.

== Career ==
Duarte was born in Sheffield, England, but lived in Manchester from the age of six months. He was educated at Manchester Central High School (1931–35) and the Faculty of Technology at the University of Manchester (1936–40). Duarte worked as a professional chemist, employed by the Bleachers' Association and as the chief chemist in a Ministry of Supply factory during the war. It was only in 1969 that he finally abandoned chemistry in favour of full-time dedication to music, after having been persuaded by Len Williams, father of John Williams. His only formal musical education consisted of jazz guitar lessons with Terence "Terry" Usher (1934–6); the rest he learned by self-instruction. He also worked professionally as a player of the trumpet and double bass, performing music of many kinds, and regularly worked as a jazz musician until 1953, among others in the company of Coleman Hawkins and Django Reinhardt.

Duarte taught at the London-based Spanish Guitar Centre, which Williams senior had founded and where the young John Williams studied with him for a period of three years before entering the Royal College of Music. Williams acknowledged the early influence of Duarte by including his transcriptions of Bach cello suites in his first recordings, along with Variations on a Catalan Folk Song, Op. 25, one of the most enduring and most recorded of Duarte's compositions.

He sustained several lasting friendships with great musicians, including a 39-year-long relationship with Andrés Segovia and another with Ida Presti, who died prematurely at the age of 42. Duarte edited "Tríptico" by Venezuelan guitar composer Antonio Lauro, who, in 1982, published his "Suite: Homenaje a John Duarte". Duarte also wrote a memoir of his relationship with Andres Segovia, Andrés Segovia, As I Knew Him (1998). For Presti and her husband Alexandre Lagoya, Duarte wrote Variations on a French Nursery Song, Op. 32 ("J'ai du bon tabac"), a difficult work that tested even that legendary duo's abilities. As late as 1985, Duarte wrote a piece in Ida Presti's memory, Idylle pour Ida, Op. 93, for guitar solo.

John W. Duarte died on 23 December 2004. He was survived by his wife, Dorothy, whom he married in 1943, and by two sons and a daughter.

== Music ==
Duarte was the composer of over 150 works for the guitar and lute (many commissioned with funds provided by the Arts Council of Great Britain and other sources). Most have been published and many have been commercially recorded, some several times. He also made many arrangements (several also recorded), and wrote a number of didactic works, including an introduction to harmony for guitarists.

His music shows an exceptionally wide range of styles. Duarte's English Suite, Op. 31, a three-movement work for guitar which Segovia performed and recorded, reflects the Renaissance style of court lutenists such as John Dowland and John Johnson. Dreams, Op. 91, written for the Amsterdam Guitar Trio alternates in style between aleatory, atonal and graphic, contained within a conventionally notated framework and allowing spontaneous reaction between the performers. In many other works he employs a tonal language, often coloured by the folk music traditions of various nations, and romantic in mood. "This versatility puzzled some commentators, who found difficulty in perceiving the true Duarte. But this was, in fact, the true Duarte, never easy to categorise, always unpredictable, his agile and fertile mind able and willing to leap without apparent effort from one area of music to another." His works have appeared on three Grammy award-winning albums, by Sharon Isbin and Berta Rojas.

Other than the English Suite, Duarte's Variations On A Catalan Folksong and his arrangements of Bach's Cello Suites also achieved more widespread popularity. One of his final major works was the Round O. Variations on a theme of Henry Purcell, Op. 148 (2003). Using Henry Purcell's famous 'Rondeau' (from Abdelazer) as its theme, the piece was composed specifically for Venezuelan classical guitarist Gabriel Guillén Navarro. Over 60 different solo guitarists and ensembles have performed and recorded his music.

== Articles and publications ==
Duarte was a regular contributor to the magazine Soundboard, an interviewer, and a reviewer of books, music, concerts and recordings of many kinds (specializing in Baroque music) with Gramophone, Music Teacher and Classical Guitar, and the author of numerous concert programme notes and about 250 liner notes for records of various kinds, including those for the complete reissue of Julian Bream's recordings for RCA (28 compact discs). He received a Grammy Award for his annotation to the reissue of Segovia's recordings of 1927–39. He contributed regularly to Music in Education, Guitar Review, Guitar International, Music & Musicians, Records and Recording, and Performance, and contributed to the revised edition of The New Grove Dictionary of Music and Musicians (London: Macmillan, 2001).
