= Álvaro Pierri =

Uruguayan classical guitarist (born 1953)

Álvaro Pierri (born 1953 in Montevideo, Uruguay) is a classical guitarist. He is a professor at the University of Music and Performing Arts in Vienna.

He received his early musical education from his mother, Ada Estades and aunt, Olga Pierri, on the guitar. Later he studied with Abel Carlevaro, the composer Guido Santórsola at the Uruguayan National Institute of Musicology.

From the age of 11 he was winning prizes in international guitar competitions, including 1st Prize in the International Guitar Competition in Buenos Aires, Argentina, 1st Prize in the International Guitar Competition in Porto Alegre, Brazil, and the gold medal at 18th International Competition by France Musique/Radio France in Paris.

Pierri's debut in the USA took place in New York and received reviews like ”Mr. Pierri revealed an artistic maturity not commonly encountered", ”compared to artists as Segovia, Bream, Williams" and ”brilliant, sensitive, versatile, breathtaking" (New York Times & Continental Reviews). In 1983 he made his debut in Germany with the string soloists of the Berlin Philharmonic Orchestra, and he subsequently appeared on numerous radio and television programmes produced by the German, Austrian, Danish, Spanish, French, Canadian, Korean and Japanese Radios.

Pierri is a regular guest at the major concert halls of Europe, North and South America, and Asia. Contemporary composers such as Leo Brouwer, Guido Santórsola, Jacques Hétu, Astor Piazzolla, Abel Carlevaro, Carlo Domeniconi and Terry Riley have written major works for Alvaro Pierri.

He is a frequent collaborator with prominent chamber music figures including Astor Piazzolla, Frank Peter Zimmermann, Ernö Sebastien, Régis Pasquier, Hatto Beyerle, Philippe Müller, Leo Brouwer, Alcides Lanza, Terry Riley, Tracy Silverman, Maureen Forrester, Eduardo Fernandez, the Cherubini Quartet and the Turtle Island String Quartet, and he has also worked with conductors such as Pinchas Steinberg, Charles Dutoit, Wojciech Rajski, Mario Bernardi and Yannick Nezet-Séguin.

Alvaro Pierri's CDs have been released by Metropole-Polydor (France), Blue Angel-2001 (Germany), Milan Records (Canada), Analekta (Canada), Amplitude (Canada), Madacy (Canada), HOMA (Japan) and Alpha Omega (Hong Kong). His discography includes solo recordings, chamber music, guitar concerts and electro-acoustic music. Several of his CDs have been honoured with prices and nominations, he received already twice the coveted Canadian FELIX award for the best classical CD of the year. Recently "Pioneer Classics Japan" brought out a DVD featuring Spanish and South American guitar music, and "Deutsche Grammophon" re-published a DVD with Astor Piazzolla Double Concerto, Alvaro Pierri performing in duo with Astor Piazzolla.

Alvaro Pierri is also an internationally acclaimed teacher whose students have won major international guitar competitions. He was a professor at the University of Santa Maria in Brazil and subsequently instructed classes at McGill University and the UQAM (Academy of Music) in Montreal. In 2002 he was appointed as professor at the Academy of Music in Vienna (currently known as University of Music and Performing Arts).

Pierri gives master classes at major music festivals such as the New York Manhattan Masters, GFA Guitar Foundation of America, Québec FIG, the SIG Séminaire International de Guitare in Paris and Bordeaux, in Barcelona, at the Mozarteum Summer Academy in Salzburg, the Wiener Meisterkurse, the Villa Musica in Mainz, and in Tokyo, Osaka, Seoul, and Hong Kong.

== Photos ==
- Concert Photos at Liechtensteiner Gitarrentage 2005.
- Masterclass Photos at Liechtensteiner Gitarrentage 2005.
- Some photos of LP covers (Oviatt Library Digital Collections)
