= Open 3D Engine =

Free and open-source 3D engine

- Other names: O3DE
- Original authors: Crytek, Amazon Games
- Developer: Open 3D Foundation
- Release: July 6, 2021; 5 years ago
- Stable release: 26.05.0 / 27 May 2026; 5 months ago
- Written in: C++, Lua, Python
- Middleware: Qt
- Operating system: Host: Windows, Linux, macOS (experimental); Target: Windows; Linux; Android; macOS (experimental); iOS (experimental)
- Platform: Microsoft Windows, macOS, Linux, iOS, Android
- Predecessor: Amazon Lumberyard
- Type: 3D engine
- License: Apache Software License 2.0, MIT License
- Website: www.o3de.org
- Repository: github.com/o3de/o3de/

Open 3D Engine is a free and open-source 3D game engine developed by Open 3D Foundation, a subsidiary of the Linux Foundation, and distributed under the Apache 2.0 open source license. The initial version of the engine is an updated version of Amazon Lumberyard, contributed by Amazon Games.

== Partners ==
Partners include Accelbyte, Adobe, Apocalypse Studios, Audiokinetic, Backtrace.io, Carbonated, Futurewei, GAMEPOCH, Genvid Technologies, Hadean, Huawei, HERE Technologies, Intel, International Game Developers Association, Kythera AI, Niantic, Open Robotics, PopcornFX, Red Hat, Rochester Institute of Technology, SideFX, Tafi, TLM Partners, and Wargaming.

Premier members are Adobe, AWS, Epic Games, Huawei, Intel, Microsoft, Niantic, and Tencent (with the LightSpeed Studios brand).
