= Wang Yameng =

Chinese guitarist (born 1981)

Wang Yameng (simplified Chinese: 王雅梦; traditional Chinese: 王雅夢; pinyin: Wáng Yǎmèng; born 1981 in Qingdao, Shandong) is a Chinese classical guitarist. She has studied with Chen Zhi.

She has also performed in a quartet formation, Four Angels, with Su Meng, Li Jie and Chen Shanshan.

== Discography ==
- Caprice 1999 (GHA)
- Classic Guitar - Aquarelle, Un Sueno en la Floresta 2004 (JSCP)
- Guitar Concert in Korea by Four Angels Quartet, 2006 (Alma Guitar)
