= King of Meat =

Defunct 2025 video game

- Developer: Glowmade
- Publisher: Amazon Games
- Platforms: PlayStation 5; Windows; Xbox Series X/S
- Release: October 7, 2025
- Genre: Action
- Mode: Multiplayer

King of Meat was an online multiplayer dungeon crawler video game developed by Glowmade and published by Amazon Games. The game released on October 7, 2025, for PlayStation 5, Windows, and Xbox Series X/S.

King of Meat received mixed reviews from critics, and was a commercial failure, resulting in layoffs at Glowmade. The game was shut down on April 9, 2026.

== Gameplay ==
King of Meat was a four-player player versus environment (PvE) dungeon crawler with platformer and puzzle game mechanics.

== Development ==
King of Meat was developed by Glowmade Studios and published by Amazon Game Studios. In an interview with Hardcore Gamer, Jonny Hopper, the game's lead designer, said that he was inspired by the film Labyrinth, as well as WWE.

=== Shutdown ===
On February 23, 2026, Glowmade and Amazon announced that they concluded their investment into King of Meat, the servers would be taken offline on April 9th and that all copies of the game would be refunded in the following weeks. The game was also immediately delisted from digital storefronts following the announcement.

== Reception ==
Reception

Aggregate scores
Aggregator	Score
Metacritic	(XSXS) 75/100 (PS5) 70/100 (PC) 72/100
OpenCritic	59% recommend

Review scores
Publication	Score
Hardcore Gamer	3.5/5
Shacknews	7/10

The Xbox Series X, PlayStation 5, and PC versions of King of Meat all received "mixed or average" reviews from critics, according to the review aggregation website Metacritic. Fellow review aggregator OpenCritic assessed that the game received fair approval, being recommended by 59% of critics. In concluding his review for Hardcore Gamer, Zach McKay of Hardcore Gamer wrote: "Everything is straightforward and to the point; there isn't much to do, but when done with a party, it can end up being fun. It isn't going to be a game of the year contender by any means, but the world surrounding the game is over the top and hilarious." Lucas White of Shacknews summarized the game as "a cute, welcoming multiplayer action game with a lot of challenges and interesting mechanics".

=== Sales ===
King of Meat was a commercial failure, as the management expected 100,000 concurrent players on Steam, but the game peaked at 320, resulting in around a dozen layoffs at Glowmade.
