= Li Jie (guitarist) =

- Born: 1981 (age 43–44); People's Republic of China
- Genres: Classical
- Occupation: Guitarist
- Instrument: Guitar
- Years active: fl. ca. 2000 -present
- Labels: Shine Horn, Alma Guitar
- Website: Profile on Alma Guitar

Li Jie (Chinese: 李潔; pinyin: Lǐ Jié; born 1981) is a Chinese classical guitarist.

== Biography ==
She began studying the classical guitar at the age of 11 (Chinese age) under Professor Chen Zhi. One year later, she appeared as a performer on the television program "Classical Guitar's Technique and Performance" broadcast on China's official national television station CCTV. In 1995, she enrolled in Middle School (high school) at the prestigious Central Conservatory of Music (CCM) in China.

Li Jie won the 2nd International Guitar Competition in Hong Kong in August 1998.

Li Jie was among the group of three girls, consisting of Li Jie, Wang Yameng, and Chen Shanshan, named "God's Favored Girls - Super Trio". Their consummate skills and enthusiastic attention to detail were warmly welcomed at the Beijing Music Hall and other concert venues all over China.

She has also performed in a quartet formation (Four Angels) with Wang Yameng, Su Meng, and Chen Shanshan.

Videos of Li Jie performing highly difficult classical and contemporary pieces from the VCD Classical Guitar Masterpieces can be found on Youtube.com.

== Discography ==
- Classical Guitar by Lie Jie 2002 (Shine Horn, 先恒) (altern.)
- Guitar Concert in Korea by Four Angels Quartet, 2006 (Alma Guitar)

== Video ==
- Classical Guitar Masterpieces Playing, 古典吉他名曲指导 (DVD), Performance: Li Jie - Master Teacher: Chen Zhi (Shine Horn, 先恒)
  (Classical Guitar Masterpieces Playing (VCD), cover back)
- Guitar Concert in Korea by Four Angels Quartet, 2006, DVD (Alma Guitar)
