= List of Idol School contestants =

Idol School is a South Korean reality television show.

== Contestants ==
English names are according to the official website.

Age is shown according to Korean age system.

Name	Hangul	Age	Notes
Bae Eun-young	배은영	21	Stone Music Entertainment trainee and Produce 48 contestant.
Baek Ji-heon	백지헌	15	Former Woollim Entertainment trainee and debuted as Fromis 9 member.
Sky	빈하늘	19	Former Dublekick Company trainee.
Cho Se-rim	조세림	18	Debuted in 2019 as EVERGLOW's Onda (온다).
Cho Young-ju	조영주	23	
Cho Yu-bin	조유빈	19	Debuted in 2018 as member of Pink Fantasy.
Jo Yu-ri	조유리	17	Produce 48 contestant and debuted in 2018 as member of IZ*ONE.
Chu Won-hee	추원희	19	
Hong Si-woo	홍시우	21	
Jang Gyu-ri	장규리	21	Debuted as Fromis 9 member and Produce 48 contestant.
Jung So-mi	정소미	19	
Kim Eun-kyul	김은결	13	
Kim Eun-suh	김은서	18	Former JYP Entertainment trainee and Sixteen contestant.
Jenny - Kim Joo-hyun	김주현	16	Daughter of veteran singer and chairman of Korea Singers Association Kim Heung-gook.
Kim Myong-ji	김명지	21	Former Tiny-G member.
Kim Na-yeon	김나연	22	Former JYP Entertainment trainee and Berry Good member.
Lee Chae-yeong	이채영	18	Former JYP Entertainment trainee and debuted as Fromis 9 member.
Lee Da-hee	이다희	22	Former Awe5ome Baby member.
Lee Hae-in	이해인	24	Former SS Entertainment trainee, Produce 101 contestant and I.B.I member.
Lee Na-kyung	이나경	18	Debuted as Fromis 9 member.
Lee Sae-rom	이새롬	21	Former Dancing 9 contestant and debuted as Fromis 9 member.
Lee Seo-yeon	이서연	18	Former YG Entertainment trainee and debuted as Fromis 9 member.
Jessica Lee	이슬	17	From Philippines. YouTuber and former Highteen member.
Lee Si-an	이시안	18	Stone Music Entertainment trainee and Produce 48 contestant.
Lee Yoo-jung	이유정	21	Former myB member. Current API/Ho1iday member.
Lee Young-yoo	이영유	20	Former 7 Princess member and actress and a former Woollim Entertainment trainee.
Michelle White	화이트 미셸	14	
Natty	나띠	16	Former JYP Entertainment trainee and Sixteen contestant. Debuted in 2020 as a soloist. Current KISS OF LIFE member.
Park Ji-won	박지원	20	Former JYP Entertainment trainee, Sixteen contestant and debuted as Fromis 9 member.
Park So-myeong	박소명	21	
Park Sun	박선	14	
Roh Ji-sun	노지선	20	Debuted as Fromis 9 member.
Seo He-rin	서헤린	16	Former SM Entertainment trainee and was part of the SM Rookies project.
Shin Si-ah	신시아	19	Former Dublekick Company trainee and Finding Momoland contestant.
Snowbaby	스노우베이비	22	YouTuber and Taiwanese contestant.
Som Hye-in	솜혜인	22	Fit model. Dropped out due to health problems. Later revealed to have anorexia, depression, anxiety, social anxiety and a sleep disorder. Solo debuted with a song "mini radio" in 2019, and released a second single "same here" later that year.
Song Ha-young	송하영	21	Debuted as Fromis 9 member.
Tasha	타샤	25	Singaporean-Chinese. Former Dancing 9 contestant and Skarf member.
Yang Yeon-ji	양연지	22	Former Bloomy member.
Yoo Ji-na	유지나	21	
Yoon Ji-woo	윤지우	17	

== Elimination chart ==
Color Key

Debuted as a member of fromis 9
Top 9 of the week
Eliminated
Left the show

Name	Basic Strength Rating					Ranking									
Name	Vocal	Dance	Physical	Total	Ranking	EP1	EP2	EP3	EP4	EP5	EP6	EP7	EP9	EP11	Final
Roh Ji-sun	6.5	7	6.5	6.67	11	23	22	21	13	2	1	3	1	1	
Song Ha-young	8.6	5.9	9.8	8.1	4	7	1	1	4	1	9	1	2	2	
Lee Sae-rom	5	5.1	8.7	6.27	15	13	8	9	9	9	5	2	4	3	
Lee Chae-young	8.5	8.5	7.5	8.17	3	3	3	3	5	8	12	8	5	4	
Lee Na-kyung	2.1	3.2	3.3	2.87	32	14	9	11	8	4	3	5	7	5	
Park Ji-won	7.9	5	3.5	6.37	13	5	4	6	6	7	8	4	10	6	
Lee Seo-yeon	6.1	6.3	2	4.8	19	11	11	7	3	6	4	6	3	7	
Baek Ji-heon	1.2	5.8	2.7	3.23	29	9	6	4	1	3	2	10	8	8	
Jang Gyu-ri	7.2	7.1	7	7.1	7	28	25	15	20	13	11	13	9	9	
Yoo Ji-na	2	3.3	0.4	1.9	38	17	12	8	7	10	6	7	11	10	Eliminated
Lee Hae-in	1	8.4	1.8	3.73	25	1	2	2	2	5	10	9	6	11	Eliminated
Park So-myeong	4.2	5.3	3	4.17	23	27	18	16	16	11	6	11	12	12	Eliminated
Natty	9.8	8	8.1	8.63	1	2	5	5	10	16	16	17	14	13	Eliminated
Kim Eun-suh	6.3	6.9	10	7.73	5	20	14	14	12	14	14	16	16	14	Eliminated
Jo Yu-ri	1.3	2.2	5.9	3.13	30	8	7	10	11	12	13	15	18	15	Eliminated
Lee Si-an	1.5	2	1	1.5	39	15	19	18	21	18	22	21	13	16	Eliminated
Sky / Bin Ha-neul	4	5.4	6.1	5.17	18	12	17	20	24	24	25	19	17	17	Eliminated
Bae Eun-young	7	9.3	3.5	6.6	12	22	13	12	14	15	17	14	15	18	Eliminated
Shin Si-ah	5.6	5.6	1.5	4.23	22	19	23	27	23	23	19	20	19	Eliminated	
Kim Na-yeon	8.3	6	6.4	6.9	10	40	36	38	28	26	21	12	20	Eliminated	
Chu Won-hee	5.7	7.4	5	6.03	16	10	16	17	17	20	23	27	21	Eliminated	
Seo He-rin	6	5.5	2.4	4.63	21	4	10	13	15	17	15	25	22	Eliminated	
Tasha	8	9.5	8	8.5	2	39	24	25	26	25	27	26	23	Eliminated	
Lee Da-hee	6.4	4.9	4.9	5.4	17	35	38	31	29	30	26	18	24	Eliminated	
Cho Young-joo	2.2	3.1	0.8	2.03	36	36	29	26	18	19	20	22	25	Eliminated	
Lee Yoo-jeong	5.8	6.2	9	7	9	25	26	23	25	22	24	23	26	Eliminated	
Kim Myung-ji	5.5	7.9	8.2	7.2	6	21	20	22	19	21	18	24	27	Eliminated	
Jenny / Kim Joo-hyun	3.3	4.2	1.7	3.07	31	32	31	36	31	32	28	28	28	Eliminated	
Cho Yu-bin	5.9	9	4	6.3	14	18	28	28	30	28	29	Eliminated			
Park Sun	9.5	6.1	5.5	7.03	8	24	21	24	22	27	30	Eliminated			
Kim Eun-kyul	1.4	3.5	2.3	2.4	35	6	15	19	27	29	31	Eliminated			
Lee Young-yoo	3.5	5.7	2.9	4.03	24	16	27	29	32	31	32	Eliminated			
Snowbaby	2.5	2.6	0.7	1.93	37	34	32	32	33	Eliminated					
Michelle White	4.5	4.5	1.2	3.4	28	30	33	35	34	Eliminated					
Jessica / Lee Seul	3	3.9	1.2	2.7	33	33	34	33	35	Eliminated					
Jung So-mi	1.1	1	0.9	1	40	31	37	40	36	Eliminated					
Yoon Ji-woo	3.4	2.6	0.6	2.53	34	26	30	30	37	Eliminated					
Yang Yeon-ji	4.9	7.5	1.6	4.67	20	38	35	34	38	Eliminated					
Hong Si-woo	4.4	3	3.2	3.53	26	41	39	39	39	Eliminated					
Cho Se-rim	4.3	4	2.1	3.47	27	37	40	37	40	Eliminated					
Som Hye-in	0	0	0	0	41	29	Left the show								

- In episode 4, The members of the Yukhoe Rice Team each won an Individual Ranking +1.
- In episode 6, The members of the Ji! Seo! He!, Hush Team, By Collecting Dreams and Forever Love Team each won an Individual Ranking +3. Park So-myeong won Individual Ranking of +6 as Most Improved Student, hence she was tied 6th with Yoo Ji-na who had no ranking boosts.
- In episode 7, Song Ha-young and Lee Sae-rom won the 2nd live and Individual Ranking +1.

== Debut Diagnostic Exam 1 (Episodes 3-4) ==
The members of the Yukhoe Rice team each won an Individual Ranking +1 card that is automatically in play during the final voting, and a video call to their families.

Color Key

Leader
Killing Part
Both

Team Name	Artist	Song	Position	Name	Individual Votes	Team Votes			Team Ranking
Team Name	Artist	Song	Position	Name	Individual Votes	Total Individual Votes	Live Team Votes	Total Team Votes	Team Ranking
Purity	GFRIEND	"Me Gustas Tu"	Main Vocal	Lee Da-hee	15	270	63	333	3
Purity	GFRIEND	"Me Gustas Tu"	Sub-Vocal 1	Seo He-rin	60	270	63	333	3
Purity	GFRIEND	"Me Gustas Tu"	Sub-Vocal 2	Natty	57	270	63	333	3
Purity	GFRIEND	"Me Gustas Tu"	Sub-Vocal 3	Park So-myeong	32	270	63	333	3
Purity	GFRIEND	"Me Gustas Tu"	Sub-Vocal 4	Jessica / Lee Seul	9	270	63	333	3
Purity	GFRIEND	"Me Gustas Tu"	Sub-Vocal 5	Bae Eun-young	29	270	63	333	3
Purity	GFRIEND	"Me Gustas Tu"	Sub-Vocal 6	Jang Gyu-ri	32	270	63	333	3
Purity	GFRIEND	"Me Gustas Tu"	Sub-Vocal 7	Yoo Ji-na	35	270	63	333	3
Yukhoe Rice	Blackpink	"Whistle"	Main Vocal	Park Ji-won	57	286	81	367	1
Yukhoe Rice	Blackpink	"Whistle"	Sub-Vocal 1	Lee Seo-yeon	36	286	81	367	1
Yukhoe Rice	Blackpink	"Whistle"	Sub-Vocal 2	Lee Hae-in	68	286	81	367	1
Yukhoe Rice	Blackpink	"Whistle"	Sub-Vocal 3	Lee Sae-rom	37	286	81	367	1
Yukhoe Rice	Blackpink	"Whistle"	Sub-Vocal 4	Jo Yu-ri	40	286	81	367	1
Yukhoe Rice	Blackpink	"Whistle"	Sub-Vocal 5	Hong Si-woo	0	286	81	367	1
Yukhoe Rice	Blackpink	"Whistle"	Rapper 1	Lee Young-yoo	13	286	81	367	1
Yukhoe Rice	Blackpink	"Whistle"	Rapper 2	Kim Myung-ji	35	286	81	367	1
AHAT (Ice+Hot)	Twice	"Cheer Up"	Main Vocal	Shin Si-a	53	265	58	323	4
AHAT (Ice+Hot)	Twice	"Cheer Up"	Sub-Vocal 1	Lee Na-kyung	32	265	58	323	4
AHAT (Ice+Hot)	Twice	"Cheer Up"	Sub-Vocal 2	Lee Chae-young	33	265	58	323	4
AHAT (Ice+Hot)	Twice	"Cheer Up"	Sub-Vocal 3	Song Ha-young	45	265	58	323	4
AHAT (Ice+Hot)	Twice	"Cheer Up"	Sub-Vocal 4	Kim Eun-suh	36	265	58	323	4
AHAT (Ice+Hot)	Twice	"Cheer Up"	Sub-Vocal 5	Tasha	14	265	58	323	4
AHAT (Ice+Hot)	Twice	"Cheer Up"	Sub-Vocal 6	Sky / Bin Ha-neul	41	265	58	323	4
AHAT (Ice+Hot)	Twice	"Cheer Up"	Sub-Vocal 7	Jenny / Kim Joo-hyun	11	265	58	323	4
Bebley	Red Velvet	"Rookie"	Main Vocal	Kim Na-yeon	52	257	19	276	5
Bebley	Red Velvet	"Rookie"	Sub-Vocal 1	Park Sun	14	257	19	276	5
Bebley	Red Velvet	"Rookie"	Sub-Vocal 2	Lee Yoo-jung	34	257	19	276	5
Bebley	Red Velvet	"Rookie"	Sub-Vocal 3	Chu Won-hee	68	257	19	276	5
Bebley	Red Velvet	"Rookie"	Sub-Vocal 4	Michelle White	11	257	19	276	5
Bebley	Red Velvet	"Rookie"	Sub-Vocal 5	Jung So-mi	14	257	19	276	5
Bebley	Red Velvet	"Rookie"	Sub-Vocal 6	Kim Eun-kyul	6	257	19	276	5
Bebley	Red Velvet	"Rookie"	Sub-Vocal 7	Baek Ji-heon	58	257	19	276	5
First Love	Lovelyz	"Ah-Choo"	Main Vocal	Yoon Ji-woo	37	261	74	335	2
First Love	Lovelyz	"Ah-Choo"	Sub-Vocal 1	Cho Young-joo	8	261	74	335	2
First Love	Lovelyz	"Ah-Choo"	Sub-Vocal 2	Yang Yeon-ji	20	261	74	335	2
First Love	Lovelyz	"Ah-Choo"	Sub-Vocal 3	Lee Si-an	49	261	74	335	2
First Love	Lovelyz	"Ah-Choo"	Sub-Vocal 4	Cho Yu-bin	27	261	74	335	2
First Love	Lovelyz	"Ah-Choo"	Sub-Vocal 5	Roh Ji-sun	99	261	74	335	2
First Love	Lovelyz	"Ah-Choo"	Sub-Vocal 6	Snowbaby	13	261	74	335	2
First Love	Lovelyz	"Ah-Choo"	Sub-Vocal 7	Cho Se-lim	8	261	74	335	2

== Debut Diagnostic Exam 2 (Episodes 5-6) ==
Color Key

Leader
Killing Part
Leader and Killing Part
Winner

Team Name (Class)	Artist	Song	Ranking	Name	Academic Achievement Level	
Team Name (Class)	Artist	Song	Ranking	Name	Individual	Team Average
Mr. Mr. (Advanced Performance A)	Girls' Generation	"Mr. Mr."	1	Lee Hae-In	87.8	81
Mr. Mr. (Advanced Performance A)	Girls' Generation	"Mr. Mr."	2	Bae Eun-Young	87	81
Mr. Mr. (Advanced Performance A)	Girls' Generation	"Mr. Mr."	3	Bin Ha-Neul	85.6	81
Mr. Mr. (Advanced Performance A)	Girls' Generation	"Mr. Mr."	4	Tasha	81.1	81
Mr. Mr. (Advanced Performance A)	Girls' Generation	"Mr. Mr."	5	Lee Young-Yoo	61.8	81
Ji! Seo! Hee! (Advanced Performance B)	Girls' Generation-TTS	"Adrenaline (아드레날린)"	2	Park Ji-Won	84.7	84
Ji! Seo! Hee! (Advanced Performance B)	Girls' Generation-TTS	"Adrenaline (아드레날린)"	1	Lee Seo-Yeon	85.7	84
Ji! Seo! Hee! (Advanced Performance B)	Girls' Generation-TTS	"Adrenaline (아드레날린)"	3	Seo He-Rin	83.1	84
Hush (Intermediate Performance A)	Miss A	"Hush"	1	Lee Sae-Rom	91.4	87
Hush (Intermediate Performance A)	Miss A	"Hush"	3	Jang Gyu-Ri	83.9	87
Hush (Intermediate Performance A)	Miss A	"Hush"	2	Roh Ji-Sun	88.2	87
Hush (Intermediate Performance A)	Miss A	"Hush"	4	Kim Myeong-Ji	83.1	87
예쁘다 (Intermediate Performance B)	Seventeen	"Pretty U (예쁘다)"	1	Cho Yu-Ri	81.2	75
예쁘다 (Intermediate Performance B)	Seventeen	"Pretty U (예쁘다)"	3	Chu Won-Hee	74.3	75
예쁘다 (Intermediate Performance B)	Seventeen	"Pretty U (예쁘다)"	5	Kim Eun-Kyul	69.4	75
예쁘다 (Intermediate Performance B)	Seventeen	"Pretty U (예쁘다)"	4	Park Sun	71	75
예쁘다 (Intermediate Performance B)	Seventeen	"Pretty U (예쁘다)"	2	Cho Yu-Bin	78.5	75
꿈을 모아서 (Advanced Vocals)	S.E.S.	"Just In Love (꿈을 모아서)"	2	Shin Si-Ah	81.3	83
꿈을 모아서 (Advanced Vocals)	S.E.S.	"Just In Love (꿈을 모아서)"	1	Kim Na-Yeon	85.6	83
꿈을 모아서 (Advanced Vocals)	S.E.S.	"Just In Love (꿈을 모아서)"	3	Lee Da-Hee	80.6	83
BO$$ (Advanced Dance)	Fifth Harmony	"BO$$"	2	Song Ha-Young	82.1	81
BO$$ (Advanced Dance)	Fifth Harmony	"BO$$"	3	Lee Chae-Young	81.2	81
BO$$ (Advanced Dance)	Fifth Harmony	"BO$$"	1	Kim Eun-Suh	83.5	81
BO$$ (Advanced Dance)	Fifth Harmony	"BO$$"	4	Natty	79.1	81
Catallena (Beginners' Performance)	Orange Caramel	"Catallena"	N/A	Kim Joo-Hyun	N/A	68
Catallena (Beginners' Performance)	Orange Caramel	"Catallena"	N/A	Cho Young-Joo	N/A	68
Catallena (Beginners' Performance)	Orange Caramel	"Catallena"	N/A	Lee Si-An	N/A	68
Catallena (Beginners' Performance)	Orange Caramel	"Catallena"	N/A	Lee Yoo-Jeong	N/A	68
영원한 사랑 (Beginners' Dance)	Fin.K.L	"Forever Love (영원한 사랑)"	1	Lee Na-Kyung	85.7	80
영원한 사랑 (Beginners' Dance)	Fin.K.L	"Forever Love (영원한 사랑)"	4	Baek Ji-Heon	77.3	80
영원한 사랑 (Beginners' Dance)	Fin.K.L	"Forever Love (영원한 사랑)"	2	Park So-Myeong	79.5	80
영원한 사랑 (Beginners' Dance)	Fin.K.L	"Forever Love (영원한 사랑)"	3	Yoo Ji-Na	77.8	80

== Kakao TV Broadcasts (Episode 7) ==
Channel in Bold represents the team with highest viewership numbers, and each gets Rankings +1 card.

**Channel**	**Members**	**Topic**	**Viewership %**	**Rank**
Channel 1	**Song Ha-young & Lee Sae-rom**	**Ha X Rom's Yoga School**	19.8%	1
Channel 2	Sky / Bin Ha-neul, Tasha & Lee Hae-in	DJ Na-Sha-In	10.3%	3
Channel 3	Cho Young-joo, Lee Si-an & Lee Yoo-jung	Solitary Food Fighters	5.3%	9
Channel 4	Roh Ji-sun, Seo He-rin & Lee Da-hee	Roh-Jang-geum's Royal Dining Room	10.0%	4
Channel 5	Kim Myung-ji & Jang Gyu-ri	Super Easy! Cuisine from the Markets	5.1%	11
Channel 6	Lee Chae-young & Lee Seo-yeon	Family Fitness	13.2%	2
Channel 7	Chu Won-hee, Cho Yuri & Jenny / Kim Joo-hyun	Trivia Battles	5.2%	10
Channel 8	Shin Si-a, Kim Na-yeon & Bae Eun-young	Tramps Like Us	5.9%	8
Channel 9	Lee Na-kyung & Park Ji-won	Ah Ha PC Room!	8.9%	6
Channel 10	Natty, Kim Eun-suh & Baek Ji-heon	Challenge! Unique Guinness World Records	9.1%	5
Channel 11	Yoo Ji-na ＆ Park So-myeong	Tic-Tok Sisters	7.1%	7

== Debut Diagnostic Exam 3 (Episode 8-9) ==
Color Key

Leader
Killing Part
MVP Team

Team Name	Artist	Song	Ranking	Members	Score
Wee-Woo Team	Pristin	"Wee Woo"	4	Park So-myeong	73.0
Wee-Woo Team	Pristin	"Wee Woo"	5	Cho Young-joo	71.9
Wee-Woo Team	Pristin	"Wee Woo"	3	Lee Sae-rom	77.3
Wee-Woo Team	Pristin	"Wee Woo"	1	Lee Seo-yeon	78.9
Wee-Woo Team	Pristin	"Wee Woo"	6	Kim Myung-ji	71.6
Wee-Woo Team	Pristin	"Wee Woo"	2	Lee Na-kyung	77.5
Ooh-Ahh Team	Twice	"Like Ooh-Ahh"	1	Lee Chae-young	80.6
Ooh-Ahh Team	Twice	"Like Ooh-Ahh"	2	Natty	79.7
Ooh-Ahh Team	Twice	"Like Ooh-Ahh"	4	Song Ha-young	76.8
Ooh-Ahh Team	Twice	"Like Ooh-Ahh"	3	Park Ji-won	78.9
Ooh-Ahh Team	Twice	"Like Ooh-Ahh"	5	Jenny / Kim Joo-hyun	63.4
Step Team	KARA	"Step"	4	Shin Si-a	73.1
Step Team	KARA	"Step"	3	Sky / Bin Ha-neul	81.7
Step Team	KARA	"Step"	2	Tasha	83.2
Step Team	KARA	"Step"	1	Lee Si-an	85.6
Rough Team	GFriend	"Rough"	5	Cho Yu-ri	71.8
Rough Team	GFriend	"Rough"	3	Kim Eun-suh	75.5
Rough Team	GFriend	"Rough"	2	Lee Yoo-jung	76.3
Rough Team	GFriend	"Rough"	4	Kim Na-yeon	74.9
Rough Team	GFriend	"Rough"	1	Jang Gyu-ri	77.2
No No No Team	APink	"No No No"	4	Yoo Ji-na	75.7
No No No Team	APink	"No No No"	5	Chu Won-hee	66.8
No No No Team	APink	"No No No"	3	Lee Da-hee	76.1
No No No Team	APink	"No No No"	2	Bae Eun-young	79.5
No No No Team	APink	"No No No"	1	Roh Ji-sun	81.8
I'm Your Girl Team	S.E.S	"I'm Your Girl"	1	Lee Hae-in	77.9
I'm Your Girl Team	S.E.S	"I'm Your Girl"	2	Baek Ji-heon	72.7
I'm Your Girl Team	S.E.S	"I'm Your Girl"	3	Seo He-rin	69.8

== Final Debut Diagnostic Exam (Episode 11) ==
Performance			Contestant	
#	Director	Song	Position	Name
1	Choi Young-jun	Pinocchio (피노키오)	Main Vocal A	Park Ji-won
1	Choi Young-jun	Pinocchio (피노키오)	Main Vocal B	Park So-myeong
1	Choi Young-jun	Pinocchio (피노키오)	Sub Vocal A	Lee Na-kyung
1	Choi Young-jun	Pinocchio (피노키오)	Sub Vocal B	Yoo Ji-na
1	Choi Young-jun	Pinocchio (피노키오)	Sub Vocal C	Baek Ji-heon
1	Choi Young-jun	Pinocchio (피노키오)	Rapper	Lee Chae-young
2	Park Jun-hee	You In My Fantasy (환상속의 그대)	Main Vocal A	Jang Gyu-ri
2	Park Jun-hee	You In My Fantasy (환상속의 그대)	Main Vocal B	Cho Yu-ri
2	Park Jun-hee	You In My Fantasy (환상속의 그대)	Sub Vocal A	Lee Seo-yeon
2	Park Jun-hee	You In My Fantasy (환상속의 그대)	Sub Vocal B	Song Ha-young
2	Park Jun-hee	You In My Fantasy (환상속의 그대)	Sub Vocal C	Roh Ji-sun
2	Park Jun-hee	You In My Fantasy (환상속의 그대)	Sub Vocal D	Lee Sae-rom
3	Bae Yoon-jung	MAGICAL	Main Vocal A	Lee Hae-in
3	Bae Yoon-jung	MAGICAL	Main Vocal B	Bin Ha-neul
3	Bae Yoon-jung	MAGICAL	Sub Vocal A	Bae Eun-young
3	Bae Yoon-jung	MAGICAL	Sub Vocal B	Kim Eun-suh
3	Bae Yoon-jung	MAGICAL	Sub Vocal C	Lee Si-an
3	Bae Yoon-jung	MAGICAL	Rapper	Natty

== Notes ==
1. At the end of the elimination show on episode 4, the eliminated students were given the option to be trained separately in the "Careers Club/Normal Class" with the same teachers which may give them the chance to debut in the future. Initially, the students accepted, but all declined the offer to return later as some of those students were already approached by different entertainment companies.
2. All rankings are listed after all cards' effects are taken into account.
3. *Lee Young-yoo and Kim Eun-kyul were in different classes, but as their remaining classmates were eliminated after episode 4, so they were reassigned. Of the eliminated students, Intermediate Vocal Class was wiped out altogether. The speculated classes were not revealed on the show.
4. As the lowest score by a substantial margin, the individual scores and rankings for Catallena Team was not disclosed.
5. In episode 10, the top 18 were not revealed, only the bottom 10 that were eliminated were revealed.
