= Slingshot Cartel =

British video game developer

Slingshot Cartel LLP
- Company type: Private
- Industry: Video games
- Founded: 31 January 2017; 8 years ago
- Founders: Jamie Jackson; Gareth Morrison; Jonathan Napier; David Osbourn
- Headquarters: Leamington Spa, England

Slingshot Cartel LLP is a British video game developer based in Leamington Spa. It was founded in January 2017 by four former FreeStyleGames employees.

== History ==
Slingshot Cartel was founded by Jamie Jackson, Gareth Morrison, Jonathan Napier, and David Osbourn, four former employees of FreeStyleGames. FreeStyleGames had previously developed Guitar Hero Live for its parent company, Activision. Despite positive reviews upon its release in 2015, the game was commercially unsuccessful and Activision downsized FreeStyleGames on 1 April 2016, laying off roughly 50 staff. Jackson, Morrison, Napier, and Osbourn left the studio later that year, stating their disappointment with how typical developer–publisher interactions led to such situations. They founded Slingshot Cartel, which they announced on 31 January 2017.

The founders' experience in developing Guitar Hero Live, which used full-motion video extensively, was more in line with the traditional approach to filmmaking, where they had only a few full-time staff on the game throughout its development while bringing in other departments or outsourcing to other developers when necessary, at one point have over one thousand people involved. Jackson said that, for example, an artist for a game may only be needed 60% of the development time. Slingshot Cartel planned to apply the same principles for the development of their games to avoid the monolithic nature of traditional game development, using their experience in the industry and their range of contacts to bring in the appropriate people at the right time.

By the time of the studio's announcement, Slingshot Cartel was working on two titles, one in collaboration with Virtuos and another Leamington Spa developer. They announced their first game, The DRG Initiative, in February 2017. The studio anticipated developing titles within the growing esports field.
