= Crucible (video game) =

2020 video game

- Developer: Relentless Studios
- Publisher: Amazon Game Studios
- Directors: Colin Johanson, Jason Stansell, James Ackley, DJ Stiner, Eric Flannum, Brady Houck
- Producers: Tre Fitzgerald, Jessica Antico Brasz, Andy Abramovici
- Engine: Amazon Lumberyard
- Platform: Microsoft Windows
- Release: May 20, 2020
- Genre: Third-person shooter
- Mode: Multiplayer

Crucible was a free-to-play multiplayer third-person shooter developed and published by Relentless Studios, a subsidiary of Amazon Game Studios. It is Amazon's first major original title published by their gaming division, which had previously focused on tablet games, and began development in 2014. It became available for purchase on May 20, 2020, for Windows. The game returned to a closed beta status on June 30, 2020. On October 9, 2020, Relentless Studios announced that development would be discontinued. The game's servers shut down in November 2020.

== Gameplay ==
Crucible was a hero shooter game. Playable characters were called "hunters" and had different abilities in battle. Matches were team-based player versus player competitions, and the Alpha Hunters, Harvester Command, and Heart of Hives game modes all included player versus environment elements as well. Unlike other hero shooter games, there were no dedicated healer or tank characters, requiring all players to search for healing items during matches.

== Release ==
At launch, the game was in "pre-season" to allow developers to finetune the gaming experience. After a muted reception, the game returned to a closed beta status on June 30, with the intent to retool the game for a fresh start.

== Reception ==
Reception

Aggregate scores
Aggregator	Score
Metacritic	56/100
OpenCritic	33% recommend

Review scores
Publication	Score
Game Informer	6.75/10
GameSpot	5/10
IGN	4/10
PC Gamer (US)	48/100

Crucible received "mixed or average" reviews from critics, according to review aggregator Metacritic. Fellow review aggregator OpenCritic assessed that the game received weak approval, being recommended by 33% of critics.

== Cancellation ==
On October 9, 2020, Relentless Studios announced the cancellation of Crucible, citing the inability to see a sustained future as the reason for cancellation. The studio offered full refunds for any purchases made and was subsequently shifted to aid development of Amazon's other upcoming title, New World. Matchmaking was discontinued in late October, and custom game servers were shut down on November 9.
