= Su Meng =

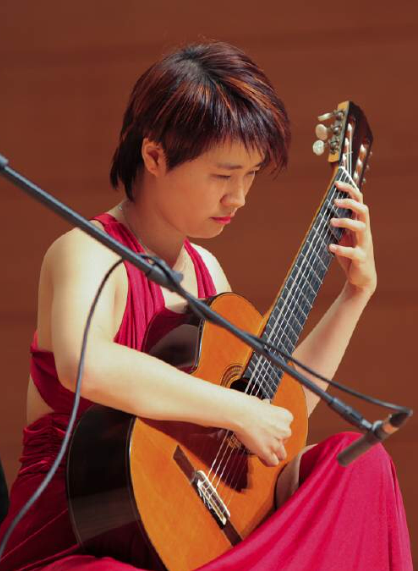
- Su Meng, 2014

Background information
- Born: 1988 (age 37–38); Qingdao, China
- Genres: Classical music
- Occupation: Musician
- Instrument: classical guitar
- Years active: 2006–present
- Member of: Beijing Guitar Duo
- Website: www.mengsu.com www.beijingguitarduo.com

Su Meng (苏萌; born 1988) is a classical guitarist. She was born in Qingdao, Shandong. She started studying classical guitar in 1997 under the tuition of Chen Zhi of the Central Conservatory of Music. In 2006 she was under full scholarship of Manuel Barrueco of the Peabody Institute of The Johns Hopkins University. She has also performed in a quartet formation with Wang Yameng, Li Jie, and Chen Shanshan (Four Angels). Currently she is concertizing as a soloist and also in duo with Wang Yameng, as the Beijing Guitar Duo.

== Competitions ==
- 2002: first prize in the 5th Vienna International Guitar Competition.
- 2005: first prize in the 48th Tokyo International Guitar Competition.
- 2006: winner of the first Parkening Young Guitarist Competition.
- 2006: winner of the first Iserlohn Guitarist Competition.
- 2014: Maryland State Art Council's Individual Artist Award in Classical Solo Performance
- 2015: winner of the fourth Parkening Guitar Competition.

== Discography ==
- Guitar Concert in Korea by Four Angels Quartet, 2006 (Alma Guitar)
- Maracaípe Beijing Guitar Duo (Meng Su & Yameng Wang) (2009), (2010 Latin Grammy Nomination for "Maracaípe" by Sergio Assad)
- Bach to Tan Dun Beijing Guitar Duo (Meng Su & Yameng Wang) (2011)
- CHINA-WEST Manuel Barrueco & Beijing Guitar Duo (Meng Su & Yameng Wang)(2014)

== Video ==
- (Guitar Concert in Korea - Live) 2005 (Alma Guitar)
- Guitar Concert in Korea by
- Four Angels Quartet, 2006 (Alma Guitar)
