= Breakaway (cancelled video game) =

Cancelled video game

- Developer: Amazon Games Orange County
- Publisher: Amazon Game Studios
- Platform: Microsoft Windows
- Release: Unreleased
- Genre: Brawler
- Mode: Multiplayer

Breakaway was a team-based, multiplayer brawler video game in development by Amazon Game Studios. The game was cancelled March 31, 2018.

== Gameplay ==
Breakaway was going to be a multiplayer brawler game in which two teams of four players attempt to move a ball (the relic) to their opponent's goal. Each team member (hero) would have some unique abilities that would aid them towards achieving these ends. Each hero could build two structures, such as turrets, healing shrines, and walls. The player could also upgrade their structures mid-game with gold earned through the match. The heroes spanned several class types—such as tanks, swordsmen, and mages—and archetypal themes (e.g., a knight and Spartacus). The game would be fought on battlefields with themes such as El Dorado and Atlantis.

The game included several features aimed to promote video game live streaming on Twitch, the service purchased by Amazon. Broadcast Match Builder invites streamer followers to games. Broadcaster Spotlight lets players know when their match is being streamed. Metastream overlays game stats atop streamer video. Stream+ lets streamers run polls and place bets with in-game currency.

== Development ==
Amazon acquired Double Helix in early 2014; they would then merge it into the company's existing Irvine operations, creating Amazon Game Studios Orange County. Two years later, Amazon announced its first computer games, including Breakaway, at the September 2016 TwitchCon.

The game combines elements of League of Legends, Power Stone and Rocket League, and is designed for easy streaming on Twitch. The developers hosted an open alpha version in December 2016. Breakaway had no set release date, although it was scheduled to be released in late 2019. On March 31, 2018, Amazon announced that, after development of the game had been in hiatus, the game would ultimately be cancelled outright—although Amazon did note that it was possible that some time in the future that development may resume if the studio finds "a thunderbolt of inspiration".

== Reception ==
Polygon was "pleasantly surprised" by the game's accessibility and depth. They were able to understand the game within an hour of coaching. Rock Paper Shotgun wrote that the game, at first, appears to be "a cacophonous trend-vomiting combination" of its forebears, but added that Breakaway had the potential to match them.
