= Teresa de Rogatis =

Italian composer, guitarist, pianist, and music teacher

- Born: 15 October 1893; Naples
- Died: 8 January 1979 (aged 85); Chiaia

Teresa de Rogatis (15 October 1893 – 8 January 1979) was an Italian composer, guitarist, pianist and music teacher. She gave her first recital at the age of seven. She toured internationally, and then settled in Cairo where she was one of the founders of the National Conservatory of Egypt. De Rogatis returned to Naples in 1963 after her husband died. Her son is also a concert pianist, and created the Teresa de Rogatis Foundation in Los Angeles.

== Biography ==
Teresa de Rogatis was born in Naples on 15 October 1893. She was seen as a child prodigy giving her first recital when she was just seven. She studied in the Conservatorio San Pietro at Majella where she graduated with honours, and gave concert tours. It was on one such tour in Egypt that de Rogatis met her husband the Swiss man Paolo Feninger. She settled in Cairo during the 1920s where she taught guitar and composition, and helped found the National Conservatory of Egypt in the late 1950s. She continued to teach and compose in Cairo until her husband died. In 1963 de Rogatis returned to live in Naples, where she continued teaching and composing. de Rogatis composed over sixty works, of which almost half are works for piano. She also composed vocal music and pieces for guitar, and a four-movement sonatina. Italian guitarist Cinzia Milani described how de Rogatis ‘reconciled brilliant virtuoso flair with an elegantly feminine touch, even when the overall tone is jocular or ironic.’

Her son Mario Feninger, is a concert pianist. He created the Teresa de Rogatis Foundation in Los Angeles, which distributes and promotes her compositions. De Rogatis died on 8 January 1979.
