= Emily Alice Shaw =

Emily Shaw
- Born: Emily Alice Shaw; Canada
- Genres: Classical music, acoustic music
- Occupations: Musician, luthier, music teacher
- Instrument: Classical guitar
- Website: https://www.emilyshawguitar.ca

Emily Alice Shaw is a Canadian luthier, classical guitarist and teacher from Ottawa, Ontario. As a luthier, she builds classical guitars, baroque guitars ukuleles and similar instruments.
