= Amsterdam Guitar Trio =

Guitar band

Amsterdam Guitar Trio is a classical guitar ensemble consisting of Johan Dorrestein, Olga Franssen and Helenus de Rijke, who met while they were students at the Sweelinck Conservatory (Sweelinck Conservatorium). Their discography includes transcriptions for Antonio Vivaldi's The Four Seasons and the Johann Sebastian Bach's Brandenburg concertos.

== Discography ==
- Vivaldi: The Four Seasons (1983)
- J.S. Bach: Brandenburg Concertos Nos. 2, 3, 5, 6 (1985)
- Amsterdam Guitar Trio Plays Music by Debussy, Fauré, & Chopin (1988)
- Fandango (1991)
- Domenico Scarlatti: Sonatas for three Guitars (1993)
- Brandenburg Ctos 2 & 3 & 5 & 6 / Suite Bergamasque (Double album compiling the 1985 and 1988 releases, 2012)
