= Olga Pierri =

Uruguayan guitarist, teacher

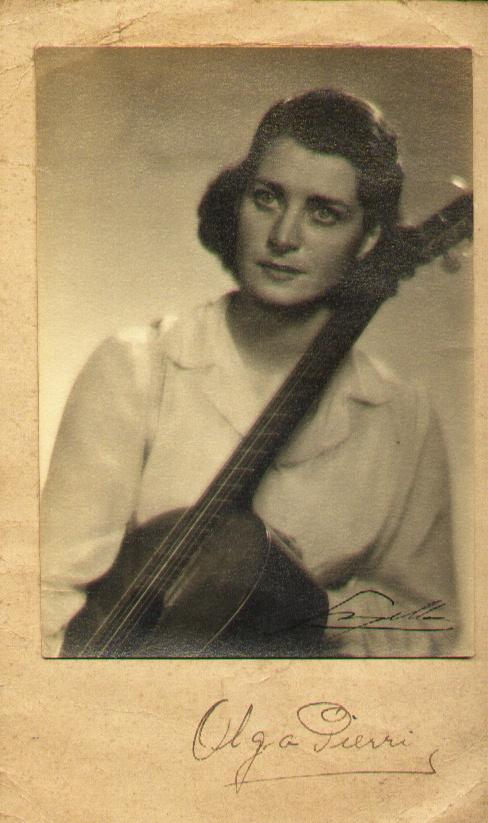
- Olga Pierri around 1950
- Born: June 3, 1914
- Died: September 28, 2016 (aged 102); Montevideo
- Occupations: Guitarist and educator

Olga Pierri (3 June 1914 – 28 September 2016) was an Uruguayan guitarist and teacher. She received musical instruction from her father, José Pierri Sapere, and in 1937 co-founded the Uruguayan Guitar Center, playing in its inaugural concert with Abel and Agustín Carlevaro, and with Atilio Rapat, with whom she played in a duo.

== Biography ==
From a young age, Olga Pierri had an interest in music, as her father, José Pierri Sapere, was himself a noted guitarist. Mr. Pierri gave Olga her first lessons in not just his own methods, but those of Pascual Roch. She was influenced by other such musicians as Atilio Rapat, Julio Martínez Oyanguren, and Agustín Carlevaro, with whom Pierri would become a close friend.

In 1948, Pierri formed an all-female group of four to five members that could throughout its run count among its members Pierri herself, Teté Richi, Margot Prieto, and Margarita Quadros. The group's music, written by Pierri, inspired by Uruguayan and Latin American culture at large managed to become popular through Uruguay.

On 3 June 2016, Pierri celebrated her 102nd birthday by performing on public radio alone and with an ensemble of her best students, called "Conjunto Femenina de Guitarras."
