= Christoph Hartmann (oboist) =

German oboist (born 1965)

- Born: February 2, 1965 (age 61); Landsberg am Lech, Germany
- Genres: Classical
- Occupations: Musician, professor
- Instrument: Oboe
- Member of: Berlin Philharmonic
- Formerly of: Stuttgarter Philharmoniker

Christoph Hartmann is a German oboist.

== Career ==
Hartmann began playing the oboe at age 13, and first studied at the Leopold Mozart Centre. He subsequently studied under Günther Passin at the University of Music and Theatre Munich. He has won prizes at national and international competitions across Geneva, Tokyo, and Toulon.

He began his orchestral career with the Stuttgarter Philharmoniker. In 1992, he was appointed to the Berlin Philharmonic. In 1999, he founded the Landsberger Sommermusiken chamber music festival and serves as its artistic director.

He teaches at the Hochschule für Musik Freiburg and the Karajan Academy.

Outside of music, he is an avid cycler and marathon runner. He opened a bicycle shop (named after Italian oboist Antonio Pasculli) with a friend in 2006.
