= Xuefei Yang =

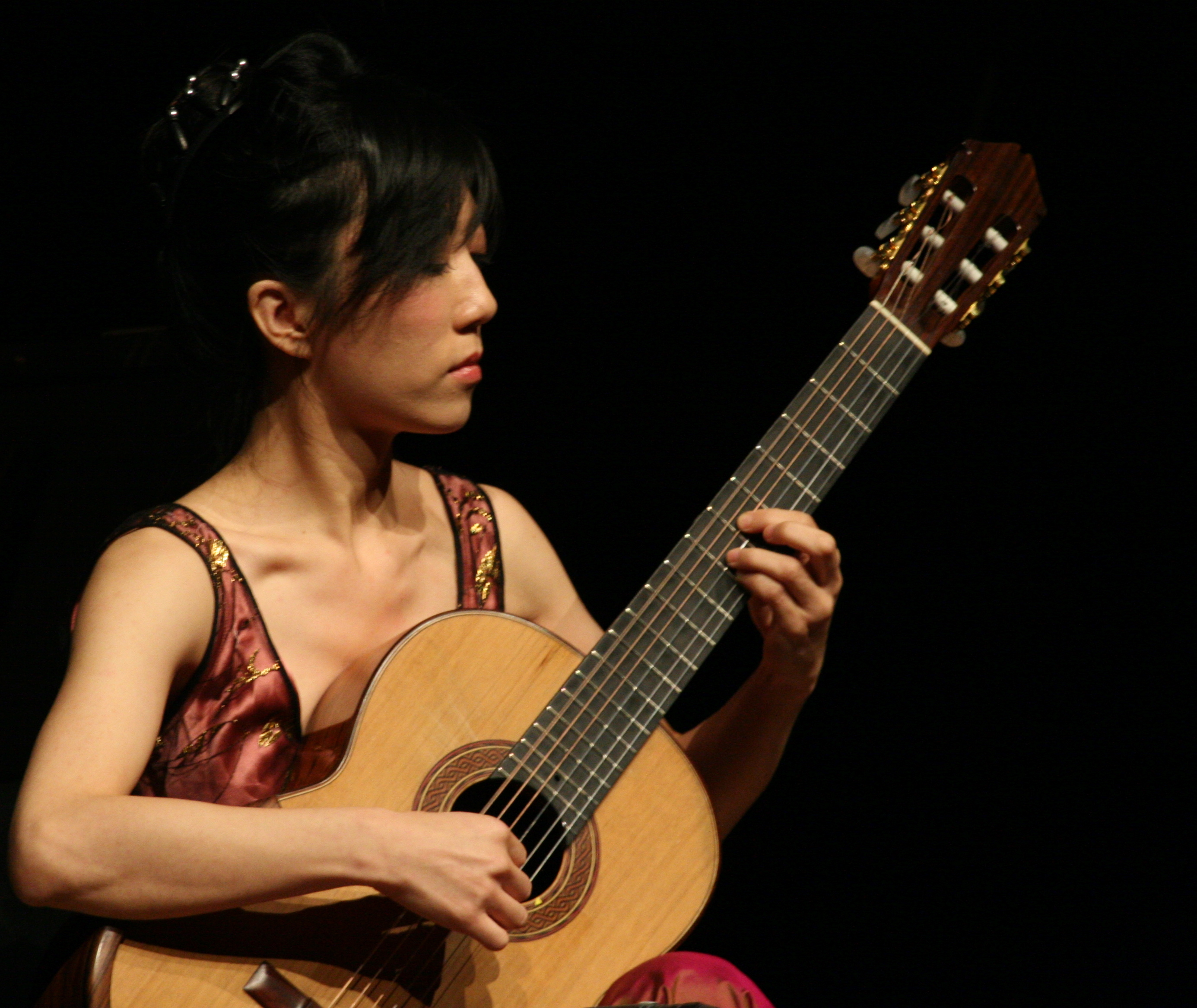
- Xuefei Yang performing the Concierto de Aranjuez in Barcelona, 2008

Background information
- Born: March 15, 1977 (age 49); Beijing, China
- Genres: Classical
- Occupation: Classical guitarist
- Instrument: Guitar
- Years active: fl. ca. 1988-present
- Labels: GSP, EMI, Decca Records, Universal Music Group
- Website: www.xuefeiyang.com

Xuefei Yang (simplified Chinese: 杨雪霏; traditional Chinese: 楊雪霏; pinyin: Yáng Xuěfēi; born March 15, 1977) is a Chinese classical guitarist acclaimed as one of the world's finest classical guitarists. Classic FM named her one of the 100 Top Classical Musicians of Our Time, and BBC Music Magazine ranks her among the Top Six Guitarists of the Century. The first internationally recognized Chinese guitarist, she has captivated audiences in more than 50 countries and is praised by Gramophone magazine as one of the leading innovators of her generation for expanding the classical guitar repertoire.

== Early years ==
Xuefei Yang was born in Beijing, China, on March 15, 1977, during a period of cultural transition following the Cultural Revolution, when Western musical instruments, including the guitar, were largely prohibited.

Yang made her public debut at age ten at the First China International Guitar Festival, where her performance earned widespread acclaim. The Spanish Ambassador to China, impressed by her talent, gifted her a concert guitar.

At fourteen, she performed her debut concert in Madrid, where the legendary composer Joaquín Rodrigo was in the audience. When John Williams heard her play, he gave two of his own instruments to Beijing's Central Conservatoire especially for her and other advanced students.

Yang broke new ground as the first guitarist in China to be admitted to a formal music school, enrolling at the Central Conservatory of Music in Beijing, where she honed her craft and laid the foundation for her international career.

== Further education ==
In 2000, Yang became the first Chinese guitarist to receive an international scholarship from the Associated Board of the Royal Schools of Music (ABRSM) to pursue a postgraduate program at the Royal Academy of Music (RAM) in London. This scholarship was the first awarded to a guitarist by the ABRSM.

In 2002, Yang graduated from the RAM with distinction, earning a Recital Diploma and receiving the Royal Academy of Music Principal's Prize for exceptional all-round studentship.

== Later career ==
Following her establishment as an international performer, Xuefei Yang's career evolved to encompass extensive global touring and repertoire development. She has performed in more than 50 countries at prestigious venues, including appearances at Carnegie Hall and the BBC Proms, and has collaborated with renowned artists such as Ian Bostridge, Johannes Moser, Roberto Alagna and Sir James Galway.

=== Repertoire expansion and cultural bridge-building ===
A defining aspect of Yang's later career has been her systematic expansion of the classical guitar repertoire through Chinese music transcriptions and cross-cultural collaborations. After moving to England and starting her professional career, Yang asked herself, "What is my identity?" leading her to embrace her role as a Chinese artist. She noted that during the Cultural Revolution, guitar was regarded as a "hooligan instrument," and there was no substantial Chinese repertoire for guitar.

Yang has developed extensive expertise in transcription work, explaining, "I like to do transcriptions. It's one way to expand the repertoire of the guitar, which I want to do." Her approach involves meticulous study, as she describes: "Like with the Bach violin concertos, I spent a lot of time really studying the score and comparing different versions." She notes that "the guitar is very versatile, and well suited to playing Chinese music, as China has a long heritage of plucked instruments."

In 2019-2020, Yang undertook a significant cultural project, giving a bigger proportion of her concert programs to Chinese repertoire, working on new transcriptions including classics, folk, and chamber pieces, and recording a whole album of Chinese music. This culminated in her 2020 album "Sketches of China," which features collaborations with traditional Chinese instrumentalists and showcases the depth and breadth of Chinese music. ArtMuseLondon described it as "a release as important as it is appealing, this masterpiece is perhaps Yang's greatest labour of love, not to mention a colossal achievement."

=== International recognition and honors ===
Classic FM named her one of the 100 Top Classical Musicians of Our Time, and BBC Music Magazine ranks her among the Top Six Guitarists of the Century. In 2012, she was awarded the Fellowship of the Royal Academy of Music, a title held by at most 300 people at any one time. She was awarded an Honorary Fellowship from the Royal Birmingham Conservatoire, with the award presented by the Principal Professor Julian Lloyd Webber, and she holds the position of International Guitar Chair at the institution.

Gramophone magazine praised her as one of the leading innovators of her generation for continuing to build the guitar repertoire. Yang has also been honored with the artistic directorship of the Changsha International Guitar Festival since 2015.

=== Notable performances and collaborations ===
Yang has appeared multiple times at the BBC Proms, including performing 'Cavatina' with the Ulster Orchestra conducted by David Brophy at BBC Proms in the Park, Belfast in 2018. On July 14, 2019, she performed at the Bastille Day concert at the foot of the Eiffel Tower in Paris, appearing as soloist in the second movement of Rodrigo's Concierto de Aranjuez with the Orchestre National de France, conducted by Jaap van Zweden, before a live audience of 500,000 people.

Her orchestral collaborations have expanded significantly, with performances alongside major ensembles including the Barcelona Symphony Orchestra, Royal Liverpool Philharmonic, Beijing Symphony Orchestra, Melbourne Symphony Orchestra, and Hong Kong Philharmonic Orchestra.

== Performances ==
Xuefei Yang has performed extensively across the globe, captivating audiences in more than 50 countries. Her international success has led her to prestigious venues such as Carnegie Hall and Lincoln Center in New York, Wigmore Hall, Royal Albert Hall, and all Southbank Centre venues in London, as well as the Philharmonie Berlin, Concertgebouw Amsterdam, Konzerthaus Vienna, Auditorio Nacional de España, and Barcelona Auditorium.

Among her most notable performances was her appearance at the 2019 Bastille Day concert at the foot of the Eiffel Tower in Paris, where she performed as soloist in the second movement of Rodrigo's Concierto de Aranjuez with the Orchestre National de France, conducted by Jaap van Zweden, before a live audience of 500,000 people. The concert concluded with spectacular fireworks and was broadcast live on television across France.

Yang has made multiple appearances at the BBC Proms, including performing "Cavatina" with the Ulster Orchestra conducted by David Brophy at BBC Proms in the Park, Belfast in 2018. She performed at 54 concerts for the "Night of the Proms Tour" in 2003/2004, appearing in Belgium, The Netherlands and Germany, to a total audience of over 800,000 people.

Yang is frequently invited to perform with the world's leading orchestras including the Royal Philharmonic Orchestra, London Philharmonic Orchestra, BBC Concert Orchestra, Royal Scottish National Orchestra, Royal Liverpool Philharmonic, Hamburg Symphony Orchestra, Rotterdam Symphony Orchestra, Hong Kong Philharmonic Orchestra, New Zealand Symphony Orchestra, Detroit Symphony Orchestra, Seoul Philharmonic, China Philharmonic Orchestra, Barcelona Symphony Orchestra, Beijing Symphony Orchestra, Melbourne Symphony Orchestra, and China National Orchestra.

== Recordings ==
Xuefei Yang's extensive discography showcases her pioneering role in expanding the classical guitar repertoire through three distinct but interconnected approaches: exploring an exceptionally wide range of musical styles and traditions, premiering contemporary works written specifically for her by leading composers, and creating groundbreaking transcriptions of traditional Chinese music that had never been adapted for guitar before. Gramophone magazine praised her as one of the leading innovators of her generation for continuing to build the guitar repertoire, and her recordings have received critical acclaim, with her first receiving a gold disc and her second selected as Editor's Choice in Gramophone magazine.

=== Wide range of repertoire ===
Yang's recordings demonstrate remarkable stylistic diversity, spanning centuries and continents. Her debut album Classical Guitar by Xuefei Yang (1999, Xianheng Nanjing) showcased her early talent across traditional repertoire. Romance de Amor (2006, EMI) explores Spanish repertoire by Isaac Albéniz and Joaquín Rodrigo, while 40 Degrees North (2008, EMI) features Yang's transcription of Mallorca alongside works from multiple traditions.

Her album Heartstrings (2015, Decca) exemplifies this diversity, featuring "many of the big names associated with the traditional and modern guitar repertoire (Falla, Barrios, Albéniz, Pujol, Llobet, Brouwer, Dyens, York), and a wide range of other classical composers (Debussy, Elgar, Schubert, Paganini, Mussorgsky)" with an emphasis on more melodic, accessible pieces. Yang produced the album herself, explaining: "I wanted to do an album that might get to a wider audience, with lighter and shorter pieces." The album reached #1 in Hong Kong classical charts for 3 weeks.

J.S. Bach: Concertos & Transcriptions (2012, EMI) with the Elias String Quartet showcases Yang's innovative Bach arrangements, including violin and harpsichord concertos arranged for guitar and string quartet. Her collaborations extend to vocal music, including Britten Songs (2013, EMI) and Songs from Our Ancestors (2016, Globe Music) with Ian Bostridge, and chamber music such as Milonga Del Angel (2018, Deutsche Grammophon) with violinist Mengla Huang, demonstrating her versatility across genres.

=== Premiering contemporary works ===
Yang has been instrumental in commissioning and premiering new works for guitar, working closely with composers to expand the instrument's contemporary repertoire. She has received new works from composers such as Chen Yi, Stephen Goss, Timothy Salter, and Carlo Domeniconi. Stephen Goss wrote the Albéniz Concerto specifically for Yang, "commissioned by EMI Classics for Xuefei Yang, the Orquestra Simfònica de Barcelona i Nacional de Catalunya and conductor Eiji Oue", which appears on her Concierto de Aranjuez (2010, EMI) album. Yang gave the Asian premiere of this concerto with the China National Orchestra. Goss also composed Chinese Garden for her, a set of four pieces based on Chinese folksongs, first performed at Wigmore Hall, London, on 16 April 2008 and featured on 40 Degrees North.

Yang has also performed the Australian premiere of Tan Dun's guitar concerto, and has received works from Mark Houghton, Leo Brouwer (who dedicated a piece to Yang for the Changsha International Guitar Festival), and John Brunning, whose complete guitar works with orchestra are featured on Magna Carta (2022, Prima Facie) with the Royal Liverpool Philharmonic.

=== Traditional Chinese music transcriptions ===
Perhaps Yang's most significant contribution to guitar repertoire has been her pioneering transcriptions of traditional Chinese music, bringing centuries-old melodies to the guitar for the first time. "Many of our traditional instruments are plucked so the guitar is a very natural fit", Yang explains.

Her album Si Ji (Four Seasons) (2005, GSP) was groundbreaking in this regard, featuring Chinese pieces like Wang Huiran's Yi Dance and Yang's transcription of Three Ancient Melodies. The album includes works by contemporary Chinese composers alongside Yang's arrangements of traditional pieces, creating a bridge between ancient and modern Chinese musical traditions. Her album Heartstrings (2015, Decca) also features significant Chinese transcriptions, including The Fisherman's Song at Eventide, which Yang describes as particularly meaningful and which she often uses as an encore piece that "seemed to resonate most strongly" with audiences.

Sketches of China (2020, Decca) represents the culmination of this work, featuring "traditional music, which is a big part of Chinese culture, arranged for guitar, and the more modern pieces written specially for the instrument, as well as pieces for guitar and orchestra". The album includes collaborations with traditional Chinese instrumentalists Weiliang Zhang (xiao) and Yuan Sha (guzheng). ArtMuseLondon described it as "a release as important as it is appealing, this masterpiece is perhaps Yang's greatest labour of love, not to mention a colossal achievement."

Yang's latest releases continue this multifaceted approach: X Culture (2023, Apple Music) features "composers exploring musical inspirations from other cultures", while Songs of Joy and Sorrow (2024, Apple Music) with cellist Johannes Moser demonstrates ongoing collaboration across musical traditions.

Her album Chapeau Satie (2025, Platoon Ltd) shows her continued exploration of diverse repertoire, this time focusing on the French composer Erik Satie.

== Reception ==
Yang has received widespread critical acclaim throughout her career. Early in her career, German newspaper Badische Zeitung declared: "The enthusiastic reviews that have appeared in the press about this far-eastern prodigy do not seem in the slightest exaggerated after hearing this concert. Xuefei Yang is already among the best guitarists in the world." (9 July 2002)

"But the star of the evening was the Chinese guitarist Xuefei Yang. In Xiaoyong Chen's Static and Rotation she turned sweet, chiming overtones into a wild sound like a hailstorm on a window. And, playing with similar brilliance in Robert Saxton's Night Dance, Timothy Salter's Equipoise premiere, and Britten's Nocturnal after John Dowland, Yang's easeful virtuosity won the day." (Matthew Connolly, The Times, 14 January 2003)

The New York Sun described her as "one of the most extraordinary instrumentalists in the world," while Northwestern University noted her performances display "sparkle, clarity, and flair."

"Feisty virtuosity, impeccable technique and sensitive musicianship… her lyrical playing, warm sound and charismatic artistry connect with audiences far beyond the guitar fraternity." (New York Times, cited in Classic FM Magazine, 2012)

Reviewing her performance with the Hallé Orchestra in 2012, the Oldham Chronicle wrote: "The Hallé played host to one of the world's finest classical guitarists as Beijing-born Xuefei Yang took centre stage for a performance of Rodrigo's Concierto de Aranjuez. The UK-based musician wowed the audience with her precision and feeling."

BBC Music Magazine reviewer Freya Parr praised Yang's technical prowess, noting: "You can't fault Yang for her control, accuracy and technical prowess. Her articulation is varied, her intentions never in doubt."

In 2020, Gramophone featured Yang in a podcast about her album Sketches of China, describing it as "a beautiful celebration of music from her homeland."

Her album X Culture was named as a top 25 recording of 2023 by ArtMuseLondon.

"The innovative and indefatigable guitarist delighted an appreciative audience at the Boston Classical Guitar Society's concert… Yang's ability to combine multiple genres, perform with an improvisatory spirit, and engage with generosity [made] this charismatic musician a standout." (The Boston Musical Intelligencer, 15 March 2023)

== Discography ==
- Classical Guitar by Xuefei Yang, 1999 (先恒, Xianheng Nanjing)
- Si Ji (Four Seasons), 2005 (GSP)
- Romance de Amor, 2006 (EMI)
- 40 Degrees North, 2008 (EMI)
- Concierto de Aranjuez, 2010 (EMI), with Barcelona Symphony Orchestra and National Orchestra of Catalonia
- J.S.Bach: Concertos & Transcriptions, 2012 (EMI), with Elias String Quartet
- Britten Songs, 2013 (EMI), with Ian Bostridge
- Sojourn - The Very Best of Xuefei Yang, 2013 (Warner), with Elias String Quartet
- Heartstrings, 2015 (Decca/Universal)
- Colours of Brazil, 2016 (Decca/Universal)
- Songs from Our Ancestors, 2016 (Globe Music), with Ian Bostridge
- Milonga Del Angel, 2018 (Deutsche Grammophon), with Mengla Huang
- One Day in November (EP), 2019 (Apple Music)
- Sketches of China, 2020 (Decca/Universal), with Xiamen Philharmonic Orchestra, Weiliang Zhang, Sha Yuan
- Summertime (EP), 2021 (Apple Music)
- Winter Songs (EP), 2021 (Apple Music)
- Magna Carta: The Complete Works for Guitar and Orchestra of John Brunning, 2022 (Prima Facie), with Royal Liverpool Philharmonic
- Guitar Favourites, 2022 (Decca/Universal)
- Striking a Chord, 2022 (Warner)
- X Culture, 2023 (Apple Music)
- Songs of Joy and Sorrow, 2024 (Apple Music), with Johannes Moser
- Chapeau Satie, 2025 (Platoon Ltd)
