= List of compositions by Mario Castelnuovo-Tedesco =

This is a list of compositions by Mario Castelnuovo-Tedesco.

== Piano ==
- Cielo di Settembre, Op. 1 (1910)
- Questo fu il carro della morte, Op. 2 (1913)
- Il raggio verde, Op. 9 (1916)
- Alghe, Op. 12 (1919)
- I Naveganti, Op. 13 (1919)
- Cipressi, Op. 17 (1920)
- La sirenetta e il pesce turchino. Fiaba marina, Op. 18 (1920), also for two pianos (1935)
- Cantico (per una statuetta di San Bernardino di Niccolò dell'Arca), Op. 19 (1920)
- Vitalba e Biancospino, Fiaba Silvana, Op. 21 (1921)
- Epigrafe (per la tomba di Madonna Ilaria del Carretto, scolpita da Jacopo della Quercia, che è in Lucca), Op. 25 (1922)
- Alt Wien. Rapsodia Viennese, Op. 30 (1923), also for two pianos (1923)
- Piedigrotta 1924: Rapsodia napoletana, Op. 32 (1924), also for two pianos (1940)
- Le Stagioni, Op. 33 (1924)
- Le danze del Re David: Rapsodia ebraica su temi tradizionali, Op. 37 (1925)
- Tre Corali su melodie ebraiche, Op. 43 (1926)
- Tre poemi campestri, Op. 44 (1926)
- Piano Sonata, Op. 51 (1928)
- Passatempi, Op. 54 (1928)
- B-A-BA: Variazioni sopra un tema infantile, Op. 57 (1929)
- Crinoline, Op. 59 (1929)
- Fantasia e Fuga sul nome di Ildebrando Pizzetti, Op. 63 (1930)
- Media difficoltà: Quattro pezzi, Op. 65 (1931)
- 2 Film Studies, Op. 67 (1931)
- Tre preludi alpestri, Op.. 84 (1935)
- Onde: 2 studi, Op. 86 (1935)
- Stars, 4 sketches, Op. 104 (1940)
- Candide: Six Illustrations from the Novel by Voltaire, Op. 123 (1944)
- Suite nello stile italiano, Op. 138 (1947)
- Evangèlion: The story of Jesus, narrated to the children in 28 little piano pieces, Op. 141 (1949)
- Six Canons, Op. 142 (1950)
- Six Pieces in Form of Canons, Op. 156 (1952)
- El encanto. Three California Sketches, Op. 165 (1953)
- From the set of Greeting Cards, Op. 170
  - Tango for Piano on the Name of André Previn, Op. 170/1 (1953)
  - Mirages for Piano on the Name of Gieseking, Op. 170/4
  - Fandango for Piano on the Name of Amparo Iturbi, Op. 170/9 (1954)
  - Lullaby on the name of Claudia, Op. 170/9a (1954)
  - Etude on the name of Jacob Gimpel, Op. 170/11 (1955)
  - "Für Erna" (instead of "für Elise") Albumblatt für Klavier von Mario (instead of "Ludwig van ..."), Op. 170/12 (1956)
  - A Canon for Robin, Op. 170/13 (1956)
  - A Fandango for Escovado, Op. 170/16 (1958)
  - Ricercare sul nome di Luigi Dallapiccola, Op. 170/17 (1958)
  - Little March on the name of Scott Harrison, Op. 170/20 (1960)
  - Slow, with variations on the name of Nicolas Slonimsky, Op. 170/22 (1960)
  - Leggenda per pianoforte sul nome di Gisella Selden-Goth, Op. 170/26 (1960)
  - Angelus sul nome di Nino Rota-Rinaldi, Op. 170/27 (1960)
  - Melodia sul nome di Claudio Sartori, Op. 170/30 (1961)
  - Prelude and Fugue on the name of Gerhard Albersheim, Op. 170/31 (1962)
  - Prelude, Aria and Fugue on the name of Hugh Mullins, Op. 170/32 (1962)
  - Canzonetta on the name of Nick Rossi, Op. 170/35 (1964)
- The Stories of Joseph, Op. 178 (1955)
- Sonata zoologica, Op. 187 (1960)
- Works for piano without Opus
  - Arie Antiche (1905)
  - Notturno (1905)
  - Ninna Nanna (Bérceuse) [aka "Piccola bérceuse"] (1905)
  - English Suite for harpsichord or piano. Homage to Dr. Thomas Augustine Arne (1710-1778) (1909)
  - Calma (a Giramonte) (1910)
  - Primavera fiorentina: Le nozze di Lisa Ricasoli e di Bocaccio Adimari (da un cassone muriale custodito nel Museo dell'Accademia); Scene musicali (1911)
  - 6 Novellette (1913)
  - Lucertolina (1916) – became third movement of Sonatina zoologica (Op. 187)
  - Mi-La (1931)
  - Preludio su L'Annunciazione di Andrea della Robbia, che è alla Verna (1934)
  - Terrazze (1936)
  - Nocturne in Hollywood (1941)
  - Homage to Paderewski (1941)
  - Toccata (based on a theme by Harold Gelman) (1941)
  - Prelude (1948) (also as "Preludio e Fanfara: 2 études in 12-tone")
  - Ninna-Nanna del dopoguerra, sul nome di Guglielmo Sangiorgi (1952)
- Transcriptions for piano
  - "La Pisanella" di Ildebrando Pizzetti: 4 trascrizioni da concerto (1916–17) for piano
  - Valse, from "Serenade for Strings, Op. 48", by Tchaikovsky (1943) for one piano, four hands

== Two pianos ==
- La sirenetta e il pesce turchino. Fiaba marina Op. 18 (1920), arranged for two pianos(1935)
- Alt Wien. Rapsodia viennese, Op. 30 (1923) for two pianos
- Notturno e tarantella da Piedigrotta 1924: Rapsodia napoletana, Op. 32a (1940) for two pianos
- From the set of Greeting Cards, Op. 170
  - Duo-Pianism:impromptu for two pianos on the names of Hans and Rosaleen Moldenhauer, Op170/19 (1959)
- 2 Balladen von Schiller. Melodrama für einen Sprecher, zwei Klaviere und Schlagzeug, Op. 193 (1961)
- The Importance of Being Earnest. Three Acts after the comedy of Oscar Wilde, Op. 198 (1962), Chamber opera for 8 soloists: 2 soprano, mezzo, contralto, 2 tenor, baritone, bass, two pianos, percussion
- Works for two pianos without Opus
  - Napolitana on the theme of the song "Funiculi, Funicula" (1945) for two pianos
- Transcriptions
  - Valse, from "Serenade for Strings, Op. 48", by Tchaikovsky (1943) for two pianos
  - "Pavane pour une Infanta défunte" by Ravel (1944) for two pianos
  - "Minuet", from L'Arlesienne Suite by Bizet (1944) for two pianos
  - "Waltz", from Masquerade Suite by Khachaturian (1950) for two pianos
  - "Cinderella's Waltz", from "Cinderella" (Op. 87) by Prokofiev for two pianos

== Voice ==
- Le Roi Loys. Ballata cavalleresca. Poesia medioevale francese, Op. 3 (1914), arranged for voice and orchestra (1930)
- Ninna Nanna per l'album di una bimba, Op. 4 (1914), arranged for voice and orchestra (1927)
- Fuori i Barbari! Canto patriottico, Op. 5 (1915), arranged for voice and orchestra (1915), arranged for band (1915)
- Stelle cadenti. 12 liriche brevi su poesie popolari toscane, Op. 6 (1915-1918)
- Coplas. 11 liriche brevi su poesie popolari spagnole, Op. 7 (1915), arranged for voice and orchestra (1967)
- Briciole. Tre liriche brevi di Aldo Palazzeschi, Op. 8 (1916)
- Tre fioretti di San Francesco, Op. 11 (1920), arranged for voice and orchestra (1919-1920)
- Girotondo dei golosi, Op. 14 (1920)
- L'Infinito. Poesia di Giacomo Leopardi, Op. 22 (1921)
- Sera. Dante, Purgatorio Canto VIII, Op. 23 (1921)
- The Passionate Pilgrim (songs from Shakespeare's Tradegies and Comedies). 33 Shakespeare Songs, Op. 24 (1921–25)
- Piccino picciò (Ninna-Nanna). Versi di Corrado Pavolini, Op 26 (1922)
- Ballata (Messer Angelo Ambrozini, detto in Poliziano), Op. 27 (1923)
- La Barba bianca. Un dialogo di Vamba (Luigi Bertelli), Op. 28 (1923)
- 2 Preghiere per i bimbi d'Italia. Poesie di Vamba (Luigi Bertelli), Op. 29 (1923)
- 4 Scherzi per musica di Messer Francesco Redi, Op. 35/1 (1924)
- 4 Scherzi per musica di Messer Francesco Redi. 2nd Series, Op. 35/2 (1925)
- 1830: 3 Chansons par Alfred De Musset, mises en musique sur des fragments de Bach, Op. 36 (1925)
- Indian Serenade. Poem by Percy Bysshe Shelley, Op. 38 (1925)
- Drei Heine-Lieder/Tre poesie di Heinrich Heine; Op. 40 (1926)
- Quattro Sonetti da "La vita nova", Op. 41 (1926)
- 3 Sonnets from the Portuguese. Elizabeth Barrett Browning, Op. 42 (1926)
- Cadix. Chanson par Alfred de Musset (1844), Op. 45 (1926)
- Ore Sole. Text by Aldo Palazzeschi, Op. 52 (1928)
- Chant Hébraique: Vocalise, Op. 53 (1928)
- 3 Vocalizzi, nello stile moderno, Op. 55 (1928)
- Drei Heine Lieder. IItes Heft, Op. 60/1 (1929)
- Drei Heine Lieder (Sternen Lieder). III Heft, Op. 60/2 (1929)
- Sei Odi di Orazio, Op. 62 (1930)
- Ballade des biens immeubles (extrait des "Nourritures terrestres" ). André Gide, Op. 68 (1931)
- 2 Sonetti del Petrarca, Op.74/1 (1933)
- Petrarcha-Chopin: 3 Madrigali (versi di Francesco Petrarca), Op. 74/2 (1933)
- 2 Romances Viejos. Poesie medioevali spagnole, Op. 75/1 (1933)
- La Ermita di San Simon, Op. 75/2 (1934)
- Romances Viejos, II series, Op. 75/3 (1935)
- Trois poèmes de la Pléïade, Op. 79 (1934)
- Trois Fragments de Marcel Proust (extraits de "Les plaisirs et les jours"), Op. 88 (1936)
- I saw in Louisiana. Poem by Walt Whitman, Op. 89/1 (1936)
- Leaves of Grass. A Song Cycle for Voice and Piano. Poems by Walt Whitman, Op. 89/2 (1936)
- Ocean. Poem by Walt Whitman, Op. 89/3 (1936)
- Féeries: 3 poèmes de Paul Valéry, Op. 91a (1936)
- Charmes: 3 poèmes de Paul Valéry, Op. 91b (1936)
- A Dante Sonnet/Un Sonetto di Dante. Dante Gabriel Rossetti, Op. 101 (1939)
- Pansies, 2 poems by D. H. Lawrence, Op. 103 (1939)
- Recuerdo. Poem by Edna St. Vincent Millay, Op. 105 (1940)
- The Legend of Jonas Bronck. Lyrics by Arthur Guiterman, Op. 106/1 (1940)
- New York. Poem by Arthur Guiterman, Op.106/2 (1940)
- Upon His Blindness [published as "When I Consider How My Life is Spent"]. Words by Milton, Op. 109 (1940)
- Le Rossignol. Words by Frère Joseph, François Leclerc du Tremblay. English version by R.B. Falk, Op. 117 (1942)
- Ozymandias for voice and piano. Words by P. B. Shelley, Op. 124/1 (1944)
- The Daffodils. Words by William Wordsworth, Op. 124/2 (1944)
- The Shadow. Poem by Ben Jonson, Op. 124/3 (1944)
- Shakespeare Sonnets, Op. 125/1 (1944–45)
- Shakespeare Sonnets, Op. 125/4 (1963)
- Cinque Poesie Romanesche. Words by Mario dall'Arco, Op. 131 (1946)
- Vogelweide: ein Lieder-Cyklus für Bariton und Gitarre (oder Klavier), Op. 186 (1959)
- Il Bestiario. Dodici poesie di Arturo Loria, Op. 188 (1960)
- Poesia Svedese, Op. 189/1 (1960)
- The Divan of Moses Ibn Ezra, Op. 207 (1966)
- Works without Opus
  - 3 Chansons Grises: parole di Paul Verlaine (1910) for voice and piano
  - Cera vergine (1916) for voice and piano
  - La Battaglia è finita (1916) for voice and piano
  - Due Liriche dal "Giardiniere" di Tagore (1916) for voice and piano, arranged for voice and orchestra (1917)
  - Il Libro di Dolcina. Versi di Laura Milani Comparetti (1917) for voice and piano
  - La Canzone della Tombola. Versi di Ugo Castelnuovo-Tedesco (1920) for voice and piano
  - Étoile filante. Poème de G. Jean Aubry (1921) for voice and piano
  - La sera fiesolana; laude per canto e pianoforte. Versi di Gabriele D'Annunzio (1923) for voice and piano
  - La canzone di Usigliano. Parole di Fernando Liuzzi (1923) for voice and piano
  - Villa Sola. Versi di Alberto Carocci (1927) for voice and piano
  - Ballade des amantes célèbres; pour chant et piano. Poème de André Gide (1934) for voice and piano
  - Chanson à boire (Rabelais) (1936) for voice and piano
  - Tavern. Words by Edna St. Vincent Millay (1940) for voice and piano
  - [Sweet] Spring. Words by Thomas Nash (1567-1601) (1941) for voice and piano
  - Two Byron Songs (1941) for voice and piano
  - My Love's Like a Red Rose for voice and piano. Words by Robert Burns (1941) for voice and piano
  - Two Stevenson Songs (1941) for voice and piano
  - Two Kipling Songs (from "The Jungle Book") (1942) for voice and piano
  - Le Colombe. Words by Arturo Loria (1946) for voice and piano (later became part of Il Bestiario, Op. 188)
  - De Amico ad Amicam. (Lines from a love letter, c. 1300) (1947) for voice and piano
  - Ballata dall'Esilio. Text by Guido Cavalcanti (1300) (1956) for voice and guitar
  - Three Little Songs. Text by Ulric Devaré (1958) for voice and piano
  - Le Voyage. Text by Joachim du Bellay (1525-1561) (1959) for voice and piano
- Transcriptions for voice
  - "La Pisanella" di Ildebrando Pizzetti: Spartito completo (1916–17) for voice and piano
  - Three Sephardic Songs (1949) transcribed and harmonized by Mario Castelnuovo-Tedesco. English and French translations by MCT, for voice and piano (or harp), arranged for voice and orchestra (1960)
  - Vos Toig Mir (A Yiddish Melody) (1963) harmonized by Mario Castelnuovo-Tedesco, for voice and piano

== Violin ==
- Signorine. 2 profili for violin and piano, Op. 10 (1918)
- Alghe, Op. 12 (1919), transcribed for violin and piano by G. Maglioni (1930)
- Ritmi, Op. 15 (1920)
- Capitan Fracassa, Op. 16 (1920), orchestrated by Manoah Leide
- Sea-Murmurs. An adaption of "Arise" from Shakespeare's "Cymbeline", Shakespeare Songs Book VI, No. 2, Op. 24a (1932), arranged for violin and piano by Jascha Heifetz.
- Tango. An adaption of "Two Maids Wooing" from Shakespeare's "The Winter's Tale", Shakespeare Songs, Book VIII, No. 3, Op. 24b (1932) arranged for piano and violin by Jascha Heifetz
- Due Danze della rapsodia "Alt Wien", from Alt Wien. Rapsodia viennese, Op, 30 (1923), no 1 and 2 transcribed for violin and piano by Mario Corti (1930)
- Notturno e tarantella della Rapsodia napoletana, from Piedigrotta 1924, Op. 32 (1924) transcribed for violin and piano by Mario Corti(1929)
- Notturno Adriatico, Op. 34 (1924)
- Chant Hébraique: Vocalise., Op. 53 (1928) transcribed for violin and piano by G. Maglioni (1930)
- 3 Vocalizzi nello stile moderno, Op. 55 (1928) transcribed for violin and piano by Mario Corti (1930)
- Sonata quasi una fantasia, Op. 56 (1929)
- The Lark: Poem in the form of a Rondò, Op. 64 (1931)
- Ritmo di Tango, Op. 65a (1949), transcription of "Tango" by Jascha Heifetz, from Media Difficoltà
- Concerto No. 3 per violino e pianoforte, Op. 102 (1939)
- Ballade, Op. 107 (1940)
- La Figlia del Reggimento ("The Daughter of the Regiment"). A Fantasy for Violin and Piano on themes by Donizetti, Op. 110 (1941)
- Sonata for violin and violoncello, Op. 148 (1950)
- From the set of Greeting Cards, Op. 170
  - Serenatella on the Name of Jascha Heifetz, Op. 170, No. 2 (1954) for violin and piano
  - Humoresque on the name of Tossy Spivakovsky, Op. 170, No. 8 (1954) for violin and piano
  - Intermezzo on the Name of Harvey Siegal, Op. 170, No. 23
  - Valse bluette on the Name of Erick Friedman, Op. 170, No. 24
  - Hungarian serenade on the Name of Miklós Rózsa, Op. 170, No. 25
- Works without Opus
  - 3 Canti all'aria aperta (1919) for violin and piano
  - Exotica: A Rhapsody of the South Seas (1934) for violin and piano
- Transcriptions
  - "Figaro" from The Barber of Seville by Rossini (1943) for violin and piano
  - "Don Giovanni" (Serenade) from Don Giovanni by Mozart (1943) for violin and piano
  - "Cherubino", two arias from The Marriage of Figaro by Mozart, freely transcribed for violin and piano (1944)
  - "Susanna" from The Marriage of Figaro by Mozart (1944) for violin and piano
  - "Rosina" from The Barber of Seville by Rossini (1944) for violin and piano
  - "Violetta" from La traviata by Verdi, a concert transcription for violin and piano (1944)
  - "Jeux d'eau" by Ravel, a concert transcription for violin and piano (1945)
  - "12 Preludes" by Chopin (1946) for violin and piano
  - "Fantasie Impromptu" by Chopin (1947) for violin and piano
  - "Intermezzo", Op. 117/1–3 by Johannes Brahms (No. 1: 1947, Nos. 2, 3: 1951) for violin and piano

== Viola ==
- Sonata for viola and violoncello, Op. 144 (1950)
- From the set of Greeting Cards, Op. 170
  - Suite 508, Op. 170/21 (1960) for viola and piano.
  - The Persian Prince on the name of David Blumberg, Op. 170/51 (1967) for viola and harp.

== Cello ==
- Cello Concerto in G minor, Op.72 (1935)
- I Nottambuli. Variazioni Fantastiche for cello and piano, Op. 47 (1927), arranged for cello and orchestra (1960)
- Sonata per violoncello e pianoforte, Op. 50 (1928)
- Chant Hébraique: Vocalise, Op. 53 (1928), arranged for cello and piano (1930)
- Notturno sull'acqua (in riva all'Arno, alla Gonfolina, in una sera di Giugno), Op. 82/1 (1935)
- Scherzino, Op. 82/2 (1935)
- Toccata, Op. 83 (1935)
- Sonatina, Op. 130 (1946) for bassoon (or cello) and piano
- Sonata for viola and violoncello, Op. 144 (1950)
- Sonata for violin and violoncello, Op. 148 (1950)
- Sonata for violoncello and harp, Op. 208 (1967)
- From the set of Greeting Cards, Op. 170
  - Valse on the Name of Gregor Piatigorsky, Op. 170/3
- Works without Opus
  - Meditation 'Kol Nidre' for cello and piano (1941)
- Transcriptions for cello
  - "Figaro" from The Barber of Seville by Rossini (1943) for violoncello and piano
  - "Don Giovanni" (Serenade) from Don Giovanni by Mozart (1943) for violoncello and piano
  - "La Vallée des Cloches" from "Miroirs" by Ravel, a concert transcription for cello and piano (1944)
  - "Alborada del Gracioso" from "Miroirs" by Ravel, a concert transcription for cello and piano (1944)

== Organ ==
- Five Organ Preludes from the "Sacred Service for the Sabbath Eve", Op. 122/1a (1943)
- Introduction, Aria and Fugue (Toccata for organ on the name of Edward George Power Biggs, Op. 159) (1953)
- From the set of Greeting Cards, Op. 170
  - Chorale-prelude on the name of Albert Schweitzer, Op. 170/18a (1959)
  - Fugue on the name of Albert Schweitzer, Op. 170/18b (1959)
  - Prelude on the Name of Frederick Tulan, Op. 170/49 (1967)
- Works for organ without Opus
  - Fanfare for organ on the twelve-tone row. Published as "Due Preludi per Organo" (1949).
  - Prelude on the twelve-tone row. Published as "Due Preludi per Organo" (1949).
  - Prayers my Grandfather Wrote. Sei preludi per organo sopra un tema di Bruno Senigaglia (1962)

== Guitar ==
- "Arise" from Shakespeare Songs, Book VI, No. 2, Op. 24/5 (1965), arranged for voice and guitar
- "Seals of Love" from Shakespeare Songs, Second Series, Book I, No. 2, Op. 24/6 (1965), arranged for voice and guitar
- Variazioni attraverso i secoli (Variations à travers les siècles), Op. 71 (1932)
- La Ermita di San Simon, Op. 75/2 (1934), arranged for voice and guitar (1962)
- Romances Viejos, II series, No. 2", Op. 75/3 (1935), arranged for voice and guitar (1962)
- Sonata (Omaggio a Boccherini), Op. 77 (1934)
- Capriccio diabolico (Homage to Paganini), Op. 85 (1935)
- Tarantella, Op. 87a (1936)
- Aranci in fiore, Op. 87b (1936)
- Variations plaisantes sur un petit air populaire (J'ai du bon tabac, Op. 95 (1937)
- Rondò pour guitare seule, Op. 129 (1946)
- Suite pour guitare seule, Op. 133 (1947)
- Fantasia pour guitare et piano, Op. 145 (1950)
- Romancero gitano. Poetry by Federico García Lorca, Op. 152 (1951)
- From the set of Greeting Cards, Op. 170
  - Tonadilla sur le nom de Andrès Segovia, Op. 170/5 (1954)
  - Rondel über den Namen Siegfried Behrend, Op. 170/6 (1954)
  - Preludio in forma di habanera sul nome di Bruno Tonazzi, Op. 170/7 (1954)
  - Tanka (Japanese Song) on the name of Isao Takahashi, Op. 170/10 (1955)
  - Ninna Nanna, a Lullaby for Eugene, Op. 170/14 (1957)
  - Canto delle Azzorre sul nome di Enos, Op. 170/15 (1958)
  - Canzone Siciliana sul nome di Mario Gangi, Op. 170/33 (1962)
  - Ballatella on the name of Christopher Parkening, Op. 170/34 (1963)
  - Sarabande on the name of Rey de la Torre, Op. 170/36 (1964)
  - Romanza sul nome di Oscar Ghiglia, Op. 170/37 (1964)
  - Fantasia sul nome di Ronald e Henry Purcell, Op. 170/38 (1966)
  - Canción Cubana on the name of Hector Garcia, Op. 170/39 (1965)
  - Canción Venezuelana sul nome di Alirio Díaz, Op. 170/40 (1966)
  - Canción Argentina sul nome di Ernesto Bitetti, Op. 170/41 (1966)
  - Estudio sul nome di Manuel López Ramos, Op. 170/42 (1966)
  - Aria da chiesa sul nome di Ruggero Chiesa, Op. 170/43 (1967)
  - Brasileria sul nome di Laurindo Almeida, Op. 170/44 (1967)
  - Japanese Print on the Name Jiro Matsuda, Op. 170/46 (1967)
  - Volo d'Angeli sul nome di Angelo Gilardino, Op. 170/47 (1967)
  - Canzone Calabrese sul nome di Ernest Calabria, Op. 170/48 (1967)
  - Tarantella campana sul nome di Eugene di Novi, Op. 170/50 (1967)
- Tre Preludi mediterranei, Op. 176 (1955)
- Escarraman: A Suite of Spanish Dances from the XVI Century (after Cervantes), Op. 177 (1955)
- Passacaglia (Omaggio a Roncalli), Op. 180 (1956)
- Vogelweide: ein Lieder-Cyklus für Bariton und Gitarre (oder Klavier), Op. 186 (1959)
- Platero y yo para narrador y guitarra, Op. 190 (1960), text by Juan Ramón Jiménez)
- Tre preludi al Circeo, Op. 194 (1961)
- 24 caprichos de Goya, Op. 195 (1961)
- Sonatina, pour flute et guitare, Op. 205 (1965)
- Eclogues, for flute, English horn and guitar, Op. 206 (1965)
- The Divan of Moses-Ibn-Ezra (1055-1135): a cycle of songs for voice and guitar, Op. 207 (1966)
- Appunti, Preludi e studi per chitarra, Op. 210 (1967-1968) [incomplete]
- Transcriptions
  - "Minstrels" da Preludes, Libro I by Claude Debussy (1951)
  - "Pavane (pour un Infante défunte)" by Maurice Ravel (1953)
  - Sonata I for Guitar and Harpsichord. Realization of the figured bass of a work by Rudolph Strauber (c1725-1780) (1958) for guitar and harpsichord

== Two guitars ==
- Sonata canonica, Op. 196 (1961)
- Les Guitares bien tempérées. 24 preludes et fugues pour 2 guitares, Op. 199 (1962)
- Concerto in G for two Guitars and Orchestra, Op. 201 (1962)
- Works without Opus
  - Fuga elegiaca, to the memory of Ida Presti (1967) for two guitars

== Harp ==
- Three Songs from As You Like It, Shakespeare Songs, Book II, Op. 24/4 (1941) arranged for voice, harp (or piano) and strings
- Concertino per arpa, quartetto d'archi e 3 clarinetti, Op. 93 (1936–37) for harp, string quartet, 3 clarinets
- 6 Scottish Songs (Poems by Sir Walter Scott), Op. 100 (1939) for soprano, tenor, harp and strings
- Songs of the Shulamite (from "The Song of Songs"), Op. 163 (1953) for voice, flute, harp and string quartet
- From the set of Greeting Cards, Op. 170
  - Arabesque on the name of Roger, Op. 170/29 (1961) for harp
  - Second arabesque for harp on the name of Pearl Chertok, Op. 170/45 (1967)
  - The Persian Prince on the name of David Blumberg, Op.170/51 (1967) for viola and harp
- Sonata for Violoncello and Harp, Op. 208 (1967)
- The Harp of King David. Rhapsody for harp, Op. 209 (1967)
- Transcriptions
  - Three Sephardic Songs (1949) transcribed and harmonized by MCT. English and French translations by MCT, for voice and harp (or piano), arranged for voice and orchestra (1960)

== Double bass ==
- Chant Hébraique: Vocalise, Op. 53 (1928) transcribed for double bass and piano (1964)

== Clarinet ==
- Sonata per clarinetto e pianoforte, Op. 128 (1945)
- Pastorale and Rondo, Op. 185 (1958) for clarinet, violin, violoncello and piano

== Bassoon ==
- Sonatina, Op. 130 (1946) for bassoon (cello) and piano

== Oboe ==
- Concerto da camera, Op. 146 (1950) for oboe and strings (three horns and timpani, optional), arranged for oboe and piano as "Sonata for Oboe and Piano" by the composer
- "Aria" from the Concerto da camera, Op. 146a (1964) for oboe, cello and piano, also arranged for oboe, cello and guitar

== Flute ==
- Divertimento for 2 Flutes, Op. 119 (1943)
- Sonatina, pour flute et guitare, Op. 205 (1965)
- Eclogues, for flute, English horn and guitar, Op. 206 (1965)

== Trumpet ==
- Sonata Pomposa, Op. 179/1 (1955) for trumpet and piano (for open trumpet)
- Sonata Leggera, Op. 179/2 (1955) for trumpet and piano (for muted trumpet)

== Chamber ==
- 1° Trio in G Major for violin, cello and piano, Op. 49 (1928)
- String Quartet No.1 in G Major, Op. 58 (1929)
- Piano Quintet No. 1in F Major for two violins, viola, cello and piano, Op. 69 (1931-2)
- 2° Trio in G Major for violin, cello and piano Op 70 (1932)
- Concertino per arpa, quartetto d'archi e 3 clarinetti, Op. 93 (1936–37)
- Silent Devotion from the "Sacred Service", Op. 122/1b (1943) for two violins, viola, cello and bass
- String Quartet No. 2 in F Minor, Op. 139 (1948)
- Guitar Quintet, Op. 143 (1950) for guitar and string quartet
- "Aria" from the Concerto da camera, Op. 146a (1964) for oboe, cello and piano; also arranged for oboe, cello and guitar
- String Trio in D Minorfor violin, viola and cello, Op. 147 (1950)
- Piano Quintet No. 2 (Memories of the Tuscan Countryside), Op. 155 (1951)
- Choral with Variations in F for four horns Op. 162 (1953)
- Songs of the Shulamite (from "The Song of Songs"), Op. 163 (1953) for voice, flute, harp and string quartet
- From the set of Greeting Cards, Op. 170
  - Ein Quartett-Satz for String Quartet on the Name of Walter Arlen, Op. 170/28
- Pastorale and Rondo, Op. 185 (1958) for clarinet, violin, cello and piano
- String Quartet No. 3, "Casa al Dono", Op. 203 (1964)
- Eclogues for flute, English horn and guitar, Op. 206 (1965)
- Transcriptions
  - "Contrapunctus IV" from The Art of Fugue by Bach (1952) for eleven instruments fl, ob, Eng hn, cl, bn, hn, strings

== Orchestral ==
- Cielo di settembre, Op. 1a (1912–1915), arranged for orchestra
- Cipressi, Op. 17a (1921), arranged for orchestra
- Cipressi, Op. 17b (1941), second arrangement for orchestra
- Ouverture per "La Bisbetica domata", Op. 61 (1930)
- Ouverture per "La Dodicesima notte, Op. 73 (1933)
- Overture per "Il Mercante di Venezia", Op. 76 (1933)
- Ouverture per "Giulio Cesare", Op. 78 (1934)
- Ouverture per "Il Racconto d'inverno, Op. 80 (1934)
- I Giganti della Montagna; due episodi sinfonici, Op. 94a (1937)
- Overture to "A Midsummer Night's Dream", Op. 108 (1940)
- Overture to "King John, Op. 111 (1941)
- Indian Songs and Dances (based on American Indian themes), Op. 116 (1942)
- Five Humoresques on Themes of Foster, Op. 121 (1943)
- Overture to "Antony and Cleopatra", Op. 134 (1947)
- Overture to "The Tragedy of Coriolanus", Op. 135 (1947)
- Overture to "Much Ado about Nothing", Op. 164 (1953)
- Overture to "As You Like It", Op. 166 (1953)
- Four Dances for "Love's Labour's Lost", Op. 167 (1953)
- Works without Opus
  - Bas-relief (La reine Nefertiti) (1937) for orchestra [2 fl (picc), 2 ob, Engl hn, 2 cl, 2 bn, 4 hn, 3 tpt, 3 tbn, tuba, perc, harp, celesta, xylo (or piano), harp & strings]
- Transcriptions
  - "Nachtstück", Op. 23, No. 4 by Robert Schumann (c. 1913-1916) for orchestra (2fl, 2ob, Engl hn, 2 cl, 4 hn, harp and strings)
  - "Partita in B Minor for Violin Solo" by J. S. Bach (1942) arranged for string orchestra.
  - "La Vallée des Cloches" from Miroirs by Ravel (1950) for orchestra

== Incidental music ==
- Savonarola. Incidental music for a drama by Rino Alessi, Op. 81 (1935) for solo voices, mixed chorus. and orchestra
- I Giganti della Montagna; musiche di scena, per il dramma di Luigi Pirandello, Op. 94 (1937) for orchestra
- Morning in Iowa. Incidental Music to a Narrative Poem by Robert Nathan, Op. 158 (1953) for narrator, clarinet, accordion, guitar, bass viol and percussion

== Concertante ==
- Violin
  - Violin Concerto No. 1, Op. 31 (1924) "Concerto italiano"
  - Violin Concerto No. 2, Op. 66 (1931) "I Profeti" ('The Prophets') for Jascha Heifetz
  - Concerto No. 3 per violino e pianoforte, Op. 102 (1939) for Jascha Heifetz
- Piano
  - Concerto for Piano No. 1 in G major, Op. 46 (1927)
  - Concerto for Piano No. 2 in F major, Op. 92 (1936–7)
- Cello
  - Concerto for Violoncello in G minor, Op. 72 (1932–33) for Gregor Piatigorsky
- Harp
  - Concertino per arpa, quartetto d'archi e 3 clarinetti, Op. 93 (1936–37)
  - Concertino for harp and chamber orchestra, Op. 93a (1938)
- Oboe
  - Concerto da camera, Op. 146 (1950)
- Guitar
  - Capriccio diabolico (Omaggio a Paganini), Op. 85a (1945), arranged for guitar and orchestra
  - Guitar Concerto No. 1 in D major, Op. 99 (1939) for Andrés Segovia
  - Sérénade pour guitare et orchestre de chambre, Op. 118 (1943)
  - Guitar Concerto No. 2 in C major, Op. 160 (1953) "Concerto Sereno"
  - Concerto for Two Guitars, Op. 201 (1962)
- Transcriptions
  - "Suite No. 6 for viola pomposa" by J. S. Bach (1943) transcribed for violoncello solo and string orchestra.
  - "Figaro" from The Barber of Seville by Rossini (1944) for violin and orchestra

== Opera ==
- La Mandragola (prologue & 2 acts, after Niccolò Machiavelli), Op. 20, (1920–23), Venice, Fenice, May 1926; revision in 2 acts in German, Wiesbaden, Staatsoper, 1928
- Bacco in Toscana/Bacchus in Toskana (ditrambo in 1 atto da Francesco Redi), Op. 39 (1925–26)
- Aucassin et Nicolette. Chant-fable du XIIe siècle, pour une voix, quelques instruments et quelques marionettes. 12th-century chant-fable, Op; 98 (1938)
- Il mercante di Venezia (Versione ritmica dell'autore): 3 acts, from Shakespeare's original play, Op. 181 (1956), Florence, Comunale, 1962 (It.), Los Angeles, Shrine Auditorium, 1966 (Eng.)
- All's Well That Ends Well (Gigletta di Narbona): 3 acts after Shakespeare's original play, Op. 182 (1955–58), unperformed
- Saùl. 3 atti dalla tragedia de Vittorio Alfieri, Op. 191 (1958–60), unperformed
- The Importance of Being Ernest. Three Acts after the comedy of Oscar Wilde, Op. 198 (1961–62). Chamber opera for 8 soloists: 2 soprano, mezzo, contralto, 2 tenor, baritone, bass, two pianos, percussion. RAI, 1972; staged: New York, La Guardia, 22 Feb 1975

== Ballet ==
- Pesce turchino: balletto per orchestra da La Sirenetta e il pesce turchino, Op. 18a (1937)
- Bacco in Toscana (after F. Redi), Op. 39, 2 solo vv, chorus, orch, 1925-6, Milan, 1931
- The Birthday of the Infanta (A Ballet Suite from a tale by Oscar Wilde), Op. 115 (1941–42)
- The Octoroon Ball, A New Orleans Ballet (1840), Op. 136 (1947–49)

== Spoken/Narration ==
- The Princess and the Pea. A Miniature Overture for orchestra and narrator on a Tale by Anderson. Op. 120 (1943)
- Morning in Iowa, Op. 158 (1953) for narrator, accordion, banjo, clarinet, double bass, percussion
- Platero y yo para narrador y guitarra. Text by Juan Ramón Jiménez, Op. 190 (1960)
- 2 Balladen von Schiller. Melodrama für einen Sprecher, zwei Klaviere und Schlagzeug, Op. 193 (1961)
- Works without Opus
  - Noah's Ark, from "Genesis Suite" a collaboration with Shilkret, Toch, Tansman, Milhaud, Stravinsky and Schönberg for narrator and orchestra [2 fl, 2 ob, 3 cl, 2 bn, 4 hn, 2 tpt, 3 tbn, tuba, timp, perc, harp, piano & strings].

== Choral ==
- Lo the Messiah: Ecco il Messia (Lucrezia Tornabuoni de Medici) from "Savonarola", Op. 81c (1940) [aka "Two Songs of Praise (Due Laudi)", pt. 1] for women's chorus (SSA) and piano, arranged for mixed chorus (SATB) and piano (1943), arranged for men's chorus (TTBB) and piano (1943)
- Mary, Star of the Sea: Maria, Stella Maris (Girolamo Savonarola) from "Savonarola", Op. 81b (1940) [aka "Two Songs of Praise (Due Laudi)", pt. 2] for women's chorus (SSA), arranged for mixed chorus (SSATTB) and piano (1945)
- Lecha Dodi (for the synagogue of Amsterdam). Acrostic poem by Schelomo Halevi Alkabetz, Op. 90 (1936) for unaccompanied male chorus (TTBB) and cantor
- Lecha Dodi (for the synagogue of Amsterdam). Acrostic poem by Schelomo Halevi Alkabetz, Op. 90a (1943) for cantor (tenor), mixed chorus (SATB) and organ
- Processional Song in Praise of Saint Ephesius Goccius, Op. 96 (1937) for mixed chorus (SATB) with soprano solo
- 6 Scottish Songs (Poems by Sir Walter Scott), Op. 100 (1939) arranged for mixed chorus (SATB) and piano (1943)
- Keats songs, Op. 113 (1942–51) for mixed chorus (SATB) and piano, #4. "On the Grasshopper and the Cricket" arranged for women's chorus (SSA) and piano (1951)
- London (Upon Westminster Bridge), Op. 114 (1942) for mixed chorus (SATB) and piano
- Le Rossignol. Words by Frère Joseph, François Lecler du Tremblay, Op. 117 (1942) arranged for women's voices (SSA) and piano (1942), arranged for unaccompanied mixed chorus (SATB) (1942)
- Sacred Service (for the Sabbath Eve), Op. 122/1 (1943) for baritone (cantor), mixed chorus (SATB) and organ
- Addenda to the "Sacred Service", Op. 122/2 (1950) for chorus (SATB) and organ
- Shakespeare Sonnets, Op. 125/2 (1945) for mixed chorus (SATB) and piano, #2 (Sonnet Nr. CXXIX) for unaccompanied mixed chorus (SATB)
- Shakespeare Sonnets, Op. 125/3 (1945) for unaccompanied mixed chorus (SATB)
- Aubade. Poem by William Davenant (1673), Op. 126a (1945) for mixed chorus (SATB) and piano
- Carol for Candlemas Day. Anonymous (1661), Op.126b (1945) for mixed chorus (SATB) and piano
- To His Son. Poem by Dr. Richard Corbet (1582-1635), Lord Bishop of Norwich, Op. 126c (1945) for mixed chorus (SATB) and piano
- Venice (on the extinction of the Venetian Republic 1802). Text by William Wordsworth and Mario Castelnuovo-Tedesco, Op. 132 (1946) for unaccompanied male chorus (TTBB)
- Naomi and Ruth: A Small Cantata for Women's Voices, from the Book of Ruth, Op. 137 (1947) for women's voices (SMzA) and piano or organ
- The Book of Ruth. A Biblical Oratorio for soloists, mixed chorus and orchestra, Op. 140 (1949) [based on Naomi and Ruth, opus 137] for solo voices [2 sopranos, mezzo, 2 tenors, 2 baritones, bass], mixed chorus and orchestra [3 fl(picc), 2 ob, 3 cl (b cl), 2 bn, 4 hn, 3 tpt, 3 tbn, timp, perc, piano (celesta), harp & strings]
- Songs and Processionals for a Jewish Wedding, Op. 150 (1950), Nos. 1 and 2 for mixed chorus (SATB) and piano, or organ
- The Book of Jonah. A Biblical Oratorio for male chorus and orchestra, Op. 151 (1951) for tenor, baritone, men's chorus (TTBB), narrator, orchestra [ 2 alto sax, 2 ten sax (2 cl), baritone sax (b cl), 3 tpt, 3 tbn, timp, perc, 2 piano, 2 cello, 2 bass]
- Romancero gitano. Poetry by Federico García Lorca, Op. 152 (1951) for mixed chorus (SATB) and guitar
- Four Christina Rossetti Settings, Op. 153 (1951) for women's chorus (SSA) and piano
- Three Shelley Songs Op. 154 (1951), for women's chorus (SSA) and piano
- Six Keats settings, Op. 157 (1952). 1-3 for unaccompanied mixed chorus (SATB), 4-6 for men's unaccompanied men's chorus (TTBB)
- The Queen of Sheba: A Small Cantata, Op. 161 (1953) for women's chorus, soprano and piano
- The Book of Proverbs. Six choral settings, Op. 168 (1953) for unaccompanied men's chorus (TTBB)
- Lament of David for the Death of Jonathan, Op. 169 (1953), for double mixed chorus a cappella and tenor solo
- Songs of the Oceanides: from Aeschylus' "Prometheus Bound", Op. 171 (1954) for women's chorus (SSA), two flutes, harp, also arranged for women's chorus (SSA) and piano
- The Song of Songs. A Rustic Wedding Idyll, Op. 172 (1955) for soprano, tenor, baritone, mixed chorus (SATB), dancers, and orchestra [fl, 2 ob, 2 cl, bn, tpt, 2 hn, perc, timp, harp & strings]
- Three Shelley Songs, Op. 173 (1955) for women's voices (SSA) and piano
- Two Motets: from the Gospel according to St. John, Op. 174 (1955) for unaccompanied mixed chorus (SATB)
- Six carols on early English poems, Op. 175 (1955) for unaccompanied mixed chorus (SATB)
- The Fiery Furnace. A Small Cantata from The Book of Daniel, Op. 183 (1958), chamber cantata for baritone (narrator), children's chorus, piano (organ), and percussion
- Endymion. Text by John Keats, Op. 184 (1958) for unaccompanied mixed chorus (SAATTBB)
- Lauda in honore Sanctae Birgittae (Nicolaus Hermansson, 1326-1391), Op. 189/2 (1960) for unaccompanied women's chorus
- Memorial Service for the Departed, Op. 192 (1960) for cantor (tenor or baritone), mixed chorus (SATB) and organ
- Les Amours de Ronsard. 12 chansons à 4 voix mixtes. Pierre de Ronsard (1524-1585), Op. 197 (1961) for unaccompanied mixed chorus (SATB)
- The Book of Esther. A Biblical Oratorio, Op. 200 (1962) for soprano, tenor, baritone and bass soloists. narrator, mixed chorus (SATB) and orchestra [3 fl (picc), 2 ob, Engl. hn, 3 cl (b cl), 2 bn (c bn), 4 hn, 3 tpt, 3 tbn, tuba, perc, xylo, 2 harps, strings]
- The Seventh Day. Motet for Mixed Choir from "The Confessions of St. Augustine, Op. 202 (1963) for unaccompanied mixed chorus (SATB)
- The Book of Tobit. Tobias and the Angel. A Scenic Oratorio in Three Parts, Op. 204 (1964-65) for soprano, 2 contralto, tenor, baritone, 2 bass, chorus, narrator, mime, dancers and orchestra [ 2 fl, ob, 2 cl, bn, hn, 2 tpt, 2 tbn, timp, perc, harp, piano & strings]
- Works without Opus
  - A Galatea. Due Madrigali dalle Bucolichi di Virgilio (1914) for four voices.
  - Un Madrigale di Michelangelo (1916) for mixed chorus and orchestra (never orchestrated)
  - 2 Canti greci per coro a 4 voci. Poesie popolari tradotte da Niccolò Tommaseo (1917) for unaccompanied mixed chorus (SATB)
  - A Lullaby (on Foster's themes) (1942) for soprano, baritone, mixed chorus (SATB) and orchestra [2 fl, 2 ob, 2 cl, 2 bn, 2 hn, 2 tpt, perc, timp, harp, celesta & strings].
  - Jubilee Songs (1942) for unaccompanied mixed chorus (SATB)
  - Liberty, Mother of Exiles. Words by Emma Lazarus (1944) for mixed chorus (SATB) and piano
  - Kol nidrei (1944) for cello, organ, cantor and mixed chorus (SATB)
  - The Owl. Words by Alfred Lord Tennyson (1945) for mixed voices (SABass)
  - Naaritz'cho (second k'dushah) (1952) for cantor (baritone), mixed chorus (SATB) and organ
  - Cherry-ripe, words by Thomas Campion (1567-1619) (1955) for unaccompanied mixed chorus
  - Epilogue. Sonnet CV from "The Merchant of Venice" (1956) for mixed chorus (SATB) and piano
  - Lemons. Text by Lawrence Durrell (1960) for women's voices (SSA) and piano
  - Children's Song, from "The Children of Dom Sierot". Text by Ulric de Vaere (1967) for unaccompanied women's chorus (SSA)

== Film music ==
Credited contributions

- The Return of the Vampire (1943)
- The Black Parachute (1944)
- She's a Soldier Too (1944)
- And Then There Were None (1945)
- Time Out of Mind (1947)
- The Loves of Carmen (1948)
- Rogues of Sherwood Forest (1950)
- The Brave Bulls (1951)
- Mask of the Avenger (1951)
- The Brigand (1952)
- The Long Wait (1954)

Uncredited contributions as "composer of original music" (selected)

- The Stars Look Down (1940) (US version)
- Dr. Jekyll and Mr. Hyde (1941)
- The Affairs of Martha (1942)
- Harrigan's Kid (1943)
- In Our Time (1944)
- Main Street After Dark (1945)
- Escape in the Fog (1945)
- A Letter for Evie (1946)
- Desire Me (1947)

Uncredited contributions as "composer of stock music" (selected)

- Seven Sweethearts (1942)
- Cry of the Werewolf (1944)
- Manhunt of Mystery Island (1945)
- Just Before Dawn (1946)
- Bulldog Drummond at Bay (1947)
- Alias a Gentleman (1948)
- The Stratton Story (1949)
- Brave Warrior (1952)
- Man in the Dark (1953)
- Charge of the Lancers (1954)
- Creature with the Atom Brain (1955)
- The Werewolf (1956)
- Zombies of Mora Tau (1957)
- Stop! Look! and Laugh! (1960)
- The Love Machine (1971)
