= Trygve Madsen =

Norwegian composer and pianist

Trygve Madsen (born 15 February 1940) is a Norwegian composer and pianist.

== Early life and education ==
Born in Fredrikstad, Madsen demonstrated musical ability at an early age when he began to learn to play the piano at age six and first started composing aged seven. Madsen went on to study under Egil Hovland and Erik Werba, and developed an interest in everything from the Russian masters Prokofiev and Shostakovich to the works of Bach, Haydn, Mozart, Verdi, Tchaikovsky, Richard Strauss, and Ravel. Madsen's personal interest in playing jazz piano and the influence that pianists such as Art Tatum, Erroll Garner and Oscar Peterson had on him can be heard in his use of the piano.

== Career ==
Trygve Madsen produced an extensive number of works, including many published by Musikk-Husets Forlag – in 2009, the company had 125 works by Madsen in their catalogue. The composer has gained recognition upon the inclusion of his work in music syllabuses internationally. The Associated Board of the Royal Schools of Music included the Prelude and Fugue in C (Opus 101) as one of the optional pieces for Grade 8 pianists, and in 2009 The Dream of the Rhinoceros was used as an obligatory piece at a Polish national horn competition. Aside from printed music, the composer has also had his work featured on thirty-six CDs, eight of which were solely dedicated to his work.

== Production ==
=== Selected works ===
- Einladung zu eine Reise mit Mozart und vier Hornisten
- Konzert für Trompete und Orchester
- Circus Terra, an opera with libretto by Jon Bing
- Suite for Flute and Piano, Op. 2
- Sonata for Horn and Piano, Op. 24
- Concerto #1 for Piano and Orchestra, Op. 27
- Sextet for Piano and Brass Quintet, Op. 32
- Sonata for viola and piano, Op. 33
- Sonata for Tuba and Piano, Op. 34, dedicated to Roger Bobo
- Concerto for Tuba and Orchestra, Op. 35, dedicated to Michael Lind
- Divertimento for Horn, Tuba, and Piano, Op. 43
- Concertino for Horn and Orchestra, Op. 45, commissioned by the French government
- Divertimento for Brass Band and Percussion, Op. 47
- Introduction and Allegro for Tuba Solo and Symphonic Band, Op. 50
- Symphony #1, Op. 54
- Concerto for Euphonium and Orchestra, Op. 55
- Music to an Exhibition for 2 Trumpets, Horn, 2 Euphoniums, and Tuba, Op. 59
- Symphony #2, Op. 66
- The Mysterious Barricades II for Trumpet, Horn, Tuba, and Piano, Op. 82
- Tuba Marmalade for Euphonium/Tuba Quartet, Op. 84
- Brass Marmalade for Brass Band, Op. 85
- Sonata for Trumpet and Piano, Op. 90
- The Dream of the Rhinoceros, for solo horn, Op. 92
- Sonata for Euphonium and Piano, Op. 97
- 24 Preludes and Fugues, Op. 101
- De Fire Riker, for solo oboe
- Aurora, opera

== Discography ==
- Det Norske Fløyteensemble, From Norway (2011)
- Fredrik Fors, Sveinung Bjelland, Black Bird (2009)
- Jens Harald Bratlie, Trygve Madsen: 24 Preludes & Fugues (2006)
- Alexander Vitlin, Alina Luschtschizkaja, Apostolos Palios, Julia Severus, Mare - Two Pianos Four Pianists (2006)
- Tori Stødle, Pianomusts (2006)
- Frøydis Ree Wekre, Ceros (2005)
- Sketches of Norway (2004)
- Arild Stav, Dawn (2001)
- Frédérique Lagarde, Odile Sordoillet, The Saxophones (2001)
- Sonatas, Marmalades & Faxes, with Philippe Duchesne (bass saxophone), Quatuor Jean Ledieu, Alain Jousset (tenor saxophone), Frédérique Lagarde (piano), Philippe Portejoie (alto saxophone), Quatuor De Clarinettes Francilien, Sylvie Hue (clarinet) and Roger Boutry (piano), Hemera (Naxos), HCD2921 (1997)
- Frode Thorjussen, Nora Kulset, Eplemann! (1997)
- Jens Harald Bratlie, Trygve Madsen: Piano Works (1996)
- Frøydis Ree Wekre, Songs of the Wolf (1996)
- Brynjar Hoff, The Contemporary Oboe (1996)
- Frøydis Ree Wekre, Corno di Norvegia (1994)
- Øystein Baadsvik, Hindemith, Madsen, Gaathaug (1993)
- Skandinaviska Brassensemblen, Brass Festival (1985)
- Brynjar Hoff, Per Dreier, Brynjar Hoff (1982)
- Brynjar Hoff, Kaare Ørnung, Great Music for Oboe (1979)
