= Max d'Ollone =

French composer

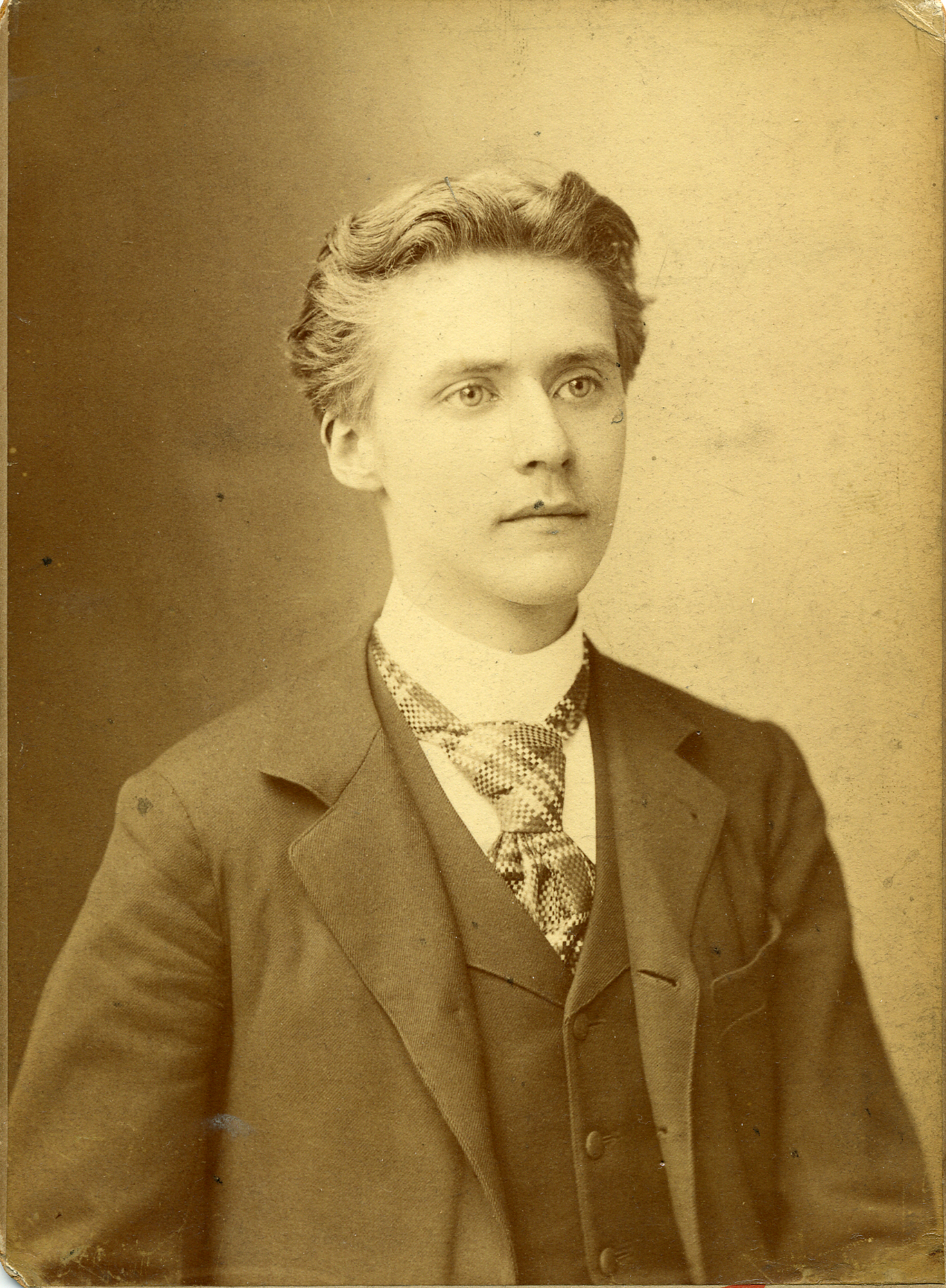
Max d'Ollone photographed by Nadar

Maximilien-Paul-Marie-Félix d'Ollone (13 June 1875 – 15 May 1959) was a 20th-century French composer.

== Life and career ==
Born in Besançon, d'Ollone started composing very early, entering the Paris Conservatoire at 6, winning many prizes, receiving the encouragement of Gounod, Saint-Saëns, Massenet, Thomas and Delibes. His teachers at the Conservatoire were Lavignac, Massenet, Gédalge and Lenepveu; he won the Prix de Rome in 1897.

He was director of music in Angers, professor at the Paris Conservatoire and director of the Opéra-Comique. His work was part of the music event in the art competition at the 1912 Summer Olympics. In 1932 he wrote three important articles for Le Ménestrel (29 July, 9 and 16 December) arguing for a more populist approach to composition.

At the time of the German occupation of France during World War II, d'Ollone was a member of the Groupe Collaboration.

In addition to the works listed below, d'Ollone produced a number of song cycles (including "Les Chants d'Ailleurs"; " Les Chants d'Exil"; "Impressions d'Automne"), which demonstrate a considerable mastery of the French mélodie. There are several works for orchestra, solo instrument and orchestra, and piano works.

== Works ==
=== Stage works ===
- Jean (opera in five acts, 1900–1905).
- Bacchus et Silène (ballet, 1901, Béziers).
- Le Retour (drame lyrique in two acts to his own libretto, 1911, Angers).
- Les Amants de Rimini (opera in four acts to his own libretto).
- L'Étrangère (opera in two acts, 1913).
- Les Uns et les Autres (comédie lyrique in one act with text by Paul Verlaine, 6 November 1922, Opéra-Comique).
- L'Arlequin (comédie lyrique in five acts, 22 December 1924, Paris Opera).
- George Dandin (opéra comique in three acts after Molière, 1930).
- Le Temple abandonné (one-act ballet, 1931, Monte Carlo).
- La Samaritaine (opera in three acts after Rostand, 1937, Paris).
- Sous les Saules (musical comedy in four acts after Andersen, 1950).
- Olympe de Clèves (opera in four acts after Dumas, unpublished).

=== Orchestral ===
- Les villes maudites, symphonic poem (1895).
- Lamento (1908).
- Au cimetière, Symphonic Poem (1908).
- Le Roi des Aulnes, Film score (1930).

=== Concertante ===
- Fantaisie for piano and orchestra in E-flat major (1897)
- Le menetrier, poem for violin and orchestra (published by Heugel, 1911)
- Fantaisie orientale, for clarinet and orchestra (reduction published by Leduc, ca.2010)

=== Voice and Orchestra ===
- Daphné (cantata composed for the Prix de Rome (1894).
- Frédégonde, Lyrical Scene after Charles Morel (1894).
- Melusine, Lyrical Scene after Beissier (1894).
- Clarissa Harlowe, Cantata (1895).
- La Vision de Dante (Lyrical Poem for soloists, choir and orchestra (1899).
- Saint François d'Assise, Oratorio (1910)
- Elévation (1912).
- Hymne du matin, for soprano et orchestra after Lamartine (1943).

=== Chamber music ===
- String Quartet in D major (1898)
- Piano Quartet in E minor
- Fantaisie orientale for clarinet and piano
- Piano Trio in A minor (published 1921)
- Andante et Allegro en style ancien for flute and piano (dedicated to Philippe Gaubert, published 1926)

=== Vocal music ===
- Frédégonde, winning cantata for the Prix de Rome in 1897

== Recordings ==
- Le temple abandonné (2023); William and Mary Symphony Orchestra, 2023.
- Les villes maudites (2023); William and Mary Symphony Orchestra, 2023.
- Les funérailles du poète (2023); William and Mary Symphony Orchestra, 2023.
- Fantaisie, for piano (2023); Daniel Inamorato, piano; William and Mary Symphony Orchestra, 2023.
- Cantates et chœurs pour le prix de Rome; Brussels Philharmonic, Flemish Radio Choir, Hervé Niquet; Palazzetto Bru Zane; Ediciones Singulares, 2013.
- Les Villes Maudites, for orchestra; Brussels Philharmonic, Flemish Radio Choir, Hervé Niquet; Palazetto Bru Zane; Ediciones Singulares, 2013.
- Le Ménétrier, for violin and orchestra (1910); Mark Kaplan, Orchestra Simfonica de Barcelona i National de Catalunya, Lawrence Foster, Claves 2003.
- Lamento, for orchestra (1908); Orchestra Simfonica de Barcelona i National de Catalunya, Lawrence Foster, Claves 2003.
- Fantaisie for piano and orchestra (1999); François-Joël Thiollier, Orchestra Simfonica de Barcelona i National de Catalunya, Lawrence Foster, Claves 2003.
- La Samaritaine, opera (1937); Berthe Monmart, soprano; Tony Aubin, direction; Orchestre Lyrique de la Radio Diffusion Française et des Choeurs de la RTF, 1955, INA.
- Le Retour, opera (1912); Alain Pâris, direction; Choeur et orchestre Lyrique de Radio France, 1975.
- Mélodies vol. 1, including the cycle In Memoriam, Didier Henry, baryton, Patrice d'Ollone, piano, Maguelone.
- Mélodies Vol. 2, Elsa Maurus, mezzo-soprano; Didier Henry, baryton; Patrice d'Ollone, piano; Maguelone.
- Trio for piano, violin and cello (1920); Quatuor Athenæum Enesco and Patrice d'Ollone, piano; éd. disques Pierre Verany, Arion, 1999.
- Quartet for piano and strings (1949); Quatuor Athenæum Enesco and Patrice d'Ollone, piano; Discs Pierre Verany, Arion, 1999.
- String quartet (1898); Athenæum Enesco Quartet; Disques Pierre Verany, Arion, 1999.
- Trio for piano, violin and cello (1920); Trio Anima Mundi, Melbourne.
- Trio pour piano, violin and cello (1920); Dimitris Saroglou, piano; Gérard Poulet, violin; Dominique de Williencourt, cello; Europe et Art, 2011.
- Chamber music; Alessandro Carbonare, clarinet; Philippe Pierlot, flute; Régis Poulain, bassoon; Elisabeth Glab, violin; Jean-Luc Bourré, Emmanuel Petit, Emma Savouret, Stéphane Manent, cello; Isabelle Perrin, harp; Parisii Quartet; Patrice d'Ollone, piano; Angéline Pondepeyre, piano; Maguelone, 2005.
- Fantaisie orientale (1913); Sylvie Hue, clarinet; Roger Boutry, piano, REM.
- Andante et scherzo, for three cellos (1933); Gürzenich Cello Trio, Westdeutscher Rundfunk, Köln, ANA records.
- Andante et scherzo, for three cellos (1933); Members of Orchestra Simfonica de Barcelona i National de Catalunya, Claves 2003.
- Romance et tarentelle (1928); Régis Poulain, bassoon; and Angeline Pondepeyre, piano; Maguelone, 1996.
- Etudes de concert (1904); Dimitris Saroglou, piano; Europe et Art, 2011.

== Biographies ==
- Alexandre Dratwicki and Patrice d'Ollone: Max d'Ollone and the Prix de Rome (Venise, Palazetto Bru-Zane, 2013).
- Georges Favre: Silhouettes du Conservatoire : Charles-Marie Widor, André Gédalge, Max d'Ollone (La Pensée universelle, 1986).
- Henri Rabaud: Correspondence avec Daniel Halévy et Max d'Ollone et écrits de jeunesse.
- Euridyce Jousse and Yves Gérard: Lettres de compositeurs à Camille Saint-Saëns (Symétrie, 2009).
- Julia Lu and Alexandre Dratwicki: Le concours du prix de Rome de musique (Symétrie et Palazetto bru-Zane, 2011).
- Brigitte François-Sappey and Gilles Cantagrel: Guide de la mélodie et du lied (Fayard, 1994).
- René Dumesnil: La musique en France entre les deux guerres, (Editions du milieu du monde, 1946).
- Karine Le Bail: La musique au pas, être musicien sous l'occupation (CNRS Editions, 2016).
- Yannick Simon: Composer sous Vichy (Symétrie, 2009).
- Rose-Noëlle Lenain: Max d'Ollone ou les partances vaines, mémoires de musicologie (Université Paris-Sorbonne, 1989).
