= Ida Presti =

French musician (1924–1967)

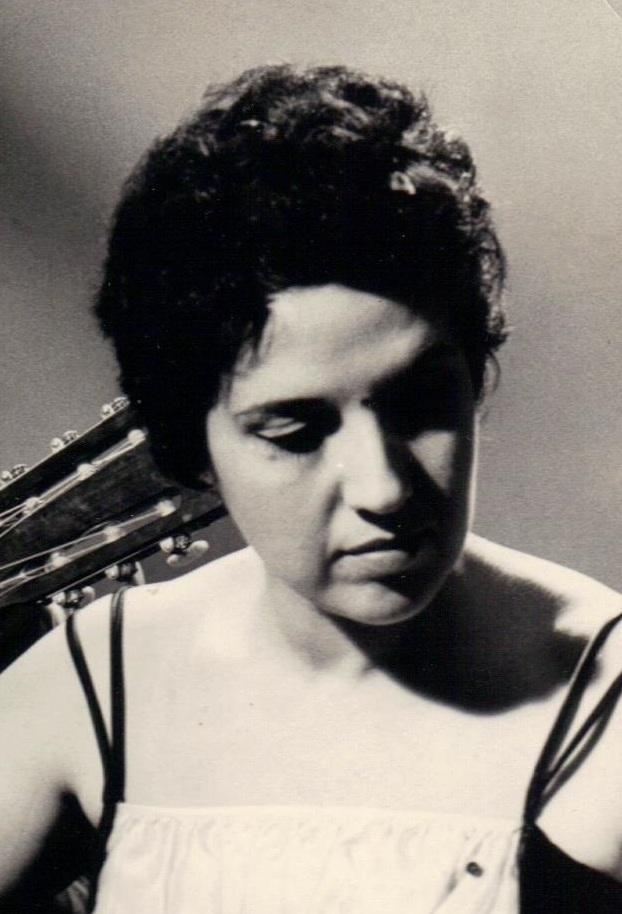

Background information
- Born: 31 May 1924; Suresnes, Île-de-France, France
- Died: 24 April 1967 (aged 42) Rochester, New York, U.S.
- Genres: Classical guitar
- Occupations: Guitarist; composer
- Instrument: Guitar
- Years active: 1938-1967
- Spouse: Alexandre Lagoya (m. 1955)

Ida Presti (31 May 1924 – 24 April 1967) was a French classical guitarist and composer. She first came to prominence as a child prodigy, before maturing into what Alice Artzt has called "the greatest guitarist of the 20th century, and possibly of all time."

== Life and career ==
=== Early life ===
Presti was born Yvette Montagnon in Suresnes, a suburb of Paris, France, to a French father and Sicilian mother. Her father, Claude Montagnon, was her first teacher, and he thought that "Ida Presti" sounded better than 'Yvette Montagnon' (Presti came from her mother's name, Olga-Gracia Lo Presti). She also studied harmony and music theory with guitarist and luthier Mario Maccaferri. Presti played in public for the first time when she was eight, and gave her first full-length concert at the age of ten, on 28 April 1935 at the Salle Pleyel in Paris. Lauded for her prodigious talent by her teachers and contemporaries, she recorded for La Voix de son maître in 1937. While still under twelve, she played at the Pasdeloup concerts and the Société des Concerts du Conservatoire for two consecutive years.

At age 14, she appeared in the 1938 film La Petite Chose as a guitar player in a supporting role and, as a 16-year-old, she played Paganini's guitar during a commemoration of the centennial of his death in 1940.

=== Solo career ===
On 16 September 1948, Presti gave the French premiere of Rodrigo's Concierto de Aranjuez, which was broadcast on radio from Paris and also carried on several other continental stations. She gave her first recital in London on 1 December 1951, The Times noting "her truly astonishing right hand dexterity and her lively temperament." After a recital the following year, The Times commented, "When Miss Ida Presti, a young French guitarist, made her English début last autumn it was her prestidigitation that lingered in the memory. Her reappearance early in the week at Wigmore Hall confirmed this first impression of brilliance but also gave further evidence of sterling musicianship."

=== Guitar duo ===
Presti & Lagoya 1964 tour of Southern Africa organised by Hans Adler.

After her second marriage, to the guitarist Alexandre Lagoya, she stopped performing as a solo artist and formed the Duo Presti-Lagoya with him, concentrating on works for two guitars. The two formed one of the most accomplished classical guitar duos in history, performing over 2,000 concerts.

A number of composers wrote works for the duo, including:

- Mario Castelnuovo-Tedesco: Sonatina canonica, Op. 196 (1961); Les Guitares bien tempérées, Op. 199 (1962); Concerto for Two Guitars and Orchestra, Op. 201 (1962). In addition, Castelnuovo-Tedesco wrote Fuga elegiaca (1967) on the occasion of Ida Presti's death, following a request by John W. Duarte.
- Jean-Yves Daniel-Lesur: Élégie (1956).
- Pierre Petit: Tarantelle (1959); Toccata (1959).
- Joaquín Rodrigo: Tonadilla (1959). Rodrigo finished another piece for two guitars, the Concierto Madrigal, in 1966, but Presti died before she and Lagoya could perform it. Angel and Pepe Romero subsequently gave the first performance of it in July 1967.
- Pierre Wissmer: Prestilagoyana (1969).

=== Marriages ===
At the age of 19, Presti married Henry Rigaud (sometimes spelled Rigo) in 1943, and they had a daughter the following year.

She met the classical guitarist Alexandre Lagoya in 1951, and a year later they married.

=== Death ===
On 24 April 1967, Presti died at Strong Memorial Hospital in Rochester, New York, at the age of 42 during a concert tour in the United States. Presti had been coughing up blood for several days and was first examined at a hospital in St. Louis. Although advised to remain there, the couple flew to Rochester, New York, where their next concert was scheduled to be held, and Presti was brought to the hospital directly from the airport. Presti died of a massive internal hemorrhage due to a tumor in her lung, while doctors struggled in vain to control the bleeding.

== Compositions ==
Guitar solo

- Six Études (Paris: Max Eschig, 1958)
- Danse rythmique (Paris: Ricordi, 1959)
- Étude du matin (Washington DC: Columbia, 1966)
- Segovia (Ancona: Bèrben, 2003)
- Œuvres complètes pour guitare seule (Étude n. 1 d’arpèges – Étude n. 2 en accords – Étude n.3 en pensant à Bach – Étude joyeuse – Prélude en pensant à Bach – Improvisation – Isabelle – Étude di Matin – Six études – Danse Rythmique – Segovia) Édition intégrale révisée par Olivier Chassain – Présentation de Frédéric Zigante. Bèrben E. 5910 B.
- Étude n°7 Révision d'Isabelle Presti, Thibaut Garcia et Antonin Vercellino (Éditions Habanera, 2025)

Guitar duo

- Danse d'Avila (Paris: Ricordi, 1959)
- Étude No. 1 (Paris: Ricordi, 1959)
- Prélude No. 1 (Paris: Ricordi, 1959)
- Œuvres complètes pour deux guitares guitares (Sérénade – Valse de l’an nouveau – Chanson et Jeux – Étude n. 1 – Dance gitane – Berceuse à ma Mère – Danse d’ Avila – Étude n. 2 – Prélude – Tarentelle – La hongroise – Bagatelle – Étude fantasque – Espagne) – Édition intégrale révisée par Olivier Chassain – Présentation de Frédéric Zigante. Collection Ida Presti – Alexandre Lagoya – Bèrben E. 5800 B.

== Recordings ==
- Ida Presti et Luise Walker – Les Grandes dames de la guitare Pearl, Pavilion Records (9133 GEMM CD)
- Art de Alexandre Lagoya avec Ida Presti. Philipps 2004 (6-CD set)
- Some photos of LP covers (Oviatt Library Digital Collections)
- Recital at festival in Aix-en-Provence
- The Art of Ida Presti – Studio Recordings 1938–1956 [IDI(Ital Disc Inst) Records, April 2012]
- Les Compositions d'Ida Presti pour deux guitares (Ida Presti: Compositions for Two Guitars). SIMAX Classics (September 2009); ASIN B002OQ004O

== Bibliography ==
- Graham Wade: A Concise History of the Classic Guitar (Pacific, Missouri: Mel Bay, 2001); ISBN 0-7866-4978-X, pp. 134–136, 198. (online copy, p. 134–, at Google Books)
- Ernie Jackson: The Everything Guitar Book (Avon, Massachusetts: F+W Publications, 2007); ISBN 978-1-59869-250-1, p. 153 (online copy, p. 153, at Google Books)
- Hannu Annala, Heiki Mätlik: Handbook of Guitar and Lute Composers (Pacific, Missouri: Mel Bay, 2008); ISBN 978-0-7866-5844-2, p. 117 (online copy, p. 117, at Google Books)
- Eleftheria Kotzia: "Wish you were here: Ida Presti (1924–1967)", in: Classical Guitar, May 1992.
- Alice Artzt: "Ida Presti. Another Point of View", in: Classical Guitar, August 2007, pp. 28
- Anne Marillia & Elisabeth Presti: Ida Presti — sa vie, son art / Her Life, Her Art (Ancona: Bèrben, 2005) (Online-Review)
- Haag, John (2002). "Presti, Ida (1924–1967)". Women in World History: A Biographical Encyclopedia. Archived from the original on September 24, 2015 – via HighBeam Research.
