= Alice Artzt =

American guitarist from New York City

Alice Artzt (born March 16, 1943) is an American guitarist from New York City.

She studied with Julian Bream, Ida Presti and Alexandre Lagoya and made her concert debut in 1969 at the Wigmore Hall, London. Since then, she has played concerts in parts of Europe, Africa, Central America, Asia, the United States, and South America.

She is an avid Charlie Chaplin enthusiast.
