= Frédérique Lagarde =

French pianist

Frédérique Lagarde is a contemporary French pianist.

== Biography ==
After her training at the Conservatoire de Paris, in 1986, she founded with Philippe Portejoie a duo saxophone -piano which has given hundreds of concerts in the world and was laureate of the Menuhin foundation in 1990 and prize for the best French formation at the Concours international de musique de chambre de Paris in 1992. This duo is dedicatee to numerous works by composers including Pierre-Max Dubois, Lucie Robert-Diessel and Richard Phillips.

As soloist or in duo, Frédérique Lagarde has participated in various programs of Radio France and recorded numerous discs.

== Selected discography ==
- Saxophone et Piano (Maurice Ravel, Pierre-Max Dubois, Paule Maurice, Alfred Desenclos, Roger Boutry, Lucie Robert-Diessel, Alain Margoni), duo Portejoie-Lagarde, Collection Musique française du XX^{e}, 1992, Chamade, CHCD 5604
- Dédicaces pour saxophone et piano, duo Portejoie Lagarde, Sylvie Hue, Fusako Kondo, 1996, Pierre Vérany. (contains Preludes for piano and saxophone by Roger Lersy and others contemporary works by Boutry, Dubois, Laferrière and Margoni)
- Contre-chant, Musique française du XX^{e} (Francis Poulenc, Jacques Castérède, Roger Boutry, Nicolas Bacri, Pierre Sancan), with clarinettist Sylvie Hue, Le Chant de Linos, 2008, CK 09039
- Carte blanche au compositeur Dominique Probst (Debussy, Kodaly, Poulenc, Kosma, Probst), with Tatiana Probst (soprano), Patricia Nagle (flute), Frédérique Lagarde (piano) and Dominique Probst (percussion), 2008, Fondation Hippocrène.
- Jonction, etc (Timothy Hayward, Roger Boutry, Richard Phillips, Joe Makholm, Lucie Robert-Diessel
- François Rossé, duo Portejoie-Lagarde, Believe/Corelia, 2009, CC874707
