= Jean Doyen =

French musician and composer (1907–1982)

Jean Doyen (8 March 1907 – 21 April 1982) was a French classical pianist, pedagogue and composer.

== Biography ==
Jean Doyen was born in Paris on 8 March 1907. He graduated from the Conservatoire de Paris as pianist in 1922. He began learning the instrument with Sophie Chéné (teacher of Blanche Selva), then studied with Louis Diémer (1919) and finally with Marguerite Long. In 1924, he made his solo debut with the Concerts Colonne. He also participated in Jacques Ibert's ballet Les Rencontres, at the Opera Garnier.

In 1926 he worked at the Radiodiffusion Française, but at the same time he returned to the Conservatoire in counterpoint class with Georges Caussade and music composition with Paul Vidal and Henri Büsser.

From 1941 to 1977, he was professor of piano at the Conservatoire de Paris, succeeding Marguerite Long. Among his pupils were İdil Biret, Roger Boutry, Philippe Entremont, Marie-Thérèse Fourneau, Claude Kahn, André Krust, Arthur Moreira Lima, Bernard Job, Dominique Merlet and Chantal Riou.

Doyen is best known for his interpretations of 19th and 20th century French music, notably in the works of Gabriel Pierné, Reynaldo Hahn and Vincent d'Indy and is considered one of the great interpreters of this repertoire and above all, of Maurice Ravel and Gabriel Fauré. He also enjoyed playing Vincent d'Indy's Fantaisie sur un vieil air de ronde française and Samazeuilh's Trois Danses. However, he recorded Chopin's waltzes, and premiered the Variations sur un thème de Don Juan.

As composer, he published one Requiem, a piano concerto, a suite in B, Marine for string quartet and female vocal quartet.

Doyen died in Versailles on 21 April 1982 at the age of 75. His daughter, Geneviève Doyen (1944–2004) was also a pianist. However, there is no relationship with Ginette Doyen (alias Geneviève Fournier, 1921–2002), married to and musical collaborator of violinist Jean Fournier, himself Pierre Fournier's brother.

== Discography ==
- Chopin's 14 waltzes (1956, LP Fontana 700.009 / Philips A77405L) OCLC 658636818
- Fauré's work for piano (1972, 4CDs Erato) OCLC 37861308
- Fauré's Piano Quartet No. 2 in G minor, Op. 45 - Trio Pasquier: Jean Pasquier (violin), Étienne Pasquier (cello), Jean Doyen (piano) (1964, Erato) OCLC 658715211
- Halffter's Rapsodia Portuguesa for piano and orchestra - Jean Doyen (piano); Orchestre du Conservatoire de Paris, conductor Charles Munch (October 1941/March 1942)
- Mozart's Piano Concerto No. 20, Fantasia in D minor K 397 - Orchestre de la Société des concerts du Conservatoire, dir. Charles Munch (23 December 1941 and 2 February 1942, Lys) OCLC 275727667
- Ravel's piano music, Concertos - Orchestre Lamoureux, dir. Jean Fournet (1954, Philips / 2CDs Accord) OCLC 658417979

== Bibliography ==
- Vignal, Marcauthor-link=Marc Vignal (2005). Dictionnaire de la musique (in French). Paris: Larousse. p. 312. ISBN 2-03-505545-8. OCLC 896013420. Vignal2005.
