= Alexandre Lagoya =

French guitarist and composer (1929–1999)

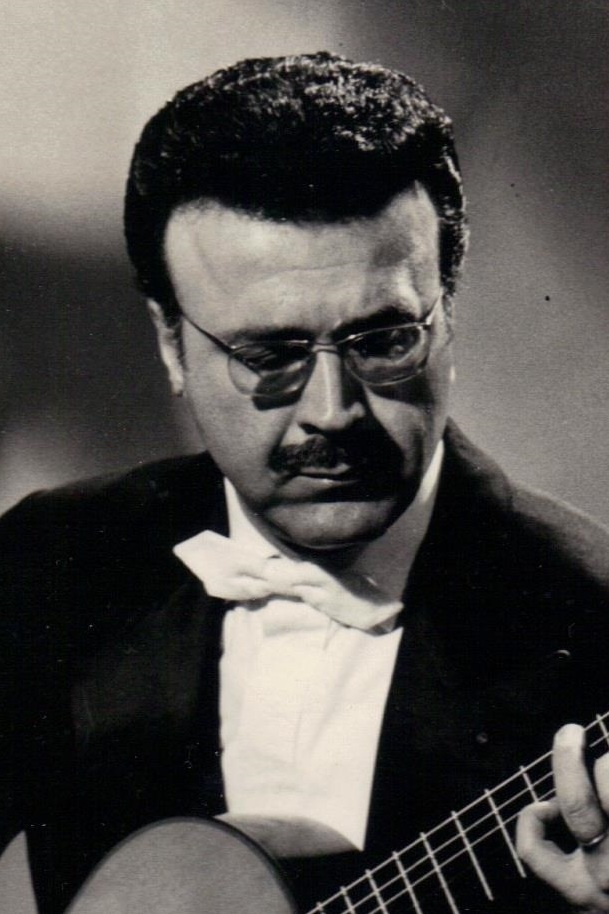

Background information
- Born: 29 June 1929; Alexandria, Egypt
- Died: 24 August 1999 (aged 70)
- Occupations: Guitarist; composer
- Instrument: Guitar
- Spouse: Ida Presti (m. 1955)

Alexandre Lagoya (29 June 1929 – 24 August 1999) was a French classical guitarist and composer. His early career included boxing and guitar, and as he cites on the sleeve of a 1981 Columbia album, his parents hoped he would outgrow his predilection for both.

== Life and career ==
Presti & Lagoya 1964 tour of Southern Africa organised by Hans Adler

Lagoya was born on 29 June 1929 in Alexandria, Egypt, to a Greek father and an Italian mother. By 1955, when he married the French guitarist Ida Presti, his career had already begun. On the sleeve of his 1981 record with Columbia, Lagoya pays deep tribute to Presti and admits that after her premature death he was unable to play for years. He returned to the guitar as a teacher, tutoring among other famous guitarists the Canadian virtuoso Liona Boyd (who claims in her autobiography that she was also his lover). In the early 1980s, aged 52, he burst back on the international scene with a record for Columbia and an international tour.

Lagoya played a variety of works for guitar, performing concerts and recording albums, often collaborating with Presti and also with other musicians. Lagoya was also a successful teacher. He taught at the Conservatoire de Paris and, in Canada, and developed a new method of hand positioning which he believed helped people learn to play the guitar better. He also added the use of the little finger to plucking and claimed to have invented a method for maximizing the sound coming from the classical guitar.

Concerning the right hand, Alexandre Lagoya preferred the technique of plucking from the right side of the nail, and he believed it gave a more powerful sound.

A number of composers wrote works for Lagoya and the Presti-Lagoya Duo, including:

- Daniel Jean-Yves Lesur: Élégie (1956).
- Pierre Petit: Tarantelle (1959); Toccata (1959).
- André Jolivet: Sérénade pour deux guitares (1959).
- Joaquín Rodrigo: Tonadilla (1959). Rodrigo finished another piece for two guitars, the Concierto Madrigal (first named Concierto para una Virreina de España, in 1966, but Presti died before she and Lagoya could perform it. Angel and Pepe Romero subsequently gave the first performance of it in Los Angeles in July 1970, 30 July.
- Pierre Wissmer: Prestilagoyana (1969).
- Mario Castelnuovo-Tedesco: Sonatina Canonica pour deux guitares, Op. 196 (1961).
- Mario Castelnuovo-Tedesco: Les Guitares bien tempérées - 24 Préludes et fugues pour deux guitares, Op. 199 (1962).
- Mario Castelnuovo-Tedesco: Concerto pour deux guitares et orchestre, Op. 201 (1962).
- Mario Castelnuovo-Tedesco: Fuga elegiaca pour deux guitares, Op. postuma (1967).
- Joaquín Rodrigo: Triptico para guitarra (1977).

== Selected compositions ==
Guitar solo

- Six Études (Paris: Max Eschig, 1958)
- Caprice (Paris: Ricordi, 1959)
- Rêverie (Paris: Ricordi, 1959)

Transcriptions

- Johann Sebastian Bach: Gavotte et musette (from BWV 808) (Paris: Ricordi, 1959), for 2 guitars
- Johann Sebastian Bach: Gavotte (from BWV 1012) (Paris: Ricordi, 1959), for solo guitar
- Georg Friedrich Händel: Sarabande (Paris: Ricordi, 1959), for solo guitar
- Domenico Scarlatti: Sonata (Paris: Ricordi, 1959), for 2 guitars
- Georg Friederich Handel: Ciaccona, Fugue et Allegro , for 2 guitars (Berben Edizioni, Collection Presti/Lagoya, vol. 1)
- Johann Sebastian Bach: Preludi e fughe dal Clavicembalo ben temperato (Berben Edizioni, Collection Presti/Lagoya vol. 2)
- Johann Sebastian Bach: Suites Inglesi e Francesi (Berben Edizioni, Collection Presti/Lagoya, vol. 3)
- Domenico Scarlatti: Six Sonatas (Berben Edizioni, Collection Presti/Lagoya, vol. 4)
- AA.VV.: 12 Baroque Masterpieces (Berben Edizioni, Collection Presti/Lagoya, vol. 5)
- Ida Presti: Œuvres originales pour deux guitares (ed. Olivier Chassain) (Berben Edizioni, Collection Presti/Lagoya vol. 6)
- Niccolò Paganini: Sonata Concertante (Berben Edizioni, Collection Presti/Lagoya, vol. 7)
- Franz Schubert: Sonata Arpeggione (Berben Edizioni, Collection Presti/Lagoya, vol. 8)
- Ludwig van Beethoven: Andante con varaizioni - Adagio - Sonatina (Berben Edizioni, Collection Presti/Lagoya, vol. 9)
