= Les Guitares bien tempérées =

Les Guitares bien tempérées (The Well-Tempered Guitars), Op. 199, for two guitars, is a work written in 1962 by Mario Castelnuovo-Tedesco. It consists of 24 pairs of preludes and fugues, one pair in each of the 24 major and minor keys. The 24 pieces are divided into four books. It has been described as the longest and most important cycle of works ever composed for two guitars. It was both inspired by and a tribute to Johann Sebastian Bach's The Well-Tempered Clavier, a work for solo keyboard.

== Composition ==
Castelnuovo-Tedesco had a long artistic association with Andrés Segovia going back to their meeting in 1932, and had written a great many guitar compositions with Segovia in mind. From the mid-1950s he also dedicated solo guitar pieces to guitarists such as Siegfried Behrend, Christopher Parkening, Oscar Ghiglia, Alirio Díaz, Laurindo Almeida and others. However, this work was both inspired by and dedicated to the husband-wife duo guitar team of Alexandre Lagoya and Ida Presti.

Castelnuovo-Tedesco wrote the work between 8 March and 3 June 1962.

Both the title and the structure of the work were inspired by Johann Sebastian Bach's The Well-Tempered Clavier, a double set of 48 preludes and fugues for keyboard in all 24 major and minor keys. Bach proceeded in ascending semitones starting at C major, following each major key with its parallel minor. Instead, Castelnuovo-Tedesco used a schema based on the circle of fifths - but not the same solution as used by Chopin in his 24 Preludes, Op. 28 and Shostakovich in his 24 Preludes and Fugues, Op. 87.

Castelnuovo-Tedesco's order for Books I and II was:

- G minor, D major, A minor, E major, B minor, F♯ major, C♯ minor, A♭ major, E♭ minor, B♭ major, F minor, C major

For Books III and IV, the major and minor tonalities were reversed:

- G major, D minor, A major, E minor, B major, F♯ minor, C♯ major, G♯ minor, E♭ major, B♭ minor, F major, C minor.

Presti died suddenly in April 1967, aged only 43. Castelnuovo-Tedesco paid tribute to her in a 25th prelude and fugue for two guitars, called Fuga Elegiaca – to the Memory of Ida Presti, which was written in G minor, a return to the starting key of Les Guitares bien tempérées.

Castelnuovo-Tedesco died in 1968. Les Guitares bien tempérées was not published until 1974, by Aldo Bruzzichella.

The work has been recorded by duos such as MoNo Guitar Duo, Duo Tedesco, Duo Favori, Brasil Guitar Duo, Duo Pace Poli Cappelli and Matteo Mela & Lorenzo Micheli.
