= Marie-Thérèse Fourneau =

French pianist (1924–2000)

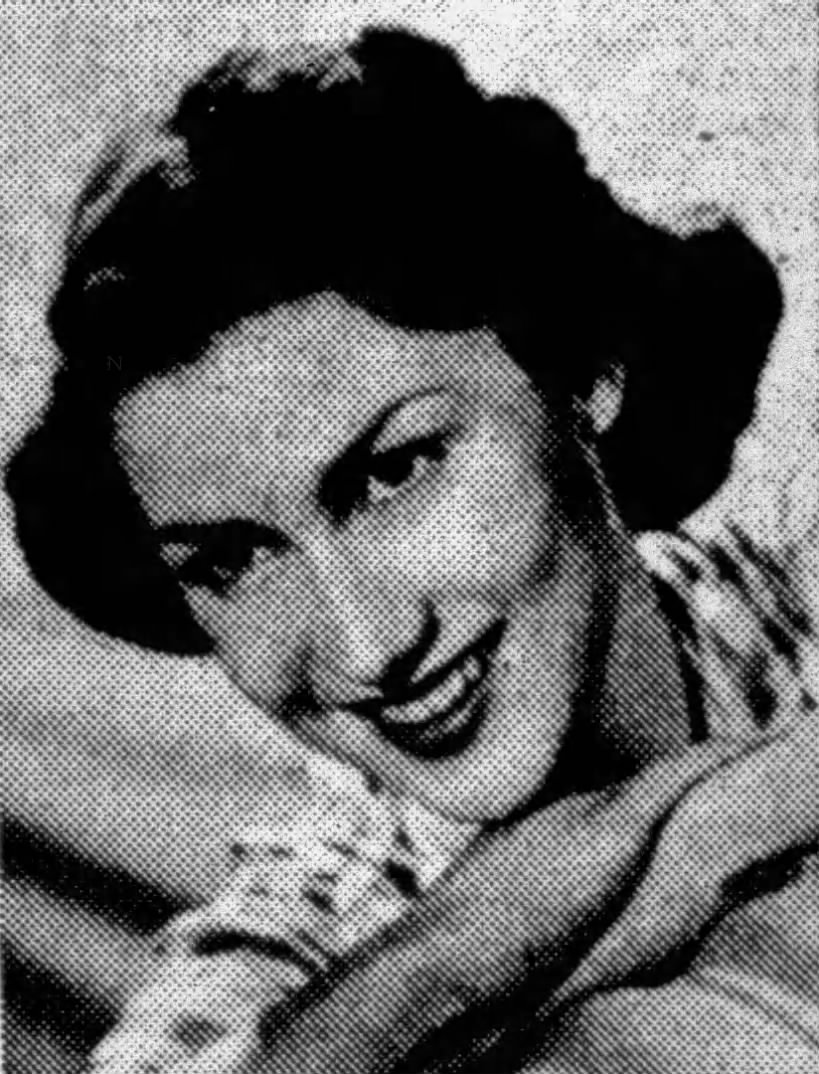
- Fourneau before 1946
- Born: Marie-Thérèse Fourneau; 9 April 1924; Saint-Mandé, France
- Died: 11 May 2000 (aged 76); Saint-Mandé, France
- Education: Conservatoire de Paris (Marguerite Long, Jean Doyen, Joseph Calvet)
- Occupations: classical pianist, piano teacher
- Known for: Exponent of the French piano school

Marie-Thérèse Fourneau (9 April 1924 – 11 May 2000) was a French classical pianist and educator. A prominent exponent of the French piano school, she studied under Marguerite Long at the Conservatoire de Paris, where she earned the Premier Prix diploma in 1942.

Fourneau’s recording career spanned from the 1940s to the 1970s, beginning with wartime sessions in occupied Paris for Columbia/EMI. She gained significant critical acclaim in 1947, receiving the Grand Prix du Disque for her interpretations of works by Claude Debussy, Gabriel Fauré, and Maurice Ravel.

After a neurological illness forced her retirement from the stage in the mid-1970s, she dedicated herself to teaching at the Montreuil Conservatory. Her recorded legacy has seen renewed interest in the 21st century through various digital remasterings and reissues.

== Life ==
Marie-Thérèse Fourneau was born on 9 April 1924 in Saint-Mandé near Paris, (Note: Music dictionaries list Fourneau's year of birth as 1924, see + +)}} France. She began her musical education at the Conservatoire de Paris. There she studied piano with Marguerite Long and Jean Doyen and chamber music with Joseph Calvet. After completing her studies with the Premier Prix diploma in 1942, Fourneau participated in the first Long-Thibaud Competition in Paris in November 1943. At this event, the jury, chaired by Henri Rabaud, hesitated to choose between her and Samson François. François was ultimately awarded first prize, and Fourneau, due to her more "stable and traditional playing" received an honourable mention. In 1946, she participated in a women's piano competition held during the first post-war International Music Competition in Geneva. She did not win a prize but received a medal. Music critics noted her "charming personality" and her "excellent technique and a keen musical sense."

Fourneau began recording during the Second World War in occupied Paris for Columbia/EMI Collaboration. She continued recording with various labels until 1975. Her artistry was recognised in 1947, when she received the Grand Prix du Disque for her recordings of Debussy, Fauré, and Ravel. Her concert career extended across France but also into neighbouring countries, the Netherlands, and South America. There, audiences and music critics especially acclaimed her interpretations of French composers. However, a neurological illness forced her withdrawal from the stage and recording studio in the mid-1970s. She continued "to teach and adjudicate piano students" at Montreuil Conservatory.

In the biography of her long-time friend, the cellist Pierre Fournier, Fourneau was described as a woman with an "independence of spirit" who prioritised both her young daughter and a "healthy world career."

Fourneau died on 11 May 2000 in a hospital in her hometown, Saint-Mandé.

== Reception ==
Fourneau was especially appreciated for her interpretations of French Romantic and Impressionist piano composers. Contemporaries admired her stylistic assurance, "subtle touch", and musical sensitivity during her career.

In 1954, it was noted after her London concert at Wigmore Hall that her Chopin had a "beautifully moulded melodic line." At the same time frame at the same place, only a few could "interpret Fauré and Chabrier so delightfully." In 1952, the Viennese music critic Philipp Ruff praised her style's elegance, "excellent in technique and gifted with a fine sense of sound ... far removed from any virtuoso dazzle", especially in her interpretation of French composers. Spanish-speaking critics noted how "wonderful are her interpretations of Debussy's music", and described her performances in Spain and Argentina as "sensitive, cultivated, serious, with nimble technique." In the mid-1950s, Fourneau was praised for playing "Cesar Franck’s Symphonic Variations with a precision that never sacrificed its graceful charm", and Denby Richards highlighted her "delicate playing" in the technically demanding Ravel Piano Concerto with the Royal Philharmonic Orchestra at the Festival Hall. Fourneau was called a "truly musical" pianist.

Le Monde music critic René Dumesnil saw Fourneau's impact on piano playing in her interpretative approach, which combined simplicity, sensitivity, and elegance. In an anthology of her recordings released up to 1960, French musicologist Armand Panigel commented favourably: "Marie-Thérèse Fourneau's talent is above all intimate." She has been characterised as one of the "most brilliant" students of the "Grande Dame of the French piano school", Marguerite Long, and continued her tradition of “restraint rather than excess”. A French pianism "of clarity, of discreet and elegant expression, ... the school of the fingers, where the most absolute precision serves the most delicate sensibility", as Long explained in her work Le Piano.

== Recordings and film ==
Fourneau recorded for Columbia/EMI between 1944 and 1957 and for the French Pacific label in 1957 and 1960, focusing on works of Chopin, Debussy, Ravel, and Fauré.

In 2023, Fourneau was honoured through a collaboration between the French Institut national de l'audiovisuel and the Korean label Spectrum Sounds, resulting in the release of Hommage à Marie-Thérèse Fourneau. It features previously unreleased radio transmissions of Debussy, Chopin, Mozart, and Schumann from 1960 to 1975. In 2018, the Japanese label Sakuraphon remastered all her 78 rpm recordings for Columbia/EMI and released the compilation Marie-Thérèse Fourneau. In 2012, Naxos had already released her interpretation of Fauré's Barcarolle No. 1, "recorded in wartime Paris in" 1944, in their publication Women at the Piano – An Anthology of Historic Performances, Vol. 4 (1921–1955). Previously, the French label Forgotten Records reissued historical recordings, including Fourneau's collaborations with violinist Michèle Auclair.

French television broadcast the third episode of French film director Santelli's six-part series Marguerite Long et nous (Marguerite Long and we) on 15 April 1966. Fourneau performed works by Fauré in this 26-minute film in the presence of Marguerite Long. The 1963 French film Le Troisième Concerto (The third concert) is occasionally underscored by Fourneau's recordings.
