= Pietro Castelnuovo-Tedesco =

American psychiatrist (1925–1998)

Pietro Castelnuovo-Tedesco (January 5, 1925 – January 24, 1998) was an American psychiatrist. He was the Blakemore Professor of Psychiatry at Vanderbilt University. Castelnuovo-Tedesco was born in Florence, Italy, the son of composer Mario Castelnuovo-Tedesco. His family, which was Jewish, came to California in 1939. He earned undergraduate degrees from the University of California and his medical degree from Boston University. During the Second World War, he served as a captain with the Air Force Medical Corps.

He was a training psychoanalyst with the St Louis Psychoanalytic Institute and author of The Twenty Minute Hour and other written works. His research and clinical interests included psychosomatic aspects of patient care as well as teaching psychiatric principles and psychotherapy to non-psychiatrists.
