= Olivier Chassain =

French classical guitarist

Olivier Chassain is a French classical guitarist.

After learning the guitar with Roger Généraux, Chassain completed his training with Carel Harms.

He entered the Conservatoire de Paris in 1977 in Alexandre Lagoya's class, and in 1982 won the First Prizes for guitar, harmony and counterpoint. In 1988 he was the first non-American guitarist to receive the First Prize of the Guitar Foundation of America International Competition. Since then, he has given concerts in Europe, Asia, Africa, Canada and the United States, to which he returns regularly.

A Professor at the conservatories of Orléans (1978-1991) and Bordeaux (since 1991), Chassain succeeded Alexandre Lagoya in 1994 to the guitar class of the CNSMDP. He also gives master classes.

He has composed a number of music scores for guitar alone or with various instruments (Arion, Étoiles, De loin en loin), as well as chamber music works and pieces of an educational nature (Patchwork, Histoire de trains, Orléans memories, Mas Doumy's Circus). He premiered a work by composer Karol Beffa.

Chassain was a member of the 2004 edition of the Michele Pittaluga International Classical Guitar Competition jury.

== Records ==
- Œuvres pour guitare, Olivier Chassain, Frémeaux & Associés, CD album; 06/2002
- Éventail - Les maîtres de la guitare espagnole, Isaac Albeniz Joaquin Rodrigo, Heitor Villa-Lobos; Olivier Chassain, Métronome; CD album; 01/1999
- Almost a song - Tentos 3 - Preludios epigrammaticos... Hans Werner Henze, Leo Brouwer, Olivier Chassain; Métronome; CD album; 07/1998
- Concerti for two mandolins, for two trumpets, Antonio Vivaldi, Jean-Louis Beaumadier, Follia (ensemble Instrumental La)
