= Sylvie Hue =

Sylvie Hue is a French classical clarinetist.

== Biography ==
After having pursued musical and literary studies at the Paris 12 Val de Marne University and at the Conservatoire de Paris, this student of Guy Deplus and Christian Lardé obtained a First prize for clarinet unanimously in 1987 and a first prize for chamber music in 1988.

First prize at the Tokyo International Competition in 1988, laureate of the Prague International Competition in 1991, she became the first soloist with the Garde républicaine of Paris orchestra. She performs in recital and with orchestra in France and around the world, especially in Japan. With pianist Frédérique Lagarde, she also plays regularly as a duo and is at the origin of the "Trio Paronyme".

Many renowned composer, including Pierre Ancelin, Roger Boutry, Graciane Finzi and Armando Ghidoni, have dedicated concertante and chamber music works to her.

== Selected discography ==
- La clarinette de la Belle Époque, vol. I & Il -, piano: Roger Boutry, REM (Polygram) 311209 XCD/ 311295 XCD
- Carl Maria von Weber's Concerto n° 1, Orchestre d'harmonie de la Force Aérienne Belge, Robert Martin publisher RM 08956 IL 660
- Armando Ghidoni's Concerto pour clarinette et orchestre à cordes, Éditions Pizzicato Pizz 04
- Breeze on the sea (British repertoire for clarinet and piano), piano: Roger Boutry, Édition Syrius (Coda) Syr 141349
- Contre-Chant, duo with Frédérique Lagarde (piano), works by Francis Poulenc, Jacques Castérède, Roger Boutry, Nicolas Bacri and Pierre Sancan, Le Chant de Linos, CL 0939

== Bibliography ==
- L'Apprenti clarinettiste vol. 1 and 2 – Éditions Combre, 1995 OCLC 717620241
- 150 ans de musique à la Garde républicaine, La Nouvelle Arche de Noé, 1998 ISBN 9782843680977
- 18 études ethniques, Editions Combre, 2004
