= David Blumberg =

Israeli banker

- דוד בלומברג
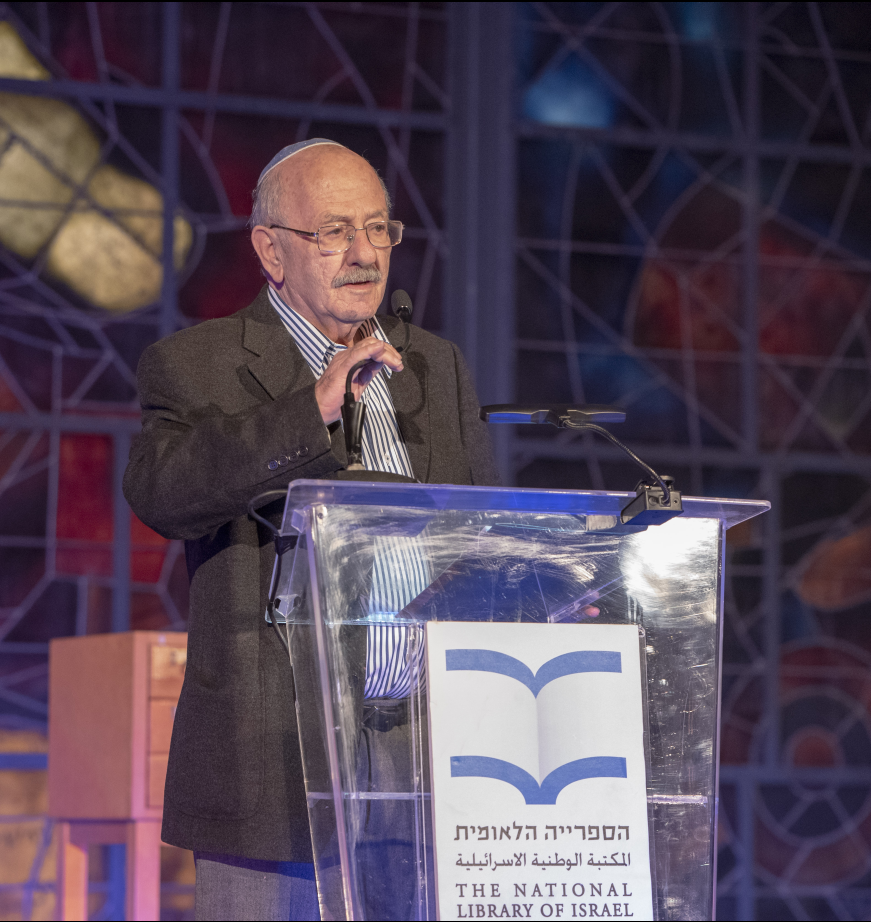
- David Blumberg at the National Library of Israel
- Born: 12 September 1944; Haifa, Israel
- Died: 31 August 2025 (aged 80)
- Known for: Chairman of the National Library of Israel
- Honors: Lit torch at Israel's 67th national Independence Day ceremony; Yakir Yerushalayim (Distinguished Citizen of Jerusalem) Prize, 2017

David Blumberg (Hebrew: דוד בלומברג; born 12 September 1944 died 31 August 2025) was a senior banker and public figure active in promoting culture and education in Israel. From 2007 to 2022, he was the chairman of the National Library of Israel. He previously w as chairman of the Bank of Jerusalem, CEO of United Mizrahi Bank, and CEO of Tefahot Israel Mortgage Bank.

== Biography ==
Born to Tova and Meir Blumberg in Haifa, Blumberg is married and a father to three children. He lives in Jerusalem. He received a BA in Economics and Political Science and an MBA from The Hebrew University of Jerusalem.

== Leading the National Library of Israel renewal ==
From 2007 to 2022, Blumberg was the director of the National Library of Israel board of directors. In this capacity he led the National Library's comprehensive renewal process, which is being driven by the changing values, challenges, needs and technological developments of the 21st century. The process aimed to transform the National Library into a leading cultural and educational center for all of Israel's citizens, the international Jewish community, and diverse audiences worldwide. The process culminated with the completion and opening of the new National Library campus in Jerusalem's National District.

Blumberg signed the National Library of Israel Charter at a ceremony attended by Israel's heads of state. He also laid the cornerstone for the new National Library of Israel building adjacent to the Knesset.

== Professional career ==
From 1971 to 1981, Blumberg worked in various positions at the Bank of Israel, including as deputy foreign trade supervisor and deputy director of the Credit Department.

From 1981 to 1995, Blumberg held several senior positions at United Mizrahi Bank, the fourth largest bank in Israel. From 1988 to 1993 he was CEO of Tefahot Israel Mortgage Bank, the largest mortgage bank in Israel at that time. From 1993 to 1995, he was CEO of United Mizrahi Bank. From 1995 to 1998 he was deputy chairman of the Bank of Jerusalem board of directors and from 1998 to 2006 as chairman of its board of directors. Blumberg also was a member of the Bank of Israel's Banking Advisory Committee.

Blumberg also was a consultant and representative of foreign banks in Israel. From 1997 to 2000, he was senior advisor to ANZ Bank for regional activities (Israel, the Palestinian Authority, and Jordan). From 2006 to 2008 he was the Israeli representative of Eurohypo, the largest real estate bank in Europe.

He previously was a director of a number of publicly traded companies, including Osem, Bezeq, Africa Israel Investments, Mer Group, U-Bank, and EMI (Mortage Insurance).

From 1999 to 2002, he was arbitrator in a dispute between the State of Israel, the Organization of Post-Primary School Teachers and the Teachers' Union (ארגון_המורים); and from 2006 to 2008 he chaired the arbitration team in a dispute between the State of Israel, Hadassah, the Women's Zionist Organization of America and the Israeli Medical Association.

Since 2008 he has been chairman of the board of directors of the Israeli Credit Insurance Company (ICIC).

== Public service ==
Blumberg is active in philanthropic, cultural, educational, and public affairs. He was on the Board of Governors of the Hebrew University of Jerusalem and of the Open University of Israel, on the Management Committee of the Jerusalem Institute for Policy Research, and as a public representative in the National Labor Court in Israel.

=== The Adi Foundation ===
In 2002 Blumberg established the Adi Foundation in memory of his late daughter Adi Dermer (née Blumberg). The Foundation promotes and nurtures artistic work that examines the relationship between art and Judaism, and endeavors to combine Jewish values with design and artistic expression. The Foundation's central project is a biennial international competition in visual arts and design. The winner of the competition is awarded The Adi Prize for Jewish Expression in Art and Design, as well as a monetary prize. The Adi Foundation also organizes conferences and workshops as well as competition catalogues organized around a central theme.

== Awards and recognition ==
- In recognition of his work with the National Library and the Adi Foundation, in 2013 Blumberg was chosen to light a torch at Israel's 65th national Independence Day ceremony (טקס_הדלקת_המשואות) on Mount Herzl.
- In 2017, he received the Yakir Yerushalayim (Honorary Citizen of Jerusalem) Prize.
