= Mario Castelnuovo-Tedesco =

Italian-Jewish composer (1895–1968)

- Born: April 3, 1895; Florence, Italy
- Died: March 16, 1968 (aged 72); Beverly Hills, California, United States
- Resting place: Westwood Village Memorial Park Cemetery
- Citizenship: Italian, American
- Education: Florence Conservatory
- Occupations: Composer, pianist, writer
- Years active: c. 1904–1968
- Era: 20th century
- Employer: Metro-Goldwyn-Mayer
- Known for: Guitar compositions, film music, literary-inspired concerts
- Notable work: The Mandrake, Guitar Concerto No. 1, Violin Concerto No. 2, Les Guitares bien tempérées, The Merchant of Venice
- Style: Neoclassical, literary and programmatic compositions
- Movement: Contemporary classical music
- Children: Pietro Castelnuovo-Tedesco, Lorenzo Castelnuovo-Tedesco
- Parent(s): Amadeo Castelnuovo-Tedesco, Guido Castelnuovo-Tedesco
- Awards: Concorso Campari
- Website: mariocastelnuovotedesco.com

Mario Castelnuovo-Tedesco (3 April 1895 – 16 March 1968) was an Italian composer, pianist and writer. He was known as one of the foremost guitar composers in the twentieth century with almost one hundred compositions for that instrument. In 1939 he emigrated to the United States and became a film composer for Metro-Goldwyn-Mayer for some 200 Hollywood movies for the next fifteen years. He also wrote concertos for Jascha Heifetz and Gregor Piatigorsky.

== Biography ==
Born in Florence, he was descended from a prominent banking family that had lived in Tuscany, specifically in Siena, until the latter half of the 19th century. His father was Amedeo and his elder brothers Ugo (born in 1890, lawyer) and Guido (born in 1891, engineer). Castelnuovo-Tedesco was first introduced to the piano by his mother, Noemi Senigaglia, and he composed his first pieces when he was just nine years old. After completing a degree in piano in 1914 under Edgardo Del Valle de Paz (1861–1920), well-known composer and pianist pupil of Beniamino Cesi, he began studying composition under renowned Italian composer Ildebrando Pizzetti, and received a diploma in composition in 1918. He soon came to the attention of composer and pianist Alfredo Casella, who included the young Castelnuovo-Tedesco's work in his repertoire. Casella also ensured that Castelnuovo's works would be included in the repertoires of the Società Italiana di Musica Moderna (later the Corporazione delle Nuove Musiche), granting him exposure throughout Europe as one of Italy's up-and-coming young composers. Works by him were included in the first festival of the International Society of Contemporary Music, held in Salzburg, Austria, in 1922.

In 1926, Castelnuovo-Tedesco premiered his first opera La Mandragola, based on a play by Niccolò Machiavelli. It was the first of his many works inspired by great literature, and which included interpretations of works by Aeschylus, Virgil, John Keats, William Wordsworth, Walt Whitman, Miguel de Cervantes, Federico García Lorca, and especially William Shakespeare. Another major source of inspiration for him was his Jewish heritage, most notably the Bible and Jewish liturgy. His Violin Concerto No. 2 (1931), written at the request of Jascha Heifetz, was also an expression of his pride in his Jewish origins, or as he described it, the "splendor of past days", in the face of rising anti-Semitism that was sweeping across much of Europe.

At the 1932 festival of the International Society of Contemporary Music, held in Venice, Castelnuovo-Tedesco first met the Spanish guitarist Andrés Segovia. The meeting inspired Castelnuovo-Tedesco to write for the guitar, beginning with his Variazioni attraverso i secoli (Variations à travers les siècles) (Variations through the ages), Op. 71 (1932), and later his Guitar Concerto No. 1 (1939). All in all, he wrote almost one hundred compositions for this instrument, which earned him a reputation as one of the foremost composers for the guitar in the twentieth century. Some of them were written and dedicated to Segovia, who was an enthusiast of his style (Segovia called him an "incorruptible servant of artistic truth").

Even before the Italian government promulgated the Italian racial laws in late 1938, Castelnuovo-Tedesco was banned from the radio and performances of his work were cancelled. The new racial laws, however, convinced him that he should leave Italy. He wrote to Arturo Toscanini, the former musical director of La Scala, and violinist Jascha Heifetz, explaining his plight, and both responded with support. As an American citizen, Heifetz began paperwork to sponsor Castelnuovo-Tedesco as an immigrant in the United States. Castelnuovo-Tedesco left Italy in 1939, shortly before the outbreak of World War II, and settled in Larchmont, Westchester County, New York.

He wrote his Cello Concerto in G minor, Op. 72, for Gregor Piatigorsky. It was premiered with the dedicatee under Arturo Toscanini in New York in 1935. For Piatigorsky he also wrote a Toccata (1935), and a piece called Greeting Card, Op. 170/3, based on the spelling of Piatigorsky's name.

Like many artists who fled fascism, Castelnuovo-Tedesco ended up in Hollywood, where, with the help of Jascha Heifetz, he landed a contract with Metro-Goldwyn-Mayer as a film composer. Over the next fifteen years, he worked on scores for some 200 films there and at the other major film studios. Rita Hayworth hired him to write the music for The Loves of Carmen (1948), produced by Hayworth for her Beckworth Productions and released by Columbia Pictures.

As a teacher, Castelnuovo-Tedesco had a significant influence on other major film composers, including Henry Mancini, Nelson Riddle, Herman Stein and André Previn. Jerry Goldsmith, Marty Paich and John Williams were all his pupils, as was Scott Bradley, who studied privately with him while both were on staff at MGM. He also maintained close contact with composer Robert Strassburg. His relationship to Hollywood was ambiguous: later in life he downplayed the influence that it had on his own work, but he also believed that it was an essentially American artform, much as opera was European.

In 1946 he became a U.S. citizen, but he remained very close to Italy, which he frequently visited. In 1958 he won the Concorso Campari with the opera The Merchant of Venice, which was first performed in 1961 at the Maggio Musicale Fiorentino under the baton of Gianandrea Gavazzeni.

In 1962 he wrote Les Guitares bien tempérées ("The Well-Tempered Guitars") for two guitars, a set of 24 preludes and fugues in all 24 major and minor keys, for the duo-guitarists Alexandre Lagoya and Ida Presti. This was inspired by The Well-Tempered Clavier by Johann Sebastian Bach, a composer Castelnuovo-Tedesco revered.

In the United States, Castelnuovo-Tedesco also composed new operas and works based on American poetry, Jewish liturgy, and the Bible. He died in Beverly Hills, California, in 1968 at the age of 72. He is buried at Westwood Village Memorial Park Cemetery.

The Library of Congress in Washington, DC, hosts the Mario Castelnuovo-Tedesco Collection, a collection of the composer's manuscripts donated by his family in 2000. The catalogue is accessible online.

His oldest son was the psychiatrist Pietro Castelnuovo-Tedesco. His younger son was the architect Lorenzo Castelnuovo-Tedesco of Los Angeles.

== Works ==
Castelnuovo-Tedesco's autobiography, A life in music: a book of memories, written shortly before his death, was published decades later:

- Una vita di musica: un libro di ricordi (in Italian), James Westby (ed.), with an introduction by Mila De Sanctis, Fiesole: Cadmo, 2005. ISBN 978-88-7923-195-4

Other writings by the composer have been catalogued.

In 2018 a collection of contemporary guitar music in homage to Castelnuovo-Tedesco was published, edited by Piero Bonaguri. It includes works by composers Filippo Ferruggiara, Daniele Mandonico, Marco Reghezza, Marco Simoni, Alessandro Spazzoli, and Paolo Ugoletti.

In 2018, a film was released about his life entitled The Maestro, in which he was portrayed by actor Xander Berkeley. The film was well received and won the Audience Award at the Tallgrass Film Festival the Jury Award at the Borrego Springs Film Festival in 2019, and the Youth Film Award at the Rhode Island International Film Festival in 2018. Xander Berkeley also received "Best Actor" awards at the 2017 Oaxaca Film Festival and the 2018 Albuquerque Film & Music Experience.

== Sources and further reading ==
- Bardi, Aloma (2012). "Mario Castelnuovo-Tedesco amico dei musicisti napoletani". In Pier Paolo De Martino and Daniela Margoni Tortora (ed.). Musica e musicisti a Napoli nel primo Novecento (in Italian). Napoli: Istituto Italiano per gli Studi Filosofici.
- Bardi, Aloma, ed.(2015). "European and American Horizons of Mario Castelnuovo-Tedesco:The Leaves of Grass and Shakespeare Sonnets. Essays from the International Center for American Music (ICAMUS) events, Florence, June 2015". Ann Arbor: ICAMUS, 2015.
- Champagne, John (2012). "A Glimpse through an Interstice Caught": fascism and Mario Castelnuovo-Tedesco's "Calamus" Songs. Aesthetic Modernism and Masculinity in Fascist Italy. New York: Routledge.
- Compagno, Alberto (2000). Gli anni fiorentini di Mario Castelnuovo-Tedesco (in Italian). Carrara.
- Gatti, Guido M. "Ricordo di Mario Castelnuovo Tedesco". In Annuario Accademia Nazionale di S. Cecilia (in Italian), 1969.
- Gilardino, Angelo. "Mario Castelnuovo-Tedesco". Supplement of Guitar (in Italian) 2005, no. 10.
- Gilardino, Angelo (2018). Mario Castelnuovo-Tedesco : un Fiorentino a Beverly Hills. Milano: Edizioni Curci. ISBN 978-88-6395-246-9. OCLC 1030816092.
- Malorgio, Cosimo (2001). Censure di un musicista: la vicenda artistica e umana di Mario Castelnuovo-Tedesco. Torino: Paravia (vol. 6), 2001. ISBN 978-88-395-6253-1
- Orselli, Cesare (1978). "Castelnuovo-Tedesco, Mario". Dizionario Biografico degli Italiani (in Italian). Treccani. Retrieved 20 September 2013.
- Otero, Corazon (1987) Mario Castelnuovo-Tedesco: su vida y su obra para guitarra(in Spanish). Lomas de Bezares: Ediciones musicales Yolotl. ISBN 978-968-6226-00-3
- Rossi, Nick (1977). Catalogue of Works by Mario Castelnuovo-Tedesco. New York: International Castelnuovo-Tedesco Society.
- Westby, James. CastelnuovoTedesco in America: The Film Music. PhD Dissertation, University of California at Los Angeles, 1994.
- Westby, James (2005). Catalogo delle opere: composizioni, bibliografia, filmografia (in Italian). Fiesole: Cadmo.
- Westby, James. "Castelnuovo-Tedesco, Mario". Grove Music Online. Oxford Music Online, Oxford University Press. Retrieved 18 September 2013 (subscription required).
