= Pierre Wissmer =

French composer (1915–1992)

- Born: 30 October 1915; Geneva
- Died: 4 November 1992 (aged 77); Valcros (Var)
- Occupation: Composer
- Spouse: Laure-Anne Étienne

Pierre Wissmer (30 October 1915 – 4 November 1992) was a 20th-century French classical composer of Swiss origin.

== Biography ==
Formed at the Conservatoire de Musique de Genève, he received the advice of Robert Casadesus before perfecting his mastery of counterpoint at the Schola Cantorum de Paris with Daniel-Lesur. He also followed the course of conducting of Charles Münch at the École normale de musique de Paris.

His first piano concerto was created on the radio by Jacqueline Blancard 10 October 1937 under the direction of Henri Tomasi. In 1938, his first symphony was directed in Winterthur by Hermann Scherchen.

In 1939, Pierre Wissmer composed Le beau dimanche, one-act ballet on an argument by Pierre Guérin who put him in touch with Stravinski, Poulenc, Sauguet, and Cocteau. In 1944, he was appointed professor of composition at Conservatoire de Genève and head of the Department of chamber music at Radio Geneva.

In 1948, he married the pianist Laure-Anne Étienne, a student of Marguerite Long at Conservatoire de Paris. From 1952 to 1957, he was deputy director of programs at Radio Luxembourg and, from 1957, director of the Schola Cantorum. In 1958 he adopted French citizenship and later was appointed director of the École normale de musique of Le Mans (1969–1981).

In 1967, he was awarded the Grand Prix musical of the city of Paris.

In 1992, he died in Valcros, at age 77 shortly after his wife.

== Works ==
=== Incidental music ===
- 1945: Marion ou la Belle au Tricorne, radio opera (Geneva, Radio Suisse Romande, 16 April 1947)
- 1952: Capitaine Bruno, opéra comique (Geneva, 9 November)
- 1958: Léonidas ou la Cruauté mentale, opéra bouffe (Paris, 12 September)
- 1939: Le Beau Dimanche, ballet (Geneva, 20 March 1944)
- 1963: Alerte, puits, ballet (Geneva, 1964)
- 1967: Christina et les chimères, ballet (French Television, 7 December 1972)

=== Orchestral music ===
- 9 Symphonies (1938, 1951, 1955, 1962, 1969, 1977, 1983/84, 1986, 1988/89)
- 3 piano concertos (1937, 1948, 1971)
- 3 violin concertos (1942, 1954, 1987)
- 1937: Mouvement, for string orchestra (Geneva, 25 February 1938)
- 1938: Divertissement sur un choral for 11 instruments (Geneva, 8 December 1939)
- 1943: Antoine et Cléopâtre, suite symphonique (Geneva, 2 October 1946)
- 1952: Mandrellina, overture (Geneva, 16 April 1952)
- 1957: Concerto for guitar
- 1960: Concerto for clarinet
- 1961: Concerto for trumpet
- 1963: Concerto for oboe
- 1966: Concerto valcrosiano
- 1966: Concertino-Croisière for flute, string orchestra and piano
- 1972: Triptyque romand
- 1974: Dialogue for bassoon (or cello) and orchestra
- 1982: Symphonietta concertante, for flute, harp and orchestra

=== Chamber music ===
- 3 String quartets (1937, 1949, 1972)
- 1938: Sérénade for oboe, clarinet and bassoon
- 1941: Sonatine for clarinet and piano
- 1946: Sonatine for violon and piano
- 1949: Sonate for piano
- 1956: Quartet for saxophones
- 1961: Quadrige for flute, violin, cello and piano
- 1962: Sonate for flute and guitar
- 1964: Quintette à vent
- 1973: “Réflexions” for organ
- 1975: Variations sur un Noël imaginaire for organ (also for orchestra, 1975)
- 1978: Trio adelfiano, for flute, cello and piano

=== Vocal music ===
- 1942: Naïades pour récitant, soloists, choir and orchestra (Geneva, 21 January)
- 1962: Hérétique et relapse, one-act mystery
- 1965: Le Quatrième Mage, oratorio (Paris, 14 October 1969)
- 1971: Cantique en l'ounour dou grand saintlouis, rei de franco et patroun de vaucros de cuers, pour choir with piano or organ
- 1951: Chants de Mars: 7 chœurs a cappella pour 3 voix d'enfants sur des poésies de René de Obaldia.(Paris 1951)

== Selected discography ==
Pierre Wissmer left a work that is both abundant and diverse with respect to both instrumental music, chamber music, concert music and music for symphonic orchestra, vocal or choral music, opera or musical theatre, incidental music, ballets, music for radio or television and film score.

- Trio adelfiano for flute, cello and piano/Quadrige for flute, violin, cello and piano, with Geneviève Ibanez (piano), Anne Werner-Fuchs (violin), Frédéric Werner (flute), Jean Barthe and Alex Descharnes (cellos), CD, Marcal Classics, MA 060201
- Chanson de l'Orpailler. Complete works for and with guitar. With Philippe Rayer and Michel Guzard (guitares), CD, Quantum, QM 7016
- Askok for guitar and recorder. With Patric Ruby (guitar) and Robin Troman (recorder), CD, Quantum, QM 7031
- Trois silhouettes. With Mireille Saumal (piano). CD, Marcal, MA 040302

== Bibliography ==
- Baker, Theodore; Slonimsky, Nicolas (1995). Baker's Biographical Dictionary of Musicians. Bouquins (in French). Vol. 3. Translated by Marie-Stella Pâris. Paris: Robert Laffont. p. 4620. ISBN 2-221-07778-4.
