= Jacques Castérède =

French composer and pianist (1926–2014)

Jacques Castérède (10 April 1926 – 6 April 2014) was a French composer and pianist.

== Life ==
Born in Paris, Castérède studied at Lycée Buffon. He earned his baccalauréat in elementary mathematics, then entered the Paris Conservatory in 1944 and began studying piano under Armand Ferté, composition under Tony Aubin, and analysis under Olivier Messiaen. While at the Conservatory, between 1948 and 1953 he received five first prizes (in piano, chamber music, analysis, composition, and harmony). He also won the Grand Prix de Rome in 1953 with his cantata La Boîte de Pandore (Pandora's Box). The following year, he went to Rome, where he stayed at the Villa Medici until 1958.

In 1960, he was appointed professor of solfège in the Paris Conservatory, then counsellor of piano studies (Conseilleur aux Études) in 1966, and analysis in 1971. In addition, he taught composition at the École Normale from 1983 to 1988, and analysis from 1988 to 1998. On an invitation from the Chinese government, he became a professor of composition at the Central Academy in Beijing. He received numerous awards as a composer, among them the Paris Civil Award in 1991, the Charles Cros Award, and the Record Academy Award in 1995. His many works, which include symphonies, concertos, ballets, and ensemble and chamber music, have been performed throughout France, Germany, and Italy as well as in the United States and Canada.

His music is essentially melodic, often using modal scales over rich and varied structures.

== Main works ==
=== Stage ===
- Chamber opera La Cour des miracles (1954) {sop, msp, alto, btn, orch}
- Oratorio Le Livre de Job (1958) {recit, tnr, btn, bss, choir, orch}
- Ballet Basketball (1959) {hrp, p, perc, orch}
- Ballet But (1959)

=== Orchestral ===
- 1ère Symphonie pour cordes (1952) {strings}
- La Folle nuit de n'importe ou (1955) {orch, clvcn, hrp, perc}
- La Grande peur (1955) {martenot, 2p, child-choir, sop, fl, orch}
- Cinq Danses symphoniques (1956) {orch, p, hrp}
- Musique pour un conte d'Edgar Allan Poe (1957) {hrp, clsta, xylo, vib, p, recit, orch}
- Suite en trois mouvements à la mémoire d'Honegger (1957)
- La Déscente de croix de Rubens (1958)
- Le Fil d'Ariane (1959), orchestra
- Symphonie No. 2 (1960)
- Prélude et fugue (1960) {strings}
- Pamplemousse (1962)
- Sophie-Dorothée (1962)
- Promenade printaniere (1963)
- Divertissement d'été (1965) {p, hrp, brass, choir, perc?}

=== Concertante works ===
- Concerto No. 1 pour piano et orchestre à cordes (1954) {p, strings}
- Concertino (1958) {tp, tb, p, perc, strings}
- Concerto No. 2 pour piano et orchestre (1970) {p, orch}
- Concerto pour guitare et orchestre (1973) {g, orch}
- Trois paysages d'automne (1982) {vc, strings}
- 2ème Concerto pour guitare et orchestre (1988) {g, orch}

=== Chamber ===
- Intermezzo (1953) {ob, p}
- Pastorale (1953) {as, p}
- Scherzo (1953) {as, p}
- Wind Quintet (1953) {fl, ob, cl, hrn, bssn}
- Sonatine pour trompette et piano (1953) {tp, p}
- Suite mythologique (1954) {3martenot, p}
- Sonate pour violon et piano (1955) {vln, p}
- Sonate en forme de suite (1955) {fl, p}
- Sonate pour clarinet et piano (1956) {cl, p}
- Sonate pour haubois et piano (1957) {ob, p}
- Sonatine for Trombone and Piano (1957) {tb, p}
- Prélude et danse (1959) {3tb, tba, p, perc}
- Fantaisie concertante (1960) {b-tb¡¡(tba), p}
- Musique for flute, string trio and harp (1960)
- Capriccio for violin and piano (1961)
- La Fileuse for bassoon and piano (1961)
- Douze Études for flute (1961)
- Flûtes en vacances for 3 or 4 flutes (1964)
- Ondes for ondes Martenot, piano and percussion (1962)
- Sonatina for tuba and piano (1963)
- Interférences for piano and percussion (1963)
- Ténèbres for reciter, piano and 3 percussionists (1963)
- Six Pièces brèves en duo for 2 trumpets (1965)
- Sonata for viola and piano (1968)
- Arithmophonie for 4 percussionists (1974)
- Avant que l'aube ne vienne for string quartet and piano (1975)
- Ciels for flute and piano (1980)
- 5 Bagatelles for four flutes (1980)
- Sonatine d'avril for flute and guitar (1985)
- Trois Visions de l'Apocalypse for brass septet and organ (1986)
- Les Heures calmes, 3 Pieces for 1, 2 and 3 violas (1987)
- Trois Moments musicaux d'après Corot for flute, clarinet, violin, cello and piano (1987)
- Pro tempore passionis for string quartet (1988)
- Quartettsatz for string quartet (1989)
- Sonatine de mai for flute and harp (2001)
- Hommage aux Pink Floyd for guitar

=== Piano ===
- Passacaille et fugue (1953)
- Suite à danser (1953) {2p (diverse inst)}
- Quatre Études (1957)
- Variations (1960)
- Diagrammes (1961)
- Feux croises (1963) {2p}
- Sonata pour piano (1967)
- Toccata
- Pianologie (1977)
- Hommage à Thelonious Monk (1983)
- La Course du soleil (1992)
- Pour un tombeau de Frédéric Chopin (1992)

=== Songs ===
- Trois Mélodies sur des poèmes de Paul Fort (1951)
- Trois fanfares pour la proclamation de Napoleon (1952) {recit, chamber (11brass), timp, perc}
- La Chanson du mal-aime (1960) {recit, btn, 4f-vo, chamber}
- L'Autre bout du monde, cantate instrumentale (1960)
- Quatre poèmes de Robert Desnos (1965) {btn, p}
- Liturgies de la vie et de la mort (1980) {3vo, choir, strings, perc}
- Jusqu'à mon dernier souffle (1986) {narr, choir, brass, perc}
- Psaume VIII (1987) {sop, vc, org}
- Cantique de la création (1994) {2vo, brass, strings, org, perc}
- Dans les abîmes de l'absence (1996) {btn, p}
- Mon père je m'abandonné à toi (1997) {4vo}
