= Roger Boutry =

French composer and conductor (1932–2019)

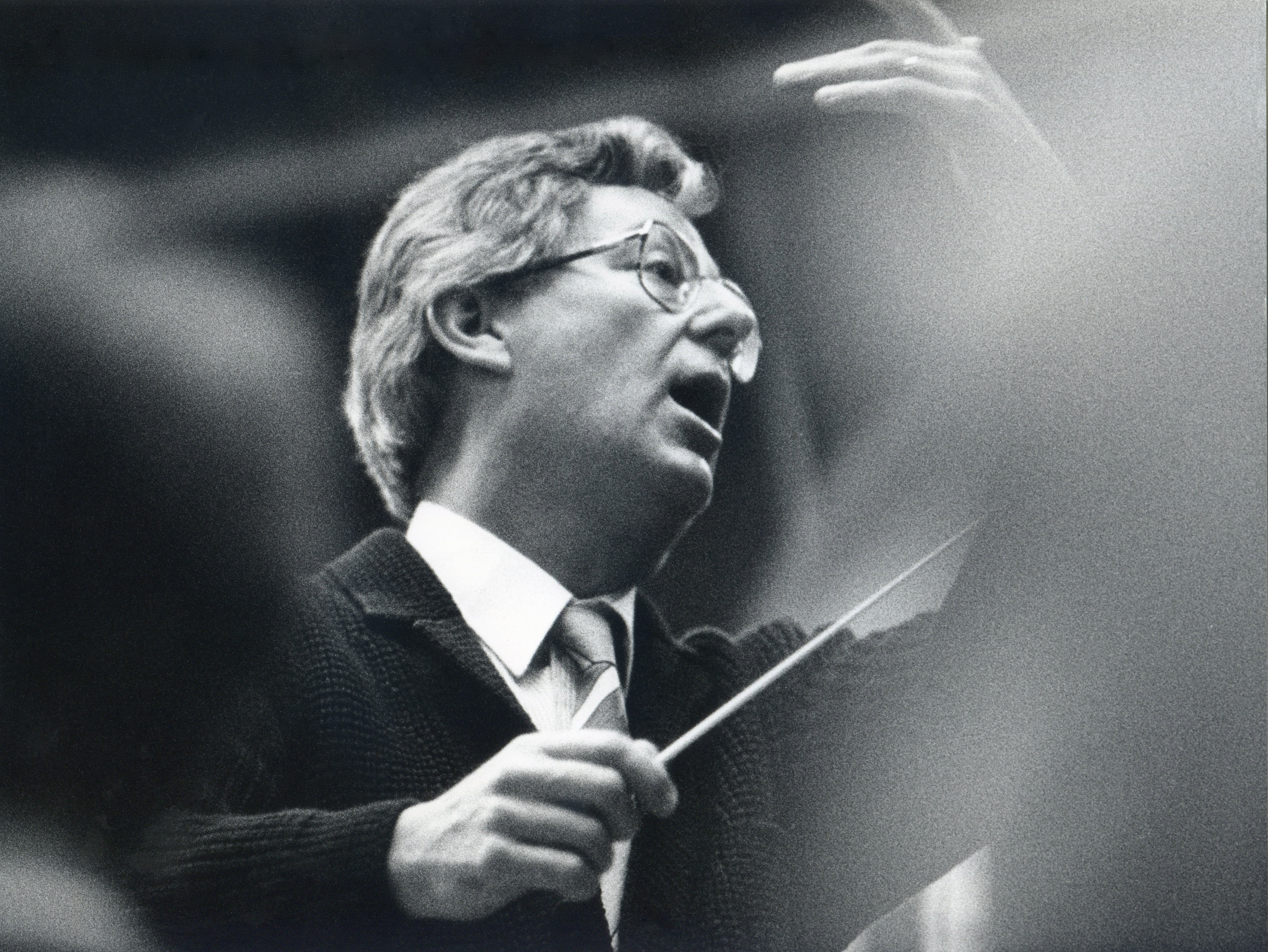
Roger Boutry

Roger Jean Boutry (27 February 1932 – 7 September 2019) was a French composer and conductor.

== Biography ==
Born in the 10th arrondissement of Paris, Boutry was a pianist, conductor, arranger, and accomplished composer. Born to musician parents, native of Cambrai, his mother was a pianist and singer and father a solo trombone at the Orchestre National de France of which he was one of the founders with Ingelbrecht). While continuing his secondary studies at Lycée Chaptal, he was admitted in 1944 to the Conservatoire de Paris where he won several first prizes: solfege in 1944 (Lucette Descaves's class), piano: 1st appointed in 1948 (Jean Doyen's class), harmony in 1949 (Henri Challan's class), chamber music in 1949 (P. Pasquien's class), piano accompaniment in 1950 (Nadia Boulanger's class), fugue and counterpoint in 1951 (Noël Gallon's class), conducting: 1st appointed in 1953 (Louis Fourestier's class), composition in 1954 (Tony Aubin's class), Grand prix de Rome in 1954 and finalist at the International Tchaikovsky Competition in Moscow in 1958.

On his return from the Villa Médicis, he did his military service first in Grenoble with the 6th Battalion of the Alpine Chasseurs and then during two years in Grande Kabylie. On his return from Algeria in 1962, he began an international concert career in the USA, USSR, Australia, Japan... and played under the direction of the most eminent conductors: André Cluytens, Pierre Dervaux, Ingelbrecht, Jean Martinon, Pierre Monteux... As a conductor, he began his career with the Opéra de Monte-Carlo Orchestra, then conducted the orchestras of the Brussels R.A.T.B., the Rome R.A.I., the Concerts Colonne, Orchestre Lamoureux, Pasdeloup Orchestra. Appointed a professor at the Conservatoire, he taught harmony from 1962 to 1997. His students included Claude Pichaureau, Thierry Escaich, Selman Ada, Olivier Chassain, François Weigel, Naji Hakim etc.

He also taught choral conducting at the Centre national de préparation au CAEM (Paris) from 1965 to 1970, and from 1963 he was in charge of preparing the writing tests for the recruitment competitions for army music conductors.

In January 1973, after a competition on title, he was appointed music director of the Republican Guard and thus conducted the harmony orchestra, symphony orchestra, string orchestra and chamber music ensembles until February 1997.

First military band leader to hold the rank of colonel, he was appointed honorary president of the French Republican Guard Band. Grand Prix Musical of the Ville de Paris (1963) for the Rosaire de Joies - Prix Georges Bizet of the Institut de France (Académie des Beaux Arts) (1967) for the Concerto for Orchestra - Grand Prix de la Promotion Symphonique of the Sacem (1970) - Prix de la Fondation Pineau-Chaillou (1971) for Rosaire de Joies, Concerto-Fantaisie, Reflets sur Rome - Grand Prix of the Académie Charles Cros (1974) for the record "les Chefs d’œuvres de la musique russe" - Prix Sacem (Pierre and Germaine Labole) (1979) for the whole of his work for harmony orchestra.

He died in the 14th arrondissement of Paris in 2019.

== Selected discography ==
- Tubacchanale by David Maillot saxhorn and Géraldine Dutroncy, piano at Hybrid'Music (October 2008)
- Musiques de kiosque with Maurice André (trumpet) and the orchestre de la Garde républicaine (conductor Roger Boutry).
- Tableaux symphoniques pour orchestre, by Boutry, LP Versailles VER 35002 (1985) (but still analogic), with, as a program complement, Jean-Joseph Mouret's Première Suite and Albert Roussel's Petite Suite. As organist, Hakim Naji. Boutry Conducting the Orchestre symphonique de la Garde républicaine.
- Festival for clarinet quartet by the Edison Clarinets Quartet, Corelia 1998 CC 875.
- Boutry, Orchestral works (Ikiriu Yorokobi, Tétrade, Wu-Ji, Fête, Concerto for trumpet, Alternances, Chants de l'Apocalypse) by the Concert band of the Garde républicaine, Roger Boutry conducting, Corélia 2006 CC 850.
- French trumpet music with Daniel Doyon and the Brest Fleet Band, Corélia 2005.
- La clarinette de la Belle Époque, vol. I & Il, piano: Roger Boutry, clarinet: Sylvie Hue, REM (Polygram) 311209 XCD/ 311295 XCD.
- Breeze on the sea, with clarinettist Sylvie Hue, Édition Syrius (Coda) Syr 141349.
- Songe, sonates et croquis (including the Sonate pour violon seul, in three movements, dedicated to painter Paul Ambille), with Alexis Galpérine and Roger Boutry, L'algarade 2008.
- Concert pour l'année Honnorat with the Cité internationale Orchestra, Adrian McDonnell conducting, L'algarade 2011.
- Az'art, with Émilie Leclercq and Roger Boutry, Corelia 2011.
- French Masterworks for bassoon and piano by Laura Bennett Cameron bassoon and Roger Boutry piano, works by Boutry, Ibert, Debussy, Fauré, Vidal, Pierné, Damase, Dutilleux, and Fauré at Idésens 2016.
- Evocations, Musique Royale des Guides Belges, conducting and piano Roger Boutry, Robert Martin CD 076 (Variations sur un thème Imaginaire, Évocations, Trombonera, Éclats d'Azur, Métachrome)
