= Pierre Petit (composer) =

French composer

Pierre Petit (French: [pjɛʁ pəti]; 21 April 1922 – 1 July 2000) was a French composer.

== Life ==
Petit was born in Poitiers, the son of a professor of the khâgne. He studied literature and music in Paris (Hattemer Course, Lycée Louis-le-Grand) and literature at the Sorbonne. He studied at the Paris Conservatoire from 1942, his teachers included Georges Dandelot for music analysis, Nadia Boulanger for harmony, Noël Gallon for counterpoint and fugue, and Henri Busser for composition.

In 1946, he won the Premier Grand Prix de Rome with the lyrical scene Le jeu de l'amour et du hasard, which was performed in the same year by the orchestra of the Cadets du Conservatoire under the direction of Claude Delvincourt.

From 1951 Petit taught the history of civilization at the Conservatoire de Paris and the École polytechnique. In 1960, he began working for the Office de Radiodiffusion Télévision Française. At first he was head of light music, and then from 1965 he was musical director. Among others, he produced music for accords parfaits, contre-ut, Presto, Figaro ci figaro là.

In 1963, he was appointed director of the École normale de musique de Paris, succeeding Alfred Cortot and working alongside such musicians as Nadia Boulanger, Georges Dandelot, Alfred Desenclos, Norbert Dufourcq and Marguerite Roesgen-Champion. He held the position for 35 years, when he was succeeded by Henri Heugel. His students included Roger Bellon.

He was also on the jury of the Long-Thibaud-Crespin Competition.

=== Output and awards ===
Petit composed operas, operettas and ballets, orchestral works, concertos, chamber music and songs. He was also noted as a music writer, writing books on Verdi, Ravel, Mozart, and a study of the musical problems of Aristotle. He was also a music critic for Le Figaro.

For his musical work, in 1965 he was awarded the Grand Prix du Conseil Général de la Seine, and in 1985, the Grand Music Prize of SACEM.

=== Personal life ===
He married the singer Christiane Castelli, famous for her interpretation of Tosca at the Opéra de Paris. They had three children, Claude (journalist and writer), Didier (singer, songwriter and performer under the name Romain Didier) and Marie-Laurène. Later he married the violinist Marie-Claude Theuveny in 1958, and had two children with her, Carolin Petit, composer and arranger of music for film and television, and Nicolas. Finally, in 1974 he married his third wife Liliane Fiaux.

== Works ==
=== Compositions ===
- Mélodie for voice and piano, 1941
- 6 Petites pièces à 4 mains, piano pieces for children, 1942
- Concertino pour piano, 1942
- Suite für vier Celli, 1942
- Bois de Boulogne, five pieces for piano, 1946
- La Maréchale Sans-Gêne, operetta, 1948
- Zadig, ballet, 1948
- Deux mélodies sur des poèmes de Charles Oulmont, 1949
- Romanza romana, 1950
- Ciné-Bijou, ballet after jazz themes, composed for Roland Petit, 1952
- Feu rouge, feu vert, ballet, 1953
- Saxopéra, for saxophone, 1955
- Furia italiana, opera, 1958
- Concertino for organ, strings and percussion, 1958
- Concerto pour tête-à-tête, opera, 1959
- Migraine, comic opera, 1959
- Toccata et Tarentelle for two guitars, 1959
- Andante und Fileuse for saxophone, 1959
- Concerto for two guitars, 1964
- Quatre poèmes de Paul Gilson, 1965
- Le Diable à deux for two pianos, 1970
- Tarentelle for orchestra, 1971
- Suite for two cellos and orchestra, 1974
- Orphée, ballet, 1975
- Oregon, piano suite for children, 1979
- Mouvement perpétuel for guitar, 1984

=== Writings ===
- Autour de la chanson française, 1952
- Verdi, 1958
- Ravel, 1970
- Mozart, 1991
