= Augustin Pesnon =

French classical guitarist

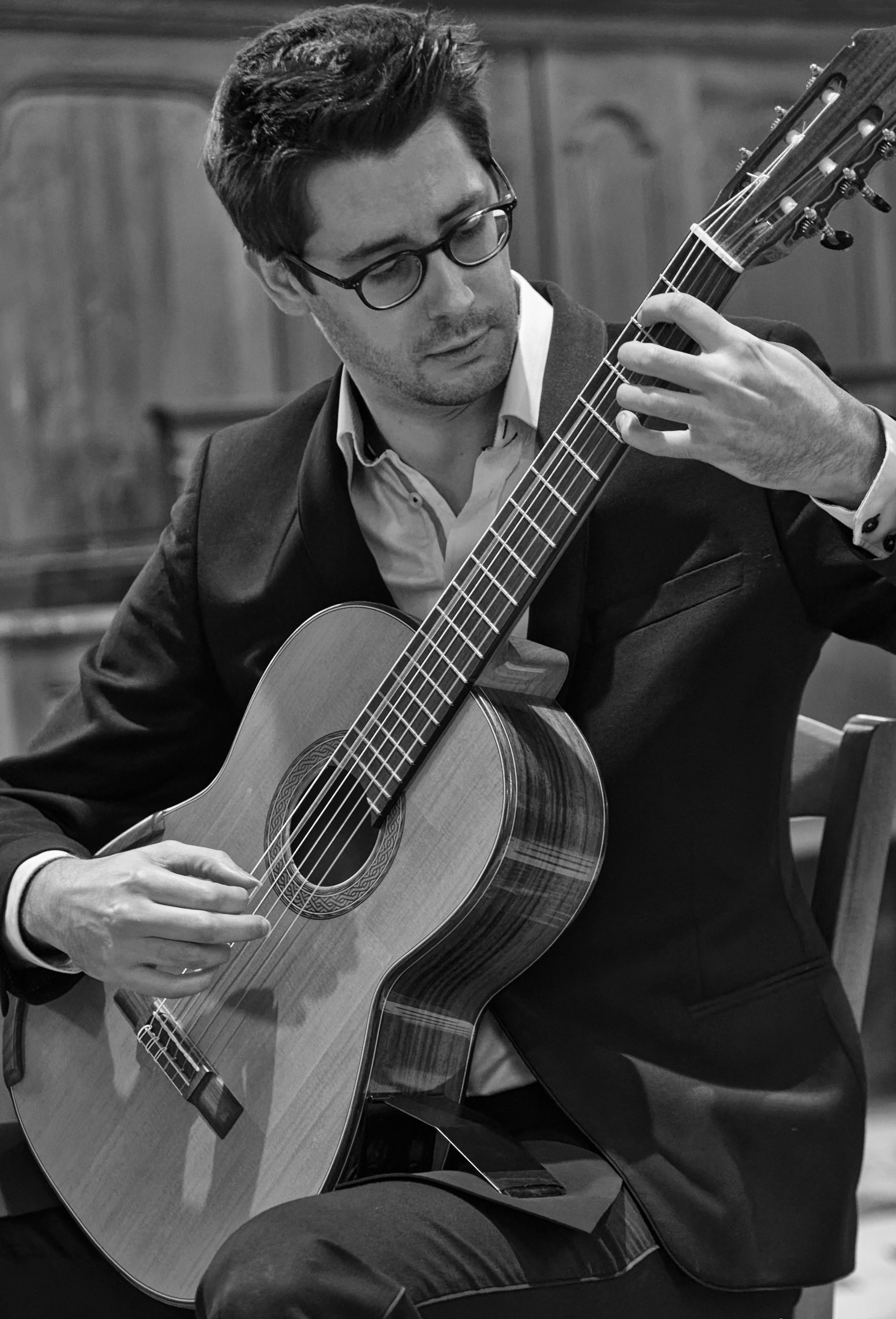
- Pesnon performing, 2017
- Born: 31 March 1988 (age 36); Clamart, France
- Education: National University of Music Bucharest; École Normale de Musique de Paris
- Known for: Founder of Paris Guitar Foundation
- Musical career
- Genres: Classical music
- Instrument: Classical guitar
- Discography: Aurora (2011)
- Years active: 2007–present
- Labels: Logik Production 36
- Website: parisguitarfoundation.com

Augustin Grégoire Pesnon (born 31 March 1988) is a French classical guitarist, teacher and founder and CEO of Paris Guitar Foundation.

== Early life ==
Pesnon was born on 31 March 1988 in Clamart, France, the oldest of two, into a family that is heavily involved with music. He spent most of his childhood in Évreux. His mother, Christine Prud'homme, is a kindergarten teacher and his father, Pierre Pesnon, is a dog breeder and retired rock guitarist. His maternal grandfather, Jean Prud'homme, was an active church organist and pianist during his life. Pesnon first picked up the guitar at the age of 5 and started learning intensively under the supervision of his father. He attended Conservatoire d’Évreux where he met Arnaud Dumond at the age of 9. This encounter deeply affected his style and sound in the guitar playing.

He continued his technical education at National University of Music in Bucharest under Cătălin Ștefănescu. After he returned to France, he studied with Alberto Ponce, Genevieve Martigny and Devy Erlih at Ecole Normale de Musique de Paris Alfred Cortot. He earned his diplôme supérieur in chamber music; a license in musicology from the University Paris-Sorbonne; and a diplôme national supérieur professionnel in music from the Pôle supérieur d’enseignement artistique Paris Boulogne-Billancourt.

== Career ==
In 2007, Pesnon collaborated with the conductor Dorel Pascu-Radulescu and with the Bucharest Symphony Orchestra on Mauro Giuliani's "Guitar Concerto major, Op. 30. He signed with the Parisian label Logik Production 36 and released his first album, Aurora, in 2011. He was supported by the Forum Musical de Normandie foundation and the Rotary Club and learned from musicians such as Gérard Abiton, Gabriel Bianco, Jérémy Jouve, Rémi Jousselme, Judicaël Perroy, Denis Azabagić, Zoran Dukić, Adam Del Monte and Carlo Marchione.

In 2014, Pesnon founded the Paris Guitar Foundation (PGF), a Paris-based non-profit organisation that supports classical guitarists. As of August 2024, the foundation has more than 24,000 followers on its Facebook page and more than 7,900 subscribers on its YouTube channel. Today the foundation has 6 members, including guitarist Pierre Bibault, journalist Florent Passamonti and photographer Hervé Milliard. In 2015, he arranged a charity project through PGF for the Nagaland Guitar Society, where people could donate money, strings, books, guitar equipment and other music items. In 2017, the PGF was building a guitar school in Jakarta, Indonesia, and was setting up a music scholarship in France.

Pesnon started Sunday Live Concert, which had a maximum of 15 audience members, in 2016. Guitarists from all over the world perform a 1-hour concert, which is also live-streamed through the foundation's Facebook page. Every concert is opened by a Parisian guitar student. The first concert was held on 18 September 2016 and starred Gabriel Bianco. Xavier Jara, Duo Solaris, Rafael Aguirre Miñarro, and Samuelito have also performed. Pesnon is the creative director for all of PGF's YouTube videos.

He started teaching at the music conservatories in Châtillon and Asnières-sur-Seine in 2016, and joined the music faculty full-time at Conservatoire à Rayonnement Intercommunal in Viroflay in 2018. In 2019, along with contrabassist Stanislas Kuchinsky and percussionist Vitier Vivas, he started a trio that plays pieces inspired by Spanish music. Pesnon himself has gained recognition and success through the 10 international competition he has won so far, most notably the Thailand International Guitar Festival, Nuits Musicales de Cieux, Calcutta International Classical Guitar Festival & Competition and Gitarrenfestival Nordhorn. He performs regularly in countries such as Germany, Austria, UAE, India, Italy, Japan, Romania, and Thailand.

Pesnon plays on a Greg Smallman guitar and uses products from Karura and PGF's sponsor D'Addario.

== Personal life ==
Pesnon resided in the 17th arrondissement of Paris from 2016 until 2020, and used his residence as the headquarter of Paris Guitar Foundation. He currently resides in the suburb of Chaville with his wife.
