= Éric Pénicaud =

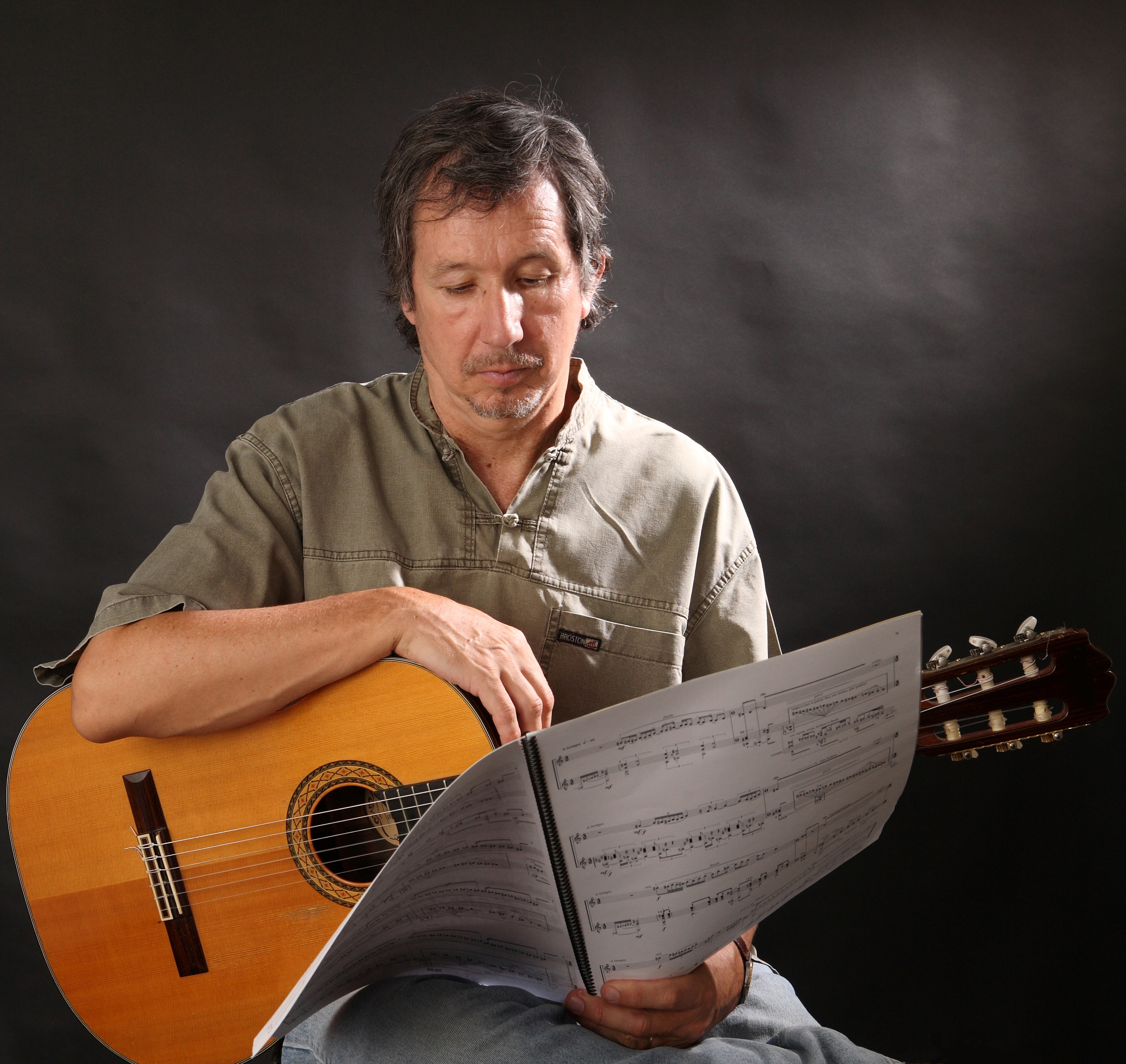
Éric Pénicaud in 2008

Éric Pénicaud (born 14 June 1952) is a French classical composer, classical guitarist and improviser.

== Training ==
Born in Casablanca, from the age of seven, Pénicaud received "customized" and non-institutional musical training, first with his father (a good amateur guitarist who had learned from his mother, who herself had learned from his father; it would be necessary to go back in time to the ancient family history, to Ricardo Viñes, Pablo Casals, as well as to Ravel, Fauré, and even to the old Brahms), then with friends of his music-loving family, teachers and concert performers (for example between the ages of eleven and thirteen, it was Narciso Yepes who gave him his precious advice). At the same time, he studied all the compás of flamenco. He also began to learn about jazz and improvisation from the age of thirteen. Pénicaud first gave many classical - and flamenco - performances in private circles, but now he will play in public, in other musical genres (for example in jazz alongside Laurent Petitgirard at the organ of the Américan Center in Paris).

== Guitarist ==
At the age of nineteen, he left the capital for Provence (advanced training - instrument and writing - teaching). He perfected his skills with René Bartoli, then with Leo Brouwer, Abel Carlevaro, Javier Hinojosa, as well as Paco Peña and Manolo Sanlucar for flamenco. Later on, there will be other festivals in Provence, with for example Juan Carmona or the Chemirani sons (oriental percussions). He will also improvise a lot - sometimes to his own music - with jazz players, Larry Coryell, Raphaël Faÿs, Jaco Pastorius, Barre Phillips...

== Composer ==
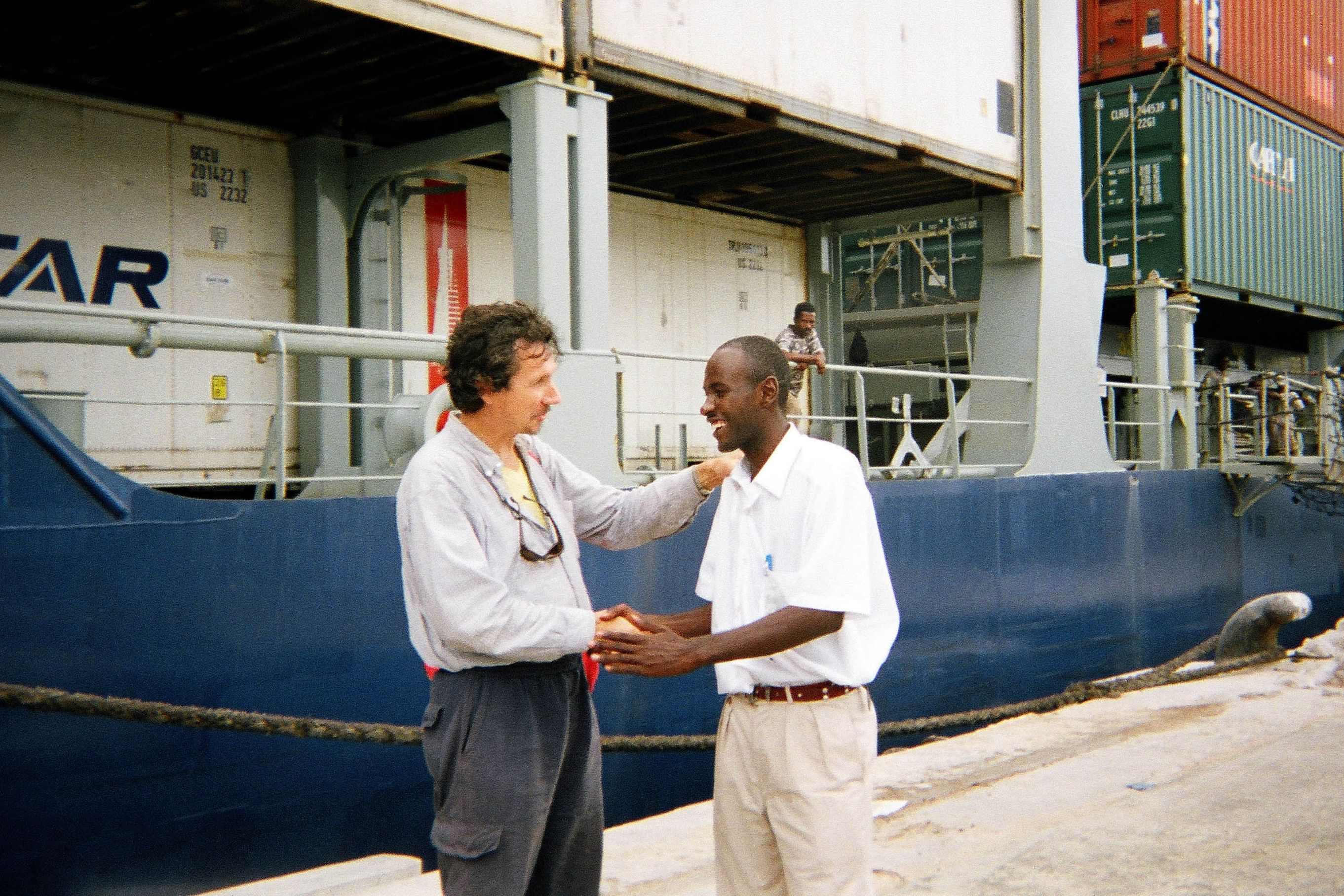
Stopover at Mombasa

This eclecticism acquired since childhood allows him to blend into each genre and will paradoxically lead him to refocus on musical composition, for which he was guided at first by his uncle and composer Stéphane Caplain. He can also be guided by the sea, the wind, the stars as Debussy and Ohana recommended: he travelled the Mediterranean by sailboat for years (later it would be all the oceans by cargo ship). He collects in passing many so-called "ethnic" music and he deepens again and again the writing of ancient and modern masters (since Machaut, to Stravinsky, Bartók, Messiaen, Ohana etc.).

Pénicaud is part of the "New Music" Composers Group, alongside personalities such as Thierry Escaich, Anthony Girard, Philippe Hersant, Michaël Sebaoun...

== His work ==
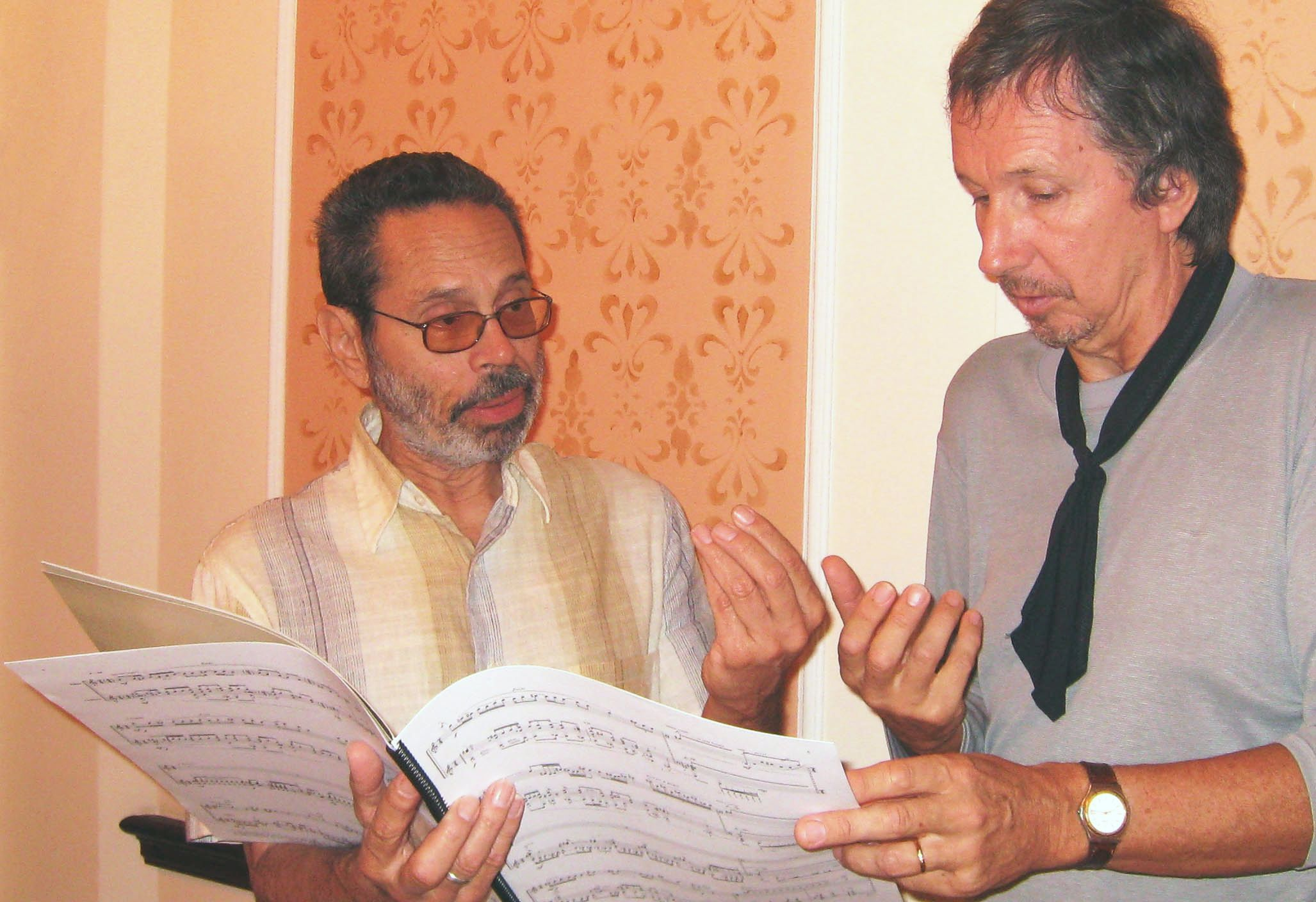
With Leo Brouwer, Italy, June 2008

His work won eight International Prizes for composition from 1984 to 2002: "Carrefour mondial de la guitare" (Martinique, 1984, 1988), Tokyo (1987), Italy (1999, 2000, 2001, 2002). In 2016, he was awarded the First Prize of Composition "International Art Society", in Volos, Greece; he also received the title "Artist of the Year": he is the only musician selected for this supreme distinction - all categories combined (for example in piano Martha Argerich) was mentioned.

This brings to ten the number of his International Awards. A work of a homogeneous quality that is recognized and praised everywhere, by many composers (Leo Brouwer, Régis Campo, Pascal Dusapin, Thierry Escaich, Philippe Fénelon, Philippe Hersant, Maurice Ohana...), various non-guitar great performers (flautist Pierre-Yves Artaud, percussionist Jean-Pierre Drouet, violists Garth Knox – former member of the Arditti Quartet and the Ensemble Intercontemporain - and Pierre-Henri Xuereb, conductors Daniel Oren, Gilles Colliard...), guitarists and music educators (Julian Bream, Abel Carlevaro, Alberto Ponce, Narciso Yepes...), eminent ambassadors of other musics that he has also played for a long time (Jaco Pastorius, Larry Coryell, Juan Carmona, Egberto Gismonti...), and also - because it goes far beyond that - by poets (Christian Bobin), writers (Erik Orsenna), marine painters (Titouan Lamazou), scientific thinkers (Boris Cyrulnik, Hubert Reeves)...

In addition to the guitar, Pénicaud has also written for some thirty instruments, piano, percussion, strings, various flutes, voice, harp, clarinet, oboe, string quartet, various ensembles, and many instruments in jazz formation (keyboards, bass guitar, various saxophones, etc.).

== His interpreters ==
Pénicaud's work is played, to mention only the guitarists - and the most representative - by Gérard Abiton, Roberto Aussel, Tania Chagnot, Arnaud Dumond, Roland Dyens, Éric Franceries, François Laurent, Sébastien Llinares, Olivier Pelmoine (Duo Cordes et Âmes with violinist Sara Chenal), Fabrizio Furci with the Russian mezzo-soprano Liliia Kolosova, Samuelito, Gaëlle Solal, Sébastien Vachez, duos like the Guitar Duo Transatlantique (Benjamin Beirs, USA / Maud Laforest, France), several guitar quartets (Quaternaglia Guitar Quartet as well as Italian quartets), guitar octets (from Paris, Harmonique XII from Betho Davezac, etc.), the Ensemble Polychronies, or even by Fabio Zanon (Brazil), Yiannis Andronoglou (Greece), Ishiro Suzuki, Shin-Ichi Fukuda, Gen Matsuda (Japan), Marco Tamayo (Cuba), Giulio Tampalini, Alberto Vingiano (Italy), Tatiana Kurenchakova (Russia), etc.

== Discography ==
- Guitare, 1990, Quantum classic
- Compositions Improvisations, 1995, Quantum classic
- Guitare-Puzzle, 1997, Quantum classic
- Musique de chambre avec guitare, 2006, Quantum classic
- Guitare du XXIe, 2010, (interpreted by Roberto Aussel, Tania Chagnot, Arnaud Dumond, Roland Dyens, Gaëlle Solal, Fabio Zanon, etc.), Quantum classic

Many press articles, for France: in Diapason, Le Monde de la musique, Classica-Répertoire, Les Cahiers de la Guitare, Guitare Classique... and abroad in Classical Guitar, U.K., Gendai Guitar, Japan, Guitar Review, USA, Seicorde, Italy, etc.

- Recording complement (some examples of other CDs made by performers who play Pénicaud) :
  - Ensemble Polychronies, CD Alchimie, 2004 –G. Kurtag, E. Pénicaud, T. Takemitsu...
  - CD accompanying various music magazines (example Guitare Classique, 2009...)
  - Duo Transatlantique (Maud Laforest -France- & Benjamin Beirs -USA-), CD From moment to moment, 2011 -D. Scarlatti, E. Pénicaud, C. Franck...
  - Éric Franceries and his daughter Chloé (flute), live, 7e Festival Guitares en Picardie, 2013.
  - Olivier Pelmoine, CD Opus Guitar at Skarbo, 2014.
  - Tatiana Kurenchakova, CD Enshrined in Music, at Artservice Ltd., Russia, 2016
  - And other CDs, in France, and also internationally (for example: Hungary, or the German music magazine Akustik Gitarre, 2013...).

=== Guitar solo ===
==== Concert ====
(main works)

- Deux berceuses (1974)
- Juste un petit gag (1979)
- Tsunami (1980)
- Forlane (1980, revised in 2000)
- Poissons volants (1981, revised in 1987)
- Le chant du torrent (10 strings, 1984, revised in for 6 strings, 2001)
- Parabole créole (10 strings, 1984, then for 6 strings, 2012)
- Deux études courtes (1986)
- Violão do Brasil (1987)
- Derviches tourneurs (1991)
- Irisation (1994)
- Mes étoiles au ciel... (2011)
- Puis le rayon vert (2012)
- J’irai dans les sentiers (2012)
- Improvisation XVII-XXI (2014)
- Minera / Miniatura (2018)

==== Pedagogy ====
(main works - for guitar -)

- Comme une suite (written in part in 1963, revised in 1992)
- Méthode de guitare flamenca (1974)
- Farruca (1974)
- Guitare Puzzle (1987)
- Atlantide (1987)
- Trois vieilles chansons françaises (1987)
- Les signes du Zodiaque (1988)
- Trois morceaux en Pommes de Foire (1988)
- Carrousel (1992)
- Five easy “pouces” (1992)
- Quelques notes d’un prélude (1993)
- Sky my Tango ! (1995)
- Romance (1996)
- Ballade (1996)
- Two easy pieces for Giovanni (2008)
- Sarabande (2008)
- Andalusian Dance (2013)

=== Several guitars ===
==== Concert ====
- Garrawog-Blues, for guitar octet (1974)
- Garrawog-Blues, for guitar quartet (1995)
- Little Suite for Children, for two guitars (2009)
- Thème, variations et carillon-version concertante, for solo guitar and guitar ensemble (2012)

==== Pedagogy ====
- Petite Suite pour les enfants, for three guitars (1974)
- Thème, variations et carillon, for guitar Ensemble (2010)

=== Chamber music with guitar ===
(main works)

- Le fil d’Ariane, for flute, viola and guitar (1976, revised in 2001)
- Noé, for clarinet - or oboe - and guitar (1976)
- Stable/Mouvants, for flute and guitar (1979, revised in 1997)
- Pour un Finale, for guitar and darbouka (early 1980s)
- Deux danses, for alto flute and guitar, taken from Oviri (early 1980s)
- Jubilatio, for voice and guitar (1992)
- Le nuage d’inconnaissance, quintet with guitar - string quartet + guitare (2000)
- Jubilatio for violin and guitar (2008)
- Stable/mouvants for violin and guitar (2009)
- Une saison aux Embiez for violin and guitar (2017)

=== Concerto ===
- Concerto pour le grand large, for guitar and string orchestra with alto flute. World premiere 10 November 2015, by Sébastien Llinares on guitar and the Toulouse Chamber Orchestra, Gilles Colliard conducting.

=== Work for mixed choir (SATB), two guitars and cello (instruments are amplified) ===
- Jusqu'en notre exil exil tu murmures (2017). After a poem by Pénicaud. Work dedicated to the vocal ensemble Unité and its choir director Christian Nadalet, to cellist Maitane Sebastián, and guitarists Sébastien Llinares and Nicolas Lestoquoy.

=== Jazz compositions, arrangements, examples of arrangements on his own works, etc. ===
- Dérive, for piano (1970s), then for 10-string guitar. (1982)
- Improvisation sur la Sarabande de Poulenc (orchestration sur un thème de Poulenc ), for guitar, or for oboe and guitar (1976, revised for solo guitar in 2013)
- Oviri, petit concerto pour le grand large, for guitar, alto flute, Rhodes piano, synthesizer (1980, revised in 1982)
- Manha do carnaval, for guitar (or voice/guitar), arrangement on a theme by Luiz Bonfá (1986)
- Summertime (orchestration for flute - or voice - and guitar on a theme by George Gershwin) (1988)
- Dadi Sixties, for guitar, arrangement on the theme "Echo-Sixties" by Marcel Dadi (1992)
- Le Blues de l’homme moderne, for guitar (1995)
- Ave Maria, for voice and guitar (2015)
- Garrawog Blues, Tsunami, Stable/Mouvants, Buisson ardent, Petite Suite pour les enfants, Le Fil d’Ariane, etc., with various orchestrations
- Pater Noster, for voice and guitar (2016), based on a theme by Nikolai Rimski-Korsakov. Several versions, using each of the four main voice registers and various languages, Latin, French, English, Spanish, Hungarian, Russian, Japanese, etc., the principle being to cover all five continents. Some versions are also open to non-classical musical genres, cante jondo, jazz, popular music...
