= Chapdelaine =

Chapdelaine is a surname. Notable people with the surname include:

- Auguste Chapdelaine, French Christian missionary
- Jacques Chapdelaine, Canadian football coach and player
- Michael Chapdelaine, American guitarist
- Rene Chapdelaine (born 1966), Canadian ice hockey player

== See also ==
- Maria Chapdelaine, novel
