= George Lindsay =

George Lindsay may refer to:

- George C. Lindsay (1855–1945), American classical guitarist
- George Campbell Lindsay (1863–1905), Scottish rugby union international
- George Edmund Lindsay (1916–2002), American botanist and museum director
- George H. Lindsay (George Henry Lindsay, 1837–1916), U.S. Representative from New York
- George W. Lindsay (George Washington Lindsay, 1865–1938), his son, U.S. Representative from New York
- George Lindsay (British Army officer) (1880–1956)
- George Broun-Lindsay (1888–1964), also known as George Lindsay, Scottish Unionist MP for Glasgow Partick, 1924–1929
- George Lindsay, 3rd Lord Spynie (died 1671), Scottish nobleman

== See also ==
- George Lindsey (1928–2012), American actor
- George Lindsay-Crawford, 22nd Earl of Crawford (1758–1808), Scottish peer and soldier
