= Thomas Heck =

American musicologist and librarian (1943-2021)

Thomas F. Heck
- Born: July 10, 1943; Washington, D.C., United States
- Died: October 3, 2021 (aged 78); Santa Barbara, California, United States
- Education: University of Notre Dame (BA); Yale University (PhD); University of Southern California (MLS)
- Occupations: Musicologist, classical guitarist, librarian
- Known for: Founder of the Guitar Foundation of America; Guitar historian and bibliographer
- Notable work: Mauro Giuliani: A Life for the Guitar; Picturing Performance
- Spouse: Anne Goodrich Heck
- Awards: GFA Hall of Fame Distinguished Service Award (2007)

Thomas Fitzsimons Heck (July 10, 1943 – October 3, 2021) was an American musicologist, classical guitarist, and librarian. He published research on guitar history and bibliography and helped establish the Guitar Foundation of America.

== Early life and education ==
Heck was born in Washington, D.C., but spent most of his youth in New Orleans and Paris, where his father served as a U.S. diplomat. He completed secondary school in France, earning the baccalauréat in 1960, and began to study the guitar during these years.

He earned his bachelor’s degree in liberal arts and music history from the University of Notre Dame in 1965 and a Ph.D. in Musicology from Yale University in 1970. While at Yale, he conducted dissertation research in Vienna as a Fulbright Scholar and later published his two-volume thesis on the nineteenth-century guitarist and composer Mauro Giuliani.

== Career and scholarship ==
After a commission as a U.S. Army first lieutenant, Heck taught music history at various universities including Case Western Reserve, John Carroll University, and Chapman University. He earned a Master of Library Science at the University of Southern California in 1977, and his first position as a librarian was at the Wisconsin Conservatory of Music. He later served for 22 years as head of the Music and Dance Library at the Ohio State University.

Heck's doctoral research became the basis for his book Mauro Giuliani: Virtuoso Guitarist and Composer (1995), and its updated edition, Mauro Giuliani: A Life for the Guitar (2013), published as part of the GFA Monograph Series.

Heck wrote and edited books, musical editions, and articles on the guitar, including:

- A Survey of Guitar Curricula in Colleges in the U.S. and Canada (1975)
- Le Rossiniane by Giuliani (facsimile edition, 1976–78)
- Sixteen Songs with Guitar Accompaniment by Schubert (1980)
- Guitar Music in the Archive of the Guitar Foundation of America (1981)

Heck also published on the iconography and literature of Italian comedy, including Commedia dell’Arte: A Guide to the Primary and Secondary Literature (1988) and The Commedia dell’Arte in Naples (2001). He also published Picturing Performance: The Iconography of the Performing Arts (1999). In addition, Heck published dozens of articles in Soundboard, Early Music, and other academic journals.

== Role in the Guitar Foundation of America ==
Heck convened the inaugural meeting of the Guitar Foundation of America in 1973 and drafted its articles of incorporation and bylaws. He attended every GFA convention thereafter and led the Research Round Table. He founded the GFA Archives, the GFA Monograph Series, and the peer-reviewed journal Soundboard Scholar. He also contributed a regular column titled "Works in Progress/Completed" in the GFA’s magazine, Soundboard, from its first issue in 1974.

In 2007, he received the GFA Hall of Fame Distinguished Service Award.

== Later life ==
After retiring to Santa Barbara, California, in 2001, Heck worked as a music minister, studied web design, supported nonprofit organizations, and volunteered in hospice care. He also initiated the digitization of 37 volumes of Soundboard magazine (1974–2010). The digitized volumes were subsequently made searchable for researchers.

== Personal life and death ==
Heck was married to Anne Goodrich for many years. He died in Santa Barbara on October 3, 2021, from complications of Parkinson’s disease.

== Selected publications ==
- Commedia dell’Arte: A Guide to the Primary and Secondary Literature. New York: Garland, 1988.
- Music Information Explosion and its Implications for College Teachers and Students. Missoula, MT: College Music Society, 1992.
- Mauro Giuliani: Virtuoso Guitarist and Composer. Columbus, OH: Editions Orphée, 1995.
- Picturing Performance: The Iconography of the Performing Arts. Rochester, N.Y: University of Rochester Press, 1999.
- The Commedia dell'Arte in Naples: A Bilingual Edition of the 176 Casamarciano Scenarios. Lanham, MD: Scarecrow Press, 2001 (with Francesco Cotticelli and Anne Goodrich Heck).
