= Gaëlle Solal =

French classical guitarist

Gaëlle Solal is a French female classical guitarist.

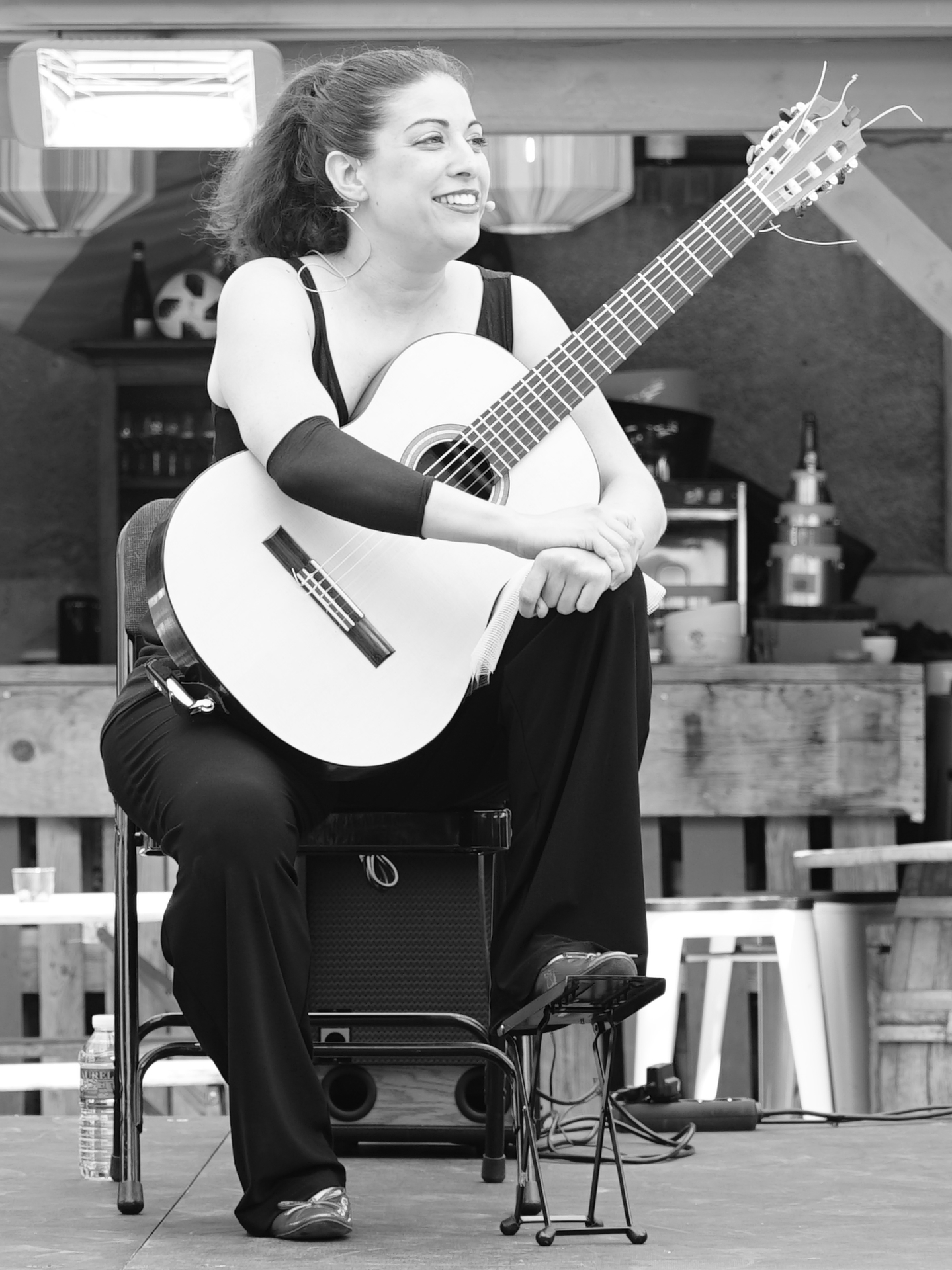

== Biography ==
Born in Marseille, Solal began her musical studies at the age of 6 with Christian Bullot and Sylvain Cinquini then with René Bartoli at the Conservatoire de Marseille. At 14, she was unanimously awarded three gold medals (guitar, musical training, chamber music) and the 1st Grand Prix of the city of Marseille. At the age of 16, she entered the Conservatoire de Paris where she obtained the 1st Prize for guitar unanimously as well as the cycle of perfection with Roland Dyens. From the Hochschule für Musik und Tanz Köln with Roberto Aussel to the Université du Québec in Montréal with Alvaro Pierri, her training is enriched by the master classes by A. Dumond, Carel Harms, Oscar Ghiglia, A. Goni and Leo Brouwer and Joaquin Clerch.

1st Grand Prize of the Michele Pittaluga International Classical Guitar Competition (first French woman to win it), 2nd Prize of the prestigious Guitar Foundation of America, she was finalist at the Concert Artists Guild Competition in New York, winner of the Beracasa, Meyer, Contestabile Foundations. She then began an international career: Festival de Radio France in Montpellier, Flâneries musicales de Reims, Festival de Torroella de Montgrí, Salle Cortot, Théâtre de la Villette, Cité de la Musique, Purcell Room in London. Tours will follow in India, Africa, Southeast Asia, United States, Mexico, Canada and Germany. She has given concerts in about thirty countries. She performs in solo recital as well as in duo within the Astor duo (from 1996 to 2005), as a chamber musician with clarinet (Florent Héau, Antonio Salguero), violin (Marina Chiche), flute (Alfonso Rubio), bandoneon (Jérémy Vannereau), string quartet (Cuarteto Arcadia), with the Chœur Nicolas de Grigny, the contemporary music ensemble "Zahir" and as a soloist with the Turin Philharmonic Orchestra, the French Republican Guard Band and the Berkeley Symphony Orchestra.

Passionate about contemporary music, she has performed Maurice Ohana's Concerto for the first time in Italy, the world premiere of N. Sekiya's Concerto with Kent Nagano, the premiere of three new pieces at the Córdoba Festival, the world premiere of a piece for clarinet and guitar by Félix Ibarrondo with Florent Héau.

Solal divides her time between concerts, master classes and international competition juries; she has taught at the Conservatories of Cordoba (2003 to 2004) and Seville (2004 to 2009).

== Awards ==
- 1998: 1st Frenchwoman to win the 1st prize of the Michele Pittaluga International Classical Guitar Competition
- 2006: 2nd prize of the Guitar Foundation of America

== Other formations ==
- Duo bandonéon/guitare with Jérémy Vannereau
