= Adam Holzman =

Adam Holzman may refer to:

- Adam Holzman (guitarist) (born 1960), American classical guitarist
- Adam Holzman (keyboardist) (born 1958), American jazz keyboardist
