= Manuel Y. Ferrer =

Spanish-American musical artist (1832-1904)

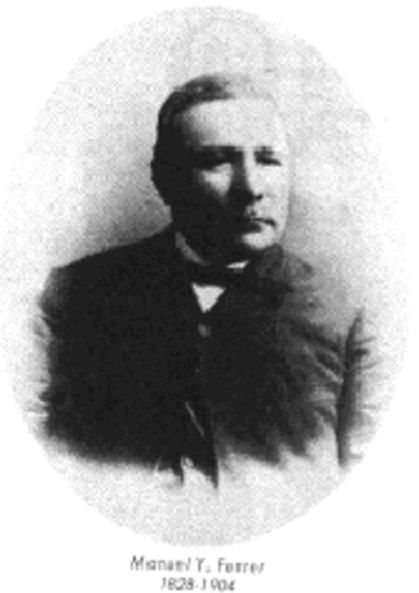

Background information
- Born: Manuel Ygnacio Ferrer; May 1832; San Antonio, Baja California
- Died: June 1, 1904 (aged 72) Oakland, California
- Genres: Classical music; Spanish music
- Occupation(s): Composer, arranger, guitarist, teacher
- Instrument: Classical guitar

Manuel Ygnacio Ferrer (May 1832 – June 1, 1904) was a Californio musician, regarded during his lifetime as one of the United States' finest virtuoso guitarists.

== Early life and career ==
He was born in San Antonio, Baja California Sur (Mexico) to Catalan parents from Spain. As a young man he left his native town, travelling by stage coach to Santa Barbara, in Alta California. He met a priest at mission Santa Barbara, a skilled guitarist, who gave him advanced instructions. Ferrer trained diligently, with the heightened enthusiasm that would gradually establish his reputation in the musical world. In 1850 he moved to San Francisco, where his public debut took place at a guitar concert in the Metropolitan Theatre on September 18, 1854. On November 22 of the following year, he performed with pianist Gustave A. Scott and harpist William McKorkell at the Music Hall.

Ferrer taught guitar and performed in San Francisco for fifty years. His wife Jesusita de Vivar was also a musician, as were three of his ten children: Adele (guitar), Carmelita (mandolin), and Ricardo (violin). The family toured in the east in 1891, where they performed at the White House and the Vanderbilt mansion in New York. His daughter, Jovita Ferrer who married Chesley Knight Bonestell Sr., was a talented soprano who died early. Jovita and Chesley were the parents of Chesley Knight Bonestell Jr., famed space artist. His public appearances as a guitar soloist, and also as a member of a guitar quartet, were very frequent in the San Francisco Bay Area.

For several years he was conductor of the mandolin band, El Mandolinita. The music performed by this orchestra was solely Ferrer’s compositions and arrangements. He published numerous pieces for guitar solo, but many of his works remained in manuscript.

Ferrer was a prolific teacher and composer, known for his collection Compositions and Arrangements for the Guitar, first published in 1882 in San Francisco and later reprinted in Boston. The collection included original works as well as arrangements of popular and classical pieces, often accompanied by Spanish-language songs. He collaborated with poets and musicians such as J.M. Paredes and David Nesfield to produce concert works that were performed by notable artists of the time.

== Death ==
He taught the guitar up to the time of his death, which occurred very suddenly on June 1, 1904. He had gone from his home in Oakland to San Francisco to teach, and gave several lessons, when he was suddenly taken ill, and went to the home of his daughter. Later he was removed to hospital, where he died the same day.

== Legacy ==
His students included Vahdah Olcott-Bickford, who after his death played a key role in preserving and promoting his legacy. After studying with Ferrer from a young age, she edited, arranged, and published many of his compositions, including solo works and songs with guitar accompaniment. Her efforts ensured that Ferrer’s music remained accessible to future generations, and she eventually donated his manuscripts to the International Guitar Research Archive.
