= Johannes Möller =

Johannes Möller may refer to:

- Jean Moeller or Johannes Möller, first professor of history at the Catholic University of Leuven
- Johannes Möller (guitarist), Swedish classical guitarist and composer
- Johannes Moller (headmaster), Danish pietist, headmaster of Flensburg's Latin School, and author
