= Elsa Grether =

French classical violinist

Elsa Grether is a French classical violinist who made her recital debuts at Carnegie Hall in New York, in Boston and at Berlin Philharmonie.

== Training ==
Born in Mulhouse, Grether began playing the violin at the age of five. She obtained a first prize in violin unanimously from the jury at the Conservatoire à rayonnement régional de Paris on her fifteenth birthday. She continued her training abroad at the Mozarteum University Salzburg with Ruggiero Ricci, then in the United States with Mauricio Fuks at the Indiana University Bloomington and Donald Weilerstein at the New England Conservatory of Music of Boston. She also benefited from the advice of Régis Pasquier in Paris.

== Style and repertoire ==
She has played numerous concertos (Bach, Vivaldi, Mozart, Haydn, Beethoven, Bruch, Brahms, Tchaikovsky, Shebalin, Dvorak, Prokofiev, Saint-Saëns, Ravel's Tzigane, Respighi, Tomasi, Kurt Weill, and others).

She has performed with Berlin Philharmonie, Folles Journées de Nantes, Printemps des arts de Monte-Carlo, Festival de Menton Bozar and Le Flagey in Brussels, Salle Cortot in Paris, Musica Festival in Strasbourg, Forest Festival, Sully Festival, Festival Lille Clef de Soleil, Palazzetto Bru-Zane in Venice, Radio Suisse-Romande in Geneva, Festival Musiques en Eté in Geneva, Festival Cully Classique (Switzerland), Flâneries musicales de Reims, ADAC Reims, Festival des Abbayes en Lorraine, Festival de Musique Sacrée de Perpignan, Festival Berlioz, Festival Présence Compositrices, Grandes Heures de Cluny, Chicago Myra Hess Concert Series, Mozarteum in Salzbourg, Radio Nationale d’Alger, Scène Nationale de Martinique, and others.

She collaborates in particular with pianists David Lively, Ferenc Vizi, François Dumont, as well as with Jérémy Jouve (guitar), Régis Pasquier (violin), Ophélie Gaillard (cello) etc.

She is also fond of the solo violin repertoire, performing in eclectic programmes ranging from Bach to contemporaries.

Grether is regularly heard on radios such as France Musique ( “Les Essentiels”, “Stars du Classique”, "La Matinale", dedicated full programs to her work) as well as BBC Radio 3, Radio National de Espana, Musiq3, ORTF and RTS Suisse.

In 2009, she won the Pro Musicis Award in Paris.

== Critics ==
Her six first CDs, released by Aparté and Outhere/ Fuga Libera, got favorable reviews, especially in specialized magazines (Gramophone, The Strad, BBC Music Magazine, FFFF Télérama, 5 Diapasons, 4 étoiles Classica, Qobuz, Concertclassic Classiquenews, Musikzen, Chalkedupreviews, ResMusica, Musicologie.org, La Libre Belgique, Artamag, Opus 51, Wunderkammern, la Revue du Spectacle, etc.)

== Discography ==
- March 2013: Poème mystique (Ernest Bloch, Arvo Pärt), recorded with the pianist Ferenc Vizi, Fuga Libera/Harmonia Mundi.
- November 2015: French Resonance (Gabriel Pierné, Louis Vierne and Gabriel Fauré) recorded with the pianist François Dumont, Fuga Libera/Outhere.
- June 2017: Kaléidoscope, solo violin (Bach, Tôn-Thất Tiết, Ysaÿe, Khachaturian, Honegger, Albéniz), recorded at the Fontevraud Abbey, Fuga Libera/Outhere.
- April 2019 : Sergueï Prokofiev Masques (Sergueï Prokofiev), recorded with the pianist David Lively, Fuga Libera/Outhere.
- September 2022 : Maurice Ravel Complete Works for Violin and Piano (Ravel), recorded with the pianist David Lively, Aparté.
- April 2025: Granada/ Spanish music for violin and piano, recorded with pianist Ferenc Vizi, Aparté
