= Ron Purcell =

American guitarist and academic (1932 – 2011)

Ronald C. Purcell
- Born: October 5, 1932; Santa Clara, California, U.S.
- Died: September 7, 2011 (aged 78); Sherman Oaks, California, U.S.
- Education: Los Angeles Conservatory of Music (B.Mus., 1960); California State University, Northridge (M.A., 1970)
- Occupation: Classical guitarist · Educator · Scholar · Archivist
- Years active: 1960–2006
- Organizations: California State University, Northridge; Guitar Foundation of America; International Guitar Research Archive; American Guitar Society; American String Teachers Association (ASTA)
- Known for: Founder of CSUN’s guitar department; founding president of Guitar Foundation of America; creator and director of the International Guitar Research Archive
- Spouse(s): Joanne B. Purcell (d. 1984); Beth Purcell (m. 1985)
- Children: Four (including two stepchildren)

Ronald Charles Purcell (October 5, 1932 – September 7, 2011) was an American guitarist, with degrees from the Los Angeles Conservatory of Music and California State University, Northridge. He was Professor Emeritus of the Department of Music at California State University, Northridge and Director of the International Guitar Research Archive. His major teachers included Andrés Segovia, Emilio Pujol, Macario Santiago Kastner, Alirio Diaz and Mario Castelnuovo-Tedesco, whose Hommage to Purcell, Op. 170, No. 38 is dedicated to him.

== Early life and career ==
Purcell was born in Santa Clara, California. He studied music at the Los Angeles Conservatory of Music, earning a (Bachelor of Music degree in 1960, and California State University, Northridge, graduating from CSUN (then known as San Fernando Valley State College) with a master's degree in 1970. Purcell joined the faculty at CSUN in 1971 and taught until his retirement in 2006. He produced recordings with Klavier Records and El Maestro Records and published two books and numerous performance editions with Chanterelle, Warner/Chappell (formerly Belwin-Mills) and editions with Mel Bay Publishing Co. including the complete works of Miguel Llobet and works by Laurindo Almeida. Purcell wrote many scholarly journal articles, as well as books on Andres Segovia and Vahdah Olcott-Bickford. He served as the first president and later as a board member for the Guitar Foundation of America (GFA) and as editor for the American String Teachers Association, Guitar Division, ASTA Journal. He was the chairman of the board of directors for the American Guitar Society and director of the International Guitar Research Archives (IGRA), where he collected thousands of scores and archival materials. Purcell was elected vice president to the board of directors for the Augustine Foundation in New York City.

== Personal life ==
His first wife was Joanne B. Purcell, a professor of romance languages at the University of California, Davis until her death from cancer in 1984. He married Beth Purcell in 1985. Purcell had a son and two daughters, along with two stepchildren.

== Death ==
Purcell died on September 7, 2011, at the age of 78 at his home in Sherman Oaks, California.

== Legacy ==
An annual student fellowship and scholarship is given in Purcell's memory at California State University, Northridge. The International Guitar Research Archives (IGRA), held in the University Library at California State University, Northridge, have grown since his death, with recent acquisitions of the Reginald Smith Brindle collection, the Guitar Foundation of America archive, and many others.

== Honors ==
- Chairman, Board of Directors, American Guitar Society.
- Founder and Director, International Guitar Research Archive. (https://web.archive.org/web/20110719135326/http://library.csun.edu/igra/)
- Vice President, Board of Directors, Augustine Foundation, NYC.
- Former President and board member, Guitar Foundation of America
- Former Editor, ASTA Journal, American String Teachers Association, Guitar Division,
