= IGRA =

IGRA or Igra may refer to:

- Indian Gaming Regulatory Act, a law governing Native American (Indian) gambling industries
- Interferon gamma release assay, a lab test used in tuberculosis diagnosis
- International Gay Rodeo Association, a sanctioning body for gay rodeos
- International Guitar Research Archive, a specialized research collection
- Igra, a rural locality (a settlement) in the Udmurt Republic, Russia
- Integrated Global Radiosonde Archive, collecting worldwide radiosonde observations.
- Meshullam Igra (c. 1752–1801), Galician rabbi
