= George C. Lindsay =

American musician (1855 – 1945)

George C. Lindsay (1855 – 1945) was an American composer and guitarist. He taught the celebrated guitarist Vahdah Olcott-Bickford after hearing her play when she was nine years old, and became her lifelong friend. He was also the first president of the American Guitar Society.
