= Martha Masters (musician) =

American classical guitarist (born 1972)

Martha Masters (born 23 September 1972) is an American classical guitarist. She won the 2000 Guitar Foundation of America international solo competition. Masters is the President of the GFA.

She received both Bachelor and Master of Music degrees from the Peabody Conservatory in Baltimore, where she studied with Manuel Barrueco, and completed the Doctor of Musical Arts degree at the University of Southern California as a student of Scott Tennant.

Masters was born in Fairborn, Ohio. She is currently a professor and guitar instructor at Loyola Marymount University in Los Angeles, California, where she also directs the LMU Guitar Ensemble.

== Discography ==
- Serenade (The Orchard, 2000)
- Guitar Recital (Naxos, 2001)
- Musings (GSP, 2005) with Risa Carlson as Duo Erato
- Viaggio in Italia (GSP, 2006)
- Viaje in Espana (GSP, 2009)

== Video ==
- GFA Winner 2000 (Mel Bay)
