= Vahdah Olcott-Bickford =

American guitarist (1885 – 1980)

- at Champlain, New York

Background information
- Born: Ethel Lucretia Olcott; October 17, 1885; Norwalk, Ohio, U.S.
- Died: May 18, 1980 (aged 94) Los Angeles
- Genres: Classical
- Occupations: Musician, astrologer
- Instrument: Guitar

Vahdah Olcott-Bickford (October 17, 1885 – May 18, 1980) was an American astrologer (Note: Olcott-Bickford was an astrology enthusiast most of her life, and there is evidence that she worked occasionally as an astrologer. See Garcia, 2018.) and guitarist, known as "the Grand Lady of the Guitar."

== Early life ==
She was born in Norwalk, Ohio (Note: One source states that she was born in Sandusky, Ohio. See Noonan, 2007.) as "Ethel Lucretia Olcott" and died as "Vahdah Olcott-Bickford Revere", having married twice.

Her family moved to Socorro and then Los Angeles when she was an infant. She started guitar lessons at the age of eight and then, by chance, met the classical guitarist George C. Lindsay and played for him when she was still just nine. This was the start of a lifelong friendship in which Lindsay first tutored her and then introduced her to the famous guitarist, Manuel Y. Ferrer. Ferrer invited her to stay with his family in Berkeley where he gave her daily lessons for a year until he died suddenly in 1904. She then returned to her family and published her first major work, Theme for variations on Nel cor più non mi sento.

== Career and contributions ==
Olcott-Bickford moved to New York in 1911 where she began performing and teaching. Among her early students were Cornelius Vanderbilt and Bernard Baruch. She met Evangeline Adams who helped her choose her stage name, Vahdah. In 1919 she became the first woman to make a guitar recording. In 1923, she moved back to Southern California and was instrumental in founding the American Guitar Society (AGS) in Los Angeles. She also served on the first Board of Directors of the Guitar Foundation of America.

Olcott-Bickford continued to teach and to write for The Crescendo, a major guitar journal, and with her husband established ZarVah Publishing Company. She was likely the first ever female music director of a mixed-gender guitar orchestra in the United States.

Appointed musical director for the AGS in 1923, she arranged works and guided rehearsals and performances without financial compensation. Under her leadership, AGS concerts evolved into themed, educational programs that introduced members to early music, modern European and Latin American composers, and a broad range of repertoire, though works by women composers remained rare. She also spearheaded the AGS Publication Fund, which between 1925 and 1963 issued twenty anthologies of guitar music, many of which she personally arranged, edited, and distributed to members worldwide. Despite limited resources, Olcott Bickford volunteered tirelessly on behalf of AGS, sustaining its concerts, publications, and community for decades while balancing her career as a performer, teacher, and writer.

She taught at the Zoellner Conservatory of Music in Los Angeles, wrote articles espousing the beauty of the guitar, and won music competitions. She also wrote over 150 operas for guitar, and founded both the Women's Chamber Music Society of Hollywood and the local chapter of the Music Teachers Association. Ron Purcell, late professor of music at California State University, Northridge, was her student from 1955 when he studied at the Los Angeles Conservatory of Music and Arts. He and other pupils were taught guitar playing in the music room at her house in the Hollywood Hills where she taught a technique of playing with the right hand using the pads of the fingers to pluck the strings, rather than the fingernails.

== Legacy ==
Olcott-Bickford amassed a large library of music, journals and correspondence about the guitar and other similar instruments. Her house in the Hollywood Hills was damaged by the 1971 San Fernando earthquake and this threatened the collection. The house was condemned and moving the huge collection then took 15 men over 17 days. On her death, the collection was bequeathed to California State University, Northridge where it formed the foundation of its International Guitar Research Archive, now held in Special Collections and Archives in the CSUN University Library.

Olcott-Bickford was a regular columnist for leading BMG journals, including Crescendo, Cadenza, and Serenader, where she promoted the guitar as a serious concert instrument. In addition to performing on guitar, terz guitar, lute, ukulele, and mandolin, she authored method books, published original compositions, and produced numerous arrangements and transcriptions of classical and popular works, including themed volumes devoted to Russian, Spanish, Mexican, and European repertoire. Through her performances, publications, and promotional efforts, she was regarded as one of the most influential figures in North American classical guitar during the first half of the twentieth century.

== Personal life and death ==
Olcott-Bickford married Myron Bickford (also known as Zarh Bickford) in 1915, and changed her name to Vahdah Olcott-Bickford. After her husband died in the early 1960s, she married Robert Revere. She died in Los Angeles in 1980 at the age of 94.

== Publications ==
- Olcott-Bickford, Vahdah; Bickford, Zarh Myron (1920). Bickford Method for the Ukulele. Boston, Mass.: Oliver Ditson Co.
- Olcott-Bickford, Vahdah (1921). Olcott-Bickford Method for the Guitar. New York: Oliver Ditson Co.
- Olcott-Bickford, Vahdah (1924). Advanced Course for the Guitar. Boston: Oliver Ditson Co.
- Olcott-Bickford, Vahdah (1964). Method for Classic Guitar. New York: Peer International Corp.
- Olcott-Bickford, Vahdah (1967). Advanced Course for Classic Guitar. New York: Peer International Corp.
