= Soundboard (magazine) =

Soundboard is a magazine published quarterly by the Guitar Foundation of America (GFA). The GFA is a 501(c)(3) non-profit organization dedicated to furthering interest and knowledge of the guitar - primarily the classical guitar and classical guitar music. The magazine was started in 1974 and features academic research, interviews, listings of upcoming master classes and conventions, and more. The headquarters is in Palos Verdes Peninsula, California.
