= Jérémy Jouve =

French classical guitarist (born 1979)

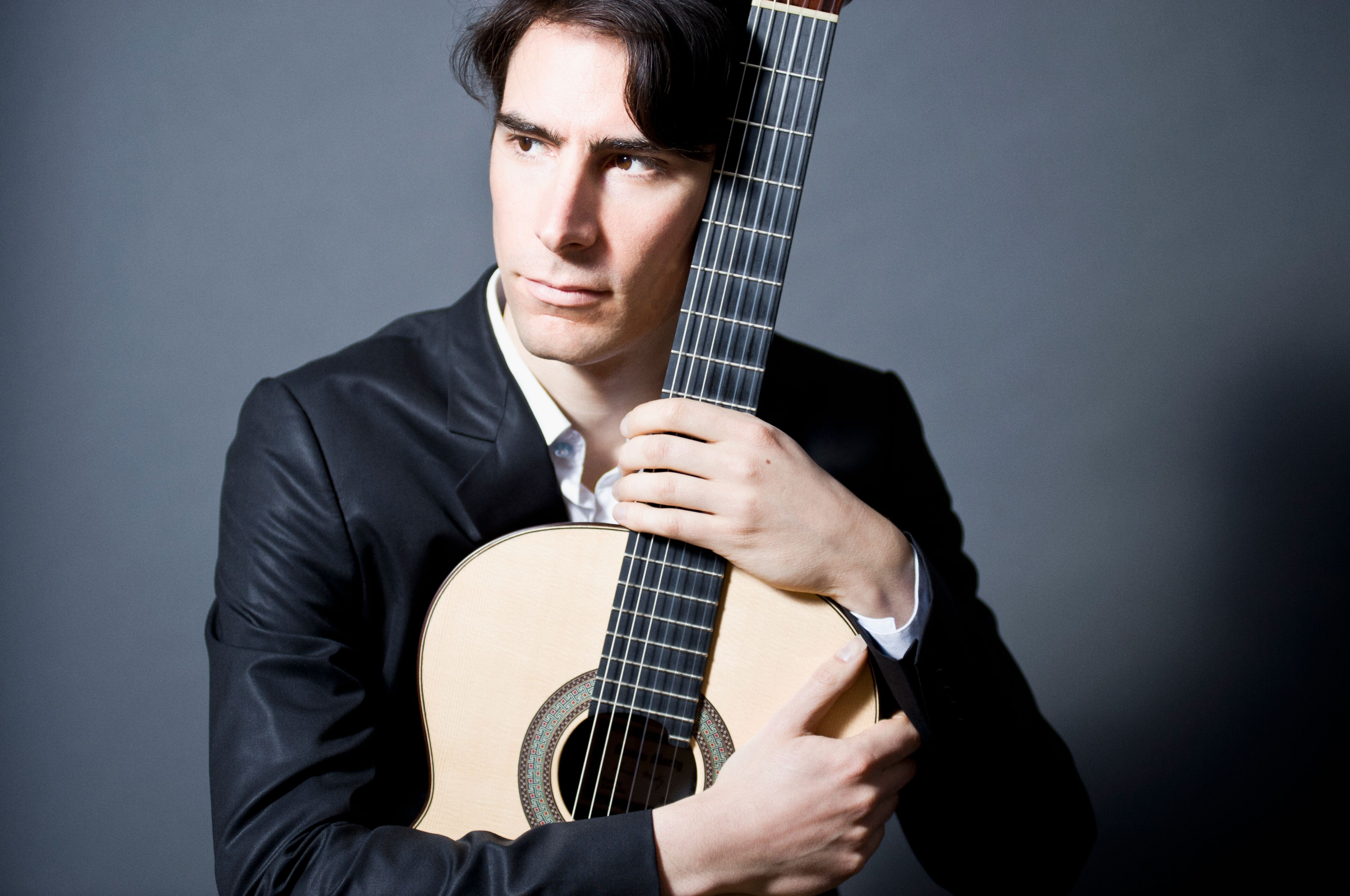
Jérémy Jouve

Jérémy Jouve (born 7 August 1979) is a French classical guitarist. He was one of nine Frenchmen to win the Guitar Foundation of America International competition.

== Biography ==
Born in Échirolles (Auvergne-Rhône-Alpes), Jouve started playing guitar at the age of 7. A student at the National School of Music in Chambéry, he attended Daniel Herbelot's classes from 1987 to 1992. At the age of 10, he interpreted a concerto by Vivaldi as soloist with the Chambéry Orchestra.

He later went to the École normale de musique de Paris to perfect his skill with Alberto Ponce, with whom he continued his guitar training at the Conservatoire de Paris until 2000. Roland Dyens then became his teacher. Jouve obtained the Diploma of Higher Formation, specialty guitar of the Conservatoire in 2001.

Since 2003, his career has had an international outreach: from the 40-date tour, when he won the famous Guitar Foundation of America international competition, on stages abroad, Jouve registers as a new French guitar ambassador.

A musician open to all styles, described as eager for musical encounters, he plays with accuracy, in a classical, contemporary repertoire, in chamber music as well as in solo music.

Jouve has collaborated with numerous musicians including:

- in chamber music with Gérard Abiton, Pierre Fouchenneret, Elsa Grether, Nicolas Jouve (his brother), Christophe Morin, Roland Dyens, Éric Franceries, Mathias Duplessy, Sébastien Droy and Prabhu Edouard.

Very committed, he collaborates closely with Mathias Duplessy for the composition of certain pieces for solo guitar. Notably during his last album Cavalcade, which received good media reviews.

His interpretation of Britten's Nocturnal is a reference, as is his interpretation of the work for solo guitar by Joaquín Rodrigo.

Since his first solo album in 2004, he has recorded five albums, two of which are dedicated to the solo guitar work of composer Joaquín Rodrigo.

The Traveling Sonata album, in duet with the flautist Viviana Guzmán brought him a nomination to the Grammy Awards.

At the same time as his tours and recordings, Jeremy Jouve has taught guitar since 2018 at the Conservatoire de musique de Genève and has been named professor at the Conservatoire à rayonnement régional de Paris.

== Awards ==
Jouve has won several prizes including:

- First Prize of the GFA international competition, organised in Mexico in 2003.
- First Prize of the International Guitar Competition of Tychy in 2002.
- Gold Medal Award and Developmental Award in 1993.

In 2014, his album Traveling Sonata, a duet with flute, recorded at Skywalker Studio in San Francisco, was nominated to the Grammy Awards.

In 2015 his album Cavalcade joined the FIP official selection of April.
