= Quaternaglia Guitar Quartet =

Brazilian guitar ensemble

The Quaternaglia Guitar Quartet (QGQ) is a classical guitar ensemble from São Paulo, Brazil, founded in 1992. The Quartet has become a reference both for its artistic excellence and for its contributions to the expansion of the guitar quartet repertoire. Quaternaglia has developed a canon of original pieces and arrangements with the collaboration of a variety of composers such as Egberto Gismonti, Leo Brouwer, Javier Farías, Sérgio Molina, Almeida Prado, Sergio Assad, João Luiz, Paulo Bellinati and Marco Pereira Quaternaglia’s current members are Sidney Molina, Thiago Abdalla, Fabio Ramazzina and Chrystian Dozza.

== History ==
In 1992, Sidney Molina, Daniel Clementi, Eduardo Fleury and Breno Chaves (who replaced Guilherme de Camargo after 2 concerts) began to experiment with the guitar quartet repertoire and much of their initial work was dedicated to discovering the adequate sound for the formation since, at the time, it still did not have an established set of works and records with which to orient them. As the fruits of this arduous research process began to be performed in concert halls in São Paulo, Quaternaglia Guitar Quartet gained recognition and in 1993 was given a sponsorship by Banco do Estado de São Paulo (Banespa) to perform in various cities in the interior of the state.

In 1994, Clementi was replaced by Fabio Ramazzina and, with him, the group recorded its first album in 1995. Quaternaglia (JHO) includes the first recording of the guitarist Sergio Abreu’s transcription of Bachianas Brasileiras No.1 by Heitor Villa-Lobos and the complete works for guitar quartet by the Cuban composer Leo Brouwer. This inaugural album set an example of a high level of artistic production for many other Brazilian classical guitar artists during the last half of the 1990s and was immediately recognized by important musicians in Brazil such as the composer Gilberto Mendes.

In 1996, Quaternaglia made their first appearance abroad at the First International Abel Carlevaro Guitar Festival in Montevideo, Uruguay and in 1998, the group reached international acclaim after receiving the Ensemble Prize at the International Guitar Contest of Havana, Cuba. QGQ has toured the United States fourteen times (1997, 1999, 2002, 2003, 2005, 2007, 2008, 2009, 2010, 2013, twice in 2015, 2018, 2020) performing in important chamber and guitar series such as Guitarists of the World, Allegro Guitar Series, Chamber Music Sedona, Friends of Music, Round Top Festival and New York City Classical Guitar Society. The group has also performed in Europe, Latin America and Australia.

The second album, Antique (Comep), with transcriptions of Renaissance and Baroque pieces was one of the finalists of the Classical Music Sharp Prize, the Brazilian equivalent of the Grammy. The group also received the 1997 Carlos Gomes Prize for Best Chamber Ensemble of the Year, awarded by the Culture Department of São Paulo.

In 1999, Breno Chaves was replaced by Paulo Porto Alegre and a year later, the quartet released its third album, entirely dedicated to Brazilian music. Forrobodó (Carmo/ECM), produced by Egberto Gismonti, marked the beginning of Quaternaglia’s direct contact with contemporary Brazilian composers and many of the pieces soon became influential in the world of modern guitar ensembles such as "A Furiosa" by Paulo Bellinati and "Forrobodó" by Egberto Gismonti.

In 2002, Quaternaglia was invited by the Brazilian Symphony Orchestra to perform Concierto Andaluz by Joaquín Rodrigo at the Municipal Theatre of Rio de Janeiro as part of the celebration of the composer’s centenary.

Also in 2002, Fernando Lima and João Luiz replaced Paulo Porto Alegre and Eduardo Fleury. With this configuration, the quartet toured the United States many times and premiered Journey of the Weary Souls and Quintet for Another Time both by Sergio Molina, commissioned by the International Guitar Festival at Round Top (TX, USA).

The 2004 CD Presença includes the first world recording of Quartet No. 1 by Radamés Gnattali and has pieces dedicated to Quaternaglia by the Brazilian composers Rodrigo Vitta, Paulo Tiné, Douglas Lora and Sergio Molina. Two years later, QGQ recorded their first live DVD at Itaú Cultural Hall in São Paulo.

Paola Picherzky participated in the group between 2007 and 2010 and Chrystian Dozza has been a member since 2009. In 2007, Quaternaglia made the Brazilian premiere of the Quintet for Another Time with the American pianist James Dick. In the following year, QGQ performed Gismontiana, a concert for four guitars and string orchestra written by the Cuban composer Leo Brouwer, as an invited soloist of OCAM (São Paulo University Chamber Orchestra) conducted by the composer himself on his first visit to Brazil.

Thiago Abdalla joined the group in 2010. Estampas was released on 2010 and Jequibau in 2012. In 2013, Quaternaglia recorded a live "Concerto Italico", by Leo Brouwer, with Havana Chamber Orchestra conducted by the composer. Brouwer's concerts for four guitars and orchestra were also performed in Belém, Aracaju, Rio de Janeiro and at Sala São Paulo with Heliopolis Symphony Orchestra conducted by Isaac Karabtchevsky. The CD Xangô was released in 2015 with works by Villa-Lobos, Almeida Prado, Ronaldo Miranda, João Luiz, Sérgio Molina, Chrystian Dozza and Paulo Bellinati.

Four (2019) is the quartet’s first album released by GuitarCoop, Brazilian platform and record label that has risen to worldwide prominence for producing and distributing high quality classical guitar content (in audio and video) on the web. Sidney Molina explains that the “album is the culmination of an ample renovation in the group’s repertoire undertaken after the celebration of its 25th anniversary, in 2017”. Contrary to Quaternaglia’s previous albums, in Four there is an “intentional absence” of pieces by Brazilian composers.

The title Four points to the four composers featured in the CD – Leonard Bernstein (USA), Leo Brouwer (Cuba), Javier Farias (Chile) and Astor Piazzolla (Argentina) – the four works chosen for recording, as well as the four guitars of the ensemble.

In 2022 Quaternaglia launched two new albums: Down the Black River, with works for four guitars, piano and orchestra written by Sergio Molina, and Bellinati’s Mosaic, which includes the compositions for guitar quartet by Paulo Bellinati and the first recording of a piece dedicated to the group by Sergio Assad.

== Quartet members ==
- 1992-1993 Sidney Molina, Daniel Clementi, Eduardo Fleury, Breno Chaves (replaced Guilherme de Camargo after 2 concerts)
- 1993-1999 Sidney Molina, Fabio Ramazzina, Eduardo Fleury, Breno Chaves
- 1999-2002 Sidney Molina, Fabio Ramazzina, Eduardo Fleury, Paulo Porto Alegre
- 2002-2007 Sidney Molina, Fabio Ramazzina, João Luiz, Fernando Lima
- 2007-2010 Sidney Molina, Paola Picherzky, Fabio Ramazzina, João Luiz (Chrystian Dozza since 2009)
- 2010–present Sidney Molina, Thiago Abdalla, Fabio Ramazzina, Chrystian Dozza

== Discography ==
- Bellinati's Mosaic (Guitarcoop, 2022)
- Down the Black River (Guitarcoop, 2022)
- Four (Guitarcoop, 2019)
- Xangô (Tratore, 2015)
- Jequibau[1] (Tratore, 2012)
- Estampas (Miramontes/ Tratore, 2010)
- Presença (Paulus Music, 2004)
- Forrobodó (Carmo/ECM, 2000)
- Antique (Paulinas Comep, 1996)
- Quaternaglia (JHO, 1995)

== Invited appearances ==
- "No Frontiers", by Chrystian Dozza (2020)
- Mitología de la Aguas - live with Havana Chamber Orchestra conducted by Leo Brouwer (Espiral Eterna, 2014)
- Movimento Violão - live (2011)
- Guitare Du XXI ème Siècle - Éric Pénicaud (Quantum, 2010)
- 10 Anos de Violão Intercâmbio - (GTR, 2004)
- Rumos Musicais live – (Itaú Cultural, 1999)
- Universo Sonoro - Lina Pires de Campos (Régia Música, 1998)

== DVD ==
- Quaternaglia – live (Itaú Cultural/Eldorado, 2006)
