= Guitar Foundation of America =

American classical guitar organization

- Abbreviation: GFA
- Formation: 1973
- Type: 501(c)(3)
- Purpose: "The Guitar Foundation of America inspires artistry, builds community, and promotes the classical guitar internationally through excellence in performance, literature, education and research."
- Location: Palos Verdes Peninsula, California
- Services: Guitar lessons, guitar shop, competitions, concerts
- Key people: Martha Masters (president); Brian Head (artistic director); Sherwin Servande (vice president); Pam Gerken (vice president, treasurer); Robert Lane (vice president, secretary)
- Website: guitarfoundation.org

The Guitar Foundation of America (GFA) is an American classical guitar nonprofit organization that was founded in 1973 at the National Guitar Convention sponsored by the American String Teachers Association. The foundation offers various services ranging from guitar lessons to a guitar shop, competitions, and events. The foundation relies on donations, events, and advertising on its web site for funding. The foundation publishes Soundboard Scholar, a peer-reviewed journal, and Prodigies, a magazine for children.

== History ==
In 1968 the foundation's founder, Thomas Heck, was living in Vienna, Austria, collecting rare sheet music for guitar. His collection included first editions by Mauro Giuliani. In 1973, Heck wrote the foundation's articles of incorporation in Santa Barbara, California, creating a non-profit foundation to which he could give his archive of sheet music. Along with Heck, others were interested in forming the first national classical guitar association in the United States, including Vahdah Olcott-Bickford, who served on the first GFA Board of Directors, and Ron Purcell, the GFA's first president.

Heck created the GFA archive in 1977 in Milwaukee while teaching at the Wisconsin Conservatory of Music. A catalog of the inventory was assembled and mailed to interested buyers, who could receive photocopies of sheet music on request. A second edition of the catalog was published four years later. During the 1980s, while Heck taught at Ohio State University in Columbus, the archive grew to include more sheet music, periodicals, and other materials related to classical guitar. In the 1990s the archive moved to the University of Akron, and in 2015 it was transferred to California State University, Northridge.

== International Concert Artist Competition ==
The foundation holds an International Convention and Competition. The International Concert Artist Competition gives the following prizes to the winner: a recording contract with Naxos, publishing contract, cash, and an international tour.

The first competition was held in 1982. Twenty-three guitarists entered the contest, and there were four finalists. To qualify as finalists, guitarists were required to play three pieces selected by the jurors. Michael Chapdelaine won the first contest, while Adam Holzman won in 1983. Holzman's repertoire included the Fourth Lute Suite by J. S. Bach and Sevilla by Albeniz.

=== Winners ===
Source Official webpage

Year	Winner	Country	Location
1982	Michael Chapdelaine	US	Denver, Colorado, US
1983	Adam Holzman	US	Quebec, Canada
1985	Mary Akerman	US	Fullerton, California, US
1986	Peter Clemente	US	Milwaukee, Wisconsin, US
1987	Ricardo Cobo	Colombia	Tempe, Arizona, US
1988	Olivier Chassain	France	Akron, Ohio, US
1989	Marc Teicholz	US	Lubbock, Texas, US
1990	Joseph Hagedorn	US	Pasadena, California, US
1991	Alexei Zimakov	Russia	Miami, Florida, US
1992	Jason Vieaux	US	New Orleans, Louisiana, US
1993	Kevin Gallagher	US	Buffalo, New York, US
1994	Margarita Escarpa	Spain	Quebec, Canada
1995	Antigoni Goni	Greece	Northridge, California, US
1996	Fabio Zanon	Brazil	St. Louis, Missouri, US
1997	Judicael Perroy	France	La Jolla, California, US
1998	Denis Azabagic	Bosnia	Montreal, Canada
1999	Lorenzo Micheli	Italy	Charleston, South Carolina, US
2000	Martha Masters	US	San Antonio, Texas, US
2001	Johan Fostier	Belgium	La Jolla, California, US
2002	Dimitri Illarionov	Russia	Miami, Florida, US
2003	Jérémy Jouve	France	Mérida, Yucatán, Mexico
2004	Goran Krivokapić	Montenegro	Montreal, Canada
2005	Jerome Ducharme	Canada	Oberlin, Ohio, US
2006	Thomas Viloteau	France	Columbus, Georgia, US
2007	Marcin Dylla	Poland	Los Angeles, California, US
2008	Gabriel Bianco	France	San Francisco, California, US
2009	Florian Larousse	France	Ithaca, New York, US
2010	Johannes Möller	Sweden	Austin, Texas, US
2011	Vladimir Gorbach	Russia	Columbus, Georgia, US
2012	Rovshan Mamedkuliev	Russia	Charleston, South Carolina, US
2013	Anton Baranov	Russia	Louisville, Kentucky, US
2014	Ekachai Jearakul	Thailand	Fullerton, California, US
2015	Thibaut Garcia	France	Oklahoma City, OK, US
2016	Xavier Jara	US	Denver, CO, US
2017	Tengyue Zhang	China	Fullerton, CA, US
2018	Raphaël Feuillâtre	France	Louisville, Kentucky, US
2019	Johan Smith	Switzerland	Miami, Florida, US
2021	Bokyung Byun	South Korea	Los Angeles, US
2022	Lovro Peretić	Croatia	Indianapolis, IN, US
2023	Marko Topchii	Ukraine	New York, NY, US
2024	Leonela Alejandro	Puerto Rico	Fullerton, CA, US
2025	Virgile Barthe	France	Louisville, Kentucky, US
2026	Eric Wang	US	Denver, CO, US
