= International Guitar Research Archive =

Guitar music archive in the United States

The International Guitar Research Archive (IGRA) is a specialized research collection housed in the University Library at California State University, Northridge (CSUN), dedicated to the guitar and related plucked string instruments. The archive supports scholarly research and performance in classical, jazz, and folk guitar traditions by providing access to rare scores, personal papers, historic instruments, and recordings.

== History ==
The origins of the IGRA trace back to the extensive private collection of Vahdah Olcott-Bickford, an award-winning classical guitarist and influential teacher who helped found the American Guitar Society in 1923. Known as the "grand lady of the guitar," Olcott-Bickford assembled a large collection of guitar music, correspondence, journals, and instruments.

After her death in 1980, her widower, Robert Revere, arranged for the collection to be donated to CSUN in 1987. The move followed years of legal and logistical challenges, including damage to Olcott-Bickford's Hollywood Hills home in the 1971 Sylmar earthquake and theft of some rare items while in storage.

CSUN music professor Ron Purcell, a former student of Olcott-Bickford, was an early proponent of establishing and growing the archive. Purcell helped obtain additional collections and grants for the archive, including support from the Augustine Foundation.

== Collections and scope ==
IGRA houses over 15,000 pieces of guitar music, thousands of letters, journals, photographs, and rare instruments. The collection includes works and personal materials from well-known guitarists such as:

- Andrés Segovia
- Laurindo Almeida
- Vahdah Olcott-Bickford
- Reginald Smith Brindle
- Vicente Gomez

Among the many items in the archive are 19th- and 20th-century sheet music, handwritten scores, sound recordings, and guitars dating as far back as 1790. In addition, IGRA holds the institutional archives of the Guitar Foundation of America. and the American Guitar Society.

== Public programs and exhibitions ==
The IGRA has been featured in several public exhibitions at CSUN's University Library. Exhibits have included:

- "Historical Vibrations" (2005), which showcased rare guitars and memorabilia, including an instrument signed by Hollywood stars and used by Almeida on film soundtracks.
- The 2005 public debut of the archive, which featured guitars from the 16th to 21st centuries and performances by faculty and students.

The archive also sponsors events such as master classes, including one in 1999 with classical guitarist Christopher Parkening.

== Grants and fellowships ==
In 2008, the Augustine Foundation awarded the archive a $30,000 grant for conservation and cataloging. An earlier grant supported digitization of part of the collection.

Since 2013, the IGRA archive and the Ronald and Beth Purcell Endowment have supported an annual student fellowship at the CSUN University Library in Special Collections and Archives.
