= Thomas Viloteau =

French classical guitarist

Thomas Viloteau (born 1985) is a French classical guitarist.

== Life and career ==
Viloteau began his studies at the age of 12 in Port-Saint-Louis-du-Rhône in southern France. From 1998, Viloteau continued his studies at the Escuela de Música Juan Pedro Carrero in Barcelona, Spain. Here he studied under Maité Rubio while taking additional master classes with Álvaro Pierri. In 2000, Viloteau entered the Conservatorio Superior de Música de Barcelona where he studied with Joan Furió. Returning to France in 2001, Viloteau entered the École Normale Supérieure in Paris after receiving the Fondation Zigmund Zaleski Scholarship. Here he studied under the guidance of Alberto Ponce and graduated in 2004 with a Diplôme Supérieur de Concertiste. Remaining in Paris, Viloteau entered the Conservatoire National Supérieur de Musique de Paris in 2004, where he studied with Roland Dyens and worked privately with Judicaël Perroy. In 2009, Viloteau received the Milton Salkin Scholarship Fund to attend the San Francisco Conservatory of Music where he graduated with a Professional Studies Diploma after studying with professor Marc Teicholz for a year. After living in New York City and London, he graduated in 2012 with a master's degree in Guitar Performance from the University of Arizona in Tucson, as a Teaching Assistant for Tom Patterson. In Arizona he was able to commission the Suite Brasileira 3 by Sergio Assad after winning a grant from the Northern Trust/Piper Enrichment Award in Phoenix. After spending a year in Montreal studying film scoring at the University of Montréal, he moved to Rochester, NY in 2014 to complete a Doctor of Musical Arts degree at the Eastman School of Music under the guidance of Nicholas Goluses, with a minor in early music studying baroque performance practice with Paul O'Dette. While a student at Eastman, he was the first guitarist ever to be awarded the Arthur W. Foote Award from the Harvard Musical Association in Boston, and in 2017 he was selected to be an artist in residence for the American Public Media radio show Performance Today.

Viloteau is currently playing a 2006 Greg Smallman guitar and a 2013 Bastien Burlot guitar and is endorsed by Savarez strings.

== Publications ==
- Dans la Boîte Noire - Technique(s) de la Guitare Classique (2013)
- In the Black Box - Technique(s) of the Classical Guitar (2014)
- Cinq Sonates - Domenico Scarlatti, co-edited with Gabriel Bianco (2015, Editions l'Empreinte Mélodique)
- Suite Brasileira 3 - Sergio Assad, edited and fingered by Thomas Viloteau, (2015 Editions Doberman-Yppan)

== Competitions ==
Thomas Viloteau has competed and placed first in several international guitar competitions:

- in Spain

Salou Guitar Competition (2000)
Segovia International Competition in Linares, Spain (2005)
International Tárrega Guitar Competition (2012)

- in France

Antony Competition(2005)

- in Italy

Mottola Competition (2006)

- in the USA

Guitar Foundation of America (2006).

== Performances ==
Along with his education and competitions, Viloteau has performed as a soloist in Italy, Spain, Sweden, France, Germany and Taiwan. In 2007, Viloteau toured for seven months in the United States, Canada and Mexico, where he played and taught numerous concerts and masterclasses. His biggest venue in the United States was the Kennedy Center, when he was chosen to represent the San Francisco Conservatory of Music in 2009.

== Recordings ==
In addition to a number of performance and instructional videos, Viloteau has recorded the following CDs and DVD.

- Guitar Recital, 2007 Naxos
- Thomas Viloteau, GFA Winner, 2010 MelBay (DVD)
- Romantic, 2013 La Ma de Guido
- Dances Through the Centuries, 2015 Tigado
- A Song and Dance, 2016 Tigado
