= Vladimir Gorbach =

- Born: January 31, 1981 (age 45); Novosibirsk, Russia
- Genres: Classical music
- Occupation: Guitarist
- Instrument: Guitar
- Label: Naxos
- Website: www.vladimirgorbach.com

Vladimir Gorbach (Russian: Владимир Горбач; born January 31, 1981, in Novosibirsk, Russia) is a Russian classical guitarist.

== Biography ==
Vladimir Gorbach was born in Novosibirsk and began his guitar lessons at an early age in the class of Professor Yuri Kuzin at the State Music School in Novosibirsk and later with Arkady Burkhanov at the Glinka Conservatory.

He later left Russia to complete his Bachelor and master's degrees at the Conservatory for Music and Dance in Cologne, Germany under the tutelage of internationally renowned concert artists and pedagogues Roberto Aussel and Carlo Marchione.

In 2013 he began doctoral studies at the University of Southern California, Thornton School of Music as a first International Artist Fellow in Music. He then completed the Doctor of Musical Arts degree as a student of Grammy Award-winning classical guitar professor William Kanengiser, a founding member of the Los Angeles Guitar Quartet. Gorbach also had been appointed to the faculty of the Classical Guitar Department at California State University, Fullerton

In 2015 he moved to Sydney to teach at the Sydney Conservatorium of Music, Australia, where he leads the guitar department.

== Music career ==
Gorbach has been performing internationally for most of his life. His international success began in Germany where he was selected as a soloist for the Yehudi Menuhin Foundation "Live Music Now" outreach program. He then has performed on the Moscow Philharmonic Concert Series, at the Koblenz International Guitar Festival, Guitar Art Festival Belgrade, Vienna Guitar Forum, Nantes Summer Guitar Academy, Vondelpark Festival and for the Sydney Crow's Nest Concert Cycle. He also has been a soloist with orchestras such as the Orchestra de Las Beiras and Orchestra de Aveiro in Portugal, the Russian Academic Chamber Orchestra Musica Viva, the Symphony Orchestra of New Russia, and Junge Philharmonie Köln.

He has earned first-place awards in 10 of the world's most notable guitar competitions including the Naxos International Guitar Festival and the Guitar Foundation of America (GFA) International Concert Artist Competition.

His GFA Winners Tour included performances in America, Canada, Mexico, South America and China, and a Carnegie Hall debut in February 2013.

He also can be seen regularly serving as an adjudicator and guest artist at many international festivals as well as leading masterclasses and workshops.

He was a member of Duo Cologne with Goran Krivokapić, the 2004 winner of the Guitar Foundation of America International Concert Artist Competition.

Since 2017 he is also a member of The New Zealand Guitar Quartet.

Vladimir Gorbach is an associate professor at the University of Sydney. He has performed concerts such as Creole Encounters with Steve Newsome, composed Cinque forme d'amore, and contributed creatively to The Surge, a national film.

== Works ==
In 2012, he released his solo CD in the Laureate Series of Naxos with works by Scarlatti, Piazzolla, Giuliani, Asencio.

In 2013, he published arrangements of lute music by Giovanni Antonio Terzi with MelBay.

== Recognition ==
He was named among top 12 young guitarists in the world by Gendai Guitar Magazine.

In 2011 he won Guitar Foundation of America Concert Artist Competition, considered by many to be the most prestigious classical guitar competition in the world.
