= Symphonic Concerto (Furtwängler) =

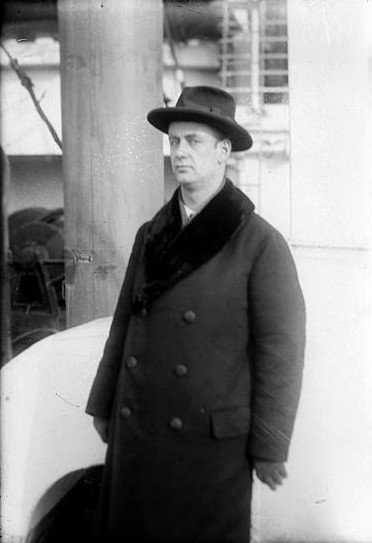
Wilhelm Furtwängler in 1925

The Symphonic Concerto for piano and orchestra in B minor by Wilhelm Furtwängler was composed between 1924 and 1937. Its world premiere took place in Munich on 26 October 1937, with Edwin Fischer as soloist; Furtwängler conducted the Berlin Philharmonic Orchestra. In January 1939 there was a radio broadcast which has survived as the only complete recording of the original version of the concerto.

The work is cast into three movements: The first (Schwer, pesante in B minor) is an extensive sonata form movement of more than 30 minutes duration. A second movement follows, an Adagio solenne in D major influenced by Bruckner and Brahms; and lasting approximately 11 minutes. The last movement (Allegro moderato) is composed in free-form and has some hints of a rondo. Its duration is about 20 minutes and the work concludes in dark and gloomy mood with pianissimo dynamics.

As a result of its ambivalent reception and technical difficulty, Furtwängler's Symphonic Concerto has rarely been performed in public. Extensive revisions were made to the score prior to its publication by Brucknerverlag of Wiesbaden in 1954. This is the version that has been performed since. The concerto has also been published in a critical edition edited by George Alexander Albrecht. The Brucknerverlag also published a two-piano reduction of the score.

Other notable champions of the work have included Paul Badura-Skoda, Daniel Barenboim, Konstantin Scherbakov, Gerhard Oppitz, Erik Then-Bergh, Gergely Boganyi, Dagmar Bella, Walter Prossnitz, Johannes Bork, Homero Francesch, Hirokuni Ishikawa, Takahiro Sonoda, András Schiff, David Lively, and Stephan Möller.
