= Thibaut Garcia =

French classical guitarist

Thibaut Garcia (born 26 May 1994, Toulouse, France) is a French classical guitarist.

== Early life and education ==
Garcia, whose Spanish origins have influenced his style, began playing the guitar at the age of seven.

== Awards ==
In 2015 Garcia was awarded the 1st prize of the Guitar Foundation of America 2015.

Garcia has performed for the French TV show la boîte à musique on France 2 (French Television), invited by the musician Jean-François Zygel and performed on France Musique in December 2015 in Gaëlle Le Gallic's program. He received the Prix Filleul 2015 of the Académie Charles Cros.

== Discography ==
- Demain dès l’aube (Contrastes Records / Naxos, 2014)
- Leyendas (Erato / Warner Classics, 2016)
- "Bach Inspirations" (Erato / Warner Classics, 2018)
- Aranjuez (Erato / Warner Classics, 2020)
- À sa guitare (with Philippe Jaroussky; Erato / Warner Classics, 2021)
- El Bohemio: Agustin Barrios (Warner Classics, 2023)
