= Johannes Möller (guitarist) =

Swedish guitarist (born 1981)

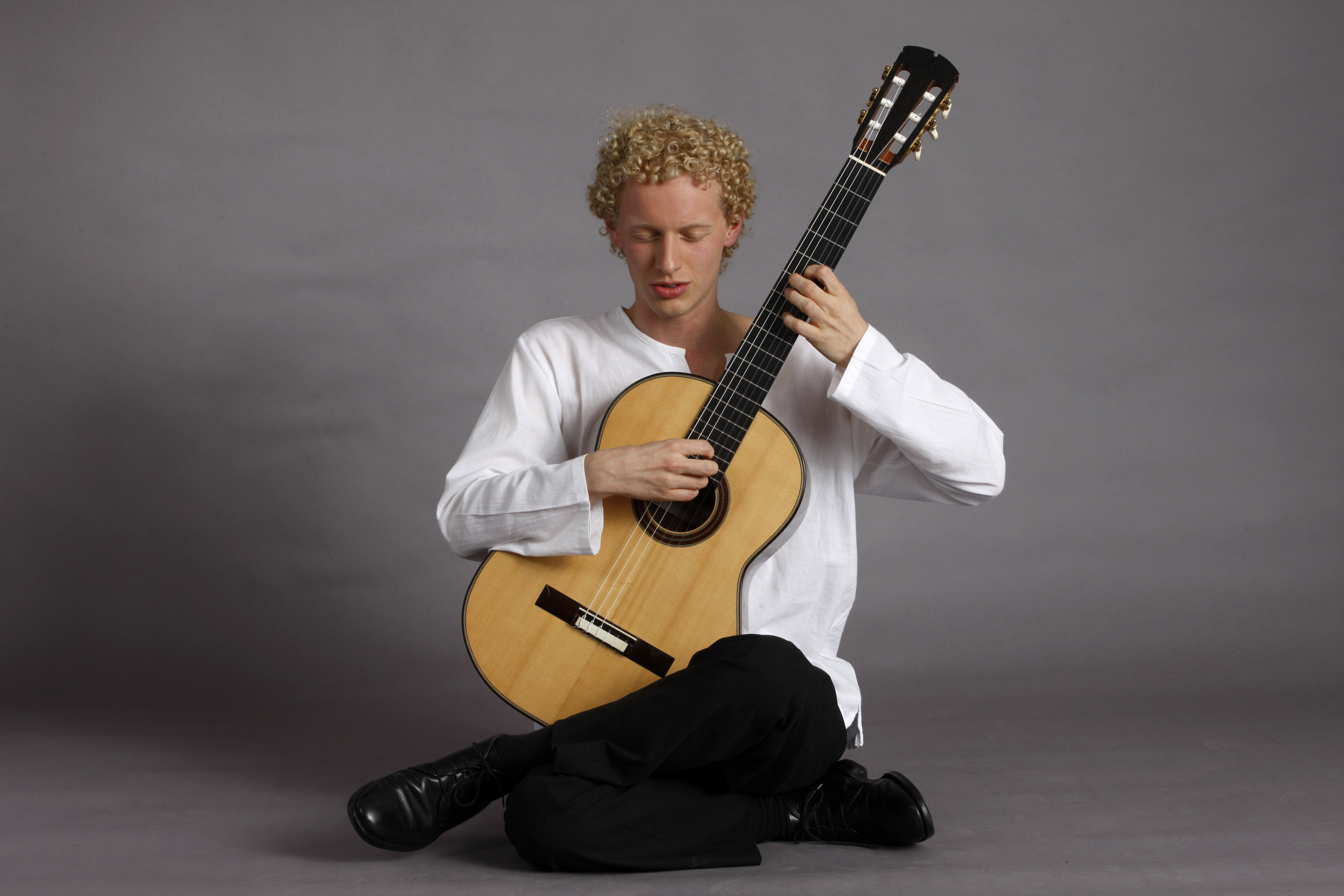
- Johannes Möller in 2004.

Background information
- Born: November 29, 1981 (age 44)
- Genre: Classical
- Occupations: Guitarist and Composer
- Instrument: Classical Guitar
- Years active: 1990s–present
- Website: johannesmoller.com

Johannes Möller (born November 29, 1981) is a Swedish classical guitarist and composer.

== Early life ==
Johannes Möller was born on 29 November 1981 to Swedish parents. His father Mats Möller is a professional flautist and his grandfather was a viola player.

As a young child, Möller would play on the piano in his home creating melodies and would use Blu Tack to put numbers on the keys to indicate the order they should be played. At age 10, he began taking guitar lessons as part of the public music education programme that offered music lessons to all school children in Sweden.

When he was 12, Möller began studying counterpoint, harmony and the art of composition in earnest through textbooks. This resulted in a large quantity of mainly chamber music works for various instruments.

A selection of these works was recorded on a CD with some of the top instrumentalists in his Sweden when he was 14 years old. A critic from the Swedish newspaper Göteborgs-Posten wrote about these compositions, “What is to become of Johannes Möller? A Swedish Mozart – in our time?”

== Education & Competitions ==
Johannes Möller has earned a Bachelor of Music with Honors from the Royal College of Music in London and he has received two Master's degrees from the Royal Conservatoire in The Hague and from the Amsterdam Conservatory.

Identifying more as a musician than purely a guitarist, Möller entered competitions open to all instrumentalists. In 2005 he also became the first guitarist to win The Bromsgrove Festival International Young Musicians Platform (England). He also became the first guitarist ever to win the Ljunggrenska Competition (Sweden) in 2007, the motivation of the jury was: “With the help of a breathtaking technique and all the colors of the rainbow he opens a door to a world of subtle expressions which with great power and intensity strikes us.” In 2008 he won the Dutch Vriendenkrans Concours where he was competing against performers in all of the instrumental categories. As a part of this award his name has been engraved on a metal plate that can be seen in the Concertgebouw in Amsterdam. In 2009, he won the European Guitar Award for his guitar solo compositions.

In 2010 he was awarded first prize in the Guitar Foundation of America's International Concert Artist Competition.

== Performance career ==
Möller played his first public concerts when he was 13 years old. Since then he has widely toured the world with appearances in Europe, South and North America. These include performances at the Purcell Room in London, Carnegie Hall in New York (USA), the Concertgebouw in Amsterdam, as well as a live performance for the BBC 3 in England.

From 2015, for three years he worked closely with the guitar manufacturer Martinez as their global brand ambassador promoting their instruments in all his appearances.

Since 2018 Johannes Möller is the Cultural Ambassador of Zheng'An Guitar City (Zheng'An Industrial Guitar Park) in Guizhou, China.

== Composer ==
As a composer, Möller is said to have found his personal voice with his piece, When the Winds Dissolve, for alto flute and guitar in 2006. His compositions feature on his Mel Bay DVD (Johannes Moller - GFA Winner 2010) and Naxos Guitar Laureate CD. From that time, Möller has been engaged in actively writing and recording his own works.

In 2016, Möller released a CD called ‘India’ of original works based on Indian sounds and ragas. His album China (2017), contains arrangements of Chinese traditional songs, a transcription of the traditional Pipa composition “Moonlit Night on Spring River” and Johannes Möller’s own “Five Chinese Impressions''. The Eternal Dream (2018) is a personal album with genre blending compositions. The more recent Chinese Memories Vol. 1 and The Guitar City contain arrangements of modern Chinese folk songs and his own works.

Möllers compositions are increasingly performed by professional guitarists in concert recitals. The American guitarist Matthew Fish has recorded an album From Her Source to the Sea (2016) featuring only compositions by Johannes Möller.

== Selected discography ==
Year	Album
1996	Johannes V. Möller: Chamber Music, Nosag
1998	Duo 2X Möller, Nosag
1999	Duo 2X Möller LIVE, Nosag
2003	Duo 2XM, SFZ
2003	Schubert & Giuliani, SFZ
2005	Johannes Möller plays Spanish music, SFZ
2010	When the Winds Dissolve, SFZ
2010	Johannes Möller Naxos Guitar Laureate, Naxos
2015	Johann Kaspar Mertz Guitar Duets, Naxos
2016	India
2017	China
2018	The Eternal Dream
2019	Chinese Memories Vol. 1
2019	Evocations
2020	The Guitar City
