= Bucharest Symphony Orchestra =

Romanian orchestra

- Orchestra
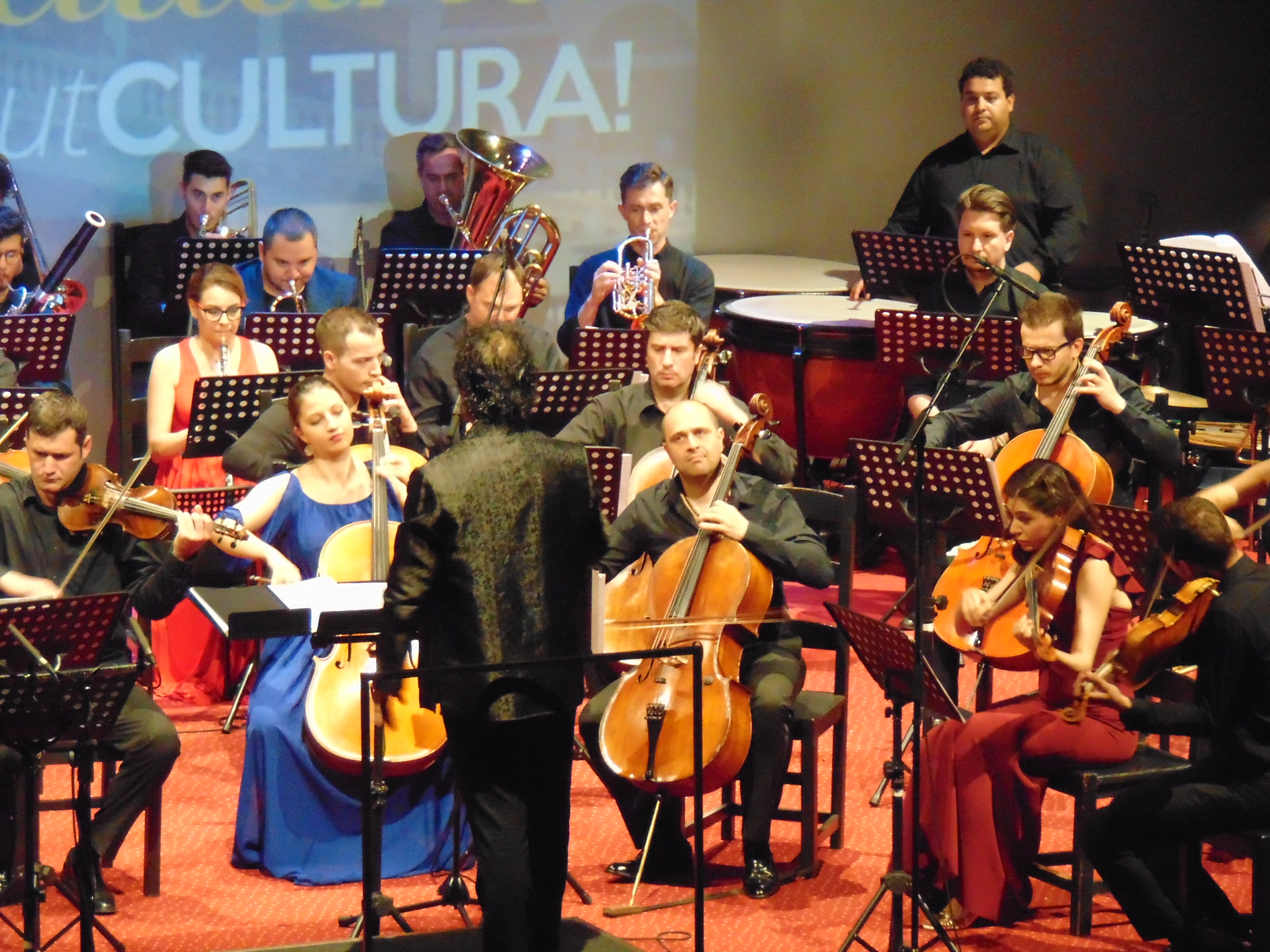
- Jin Wang conducts the Bucharest Symphony Orchestra in SalutCULTURA! 2018 musical season
- Founded: 2006; 19 years ago
- Principal conductor: John Axelrod (September 2022–present)
- Website: www.osb.fan

The Bucharest Symphony Orchestra is a Romanian orchestra based in Bucharest, founded in 2006 by the Philson Young Association. In 2022, John Axelrod was appointed Principal Conductor of the Bucharest Symphony Orchestra. Previously, Jin Wang (2017–2019) and Benoît Fromanger occupied the leading musical position (2011–2017). Between 2006 and 2012, Bucharest Symphony Orchestra performed in concert halls such as the Romanian Athenaeum, National Theatre Bucharest, Romanian National Opera and Sala Palatului.

== History ==
- December 14, 2010 – Bucharest Symphony Orchestra performed in the All Stars Christmas Show
- Bucharest Symphony Orchestra Reviews and Photos from All Stars Christmas
- Bucharest Symphony Orchestra featuring Smiley, Elena Gheorghe, Cristina Rus in All Stars Christmas Show
- December 30, 2010 – Angela Gheorghiu was celebrated by the Bucharest Symphony Orchestra in her 2010 Anniversary Gala
- March 29, 2011 – Phoenix & Bucharest Symphony Orchestra performed at the Opera
- August 18/19, 2012 – Bucharest Symphony Orchestra performed at Calenzana

== Discography ==
The orchestra's portfolio includes four audio recordings.

- "Mel Bonis" – complete orchestral works, published by Chant de Linos
- "Very Classic" – double CD signed Marcel Pavel – opera arias, chansonnettes and crossover
- "Beethoven – The Titan"
- "Red Mansion Dream" – 2018, composer Erqing Wang
