= Margarita Escarpa =

Spanish classical guitarist

Margarita Escarpa (born 21 August 1964) is a Spanish classical guitarist.

Escarpa was born in Madrid. She studied at the Real Conservatorio Superior de Madrid and is currently on the faculty at the Vigo Conservatory and is a well-known professional in Spain. She is noted for her performances of Bach and chamber music recitals and has performed internationally including in the United States and Mexico.
