= Michael Chapdelaine =

Musical artist (1956-2023)

- Born: September 15, 1956; San Diego, California, U.S.
- Died: November 16, 2023 (aged 67) Denver, Colorado, U.S.
- Genres: Fingerstyle and Classical Guitar
- Instrument: Guitar
- Years active: 1976–2023
- Labels: Delta, Time-Life, Newport Classicas
- Website: www.michaelchapdelaine.com

Michael Chapdelaine (September 15, 1956 – November 16, 2023) was a renowned American classical and fingerstyle guitarist. He is the only guitarist to ever win First Prize in the world's top competitions in both the Classical and Fingerstyle genres. He won the first Guitar Foundation of America International Classical Guitar Competition in 1982 and the National Fingerstyle Championships at the Walnut Valley Bluegrass Festival in Winfield, Kansas in 1998. His performances, played on both steel string and nylon string guitars, included musical styles ranging from blues, to baroque, to country, to rhythm 'n' blues.

Early Life and Career

Chapdelaine was born in San Diego in 1956 and grew up in Florida. He was inspired to play guitar after hearing Cream's "Strange Brew" and subsequently played electric guitar in local rock bands during high school." In 1974 he went to Florida State where he was introduced to classical guitar and studied with Bruce Holzman. He supplemented his studies by attending the Aspen Music Festival in the summers where he studied with Oscar Ghiglia and Eliot Fisk. Chapdelaine received a B.M. in 1979 and a M.M. in 1980 from Florida State.

As a professional classical guitarist in the 1980s Chapdelaine toured four continents while giving hundreds of performances for Affiliate Artists Inc., and various arts promotion organizations. He was the first winner of the Guitar Foundation of America International Classical Guitar Competition in 1982 which led to further exposure. He also won the coveted National Endowment for the Arts Solo Recitalist Grant twice, the Music Teachers National Association's Guitar Competitions and won the silver medal in Venezuela's VIII Concurso International de Guitarra "Alirio Diaz." In 1985 he became the guitar professor at University of New Mexico.

The Segovia Controversy

In 1986 Chapdelaine along with Marcelo Kayath, Scott Tennant and Lily Afshar participated in Andres Segovia's 1986 masterclass held at USC. Chapdelaine's performance of "Mallorca" by Issac Albeniz was considered inappropriate to Segovia's musical taste and Chapdelaine was kicked out of the masterclass on live television. The immediate consequences for Chapdelaine's career were loss of management, loss of performance opportunities and loss of prestige in the classical guitar community. In recent times the video reposted on YouTube has caused many guitar players to re-evaluate Segovia's overly harsh dismissal of students whose aesthetic choices differ from his own taste.

Career Flourishing

In 1989 he recorded his first CD entitled The dbx Reels. In 1992 he recorded the Sonata Romantica CD, (now re-released as "Mexico"), about which Acoustic Guitar magazine (January 1993) wrote "... if I were marooned on a desert island with a limited selection of recordings, this one would be among my choices...I have seldom heard a more beautiful album. Other young guitarists have excellent technique, but few have such style and musicality, and Chapdelaine's beautiful tone is the nearest to Segovia's that I can recall." In 1994 Chapdelaine turned his attention to pop music, by arranging, producing, and recording Time-Life Music's Guitar by Moonlight collection (also released as "with love"), which sold 250,000 copies in its first two years in the stores. In 1998, he won the National Fingerpicking Championships at Winfield.

In the 2000s Chapdelaine's performances of his arrangements on YouTube gave him further exposure with some videos reaching over a million views. He also toured with noted fingerstyle guitarists and wrote instructional articles for Acoustic Guitar Magazine.

Chapdelaine was Professor of Music and Head of Guitar Studies at the University of New Mexico from 1986 until his retirement in 2018. He had previously been on the faculties of the University of Colorado at Denver and Metropolitan State University. He gave master classes throughout the world including, China, Thailand, Malaysia, Peru, Venezuela, Taiwan and Indonesia, at institutions such as the University of Miami, Mannes School of Music, University of Texas, and California State University.

Chapdelaine died on November 16, 2023, at the age of 67.

== Discography ==
- The dbx Reels (1989)
- Mexico (1992)
- Time-Life Music's "with love" (1995)
- Land of Enchantment (1998)
- Spanish Roses (1999)
- Yamaha Sampler (2001)
- Replay (2001)
- Bach Is Cool (2004)
- Guitar for Christmas (2003)
- Portrait de Femme (2005)
- Grapevine Reserve (2005)
- Guitar Man (2008)
- The Somogyi Incident (2014)
- Counterpoint Boundaries, Homage to Michael Hedges (2018)
