= University Library, California State University Northridge =

Academic library at California State University, Northridge

Coordinates: 34.2400°N 118.5295°W

CSUN University Library
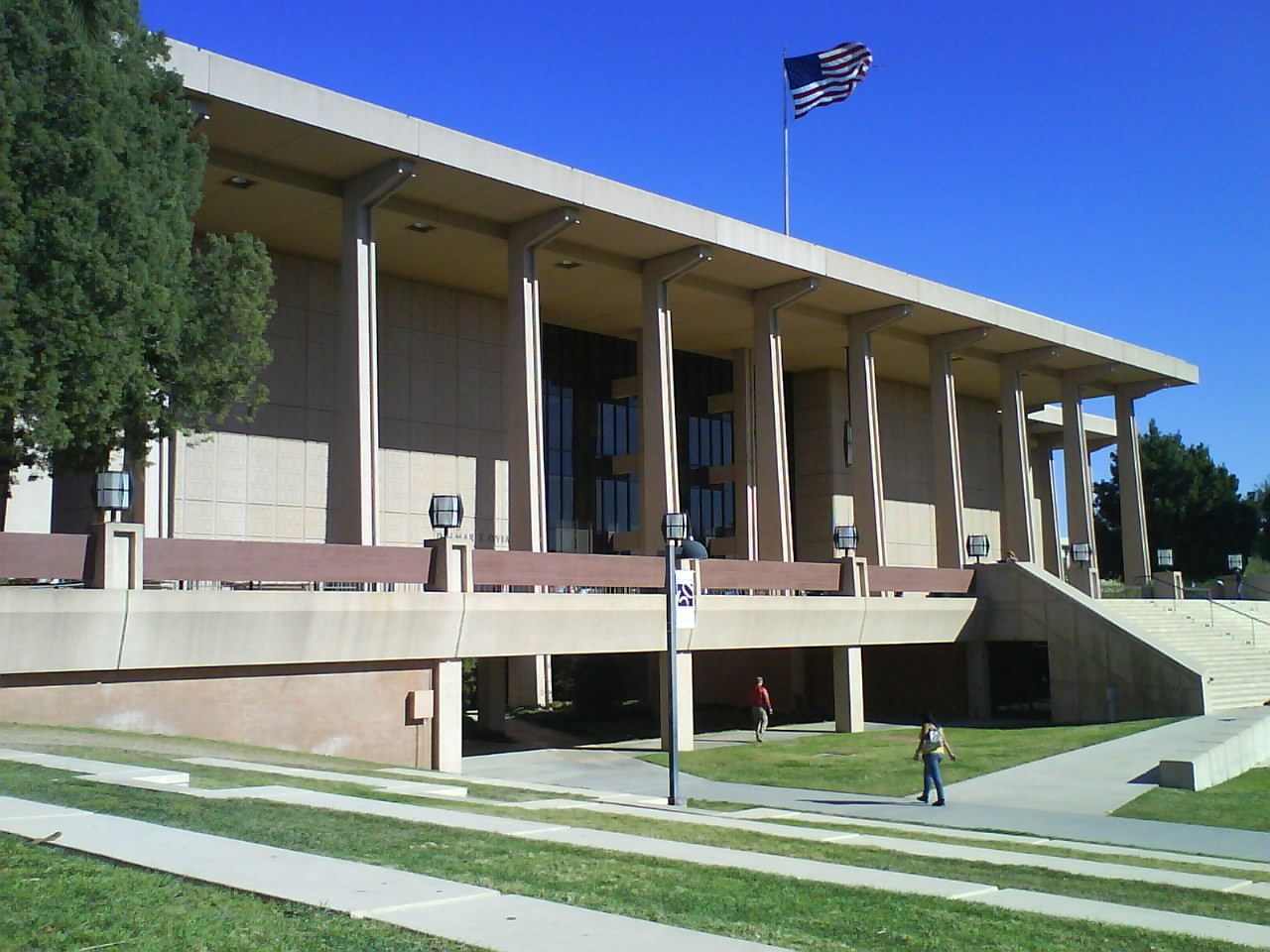
- Location: Northridge, CA
- Type: Academic library
- Established: October 1973

Other information
- Director: Emy Decker – Dean, University Library
- Website: library.csun.edu

The University Library at California State University, Northridge (CSUN) is located in Northridge, in the northern San Fernando Valley in Los Angeles, California.

== History ==
Construction for the original library began on November 14, 1957, marking it as the college's first permanent campus building. Students were permitted to use the building beginning on February 16, 1959, and the library had its official opening on March 3. The library featured four floors, 200,000 books and a capacity of approximately 15,000 people. The library was heavily damaged during the 1971 San Fernando Earthquake, making it necessary for the closure of the upper floors of the library for repair and organization.

Original construction of the University Library was in two phases. The first phase was opened on October 24, 1973. The second, completed in 1991, nearly doubled the size with additional east and west wings. Both phases were designed by the architect Leo A. Daly. The 1994 Northridge Earthquake badly damaged the building forcing the library to close. The original 'phase one building' re-opened later in 1994. The 'second phase wings' needed demolishing and reconstruction, and re-opened in 2000.

The Library maintains its own AS/RS (Automated Storage and Retrieval System), built in 1991, with a capacity of 1.7 million volumes.

== Naming controversy ==
The library was originally named for Delmar T. Oviatt, former vice president for Academic Affairs, who was involved in the founding of San Fernando Valley State College, CSUN's predecessor.

In 2019, CSUN president Dianne F. Harrison appointed a campus committee to investigate whether the Oviatt Library should be renamed due to allegations of racism. In fall 2020, the Oviatt Library Advisory Working Group presented its findings to President Harrison, the Associated Students Senate, and the CSUN Faculty Senate, recommending that the name of Delmar T. Oviatt be removed from the University Library. After approval from CSU Chancellor Timothy White, the name was changed to University Library in December 2020.

== Services and collections ==
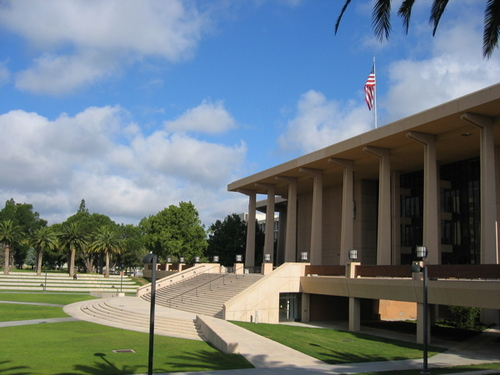
University Library

The University Library has a collection containing over 850,000 print volumes and nearly 1.3 million ebooks. The Library also subscribes to over 200,000 journals and newspapers. A special focus is the San Fernando Valley History Collection digital archives. The Special Collections & Archives section of the University Library has many archival collections of important primary source documents including a large collection of materials on LGBTQ and Human sexuality, along with the Vahdah Olcott-Bickford collection (part of IGRA: the International Guitar Research Archive), the Old China Hands Archive, and the Tom and Ethel Bradley Center vast collection of photographs from diverse communities of color throughout the United States and Latin America. In addition, the Library's Teacher Curriculum Center provides a large circulating collection of curricular materials for education students and local educators.

== Film and television shooting location ==
The University Library has served as a shooting location for numerous films and television series, including Star Trek, Sky High, Buffy the Vampire Slayer, Battlestar Galactica, The Middle, and The Orville. It was also one of the filming locations for the music video Intentions by Justin Bieber.
