= Judicaël Perroy =

French classical guitarist and teacher (born 1973)

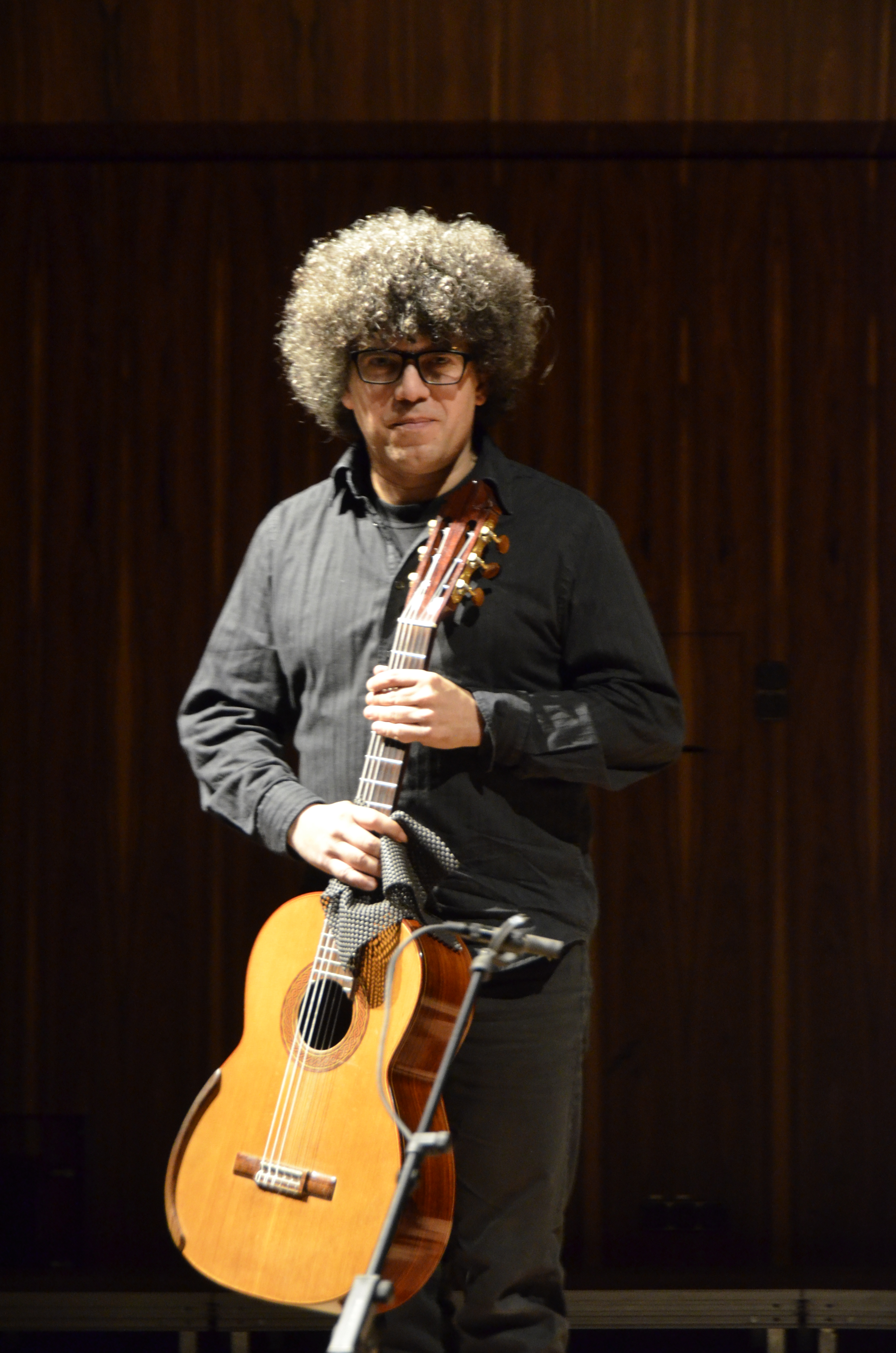
Perroy in 2017.

Judicaël Perroy (born July 21, 1973 in Paris) is a French classical guitarist and music teacher.

== Early life and education ==
Perroy's father played the acoustic guitar when he was a child.

Perroy enrolled in the Conservatoire Municipal Inter-Arrondissements de Paris (Paris Academy of Music) at the age of 7 and started studying classical music, specifically guitar. In 1983, at the age of ten, he enrolled at the National School Academy of Aulnay-sous-Bois, where he was taught by Delia Estrada, Roberto Aussel, and Raymond Gratien. Perroy demonstrated exceptional talent at an early age. At the age of eleven, he performed two Vivaldi concertos at the Theatre du Mans, accompanied by a full orchestra conducted by Andre Girard.

== Career ==
In 1988, at the age of fourteen, Perroy placed second at the International Competition of the Ile-de-France. Later that year, he graduated summa cum laude and was awarded first prize by the academy. He continued his studies with Pablo Márquez and then with Roberto Aussel and Daniel Lavialle. After enrolling in courses in Economics and Mathematics at university, he stopped playing the guitar for two years, from ages 17 to 19. He began to play again a few weeks before the 15th International Guitar Competition René Bartoli and, with encouragement from Raymond Gratien, entered the competition and was awarded the grand prize by the jury, as well as the audience prize.

Perroy earned his License de Concert from the École Normale de Musique de Paris in 1994, after studying with Alberto Ponce. The same year, he won first prize at the 7th International Guitar Competition of Bourg-Madame by audience choice. Two years later, in 1996, he won first prize from the Conservatoire de Paris graduating class. In 1997, he won the Guitar Foundation of America (GFA) International Solo Competition held in La Jolla, California. The prize included a 60-city concert tour of North America in 1998.

Since then, he has traveled internationally as a performer and teacher. Many of his students have won competitions, including three who have won the GFA competition, one of whom is Thomas Viloteau.

== Current academic positions ==
Perroy lives in Paris and has held the title of Professor of Classical Guitar at Pôle Sup'93 Seine-Saint-Denis Île-de-France (Aubervilliers) (2012–present); L'Association de préfiguration du Pôle superieur d'enseignements artistiques (APPSEA) at Lille (Nord-Pas-de-Calais) (2010–present); and L'École Nationale de Musique d'Aulnay-sous-Bois (2004–2016). He was a teacher at the San Francisco Conservatory of Music from 2017 to 2021 and is currently a professor at the Geneva University of Music.

== Discography ==
Perroy's discography mostly consists of music by classical composers (J. S. Bach, Mauro Giuliani, G.F. Handel, Albéniz) but also includes more modern guitar repertoire (Astor Piazzolla, Gerardo Núñez, Nikita Koshkin). His transcription of Bach's partita for keyboard No. 2, BWV 826 in C minor was the first transcription of the piece for classical guitar and was released under the Naxos Records label in 2010 as part of an all-Bach CD.

- Quantum (1998): Paganini, Granados, Albéniz, Dodgson.
- Bayard Musique (new distribution, not reissued): Aspen Suite (2000); Albéniz, Giuliani, Barrios, Nuñez, Piazzolla, Koshkin.
- Mel Bay (1999): Live Recital at Texas Tech University, Lubbock, Texas: Barrios, Piazzolla, Nuñez, Paganini, Giuliani, Bach, Albéniz.
- Bayard Musique (2001): Méditation (flute and guitar) with Florence Bellon: Schubert (arr. Mertz), Vivaldi, Handel, Castérède, Bach,Dowland, Giuliani, Poulenc, Debussy, Ravel.
- Bayard Musique (2002): Méditation (harp and guitar) with Joanna Kozielska: Rodrigo, Pachelbel, Handel, Respighi, Debussy, Bach, Handel, Albinoni, Beethoven, Albéniz.
- Soundset: The Well-tempered Koshkin (2000): In trio with Frank Koonce and Nikita Koshkin.
- Bayard Musique (2008): La Magie de la Guitare: Vivaldi, Bach, Schubert, Paganini, Albéniz, Granados, Rossini, Handel, Giuliani, Barrios, Piazzolla, Nuñez, Koshkin.
- Naxos (2010): J. S. Bach, Transcriptions for Guitar: Partita No. 2, BWV 826; Suite, BWV 997; Prelude, Fugue and Allegro, BWV 998; Concerto, BWV 972.
- Naxos (2014): M.M Ponce, Guitar Music, Vol. 4: Sonatina Meridional; Thème varié et finale (Version 2) [Ed. A. Segovia]
- Diferencias Sobre la Folía de España y Fuga: Variaciónes Sobre un Tema de A. de Cabezón; Thème varié et finale (Version 1); Guitar Sonata No. 2: Andante.
- Contrastes Records (2017): Paris Une Solitude Peuplée: Heitor Villa-Lobos, Scriabin, M.M Ponce, Takemitsu; Sor.
