= David Lively =

French classical pianist of US origin (born 1953)

David Lively (born 27 June 1953) is a French classical pianist of US origin.

== Biography ==
Born in Ironton, Ohio, Lively began his career at the age of 14 playing Khachatourian's Piano Concerto with the St. Louis Symphony.

In 1972 he won fourth place in the Queen Elisabeth Competition. He later participated, as a member of the jury of the same competition, in the 1999, 2003 and 2010 editions.

He currently heads the Saint-Lizier festival in the Ariège department.

He is the Director of the École normale de musique de Paris competitions.

== Discography ==
- César Franck: Complete Chamber music
- Albert Huybrechts: Chamber music
- Joseph Marx: The two concertos at ASV Records
- Philippe Boesmans: Complete work for piano
- Aaron Copland: Work for piano
- Johannes Brahms: Sonata in F minor, Op 5, Ballades Op 10
- Rachmaninov's Piano Concertos in C minor N° 2 and N° 3
- Bach's The Art of Fugue
- Gabriel Fauré: Complete Nocturnes
- Furtwängler's Piano Concerto
- Liszt's Piano Concerto No. 1, Hungarian Fantasy
- Ravel's Le Tombeau de Couperin, Stravinski's Petrushka (ballet), Tango, Piano-Rag-Music at Deutsch Grammophon
