= Éric Franceries =

French classical guitarist

Éric Franceries is a French classical guitarist.

An international guitarist, he performs in concert as soloist as well as in chamber music, from Japan to the United States, passing through all the countries of Europe. Alexandre Lagoya said of him: "Éric Franceries masters his art with sensitivity. He has always been a performer who knew how to combine his technical possibilities in the service of a high musical spirituality. Eric Franceries crosses the generations and the borders of the six strings, becoming over the years the crossroads of the classic..." (Guitarist Classic Acoustic, special edition n° 5).

As of 2018, Franceries is a classical guitar teacher at the CRD (Conservatoire à Rayonnement Départemental) of Villeurbanne.

He also plays Argentine tango with the bandoneonist Jérémy Vannereau in the "Duo Buenos Aires", and experiments with a repertoire of world music within the "PepperCelt" ensemble, with the violinist-singer Pierrem Thinet and percussionist Baptiste Romano.

== Awards ==
- Victoires de la musique 1994, with Claude Bolling and Jean-Pierre Rampal
- For the guitar he obtained a gold medal at the Toulouse conservatory
- For the bassoon he won a gold medal at the conservatoire de Lyon
- First prize of the Conservatoire de Paris, in Alexandre Lagoya's class.
