= Arnaud Dumond =

French classical guitarist, composer and teacher

Arnaud Dumond is a French classical guitarist, composer and teacher.

== Training ==
After having started in music as a self-taught musician, he undertook and completed higher education in classical guitar at the École Normale de Musique de Paris under the direction of Alberto Ponce. He attended the summer internships by Emilio Pujol and Narciso Yepes in Spain, John Williams in England, then benefited from the advice of Joseph Urshalmi whom he met on tour in Israel.

He attended the analysis classes of Jean-Pierre Guézec, Maurice Ohana and Nadia Boulanger, who invited him to come and play at the American Conservatory of Fontainebleau, then to teach there under the direction of Narcís Bonet.
