= Gabriel Bianco =

French classical guitarist

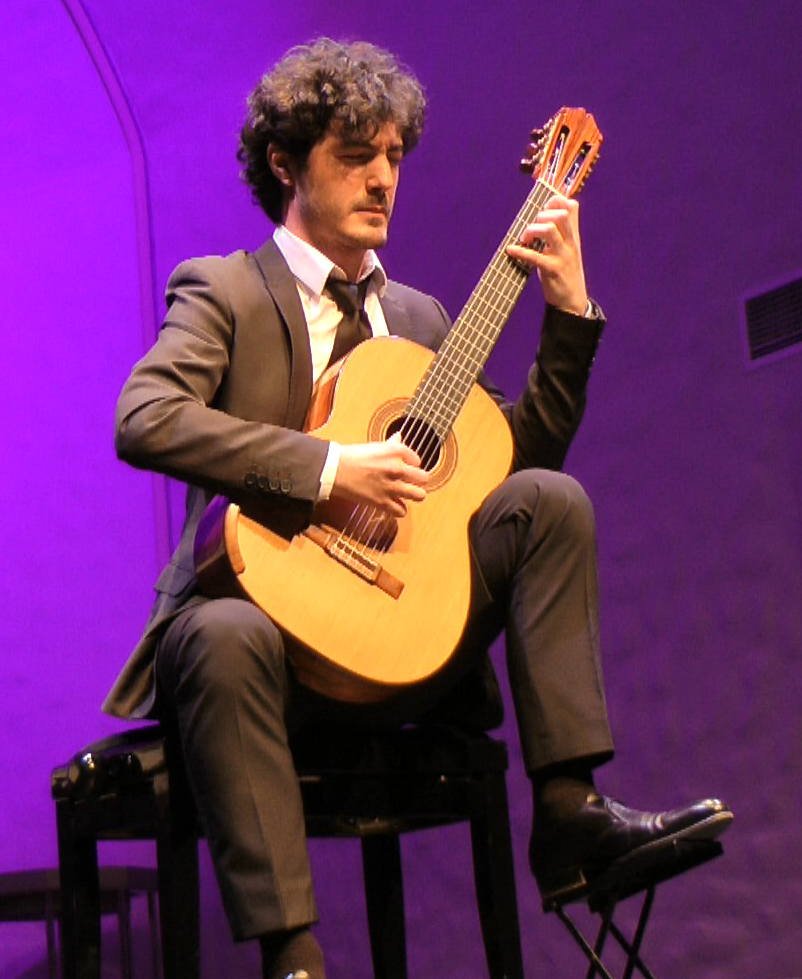
Gabriel Bianco

Gabriel Bianco (born 25 April 1988) is a French classical guitarist.

== Life ==
Born in the 17th arrondissement of Paris in a family of musicians, he started playing the guitar at the age of 5 with his father. He entered the Conservatoire de Paris in 1997. At the age of 12, he recorded on the mezzo channel for the "Musiciens en herbe" program. In 2002, he participated in a play with the Théâtre fragile company. At 15, he gave his first recital.

In 2005, he also participated in the creation of contemporary works (Alma Sola). The same year, he returned to the Conservatoire de Paris (CNSMDP) where he gained notoriety. He gives many concerts in Europe and elsewhere.

On June 2, 2008, he received the first prize of the CNSMDP, mention very well unanimously with the congratulations of the jury, on the occasion of the prize recital. In August 2008, he recorded a CD for Naxos Records and toured America the following year.

In 2012, with Benjamin Valette, Pierre Lelievre, and Arkaitz Chambionnet, he founded the classical guitar quartet Éclisses which the following year won the first prize of the FNAPEC.

== Competition Prizes ==
Bianco passed ten international competitions and won 7 first prizes and 3 second prizes:

- 1st prizes:
  - International guitar competition of Sernancelhe, Portugal, 2005
  - International guitar competition of the Île de Ré, France, 2006
  - International guitar competition of Vienna (Forum Gitarre Wien), Austria; 2006
  - International guitar competition of Tychy (Śląska Jesień Gitarowa), Poland; 2006
  - International guitar competition of Coblence (Koblenz guitar festival), Germany, 2007
  - International Robert-Jean Vidal guitar competition, Barbezieux-Saint-Hilaire, France, 2007.
  - International guitar competition of the GFA (Guitar Foundation of America), USA, 2008
