= Adam Holzman (guitarist) =

Musical artist (born 1960)

- Born: 1960 (age 65–66); New York City, U.S.
- Genre: Classical
- Occupations: Musician, teacher
- Instrument: Classical guitar
- Years active: 1978–present
- Labels: HRH, Naxos
- Website: www.adamholzman.net

Adam Holzman (born 1960 in New York City) is a classical guitarist. He is Professor of Guitar at the University of Texas at Austin and is the Parker C. Fielder Regents Professor in Music. Formerly he was associate professor at the University of South Florida in Tampa. In 1989 he joined the faculty and the University of Texas at Austin Sarah and Ernest Butler School of Music where he founded its classical guitar studio. In 1990 he founded the Austin Guitar Society. In 2017, he founded The Brevard Music Center Summer Festival Guitar Program.

Holzman held the title of "Maestro Extraordinario" given by the Universidad Autonoma de Nuevo Leon, Monterrey, Mexico, where he served as artist-in-residence until 1992.

His teachers include Albert Blain, Bruce Holzman, Eliot Fisk, Andrés Segovia and Oscar Ghiglia. He was chosen twice as a student in the US master classes of Andrés Segovia. He has numerous CD releases on Naxos Records and HRH Records.
