= American Guitar Society =

American classical guitar organization

- Abbreviation: AGS
- Formation: 1923
- Purpose: "The purpose of the AGS is to promote the beauty of the classical guitar via education, scholarships, concerts, and monthly meetings where members perform."
- Location: Chatsworth, California
- Services: Education, scholarship, concerts, meetings
- Website: americanguitarsociety.org

The American Guitar Society or The American Guitar Society, Inc. was founded by Vahdah Olcott-Bickford in 1923. The purpose of the society is to promote the classical guitar thru education, scholarships, concerts, and meetings.

== History ==
The American Guitar Society (AGS), the first organization of its kind in the United States, was founded in 1923 by Valdah Olcott-Bickford and other guitar enthusiasts. Originally called the Los Angeles Guitar Society, (Note: Noonan states that the AGS was formed in 1924, not 1923, but this is likely because the Los Angeles Guitar Society was the original name of the association, and it was not until 1924 that it officially became the American Guitar Society. See Noonan, 2008.) it was sustained for over five decades under the leadership of Olcott-Bickford, who served as its musical director and operations manager until her death in 1980.

The creation of the first American guitar society marked a departure from the prevailing BMG movement (Banjo, Mandolin, and Guitar) by uniting its members and supporters around one goal: to encourage and advance the study and performance of classical guitar. This approach laid the groundwork for future guitar societies, many of which emerged after 1930.

While AGS was the first society of its kind that came to fruition, Gertrude Miller, a guitar columnist in the early 20th century, had made an earlier unsuccessful attempt in 1906 to form a similar organization.

In 1923, Olcott-Bickford was appointed as the AGS's first musical director, making her the first woman to lead a mixed-gender guitar ensemble in the BMG tradition. She directed rehearsals and concerts, selected and arranged repertoire, and oversaw hundreds of themed programs that introduced members to historical, modern, and international guitar music. Olcott-Bickford also managed the AGS's publication fund, which between 1925 and 1963 issued twenty anthologies of guitar music distributed to members worldwide. She volunteered her time and resources throughout her life, ensuring the Society’s continuity and influence in American classical guitar.

In the 1950s, the AGS held monthly meetings that combined performance, education, and community. Gatherings were typically hosted in the homes of members and supporters, with announcements sent by postcard and formal attire expected. Each meeting followed a carefully chosen theme—such as folk music, contemporary works, or tributes to individual composers—and the program adhered strictly to it. Performances featured students, AGS members, and frequently Olcott-Bickford herself, who along with her first husband, Zahr Bickford, often contributed multiple pieces and ensemble performances. The meetings also fostered an informal atmosphere, where, after the formal program concluded, coffee and pastries were served and impromptu performances would take place. Through this blend of structure and spontaneity, the AGS promoted musical discipline, historical awareness, and camaraderie among guitarists.

AGS continued to exist and thrive after Olcott-Bickford's death in 1980, providing scholarships, sponsoring concerts, and providing its membership with an organizational structure for the study and practice of the guitar. It is the oldest continuously active guitar association in the world.

== Legacy ==
The archives of the American Guitar Society are preserved as part of the Vahdah Olcott-Bickford Collection in Special Collections and Archives at the University Library at California State University, Northridge. The materials are housed in "Series V: American Guitar Society Files, 1924–1980."
