= Maurice Ohana =

French composer

Maurice Ohana (12 June 1913 – 13 November 1992) was a French composer. Ohana's output includes choral works, string quartets, suites for ten-string guitar, a Tiento for six-string guitar, and operas.

== Life and career ==
Ohana was born in Casablanca, Morocco (during the French protectorate). His father, an Andalusian of Sephardic Jewish descent, had been born in the British Overseas Territory of Gibraltar, while his mother had Andalusian-Castilian origins. Ohana inherited British citizenship from his father. He originally studied architecture, but abandoned this in favour of a musical career, initially as a pianist. He studied under Alfredo Casella in Rome, returning to France in 1946. Around this time he founded the "Groupe Zodiaque", which fought against prevailing musical dogma. His mature musical style shows the influence of Mediterranean folk music, particularly the Andalusian cante jondo. In 1976 he took French citizenship.

Ohana's output includes the choral works Office des Oracles and Avoaha (1992), three string quartets (1963, 1980, 1989), and two suites for ten-string guitar: Si le jour paraît... (1963) and Cadran lunaire (1981–82), as well as a Tiento for six-string guitar (1957). He also wrote operas entitled Syllabaire pour Phèdre and La Célestine (based on La Celestina (1499).

He is also known for his extensive use of microtonality; for example, third- and quarter-tones in pieces like Le Tombeau de Debussy and Si le jour paraît.... He was influenced by the use of microintervals in the cante jondo.

Ohana rarely composed for large symphony orchestra: Synaxis (1966), Livre des Prodiges (1979) and T'Harân-Ngô (1974). He composed two cello concertos, one piano concerto and a guitar concerto (1958; dedicated to Narciso Yepes).

Ohana died in Paris, aged 79.
