= Gérard Abiton =

French classical guitarist

Gérard Abiton (born 1954) is a French classical guitarist. At 16 years old, Gerard Abiton joined the Conservatoire de Paris (cnsmdp) in Alexandre Lagoya's class.
