= Frederick Noad =

Musical artist (1929-2001)

- Birth name: Frederick McNeill Noad
- Born: August 8, 1929; Blankenberge, Belgium
- Died: September 13, 2001 (aged 72); Ventura, California, U.S.
- Genres: Classical, folk, flamenco
- Occupation(s): Guitarist, educator
- Instrument(s): Guitar, lute
- Website: www.noad.com

Frederick McNeill Noad (August 8, 1929 – September 13, 2001) was a classical guitar performer, educator, and a founder of the Guitar Foundation of America. Noad was best known for his popular instructional television series, Guitar with Frederick Noad, which was originally televised on PBS in the mid-1960s and re-syndicated in color in the early 1980s, and which continues to be broadcast today.

== Biography ==
Born in Blankenberge, Belgium, to British parents, who were on holiday in that country at the time, Noad moved at an early age with his family to Eversley, England and was originally introduced to music through the violin and piano. As a teenager, Noad started playing the guitar, which quickly became his favorite instrument.

Noad took a nontraditional path to becoming a professional musician. He received a liberal arts education at Wellington College, Berkshire, earning diplomas in a wide variety of disciplines including ancient history, Latin, Greek, and literature. After service in the Royal Corps of Signals, he earned his master's degree in jurisprudence at Brasenose College, Oxford University in 1957.

After graduating from college, Noad found work in the United States working for J Arthur Rank Films Company. But the company's restructuring made his job redundant and forced him to look for new work. It was at this point that Noad decided to pursue a career in music. He started a small music business in Hollywood, California called the Spanish Guitar Center where he offered music lessons and sold imported classical guitars from famous makers in Spanish cities such as Cordoba and Granada. He also continued his own study under Spanish guitar virtuoso Andrés Segovia during Segovia's renowned professional classes at Música en Compostela in Spain and also under English classical player Julian Bream.

Noad married Marilyn Clay Stuart on June 2, 1960. (It was during his honeymoon that he had met Segovia). Settling in California, Noad became an American citizen.

Noad soon established himself as a skilled performer and began teaching music at the University of California, Irvine and the California Institute of the Arts. He also authored several instructional guitar books, many focusing on classical guitar playing, but some also encompassing a wide variety of other styles such as travis picking, folk and country, flamenco, Latin rhythms, the blues, and rock and roll.

== Bibliography ==
- Noad, Frederick M. (1981). Playing the Guitar: A Self-Instruction Guide to Technique and Theory (3rd ed.). Schirmer Trade Books. ISBN 978-0825672088.
- Noad, Frederick M. (1986). First Book for the Guitar - Complete: Guitar Technique. G. Schirmer, Inc. ISBN 978-0793555222.
- Noad, Frederick M. (1992). 100 Graded Classical Guitar Studies. Music Sales America. ISBN 978-0711906129.
- Noad, Frederick M. (1998). The Virtual Guitarist: Hardware, Software and Websites for the Guitarist. Schirmer Trade Books. ISBN 978-0711922020.
- Noad, Frederick M. (1999). Classical Guitar Treasury. Music Sales America. ISBN 978-0711969773.
- Noad, Frederick M. (1999). Solo Guitar Playing Volume 2 (Classical Guitar) (3rd ed.). Music Sales America. ISBN 978-0825613074.
- Noad, Frederick M. (2000). The Renaissance Guitar. Music Sales America. ISBN 978-0825618130.
- Noad, Frederick M. (2000). The Baroque Guitar. Music Sales America. ISBN 978-0825618116.
- Noad, Frederick M. (2000). The Classical Guitar. Music Sales America. ISBN 978-0825618123.
- Noad, Frederick M. (2000). The Romantic Guitar. Music Sales America. ISBN 978-0825618147.
- Noad, Frederick M. (2001). The Complete Idiot's Guide to Playing the Guitar (2nd ed.). Alpha Books. ISBN 978-0028642444.
- Noad, Frederick M. (2008). Solo Guitar Playing Volume 1 (4th ed.). Music Sales America. ISBN 978-0825636790.
