= Carlos Andrés Segovia =

Spanish academic (born 1970)

The Most Illustrious The Marquis of Salobreña
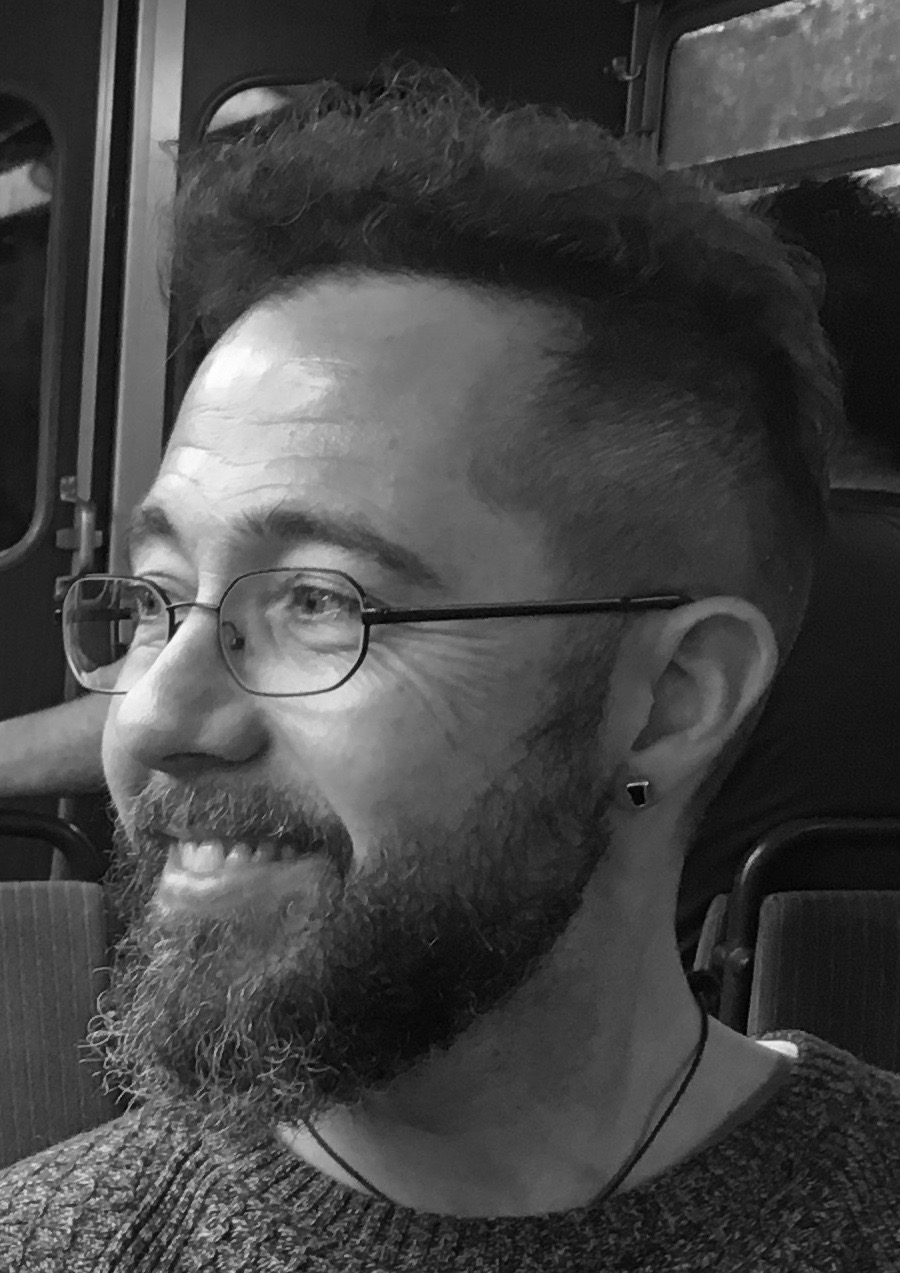
- Philosopher and scholar of religion Carlos A. Segovia
- Born: Carlos Andrés Segovia y Corral; 22 May 1970 (age 56)
- Occupation: Academic

Carlos Andrés Segovia y Corral, 2nd Marquis of Salobreña (born 22 May 1970), is a Spanish nobleman and academic specialising in philosophy and religious studies.

Segovia y Corral is an independent philosopher, scholar and writer based in Berlin, working at the crossroads of contemporary philosophy, the philosophy of mythology, and the philosophy of art. He was formerly associate professor of philosophy and religious studies at Saint Louis University in Madrid, Spain between 2013 and 2024.

Between 2018 and 2025, he worked against the backdrop of contemporary philosophical discussions on meta-conceptuality, contingency, and worlding, aiming at setting the basis of a post-nihilist ontology – post-nihilism being his own coined term in his co-authored book: Dionysus and Apollo after Nihilism: Rethinking the Earth–World Divide (2023), where he reworks Nietzsche's famous Dionysian/Apollonian distinction in terms of figure/ground reversal—an issue to which he has more recently dedicated another monograph, titled: Nietzsche's Pre-Dionysian Apollo and the Limits of Contemporary Thought (2026). In these works, Segovia y Corral's views the opposition between Openness and Closure as the core problem of today's philosophy, in which Closure remains the undesirable object and Openness tends to be conceived in three different ways: as dissolution, randomness, and chiastic articulation and infinitesimality. He explores this third possibility – which goes back variously to Heraclitus, Plato, Descartes Leibniz, Heidegger, and Lévi-Strauss – especially after Guattari, on whom he published in 2024 a monograph titled: Guattari Beyond Deleuze: Ontology and Modal Philosophy in Guattari's Major Writings, that cross-examines Guattari and Deleuze’s respective philosophies and highlights their divergent aspects, as well as a co-edited volume (with Gary Genosko) titled in turn: Guattari and the Ancients: Theatrical Dialogues in Early Philosophy.

In 2026, Segovia y Corral has begun working on a post-nihilist aesthetics, as a way of both fulfilling and supplementing the aforementioned post-nihilist ontology. He has published in this sense two essays in open acces titled: Beyond Immanence: Aesthetic Explorations and Ariadne's Letters: A Short Essay on Madame de Sévigné, and is currently preparing a monograph titled: Poetry and Philosophy after Blanchot and Zambrano: Between Word and World (forthcoming with Palgrave Macmillan).

In addition to teaching at St Louis University Missouri (Madrid Campus) between 2013 and 2024, he has visiting professor at the University of Aarhus and the Free University of Brussels, and guest lecturer at the European Research Council, the École Normale Supérieure, Bauhaus-Universität Weimar, the Catholic University of the Sacred Heart in Milan, the European University at St Petersburg, Waseda University in Tokyo, and Ryukoku University in Kyoto. Convinced, however, that higher education within mainstream academia is undergoing a form of intellectual exhaustion, he has turned to more alternative and experimental venues in which thinking may still be pursued as a form of art and a way of approaching the unknown. He collaborates regularly, among other independent higher-education initiatives, with Incite Seminars, where he has facilitated seminars like “Life as an Untotalizable Enigma: The Lame Ontology of Greek Mythology,” “Anarchia and Archai: Re-Imagining the Pre-Socratics” (with Hannes Schumacher), “Plato Inside Out—or: as You Never Imagined It… with and beyond Derrida,” “(Un)Timely Blanchot,” (with Philippe Lynes, Alex Obrigewitsch, and Kim Schoof) “Between Death and Beauty: Diving into René Char’s Post-Nihilist Poetics,” Foucault’s Greeks as Savages? A Cross-cultural Approach to the Aesthetics of Existence (with Camilo Rios), “Chaosmic Landscapes in Guattari’s Latest Works,” “Aesthetic Encounters with the Uncanny: Towards a Minimal Pneumatology,” and “Fractured Ontologies in Music” (with Andrea de Donato and Gorica Orsholits). He has also collaborated punctually with the Ereignis Center for Philosophy and the Arts in Moss, Norway, and Parrhesia School of Philosophy in Berlin, and works, more generally, as a private philosophy tutor and intellectual mentor, offering individualized instruction, rigorous philosophical guidance, and advanced academic mentorship.

Furthermore, Segovia y Corral has published on comparative ontologies at the crossroads of Anthropocene studies, contemporary philosophy, and cultural anthropology, which have resulted in several publications in edited volumes like Jan Alber's The Apocalyptic Dimensions of Climate Change, Joan Pedro-Caraña, Eliana Herrera-Huérfano, and Elena Ochoa-Almanza's Communication Justice in the Pluriverse: An International Dialogue, and in the journal Tipití: Journal of the Society for the Anthropology of Lowland South-America; as well as in the organization of several workshops and artshops, including Becoming Terrans at the Institute for X in Godsbanen, Aarhus (Denmark). Plus, as a diagrammatic artist himself, he has worked, published and presented publicly his work on the reciprocal presupposition of earth and world, the earth's semiotic prism, the dynamics of openness and closure, the role of axiological antitheses in cinematographic diegesis, infinitesimalness in musical counterpoint, Heraclitus's fractal logic, Antigone's rhythmic registers, and contemporary philosophy's post-nihilist geography and meta-conceptual star.

Lastly, between 2008 and 2018 Segovia y Corral mostly worked on late-antique religion (with special emphasis on the intertwining of group-identity markers, sectarian boundaries, discursive strategies, and more generally the conceptualisation of hybridity and ambiguity in religious origins, as a means to counter present-day religious fundamentalism, ethnocentrism, and xenophobia); and published several books on these and other related issues, including Remapping Emergent Islam: Texts, Social Settings, and Ideological Trajectories, The Quranic Jesus: A New Interpretation, The Quranic Noah and the Making of the Islamic Prophet: A Study of Intertextuality and Religious Identity Formation in Late Antiquity, and (with Gabriele Boccaccini) Paul the Jew: Rereading the Apostle as a Figure of Second Temple Judaism, He was also series co-editor of Apocalypticism: Cross-disciplinary Explorations at Peter Lang. as well as the Spanish translation of Daniel Boyarin's Border Lines: The Partition of Judaeo-Christianity: Espacios fronterizos. Judaísmo y cristianismo en la Antigüedad tardía. Formerly, between 2005 and 2007, he had published several translations into Spanish of Avicenna's and Abu Hasan al-Ash'ari's works, and a monograph on the philosophy of Mulla Sadra in contemporary perspective: Șadr ad-Dīn Šīrāzī: La filosofía islámica y el problema del ser.

Segovia y Corral is the author of numerous scholarly books and articles, including the essays: Ariadne's Letters: A Short Essay on Madame de Sévigné and Beyond Immanence: Aesthetic Explorations; the monographs Nietzsche's Pre-Dionysian Apollo and the Limits of Contemporary Thought, Guattary Beyond Deleuze: Ontology and Modal Philosophy in Guattari's Major Writings, Dionysus and Apollo after Nihilism: Rethinking the Earth–World Divide (with Sofya Shaikut), Guattari and the Ancients: Theatrical Dialogues in Early Philosophy (with Gary Genosko), Immanence and the Sacred,The Quranic Noah and the Making of the Islamic Prophet: A Study of Intertextuality and Religious Identity Formation in Late Antiquity, and The Quranic Jesus: A New Interpretation; the edited journal topical issues Conceptual Personae in Ontology, and From Worlds of Possibles to Possible Worlds: On Post-nihilism and Dwelling; the edited volume Remapping Emergent Islam: Texts, Social Settings, and Ideological Trajectories; and articles such as "Spinoza as Savage Thought," "Post-Heideggerian Drifts: From Object-Oriented-Ontology Worldlessness to Post-Nihilist Worldings," "Earth and World(s): From Heidegger's Fourfold to Contemporary Anthropology," "Rethinking Dionnysus and Apollo: Redrawing Today's Philosophical Board," "Guattari \ Heidegger: On Quaternities, Deterritorialisation and Worlding", "From Worlds of Possibles to Possible Worlds – or, Dionysus and Apollo after Nihilism," "Paul and the Plea for Contingency in Contemporary Philosophy: A Philosophical and Anthropological Critique," "Tupi or Not Tupi – That is the Question: On Semiocannibalism, Its Variants, and their Logics," "Impromptu: The Alien – Heraclitus's Cut," "Fire in Three Images, from Heraclitus to the Anthropocene," "Four Cosmopolitical Ideas for an Unworlded World," "The New Animism: Experimental, Isomeric, Liminal, and Chaosmic," and "Rethinking Death's Sacredness: From Heraclitus's frag. DK B62 to Robert Gardner's Dead Birds"; also writes regularly about philosophy at polymorph.blog.

Carlos Andrés Segovia y Corral is the youngest child of the celebrated classical guitarist Andrés Segovia, the first Marquis of Salobreña.

He is now married to performance artist and Butoh dancer Sofya Shaikut.
