= Olga Praguer Coelho =

Brazilian folk singer and guitarist (1909–2008)

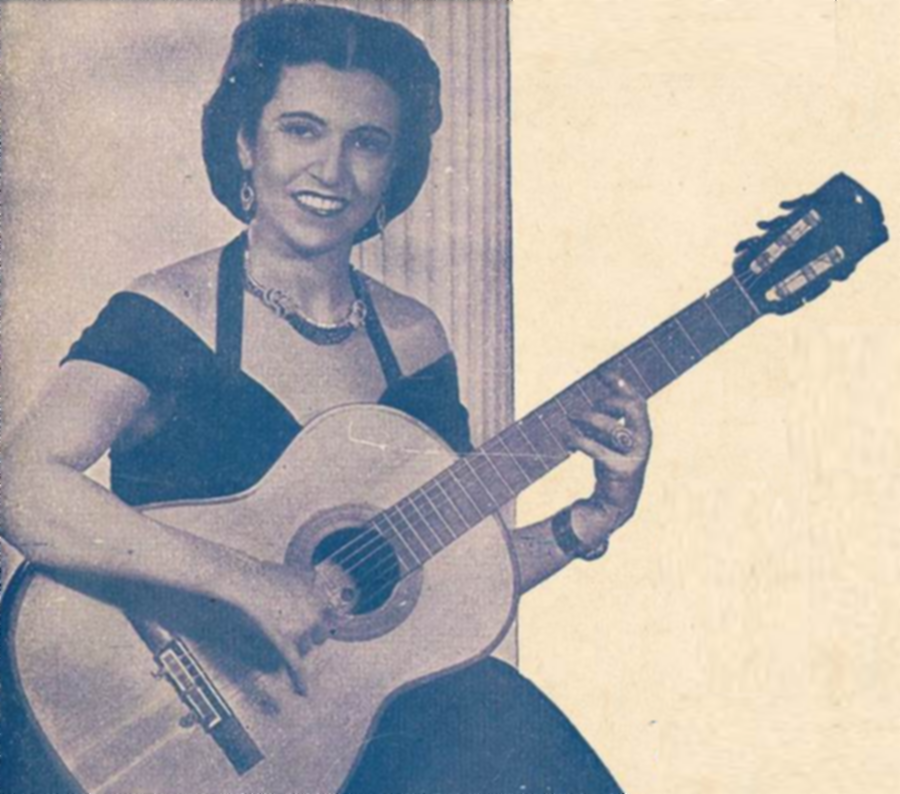
Olga Praguer Coelho

Olga Praguer Coelho (12 August 1909 – 25 February 2008) was a Brazilian folk singer and guitarist. She was one of the famous soprano-guitarists with an ability to sing in different languages.

== Biography ==
Olga Praguer Coelho was born on 12 August 1909 in Manaus, Amazonas, Brazil, and raised in Salvador, Bahia. In 1923 her family moved to Rio de Janeiro where she began to learn the guitar and to train her voice. Following her debut in 1922, she performed at the National School of Music in 1923.

In 1924, she began studying guitar with Patrício Teixeira (1893–1972), a Brazilian singer and guitarist. She later started learning music theory, harmony, and composition from Oscar Lorenzo Fernández, a Brazilian composer of Spanish descent. She also studied voice from Gabriella Besanzoni, a noted Italian opera singer. She had her first public performance on the Patricio Teixeira's Radio Club do Brasil in 1927. In 1931 she married the poet Gaspar Coelho (1898–1986). She occasionally released musical albums.

In 1936, President Getúlio Vargas appointed her as Ambassador of Brazilian Music to Europe which enabled her to extensively travel to different European countries including Germany, Italy, France, Austria, Hungary, Belgium, and Britain. In Hungary, Béla Bartók was in the audience during her musical program.

In 1939, along with her husband Gaspar Coelho, she undertook an international musical tour and travelled to Portugal, Australia, New Zealand, Singapore and South Africa. On her return, she performed at the White House for Eleanor Roosevelt. From 1944, she started a relationship with Andrés Segovia, a noted Spanish classical guitarist, which lasted for two decades. They settled in New York and pursued a music careers in the international arena. In the 1970s she returned to Brazil and settled at her childhood home in Rio de Janeiro. She participated in different radio and TV programs. In recognizing her contributions to Brazilian culture, in 2004, she was awarded the Order of Cultural Merit by the Brazilian Ministry of Culture.

She died at the age of 98 in Rio de Janeiro, Brazil on 25 February 2008.
