= Concierto del Sur =

Composition by Manuel Ponce

The Concierto del Sur (Spanish: Concerto of the South) is a concerto for classical guitar and orchestra written by the Mexican composer Manuel M. Ponce. The concerto was written for the Spanish guitarist Andrés Segovia, who premiered it in 1941.

== Structure ==
The concerto consists of three movements:

1. Allegro moderato
2. Andante
3. Allegro moderato e festivo

== Recordings ==
- The Segovia Collection, Vol. 2: Ponce, Rodrigo, Torroba. Andrés Segovia (guitar), Symphony of the Air, Enrique Jordá. BMG, 1987
- John Williams: The Great Guitar Concertos. John Williams (guitar), London Symphony Orchestra, André Previn. CBS, 1989
- Rodrigo: Concierto de Aranjuez / Villa‐Lobos: Concerto for Guitar / Ponce: Concierto del sur. Sharon Isbin (guitar), New York Philharmonic, José Serebrier. Warner Classics, 2005
