= Enric Madriguera =

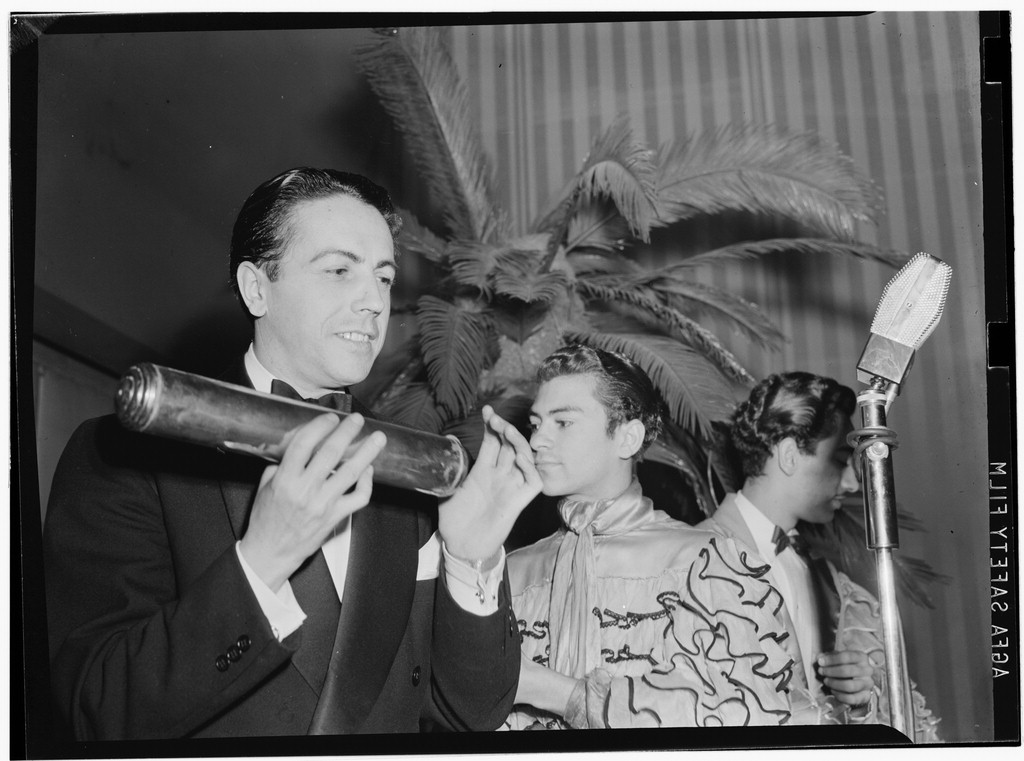
Enric Madriguera in 1947

Enric R. Madriguera (17 February 1902 – 7 September 1973) was a violinist of spanish origin who was playing concerts as a child before he studied at the Barcelona Conservatory (the Castilian form of his name is Enrique, which he sometimes used on records).

== Biography ==
Madriguera was born in Barcelona, Spain. His sister was pianist Paquita Madriguera, the second wife of Andres Segovia. Whilst still in his twenties, Madriguera was lead violinist at Boston's Symphony orchestras, before becoming the conductor of the Cuban Philharmonic.

In the late 1920s, Madriguera played in Ben Selvin's studio orchestra at Columbia Records in New York, and served briefly as that company's director of Latin music recording. In 1932, Madriguera began his own orchestra at the Biltmore Hotel, which recorded for Columbia until 1934. During this period, his music was mostly Anglo-American dance or foxtrot, and frequently jazz-inflected, although he had a modest hit with his rhumba rendition of "Carioca" (1934).

By the 1930s, Madriguera was recording Latin American music almost exclusively; his composition "Adios" became a national hit in 1931. On his radio appearances, the band was billed as Enric Madriguera and His Music of the Americas, and "Adios" was its theme song. It was said that the ambassadors from all the South American countries declared Madriguera to be the 'Ambassador of Music to all the Americas'. Madriguera appeared in a number of "musical shorts", including Enric Madriguera and his Orchestra (1946), in which he performed a number of songs, also providing the orchestra for his vocalist and wife, Patricia Gilmore. A review of one of his appearances recorded how he "reflected the warmth of our neighbors to the south".

He died in retirement in Danbury, Connecticut.
