= Friedrich Schorr =

American opera singer

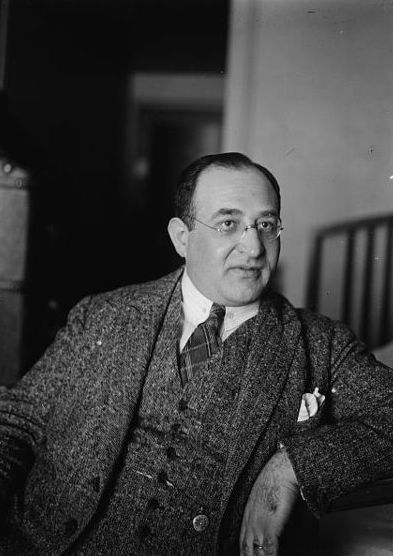
Friedrich Schorr

Friedrich Schorr (September 2, 1888 – August 14, 1953), was a renowned Austrian-Hungarian bass-baritone opera singer of Jewish origin. He later became a naturalized American.

Schorr was particularly famous for his profound portrayals of Wotan in Der Ring des Nibelungen and Hans Sachs in Die Meistersinger von Nürnberg. He was celebrated, too, for his appearances as Don Pizarro in Beethoven's Fidelio.

His voice was powerful, steady, and rich-toned, with a beautiful mezza voce. He placed a special emphasis on maintaining a smooth, legato line in his singing, with no trace of Sprechgesang. Towards the end of Schorr's career, his extreme top notes became somewhat 'wooden', however, as the result of many years of strenuous usage.

== Biography ==
The son of a cantor (hazzan) Mayer Schorr, who reportedly had a fine voice himself, Schorr was born in Oradea [Nagyvarad at the time]. He studied in Brno and Vienna with Adolf Robinson. He made his stage debut in Graz, singing there in 1912-1916. Afterwards he worked in Prague (1916–1918), Cologne (1918–1923), Berlin (State Opera Unter den Linden, 1923–1931). He also made acclaimed appearances in London at Covent Garden (1924–1931), at New York's Metropolitan Opera (1924–1943) and the Bayreuth Festival (1925–1933).

Schorr emigrated to the United States in 1931. He lived in New York City and performed regularly at the Metropolitan Opera until 1943. Some of the Wagnerian singers that he appeared with during his career included Frida Leider, Lotte Lehmann, Elisabeth Rethberg, Lauritz Melchior, Kirsten Flagstad, and Helen Traubel. After his retirement from performance he worked as a director and gave concerts. He also taught singing privately. One of his students was mezzo-soprano Nell Tangeman. He died in Farmington, Connecticut.

== Recordings ==
Schorr made a number of recordings both in Europe and America by both the acoustic and electrical processes. Although some of them, particularly those recorded in America, were produced after he had passed his artistic zenith, these records still prove Schorr's vocal strength and solidity, his clear diction, his excellent breathing, and the great emotional expressiveness of his interpretations. Most of his records are available on CD transfers issued by various companies, including a number of live operatic performances dating from the 1930s.
