= Parque Lage =

Park in Zona Sul, Rio de Janeiro, Brazil

Coordinates: 22.9606°S 43.212°W

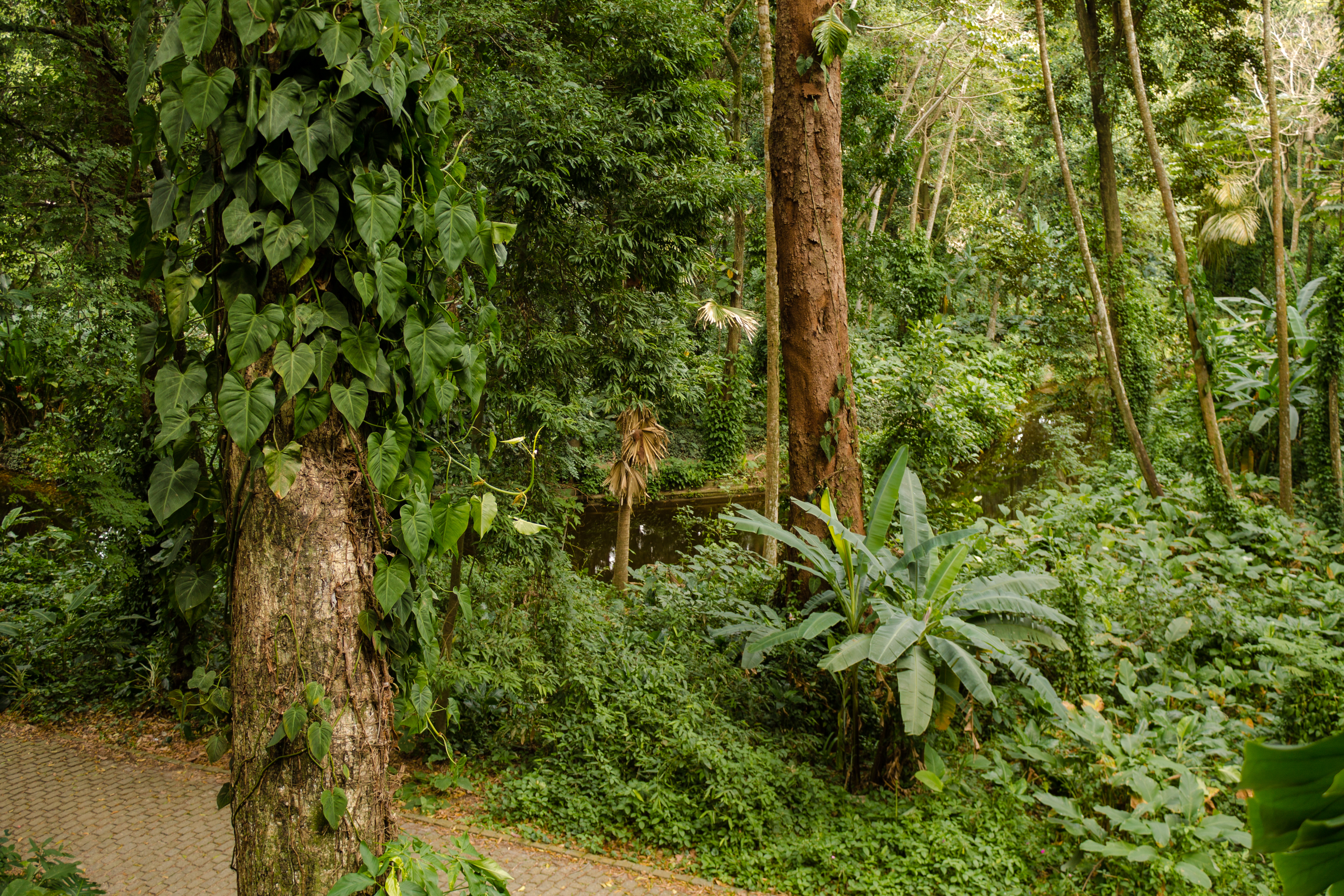
Rustic landscape garden with tropical plants at Parque Lage

Parque Henrique Lage, known as Parque Lage, is a public park in the city of Rio de Janeiro, located in the Jardim Botânico neighborhood at the foot of the Corcovado, on top of which Christ the Redeemer is located.

The atrium of the mansion with café.

Antonio Martins Lage, who was married to Felicité Clarisse de Labourdonnay, daughter of the Count of Labourdonnay, purchased the property in the early 1830s. The rustic landscape garden, designed by John Tyndale and featuring an elaborate artificial grotto, dates to approximately 1840. A secondary grotto contains a series of 12 aquarium tanks. In the early 20th century, the estate became the residence of industrialist Henrique Lage and his wife, singer Gabriella Besanzoni. During the 1920s, Lage had the mansion remodeled by Italian architect Mario Vodret, with interior paintings by Salvador Payols Sabaté.

The National Historical and Artistic Heritage Institute (IPHAN) listed Parque Lage, on June 14 1957, as a historical and cultural heritage site for the city of Rio de Janeiro.

In the 1960s, the land became a public park, with walking trails through subtropical forest. The Escola de Artes Visuais do Parque Lage (Visual Arts School of Parque Lage) and a café open to the public operate from the former mansion.

The mansion was used as the British Olympic Team hospitality house and is notably featured in the 2003 music video for Snoop Dogg's single "Beautiful".

== Beauty and attractions ==
Rio de Janeiro offers its residents and tourists alike an exuberant natural environment combined with the modernity of a large metropolis. Parque Lage, in turn, boasts not only its natural sophistication, offering its visitors its beautiful forest, imperial palm trees, gardens built in the European style, fountains and benches for a good moment of relaxation, but also the sophistication and class of its architectural ensemble.
