= Adrienne Matzenauer =

American singer

- Born: Adrienne Ferrari-Fontana; January 20, 1914; Boston, Massachusetts
- Died: June 10, 2010 (age 96); Santa Monica, California
- Other names: Adrienne Fontana, Adrienne Myerberg, Adrienne Henoch
- Occupations: Singer, television host
- Parent(s): Margaret Matzenauer; Edoardo Ferrari-Fontana

Adrienne Matzenauer Ferrari-Fontana (January 20, 1914 – June 10, 2010) was an American singer and television host.

== Early life and education ==
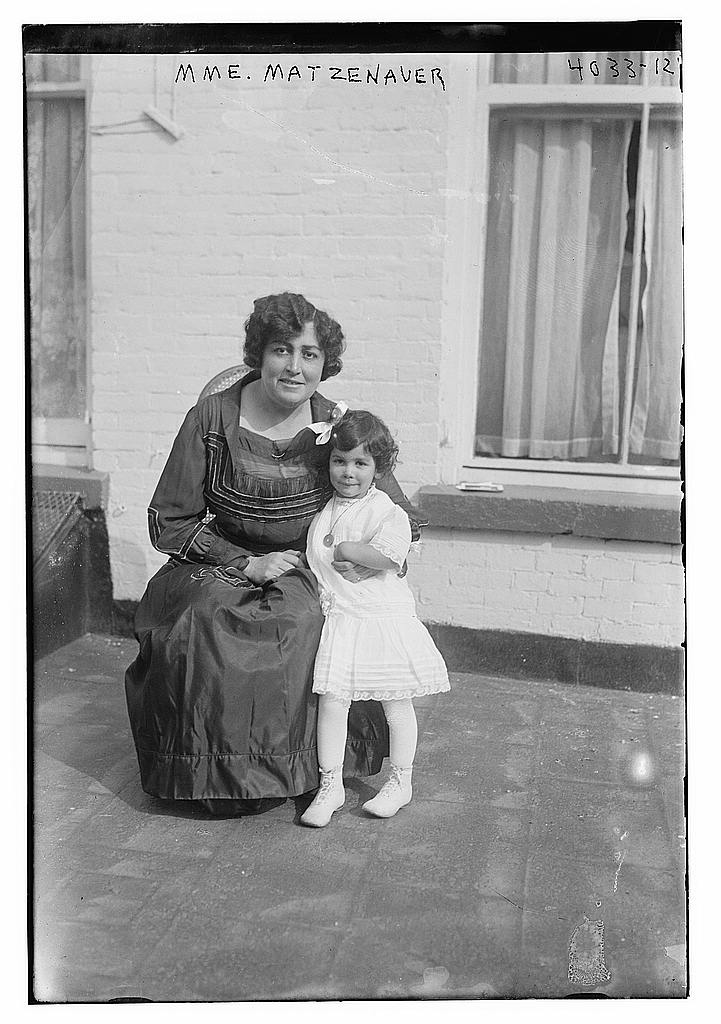
Adrienne Matzenauer as a child, with her mother; from the Library of Congress

Adrienne Matzenauer Ferrari-Fontana was born in Boston, Massachusetts, the daughter of Margaret Matzenauer and Edoardo Ferrari-Fontana. She was known as "the first grand opera baby", because her mother was prima donna contralto with the Metropolitan Opera, and her father, an Italian physician, was leading dramatic tenor with the Boston Opera Company. Enrico Caruso was her godfather. Her parents divorced in 1917. She was raised in her mother's household, and toured with her mother in 1923.

== Career ==
As a young woman, Matzenauer appeared in two Broadway productions, Life Begins at 8:40 (1934) and Symphony (1935). In 1936, she was cast in the George Cukor film Camille, but she collapsed on the set and was replaced by Jean Acker. She sang on radio broadcasts, and was a nightclub singer at the Place Piquale in New York, the Rainbow Room in Rockefeller Center, and at the Balinese Room in Boston, in the 1930s and 1940s. She was back on Broadway in 1948, in If the Shoe Fits. In 1948 she hosted a variety television program, Champagne and Orchids, on the DuMont Network.

In her later life, as Adrienne Henoch, she lived in Southern California, and cared for her mother in her last years. In the early 1970s, she sang on a cruise ship.

== Personal life ==
Matzenauer married theatrical producer and director Michael Myerberg; they had two sons, Edward Antonio (known as Tony) and Paul, and divorced in 1958. Her second husband was Robert J. Henoch; they married in 1961 and divorced in 1976. She died in 2010, at the age of 96, in her Santa Monica, California home.
