= Margaret Matzenauer =

American opera singer (1881–1963)

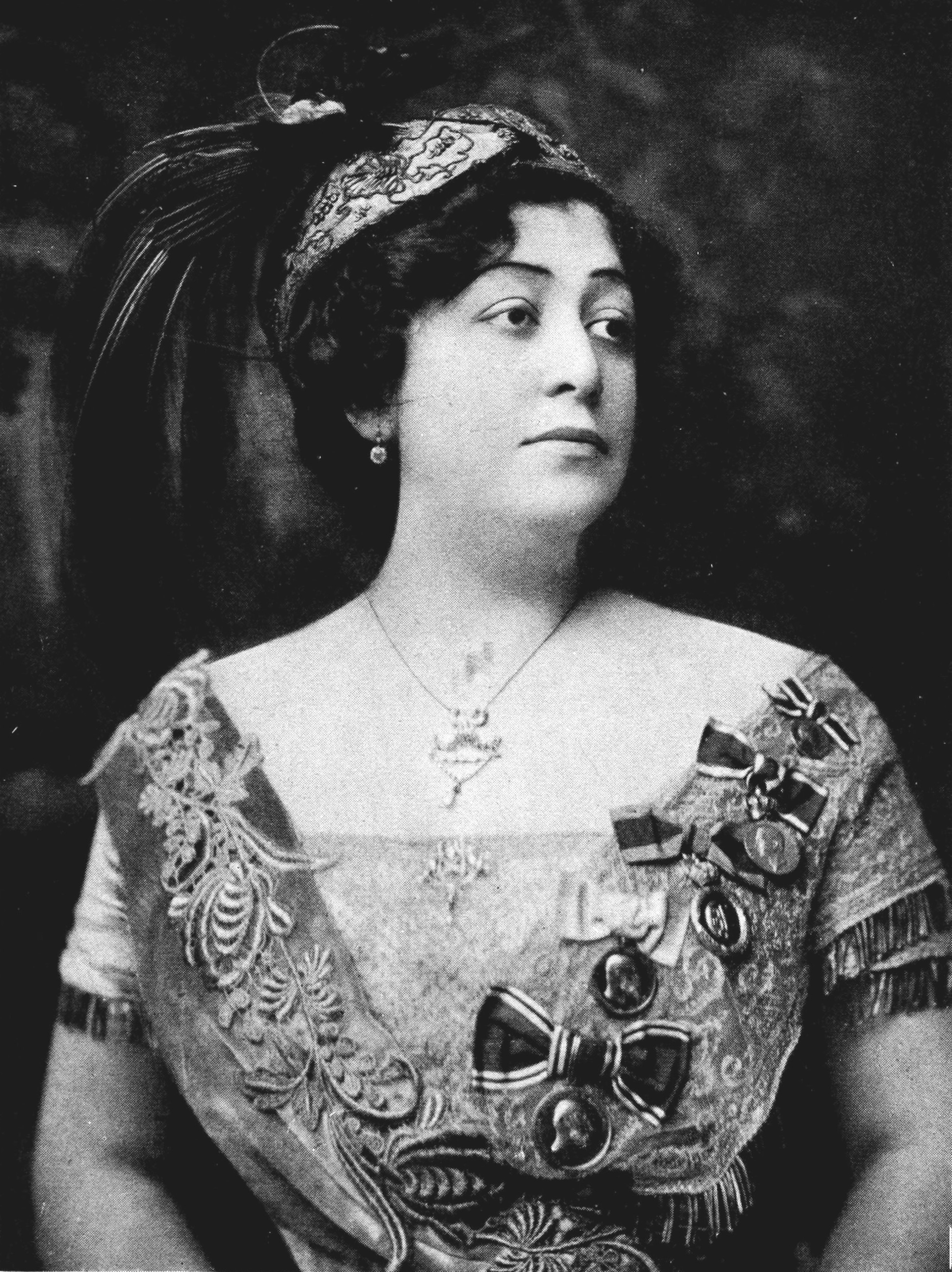
- Born: 1 June 1881; Temesvár, Austria-Hungary
- Died: 19 May 1963 (aged 81); Van Nuys, California, USA
- Occupation: Singer
- Spouse: Edoardo Ferrari-Fontana (m. 1912; div. 1917)
- Children: Adrienne Fontana

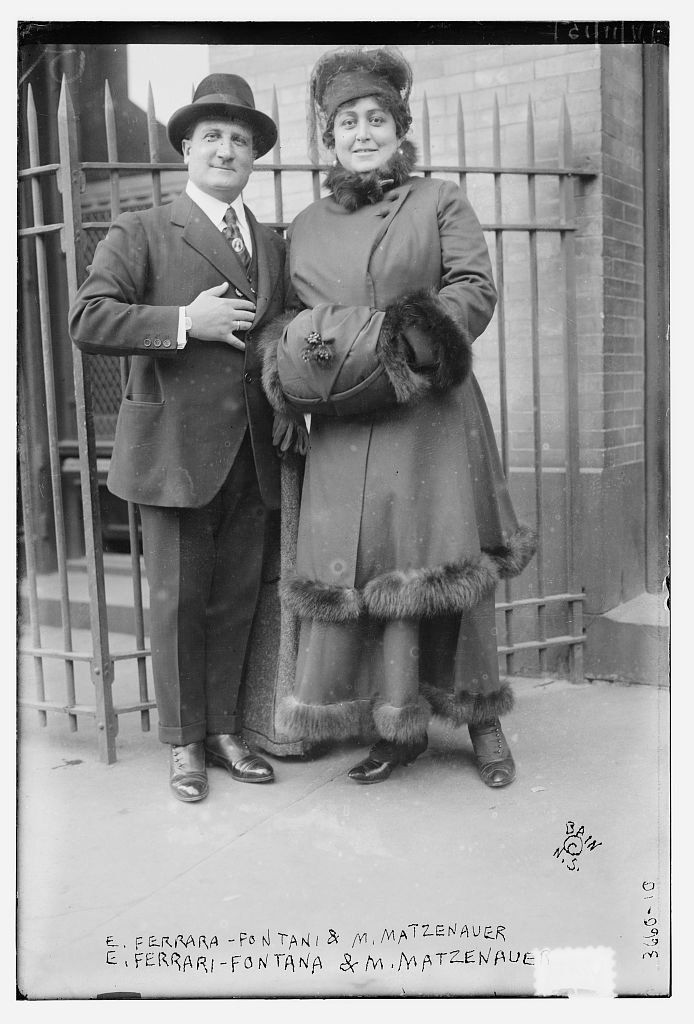
Edoardo Ferrari-Fontana and Margaret Matzenauer in 1915 at the Metropolitan Opera

Margaret Matzenauer (sometimes spelled Margarete Matzenauer or Margarethe Matzenaur) (1 June 1881 – 19 May 1963) was an Austria-Hungary-born, later resident in the United States, mezzo-soprano and contralto. She had an opulent timbre and wide range. She performed key works from both the Italian and German operatic repertoires in Europe and the United States.

== Biography ==
Matzenauer was born in Temesvár, Kingdom of Hungary, Austria-Hungary (now Timișoara, Romania). Her father Ludwig was a conductor, her mother an opera singer. She reportedly considered herself Hungarian although she was born in what is now western Romania, of German Jewish descent.

Matzenauer studied opera in Graz and Berlin, making her operatic debut in 1901 as Puck in Weber's Oberon. She began singing major roles such as Azucena in Verdi's Il trovatore, Bizet's Carmen, Mignon by Ambroise Thomas, Waltraute and Erda in the Wagner's Ring cycles and Ortrud in Lohengrin. She first achieved fame in Europe as a contralto and mezzo-soprano, and she was engaged to appear at the 1911 Bayreuth Festival. She was tempted to tackle soprano parts as well but this expansion upwards of her repertoire did not prove to be an unqualified success due to limitations with her highest notes.

Matzenauer made her debut (as a mezzo) at the New York Metropolitan Opera in Aida on 13 November 1911, singing Amneris on opening night with a cast that also featured Emmy Destinn as Aida and Enrico Caruso as Radamès, with Arturo Toscanini conducting. A few days later she displayed her versatility by appearing as Brangäne in Wagner's Tristan und Isolde.

In 1911, Matzenauer married one of her Met colleagues, the Italian-born dramatic tenor Edoardo Ferrari-Fontana (1878-1936). Consequently, she acquired automatic Italian citizenship. The marriage ended in divorce in 1917.

Matzenauer reportedly had an eidetic memory and on 1 January 1912 when, with only a few days' notice, she appeared in the highly demanding role of Kundry in Wagner's Parsifal, an opera she had never sung before.

Matzenauer sang at the Met for a total of 19 seasons, delivering a wide variety of roles including Eboli in the first Met production of Verdi's Don Carlos (1920), Santuzza in Mascagni's Cavalleria Rusticana, Marina in Mussorgsky's Boris Godunov, Leonore in Beethoven's Fidelio and Brünnhilde in Wagner's Die Walküre. She gave her farewell Met performance on 17 February 1930 as Amneris, but she continued singing opera elsewhere and giving concerts.

In 1924, she appeared at the Royal Albert Hall, London at a Special Sunday concert with pianist Solito de Solis. In 1936, she played the part of Madame Pomponi in the Columbia Pictures production of Mr. Deeds Goes to Town.

She taught singing; two of her pupils were mezzo-sopranos Blanche Thebom and Nell Tangeman. Her last stage appearance was in a Broadway comedy, Vicki, in 1942.

Tenor Giacomo Lauri Volpi mentioned her in his Voci parallele as one of the only three true contraltos he had encountered throughout his career (the others being Gabriella Besanzoni and Matilde Blanco Sadun).

Matzenauer died in 1963, aged 81, at the Sherman Way Convalescent Hospital in Van Nuys, California.

== Legacy ==
Her daughter was Adrienne Fontana, former nightclub singer and host of variety TV show Champagne and Orchids, on the DuMont Network in early television. Matzenauer made a sizeable number of recordings, many of which are available on CD reissues.
