= Nell Tangeman =

American opera singer

Nell Tangeman (21 December 1914 – 15 February 1965) was an American mezzo-soprano, most associated with the operas of Stravinsky.

== Early life ==
Tangeman was born in Columbus, Ohio. After earning a degree in violin performance from Ohio State University, she pursued vocal studies at the Cleveland Institute of Music. She studied with Friedrich Schorr, Margaret Matzenaur, and Nadia Boulanger.

== Career ==
In 1946, Tangeman made her New York debut singing the role of Jocasta in Igor Stravinsky's Oedipus rex with the New York Philharmonic under conductor Leonard Bernstein. In 1947, she sang the New York premiere of Aaron Copland's In the Beginning with the Collegiate Chorale and conductor Robert Shaw.

In 1951, Tangeman created the role of Mother Goose in the world premiere of Stravinsky's The Rake's Progress at La Fenice in Venice. The following year, she performed the role of Dinah in the world premiere of Bernstein's Trouble in Tahiti at Berstein's Festival of the Creative Arts on the campus of Brandeis University in Waltham, Massachusetts, to an audience of nearly 3,000 people. In 1955, she performed the role of Teresa in the American Opera Society's production of Vincenzo Bellini's La sonnambula at Carnegie Hall. As a recitalist, she championed new works by American composers, most notably Ned Rorem, who wrote several works with her voice in mind.

She made one recording during her career, performing Arnold Schoenberg's Gurre-Lieder with conductor Rene Leibowitz in 1951.

== Death ==
Tangeman died in Washington, D.C., aged fifty, of unknown causes.
