= Antonio Membrado =

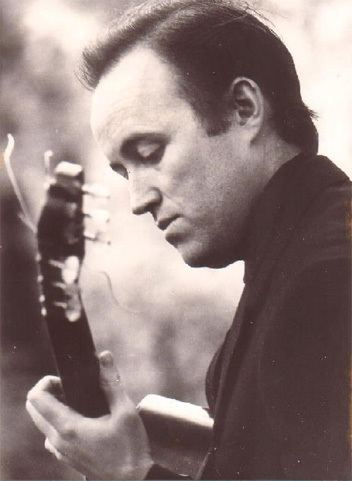
- Portrait of Membrado, Paris, 1966

Background information
- Born: Antonio Membrado; 21 March 1935; Madrid, Spain
- Died: 3 December 2016 (aged 81) Kaysersberg, France
- Genre: Classical
- Occupations: Classical guitarist, composer
- Instrument: Guitar
- Years active: 1959–1991
- Labels: Philips, Emen, Antonio Membrado
- Website: www.membrado.com

Antonio Membrado (21 March 1935 – 3 December 2016) was a Spanish classical guitarist and composer who lived in France from 1959. He was a student of Andrés Segovia and gave many concerts in France and abroad.

== Biography ==
Membrado was born in Madrid. In 1945, he started playing the laúd, a plectrum-plugged string instrument popular in Spain and used in rondallas (small ensembles playing instruments plucked with a plectrum, such as bandurria or laúd, and with the fingers, such as guitar). At age 13, the guitarist Manuel Hernandez initiated his future musical career. He also studied the piano at the Madrid Conservatory with the pianist and composer Pedro Carre.

In 1952, Membrado met Regino Sainz de la Maza and entered the Madrid Academia guitar class. In 1956, he won the Madrid Conservatory Extraordinary Prize. At 17, he also began to appear in his first guitar recitals in Spain. At 21, he met Andrés Segovia for the first time at the Accademia Musicale Chigiana in Italy, which he attended until 1959. Andrés Segovia asked Membrado to deliver the Academy's closing concerts in 1958 and 1959.

In September 1956, Antonio Membrado won the First Medal of the International Competition in Geneva. That year his international career began, with appearances in France, Belgium, Germany, Switzerland, the United States, etc. From 1963 he published LP recordings of works by Vivaldi, Schubert, Bach, Villa-Lobos, Brouwer, Burchard, Milan, and some of his own works, including a live recording of his concert at the Lincoln Center in New York in 1975. Membrado also arranged works for the singer Paco Ibáñez and accompanied him on his first LP in 1964.

In addition to his performing career, Membrado served as guitar teacher at the national academy of Bourg-la-Reine, where he trained numerous pupils, many of them later following professional music careers. He also took part in many festivals including Strasbourg, Lille, Troyes, Bern, Avignon, Saint-Tropez, Carcassonne, etc., and delivered several master-classes, e.g. at Les Arcs, Evian and Carcassonne.

Membrado gradually withdrew from the public stage; his last concert was on 4 July 1991 at the World Congress of Quantum Chemistry at the Palace of Europe. He then devoted himself to a more intimate approach to music and to composing works for one or two guitars to poems or texts from Guillevic, Tagore, Jankelevich, Cioran, Rückert, etc.

In 1995, a compilation album comprising three CDs of his major pieces recorded on LP was published.
