= Mayer Schorr =

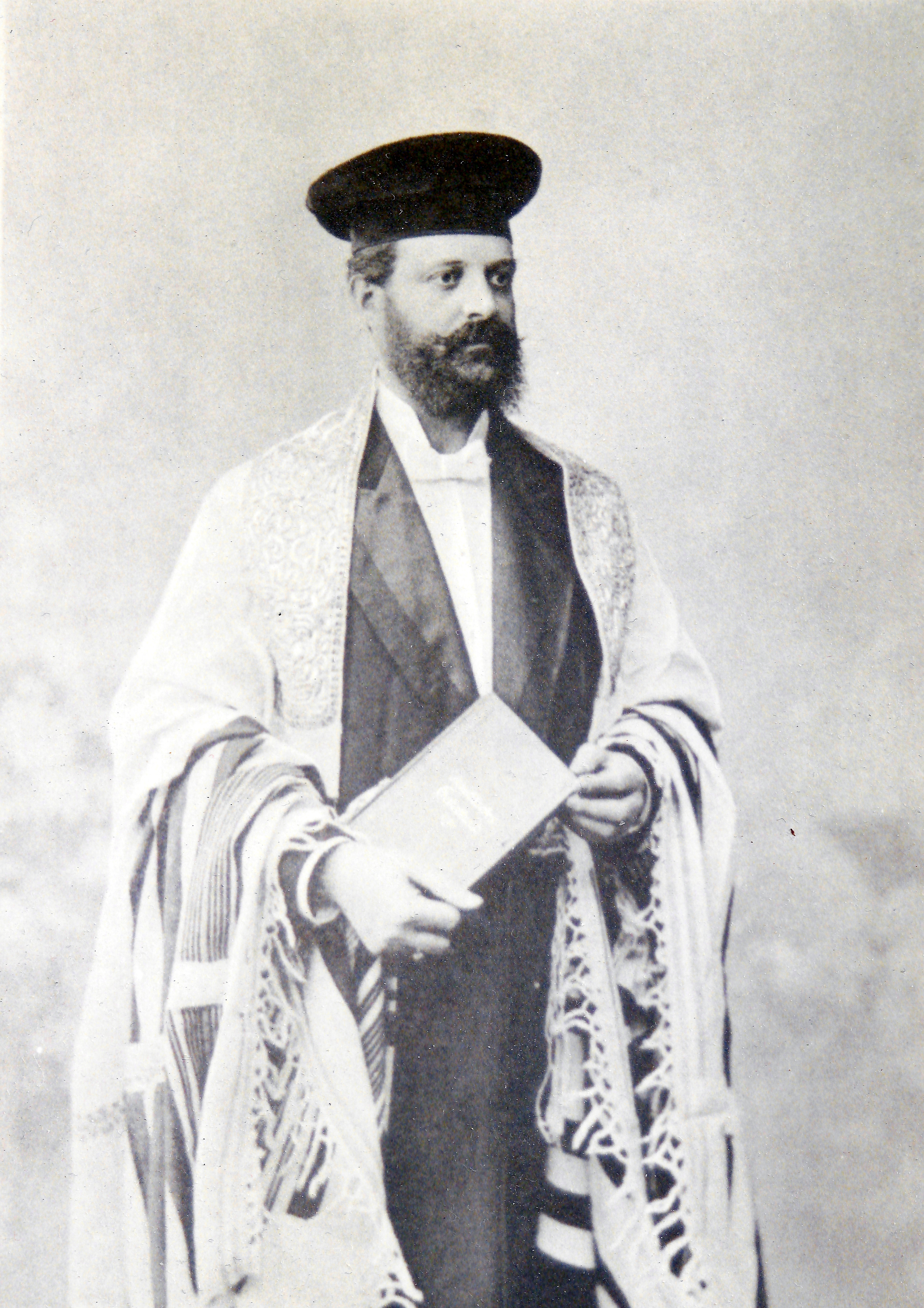
- Born: October 11, 1856; Fălticeni
- Died: December 24, 1913 (aged 57); Vienna
- Occupation: Hazzan
- Notable work: Halel Wesimroh

Mayer Schorr (11 October 1856 — 24 December 1913) was a cantor in Vienna.

== Biography ==
Mayer Schorr was born in Fălticeni, Romania. For years he held the title of Oberkantor. He was cantor of the Polish Synagogue in Vienna.He was the father of operatic baritone Friedrich Schorr. In 1902 he published a selection of cantorial music, Halel Wesimroh: Lobgesänge der Synagoge für Cantor und gemischten Chor. He left five recordings with his choir for Columbia (Vienna 1904).

Schorr died in Vienna.

== Music career ==
Schorr is known to have made a handful of recordings for the Columbia Phonograph Company:

- Aresches Sefosenu, Columbia E 374; also issued as 41124
- Weschomeru: Kiddusch lerosch haschonoh, Columbia E 375; also issued as 41129
- Haschkiwenu, Columbia E 376; also issued as 41126
- Ki attoh schaumea kol schafor (Schorr), Columbia 41125
- Hinneni heuni (Schorr), Columbia 41128
