= Manuel Ponce =

Mexican composer (1882–1948)

Manuel María Ponce
- Manuel María Ponce
- Born: Manuel María Ponce Cuéllar; 8 December 1882; Fresnillo, Zacatecas, Mexico
- Died: 24 April 1948 (aged 65); Mexico City, Mexico
- Education: National Conservatory of Music (Mexico), Conservatorio Giovanni Battista Martini (Italy), Stern Conservatory (Germany)
- Occupations: Composer, music educator, scholar
- Era: 20th century
- Notable work: "Estrellita", "Concierto del Sur", "Variations and Fugue on 'La Folia'"
- Spouse: Clementina Maurel

Manuel María Ponce Cuéllar (8 December 1882 – 24 April 1948), known in Mexico as Manuel M. Ponce, was a 20th-century Mexican composer, music educator, and scholar whose work connected the concert scene with a mostly forgotten tradition of popular song and Mexican folklore. Many of his compositions are strongly influenced by the harmonies and form of traditional songs.

== Biography ==
=== Early years ===
Born in Fresnillo, Zacatecas, Manuel Maria Ponce moved with his family to the city of Aguascalientes only a few weeks after his birth and lived there until he was 15 years old.

He was famous for being a musical prodigy; according to his biographers, he was barely four years of age when, after having listened to the piano classes received by his sister, Josefina, he sat in front of the instrument and interpreted one of the pieces that he had heard. Immediately, his parents had him receive classes in piano and musical notation.

=== Traveling years ===
In 1901 Ponce entered the National Conservatory of Music, already with a certain prestige as a pianist and composer. There he remained until 1903, the year in which he returned to the city of Aguascalientes. This was only the beginning of his travels. In 1904 he traveled to Italy for advanced musical studies at the Conservatorio Giovanni Battista Martini in Bologna.

He studied in Germany as a pupil of Martin Krause at the Stern conservatory in Berlin between 1906 and 1908.

=== Years at the National Conservatory ===
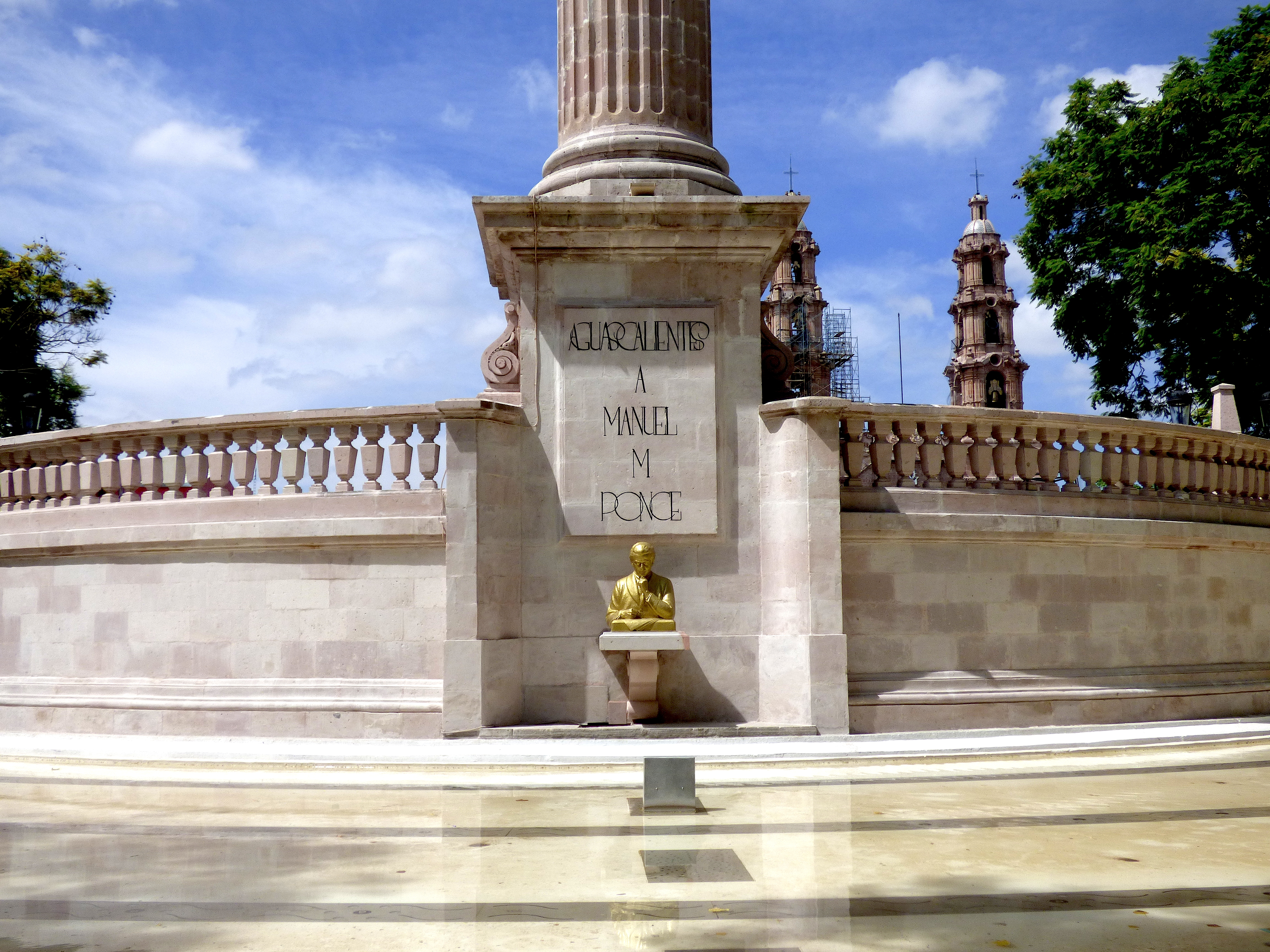
Monument to Manuel M. Ponce at the main square in the city of Aguascalientes, Mexico.

After his years abroad, Ponce returned to Mexico to teach piano and music history at the National Conservatory of Music from 1909 to 1915 and from 1917 to 1922. He spent the intervening years of 1915 to 1917 in Havana, Cuba.

In 1912 he composed his most famous work "Estrellita" (little star), which is not a normal love song, as is usually thought, but "Nostalgia Viva" (live nostalgia).

That same year, Ponce gave in the "Arbeau Theater" a memorable concert of Mexican popular music which, though it scandalized ardent defenders of European classical music, became a landmark in the history of the national song.

Heitor Villa-Lobos (1887–1959), who met Ponce in Paris in the 1920s, wrote

I remember that I asked him at that time if the composers of his country were as yet taking an interest in native music, as I had been doing since 1912, and he answered that he himself had been working in that direction. It gave me great joy to learn that in that distant part of my continent there was another artist who was arming himself with the resources of the folklore of his people in the struggle for the future musical independence of his country.

With valuable activity promoting music of the country and writing melodías like "Estrellita", "A la orilla de un palmar", "Alevántate", "La Pajarera", "Marchita el Alma" and "Una Multitud Más", Ponce gained the honorific title Creator of the Modern Mexican Song. He was also the first Mexican composer to project popular music onto the world stage: "Estrellita", for example, has been part of the repertoire of the main orchestras of the world and countless singers, although quite often the interpreter ignores the origin of the song as well as its author.

In 1947 he received the National Science and Arts Prize.

He was married to Clementina Maurel, next to whom he died in Mexico City. His body was buried in the Roundhouse of the Illustrious Men in the Pantheon of Dolores in Mexico City. A prominent monument to Ponce is found in the main square of Aguascalientes, the city where he grew up and first studied music.

=== Recordings by Ponce ===
Ponce participated in the following recordings:

- Manuel María Ponce: Concierto para piano y orquesta (Ponce on piano; Orquesta Sinfónica de México; conducted by Carlos Chávez) (Radio Mil, 1942)

Ponce recorded the following works on Duo-Art piano rolls between 1916 and 1920:

- 5789 Ponce - Mexican Barcarolle
- 5807 Ponce - Cuban Serenade
- 5924 Ponce - Mexican Serenade
- 5930 Ponce - Moonlight
- 5937 Ponce - Soñó mi Mente-Loca (Cuban Song)
- 6294 Ponce - Cuando viene la Primavera (When Spring Comes)

== Music ==
Ponce wrote music for solo instruments, chamber ensembles, and orchestra. His piano and guitar works outnumber those dedicated to other solo instruments within the set of pieces we know. Estrellita is Ponce's best known work.

=== Guitar music ===
Preludio in E major
Originally attributed to Sylvius Leopold Weiss. Performed on guitar by Jeff Carter

Ponce's guitar music is a core part of the instrument's repertory, the best-known works being Variations and Fugue on 'La Folia' (1929) and Sonatina meridional (1939). He also wrote a guitar concerto Concierto del Sur, which is dedicated to his long-time friend and guitar virtuoso Andrés Segovia. His last known work dedicated to Father Antonio Brambila, Variations on a Theme of Cabezón, was written in 1948, a few months before his death. It is unclear whether the variations are indeed based upon a theme by Antonio de Cabezón or if the theme was the work of Ponce's teacher, the organist Enrico Bossi. The following is only a select number of his most significant contributions.

- Scherzino Mexicano (1909) (originally written for piano)
- 24 Preludes
- Canciones populares mexicanas: La pajarera, Por ti mi corazón, La valentina (ca. 1925–1926)
- Sonata mexicana (1923)
- Thème varié et Finale (1926)
- Sonata No. 3 (1927)
- Sonata clásica (1928)
- Sonata romántica (1929)
- Suite in A minor (1929)
- Cuatro Piezas, including Mazurka and Valse
- Variations and Fugue on 'La Folia' (1929)
- Valse (1937)
- Sonatina meridional (1939)
- Variations on a Theme of Cabezón (1948)
- Dos Viñetas (posthumous)

It was Ponce who anonymously created the striking arrangement for guitar of J. S. Bach's Prelude from the first cello suite as performed and recorded by Segovia.

Ponce also composed a "Sonata for Guitar and Harpsichord." Segovia ascribed the Sonata's prelude to the lutenist and Bach contemporary S. L. Weiss. Segovia recorded this piece both as a solo and as a duet, performed with harpsichordist Rafael Puyana. Ponce is also, rather famously, the composer of "Suite Antigua in D by Alessandro Scarlatti" recorded by Segovia, for whom it was (knowingly) written, and also in part by John Williams and Manuel Lopez Ramoz amongst others. This deception finally came to light when it was observed that one of the movements went rather higher than was possible on the lute for which it was supposedly composed. The suite is, nevertheless, ravishingly beautiful. Alessandro Scarlatti was apparently chosen as the author because he had a creditable name but was (then) virtually unknown. A better bet than Sylvius Leopold Weiss, the purported composer of an earlier Ponce/Segovia pastiche, who alas turned out to be not, as supposed, unknown, but a friend of J S Bach and the pre-eminent composer of baroque lute works.

=== Piano works ===
Ponce, Intermezzo No. 1
Performed by Constantin Stephan

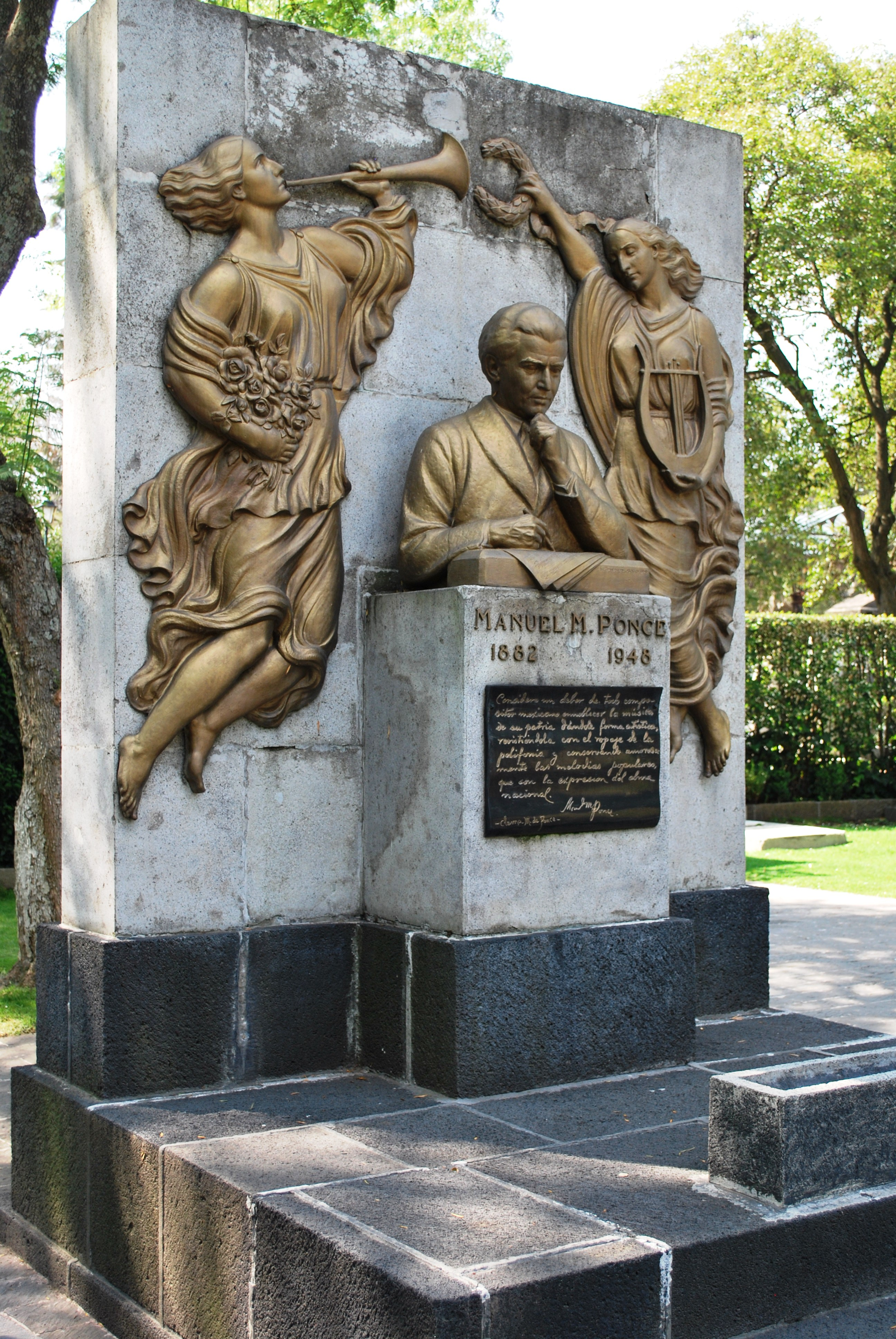
Tomb of Manuel M Ponce in the Panteon Civil de Dolores cemetery in Mexico City

- Suite Cubana
- Cuatro Danzas Mexicanas
- 3 Intermezzi
- Balada Mexicana (versions for piano solo and for piano & orchestra)
- Mazurcas
- Concierto romántico para piano y orquesta
- 4 Scherzinos
- Estudios de concierto
- Elegía de la ausencia
- Tema mexicano variado
- Rapsodia Cubana
- Rapsodias Mexicanas
- Preludio y fuga sobre un tema de Handel
- Preludios y fuga sobre un tema de Bach
- Sonata No. 2
- 5 Evocaciones
- Romanza de amor
- Suite bitonal

=== Songs ===
- "Adiós mi bien"
- "Aleluya"
- "Alevántate"
- "Cerca de tí"
- Cinco poemas chinos
- Cuatro poemas de F.A. de Icaza
- Dos poemas alemanes
- Dos poemas de B. Dávalos
- "Estrellita" (1912)
- "Forse"
- "Ho bisogno"
- "Insomnio"
- "Isaura de mi amor"
- "La pajarera"
- "Lejos de tí"
- "Lejos de tí" II
- "Marchita el alma"
- "Necesito"
- "Ofrenda"
- "Poema de primavera"
- "Por tí mi corazón"
- "Romanzeta"
- "Sperando, sognando"
- Seis poemas aracáicos
- Serenata mexicana
- "Soñó mi mente loca"
- "Tal vez"
- "Toi"
- Tres poemas de E. González Martínez
- Tres poemas de M. Brull
- Tres poemas de Lermontow
- Tres poemas de R. Tagore
- Tres poemas franceses
- "Tú"
- "Último ensueño"
- "Una multitud más"

==== Folk song arrangements ====
- "A la orilla de un palmar"
- "A ti va"
- "Acuérdate de mí"
- "Adiós mi bien"
- "Ah, que bonito"
- "Cerca de mí"
- "Cielito lindo"
- "Cuiden su vida"
- "China de mi alma"
- "De tres flores"
- "Dolores hay"
- "Dos seres hay"
- "El bracero"
- "El desterrado"
- "Estrella del norte"
- "Hace ocho meses"
- "La barca del marino"
- "La despedida"
- "La ola"
- "Palomita"
- "La palma"
- "La peña"
- "La visita"
- "Nunca, nunca"
- "Ojitos aceitunados"
- "Oye la voz"
- "Para amar sin consuelo"
- "Para qué quiero la vida"
- "Perdí un amor"
- "Perdida ya toda esperanza"
- "Pobre del hombre pobre"
- "Por esas calles"
- "Por tí mujer"
- "Que chulos ojos"
- "Que lejos ando"
- "Que pronto"
- "Quisiera morir"
- "Si alguna vez"
- "Si eres receuerdo"
- "Si alguna ser"
- "Son las horas"
- "Soy paloma errante"
- "Te amo"
- "Todo pasó"
- "Trigueña hermosa"
- "Valentina"
- "Ven oh luna"
- "Vengo a saber si tú me amas"
- "Voy a partir"
- "Ya sin tu amor"
- "Yo me propuse"
- "Yo mismo no comprendo"
- "Yo te quiero"

=== Chamber music ===
- Miniatures for string trio (1927)
- String Quartet (1932)
- Petite suite dans le style ancien (1933) for string trio
- Sonata a dúo for violin and viola (1936–1938)
- String Trio (1943)
- Trio romántico for piano trio
- Canción de otoño for violin and piano
- Cello Sonata
- Sonata for guitar and harpsichord
- Quartet for guitar and strings

=== Orchestral works ===
- Chapultepec
- Cantos y danzas de los antiguos mexicanos
- Estampas Nocturnas
- Instantáneas mexicanas
- Poema elegíaco
- Ferial

==== Concertos ====
- Concierto Romántico for piano and orchestra (1910)
- Concierto para piano No. 2 (1946, incomplete)
- Concierto del Sur for guitar and orchestra (1941)
- Violin Concerto (1943)

=== Notes about the works ===
An important group of Ponce's works were previously unknown to the public, as self-proclaimed heir Carlos Vázquez, a Mexican piano performer and educator who studied with Ponce, kept most of the original manuscripts in his possession. Most of them were finally donated to the National School of Music (UNAM) in Mexico City, as an analytic catalogue of his works could still be published.

Additionally, Vazquez donated parts of Ponce's belongings to the Manuel M. Ponce Museum in Zacatecas. Unfortunately, Vazquez died a few months before the opening of the museum.

One of Ponce's melodies still heard today in various arrangements is "Estrellita" (1912).

== Sources ==
- Corazón Otero: Manuel M. Ponce y la guitarra, Mexico 1980. First published in English by Musical New Services Limited, UK in 1983, 1994 ISBN 0-933224-84-2
- "Andrés Segovia, Manuel M. Ponce, Miguel Alcázar, Peter Segal: "The Segovia - Ponce Letters", Columbus, OH, Editions Orphée, 1989 ISBN 0-936186-29-1
- Ricardo Miranda Pérez, Grove Music Online
- Jorge Barrón Corvera: "Manuel María Ponce: A Bio-Bibliography", Westport, CT, Praeger, 2004 ISBN 0-313-31823-9
- Henderson, John. A Directory of Composers for Organ, Third Revised and Enlarged Edition. John Henderson (Publishing) Ltd., 2005, p. 585, ISBN 0-9528050-2-2, (Ponce entry page 585)
- Vinton, John ed. Dictionary of Contemporary Music, E.P. Dutton & Co., 1974, p. 581-582, ISBN 0-525-09125-4, (Ponce entry page 581 / page 582)
- Randel, Don Michael. Harvard Concise Dictionary of Music, The Belknap Press of Harvard University Press, 1978 (Second printing 1979), p. 397, ISBN 0-674-37471-1, (Ponce entry page 397)
