= Edoardo Ferrari-Fontana =

Italian tenor (1878–1936)

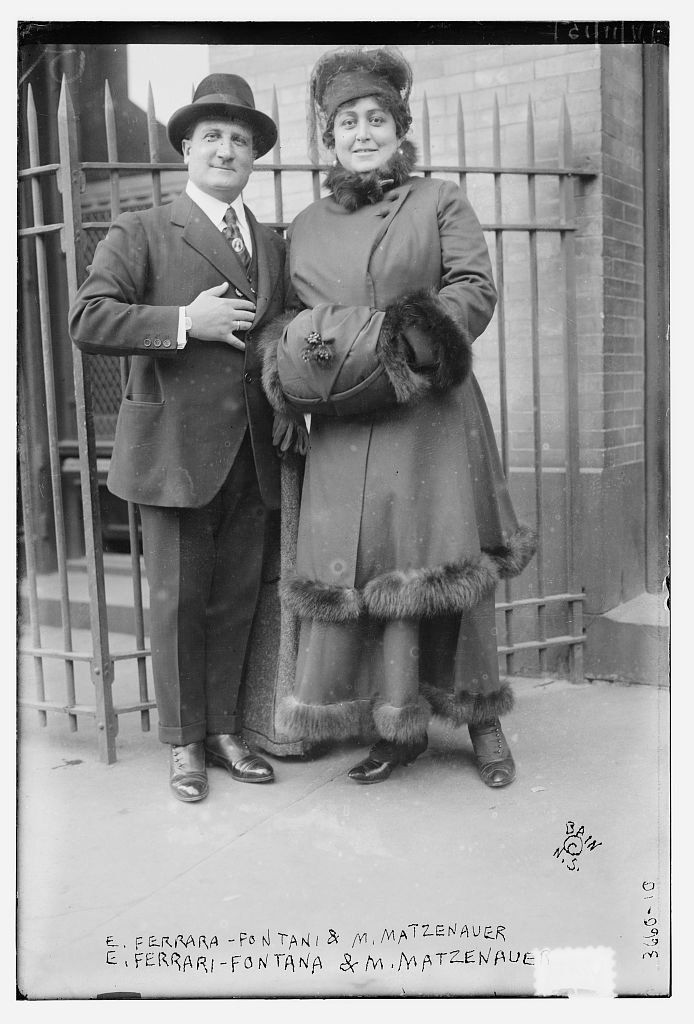
Edoardo Ferrari-Fontana and Margaret Matzenauer in 1915, at the stage entrance to the Metropolitan Opera

Edoardo Ferrari-Fontana (8 July 1878 – 4 July 1936) was an Italian Dramatic/lirico-spinto tenor. .

== Biography ==
He was born on 8 July 1878 in Rome, Italy. He married Margarete Matzenauer on 26 June 1912 at the Italian Club in Buenos Aires, Argentina, and they divorced in 1917. He later married Maria Esther Telle y Pastor. He had six children, including Adrienne Ferrari-Fontana (1914–2010).

His American debut was in Tristan und Isolde in Boston, Massachusetts when he was the only tenor available when the original lead singer left the country a day before the performance. In 1914, he made his debut at the Metropolitan Opera in the role of Avito in the United States Premiere of L'amore dei tre re by Italo Montemezzi, conducted by Arturo Toscanini. He had previously created the role in the world premiere at Teatro alla Scala under Tullio Serafin.

He moved to Toronto, Ontario, Canada in 1926 and died there on 4 July 1936.
