= Paquita Madriguera =

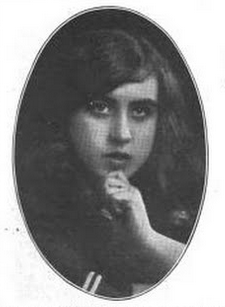
- Paquita Madriguera, from an advertisement for her American tour in 1916-1917.

Background information
- Born: 15 September 1900; Igualada
- Origin: Catalan, Spain
- Died: 2 November 1965 (aged 65)
- Genres: classical
- Instrument: pianist

Francisca "Paquita" Madriguera Rodon (15 September 1900 — 2 November 1965) was a Catalan pianist and composer, based for much of her adult life in Uruguay.

== Early life ==
Francisca Madriguera was born in Igualada, Barcelona, the daughter of Enric Madriguera Haase and Francesca Rodon Canudas. Her younger brother was violinist and conductor Enric Madriguera. She was a child prodigy on piano, and studied with Enrique Granados as a girl. At age 11 she gave a concert in Madrid. At age 13 she played at the Royal Albert Hall in London.

== Career ==
Madriguera toured American cities in 1916 and 1917, billed as "The Mozart of Spain." A reviewer in 1916 found her "interesting though ridiculously spoiled", explaining that "she is extremely talented, possesses a powerful touch and well-developed technique, and will no doubt be one of the established artists of tomorrow." In 1917 she played at a benefit concert in New York, for the National League for Women's Service. During that same stay in the United States, she gave a joint concert with her brother in Chicago's Aeolian Theatre. She gave another recital at the Aeolian Hall in New York in 1919. Madriguera made piano roll recordings of her playing in the 1910s.

Her promising career was suspended when she married in 1922 and went to live in Uruguay. In widowhood in 1932, she moved back to Spain with her three young daughters, and resumed her musical career. She married again, to fellow musician Andres Segovia, and they returned to Uruguay to live in 1937.

Compositions by Madriguera included Humorada for guitar.

== Personal life ==
Paquita Madriguera married lawyer and editor Arturo Puig in 1922 in Montevideo, Uruguay. They had three daughters, Paquita (born 1923), Sofia (born 1925), and Maria Rosa (born 1927). She was widowed in 1931. She married Spanish guitarist Andres Segovia in 1935, and they had a daughter Beatriz (1938–1967). They divorced in 1948. She died in 1965, and was buried in Montevideo's Central Cemetery.

There is a street in Igualada, Carrer de Paquita Madriguera, named after her.
