= Ordem do Mérito Cultural =

Brazilian national honour

Order of Cultural Merit Ordem do Mérito Cultural
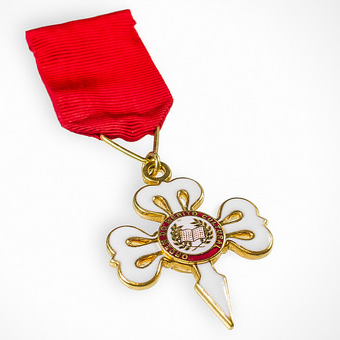

Awarded by the Ministry of Culture
- Type: National order
- Eligibility: Brazilian and foreign personalities
- Awarded for: people, artistic groups, initiatives or institutions in the form of recognition of their contributions to Brazilian Culture
- Status: currently awarded
- Grades: Grand Cross (Grã-cruz); Commander (Comendador); Knight (Cavaleiro)

The Ordem do Mérito Cultural is an honor bestowed by the Ministry of Culture to personalities, bodies both public and private, national and foreign, as a recognition of their contributions to Brazilian culture.

The award was established by Law No. 8313, 1991 and regulated in 1995 by the Federal Government through Decree 1,711. The OMC is celebrated annually on November 5, in celebration of the National Culture Day.

The Ordem do Mérito Cultural recipients are selected by a Council composed of the Minister of State for Culture, who presides as Chancellor, and the Ministers of State for Education, Science, Technology and Innovation and Foreign Affairs, and on a Technical Commission, nominated by the Minister of State for Culture.

== Ordem do Mérito Cultural ==
In the MinC site can indicate all persons or entities, national or international, with significant contributions to Brazilian culture. When the contributions are concluded, the suggested names are examined by the Council of the Order of Merit. Since 1995, over 500 personalities were honored in three classes – Grand Cross; Comendador and Cavaleiro-, as well as 60 institutions received the medal without grade classes. After the nomination period, the Technical Commission shall issue a conclusive opinion before submitting it for consideration by the Council of the Order of Cultural Merit. After approval of the names by the Council, the President of the Republic accepts and promotes the personalities and institutions in the OMC by means of Presidential Decree.

== Characteristics ==
The Order has three classes: Grand Cross; Commander and Knight. The President will be the Grand Master of the Order and the Minister of State for Culture, Chancellor. It is possible for the same person to receive the award more than once, but in different classes. The bodies both public and private, domestic and foreign, are admitted to the Order without grade classes.

- Grã-Cruz (Grand Cross)
- Comendador (Commander)
- Cavaleiro (Knight)

=== Insignia ===
It is a cross of St. James of the Sword enamelled profiled of white gold. In the center, an open book carved gold over a laurel wreath surrounded by the legend "Ordem do Mérito Cultural".

Grand Cross

Silk grosgrain band chamalotada purple, pending insignia in the loop. Plate with gold glow under the banner.

Commander

Tape average chamalotada silk grosgrain purple, pending insignia in the center.

Knight

Narrow ribbon of silk grosgrain chamalotada purple, pending insignia on the tip end.

Ribbon bars
Knight	Commander	Grand Cross

== Recipients ==
Since its inception in 1995, more than 500 people were honored in three classes and more than 60 institutions received the medal without grade classes for their contributions to the development of culture in the country.

There are intellectuals, producers and artists from various cultural segments and recognized works of social inclusion, art and education. Recipients include Olga Praguer Coelho, Milton Nascimento, Rita Lee, Lygia Fagundes Telles, Athos Bulcão, Fernando and Humberto Campana, Celso Furtado, Lúcio Costa, Ariano Suassuna, Cesária Évora, Carmen Miranda, Raul Seixas, Zuzu Angel, Vinicius de Moraes, Nelson Rodrigues, the Brazilian Academy of Letters, Clarice Lispector, Antônio Fagundes, and Judith Malina.
