= Gabriella Besanzoni =

Italian opera singer

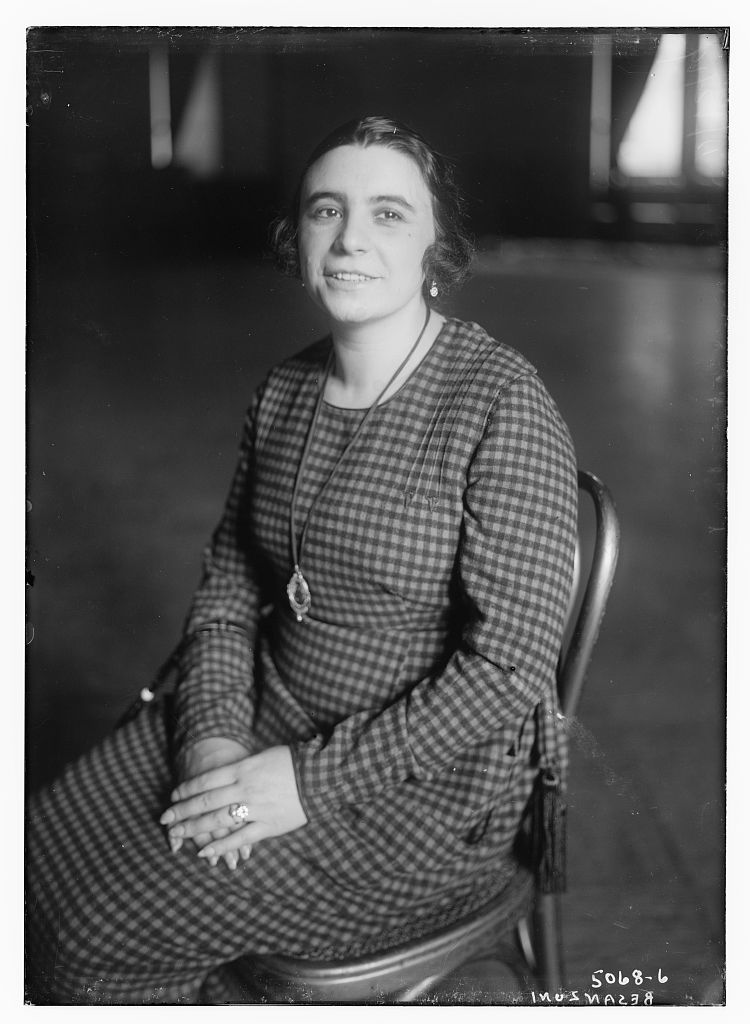
- Gabriella Besanzoni in 1919 in chair

Background information
- Born: 20 September 1888; Rome, Italy
- Died: 8 July 1962 (aged 73)
- Occupation: Opera singer
- Years active: 1911–1939
- Labels: Victor
- Spouse: Henrique Lage (m. 1925; died 1941) (m. 1956)

Gabriella Besanzoni (20 September 1888 – 8 July 1962) was an Italian opera singer (mezzo-soprano and contralto).

== Early life ==
Gabriella Besanzoni was born in Rome and studied at the Accademia Nazionale di Santa Cecilia.

== Career ==
Gabriella Besanzoni (photo with 1958 dedication)

Besanzoni had her debut at Viterbo in 1911. From 1918 she was a star of the Teatro Colón of Buenos Aires, with regular appearances in other South American cities, especially Rio de Janeiro. Her debut in the United States happened in 1919, when she sang Amneris in Aida with Claudia Muzio, Giovanni Martinelli, and Renato Zanelli. That same season, she starred with Enrico Caruso in productions of Samson et Dalila and La Forza del Destino at the Metropolitan Opera. The pair were appearing together in Aida in Havana in 1920 when a bomb exploded in the auditorium during the second act of the final performance.

She left the Teatro Colón in 1935, and held her farewell concert in Rome in 1939, singing Carmen at the Baths of Caracalla. She made several recordings for Victor, and appeared in one Italian silent film, Stefania (1916). She taught young singers in Brazil during her marriage, and also taught voice in Rome in her later years.

Tenor Giacomo Lauri Volpi mentioned her in his Voci parallele as one of the only three real contraltos he had chanced to meet throughout his career (the others being Margaret Matzenauer and Matilde Blanco Sadun).

== Personal life ==
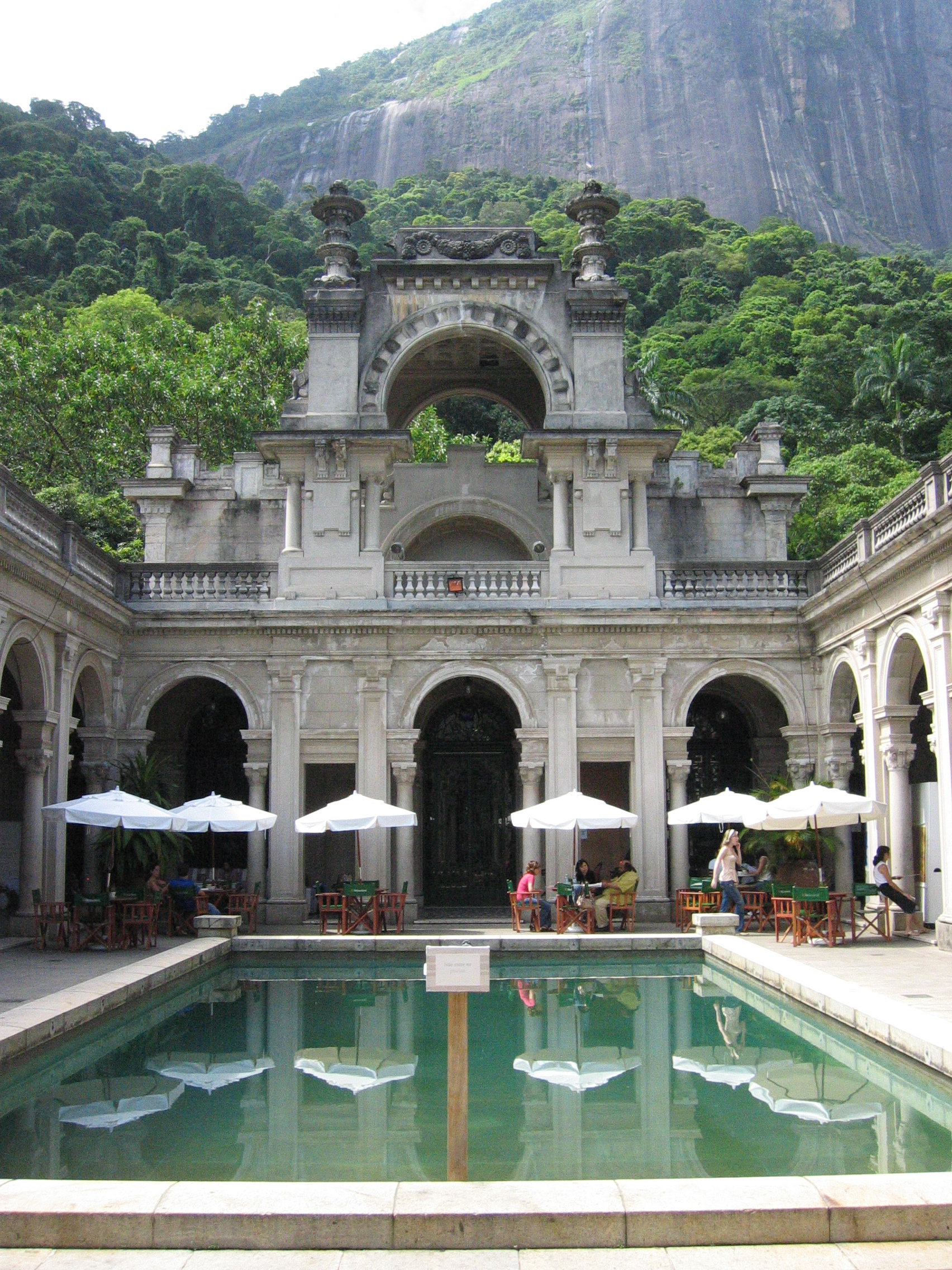
Parque Lage, formerly the residence of Besanzoni in Rio de Janeiro

Besanzoni and pianist Arthur Rubinstein were romantically involved in 1918 when both were working in Madrid, Buenos Aires, and New York. Besanzoni married Brazilian industrialist Henrique Lage in 1925. The couple lived in Rio de Janeiro; their grand home and gardens are now known as Parque Lage, a public park. Besanzoni was widowed in 1941; she married again in 1956, and she died in Italy in 1962, aged 73. She was buried in one of her Carmen costumes.
