= Música en Compostela =

Annual summer course in music performance and composition in Spain

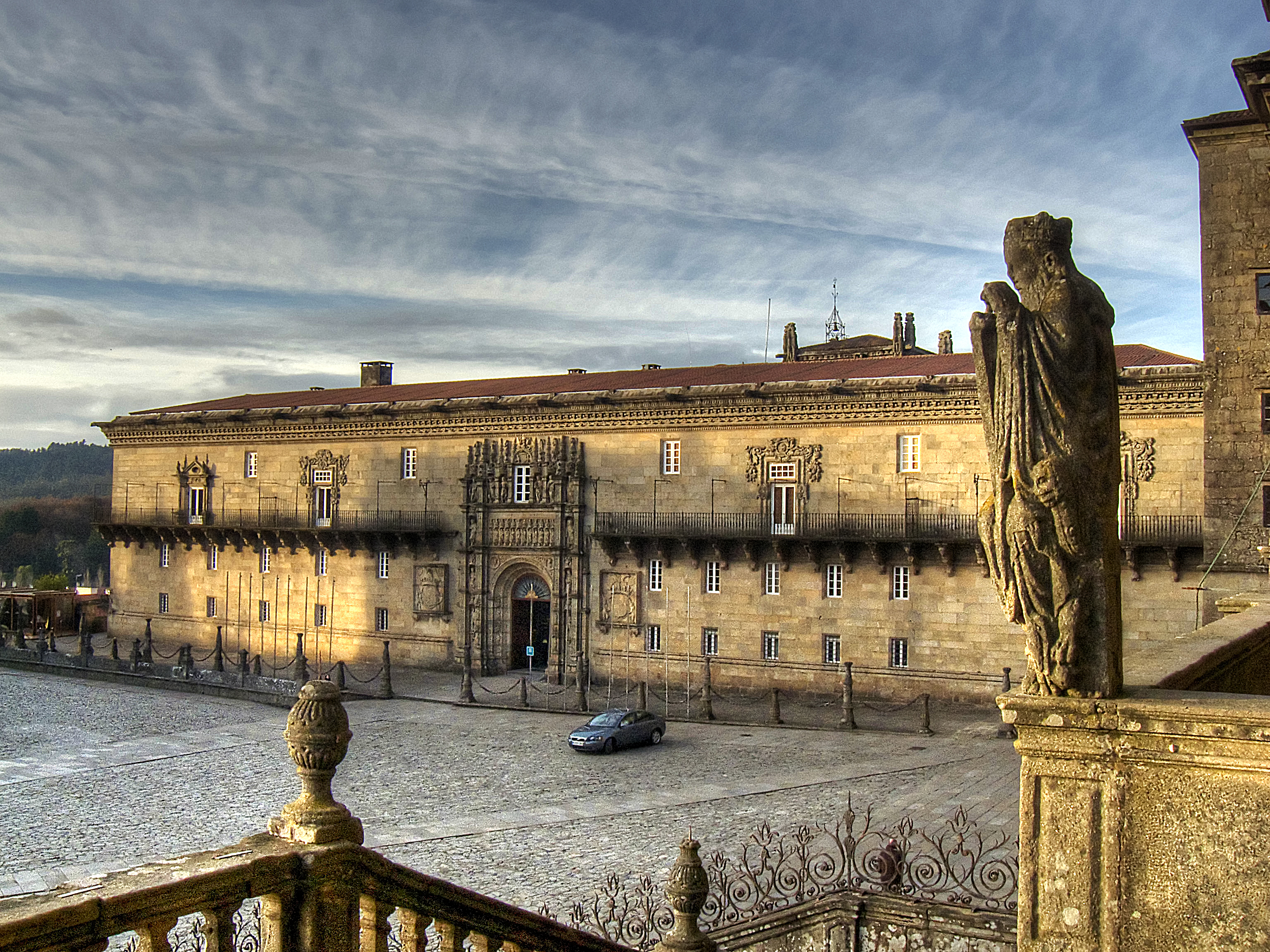
The Hostal de los Reyes Católicos in Santiago de Compostela where the Música en Compostela courses were originally held

Música en Compostela (Music in Compostela) is an annual summer course in music performance and composition held in Santiago de Compostela, Spain. It was founded by the Spanish guitarist Andrés Segovia and the diplomat José Miguel Ruiz Morales in 1958. The goal of the founders was to foster the appreciation of Spanish classical music and give students from both Spain and abroad the opportunity to study under some of the country's most prominent musicians and composers. Segovia's masterclasses at Compostela, like those at the Accademia Musicale Chigiana in Siena, were considered "a virtual necessity for aspiring guitar virtuosos." Over the years, composers Óscar Esplá, Federico Mompou, Xavier Montsalvatge, and Joaquín Rodrigo, pianist Alicia de Larrocha, and singers Victoria de los Angeles, Montserrat Caballé and Conchita Badía have also taught courses there.

== Sources ==
- Debén, Carmen, El Hostal de los Reyes Católicos en la historia de Santiago, Editorial Everest, 1968
- Estévez, José Luis, "50 años de 'Música en Compostela'", El País, 9 August 2007
- Henahan, Donal, "Segovia, master guitarist, dies ", North Carolina Times-News (via New York Times News Service), 4 June 1987
- La Voz de Galicia, "Los cursos Música en Compostela celebran sus bodas de oro con 125 alumnos en la capilla del Hostal", 5 August 2007
- López-Calo, José (2001). "Santiago de Compostela". In Sadie, Stanley; Tyrrell, John (eds.). The New Grove Dictionary of Music and Musicians (2nd ed.). London: Macmillan Publishers. ISBN 978-1-56159-239-5.
- Viz, Adriana, "Enrique Jiménez: “Tenemos la intención de que Música en Compostela dure una semana más”", El Correo Gallego, 16 August 2009
