= Andrés Segovia =

Spanish guitarist (1893–1987)

The Most Illustrious Andrés Segovia
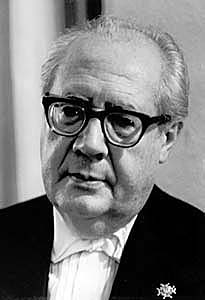
- Segovia in 1963
- Born: Andrés Segovia Torres; 21 February 1893; Linares, Jaén, Spain
- Died: 2 June 1987 (aged 94); Madrid, Spain
- Occupation: Guitarist
- Years active: 1909–1987
- Website: Official website

Andrés Segovia Torres, (Note: Spanish pronunciation: [anˈdɾes seˈɣoβja ˈtores]) 1st Marquis of Salobreña (21 February 1893 – 2 June 1987), was a Spanish virtuoso classical guitarist. Many professional classical guitarists were either students of Segovia or students of Segovia's students. Segovia's contribution to the modern-romantic repertoire included not only commissions but also his own transcriptions of classical or baroque works. He is remembered for his expressive performances: his wide palette of tone, and his distinctive musical personality, phrasing and style.

== Early life ==
Segovia was born on 21 February 1893 in Linares, Jaén. He was sent at a very young age to live with his uncle Eduardo and aunt María. Eduardo arranged for Segovia's first music lessons with a violin teacher after he had recognised that Segovia had an aptitude for music. That proved to be an unhappy introduction to music for the young Segovia because of the teacher's strict methods, and Eduardo stopped the lessons. His uncle decided to move to Granada to allow Segovia to obtain a better education. After arriving in Granada, Segovia recommenced his musical studies. Segovia was aware of flamenco during his formative years as a musician but stated that he "did not have a taste" for the form and chose instead the works of Fernando Sor, Francisco Tárrega, and other classical composers. Tárrega agreed to give the self-taught Segovia some lessons but died before they could meet, and Segovia states that his early musical education involved the "double function of professor and pupil in the same body".

== Career ==
Segovia's first public performance was in Granada at the age of 16 in 1909. A few years later he played his first professional concert in Madrid, which included works by Francisco Tárrega and his own guitar transcriptions of Johann Sebastian Bach. Despite the discouragement of his family, who wanted him to become a lawyer, and criticism by some of Tárrega's pupils for his idiosyncratic technique, he continued to pursue his studies of the guitar diligently.

He played again in Madrid in 1912, at the Paris Conservatory in 1915 and in Barcelona in 1916 and made a successful tour of South America in 1919. Segovia's arrival on the international stage coincided with a time when the guitar's fortunes as a concert instrument were being revived, largely through the efforts of Miguel Llobet. It was in that changing milieu that Segovia, thanks to his strength of personality and artistry, coupled with developments in recording and broadcasting, succeeded in making the guitar more popular again.

In 1921 in Paris, Segovia met Alexandre Tansman, who later wrote a number of guitar works for Segovia, among them Cavatina, which won a prize at the Siena International Composition contest in 1952. In 1921, he also met Agustín Barrios in Buenos Aires, Argentina. Segovia was impressed by Barrios's Bach-inspired and arguably magnum opus La Catedral.

At Granada in 1922, he became associated with the Concurso de Cante Jondo, promoted by the Spanish composer Manuel de Falla. The aim of the "classicising" Concurso was to preserve flamenco in its purity from being distorted by modern popular music. Segovia had already developed as a fine tocador of flamenco guitar, yet his direction was now classical. Invited to open the Concurso held at the Alhambra, he played Homenaje a Debussy by Falla.

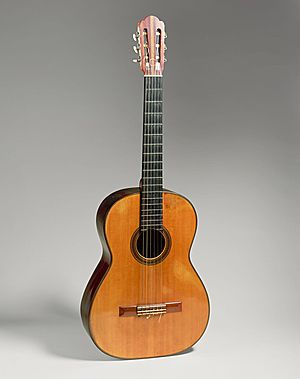
Guitar by Hermann Hauser, 1937, Munich, Germany. Concert guitar of Andrés Segovia's from 1937 until 1962. Gift of Emilita Segovia, Marquesa of Salobreña, 1986 (1986.353.1). Housed in the Metropolitan Museum of Art.

In 1923, Segovia visited Mexico for the first time. There Manuel Ponce was so impressed with the concert that he wrote a review in El Universal. Later Ponce went on to write many works for Segovia, including numerous sonatas.

In 1924, Segovia, visited the German luthier Hermann Hauser Sr. after Segovia heard some of Hauser's instruments played in a concert in Munich. In 1928, Hauser provided Segovia with one of the guitars, which Segovia used during his tour of the United States and in other concerts up to 1933. Segovia ordered a further guitar from Hauser and after receiving it passed on the 1928 model to his American representative and close friend Sophocles Papas, who in his turn gave it to his student, the famous jazz and classical guitarist Charlie Byrd, who used it on several records.

Segovia's first American tour was arranged in 1928 when Fritz Kreisler, the Viennese violinist who privately played the guitar, persuaded Francis Charles Coppicus from the Metropolitan Musical Bureau to present the guitarist in New York.

After Segovia's debut tour in the US in 1928 the Brazilian composer Heitor Villa-Lobos composed his now well-known Twelve Études (Portuguese: Doze estudos; French: Douze études; German: Zwölf Studien) and later dedicated them to Segovia. Their relationship proved to be lasting, and Villa-Lobos continued to write for Segovia. He also transcribed numerous classical pieces himself and revived the pieces transcribed by predecessors like Tárrega.

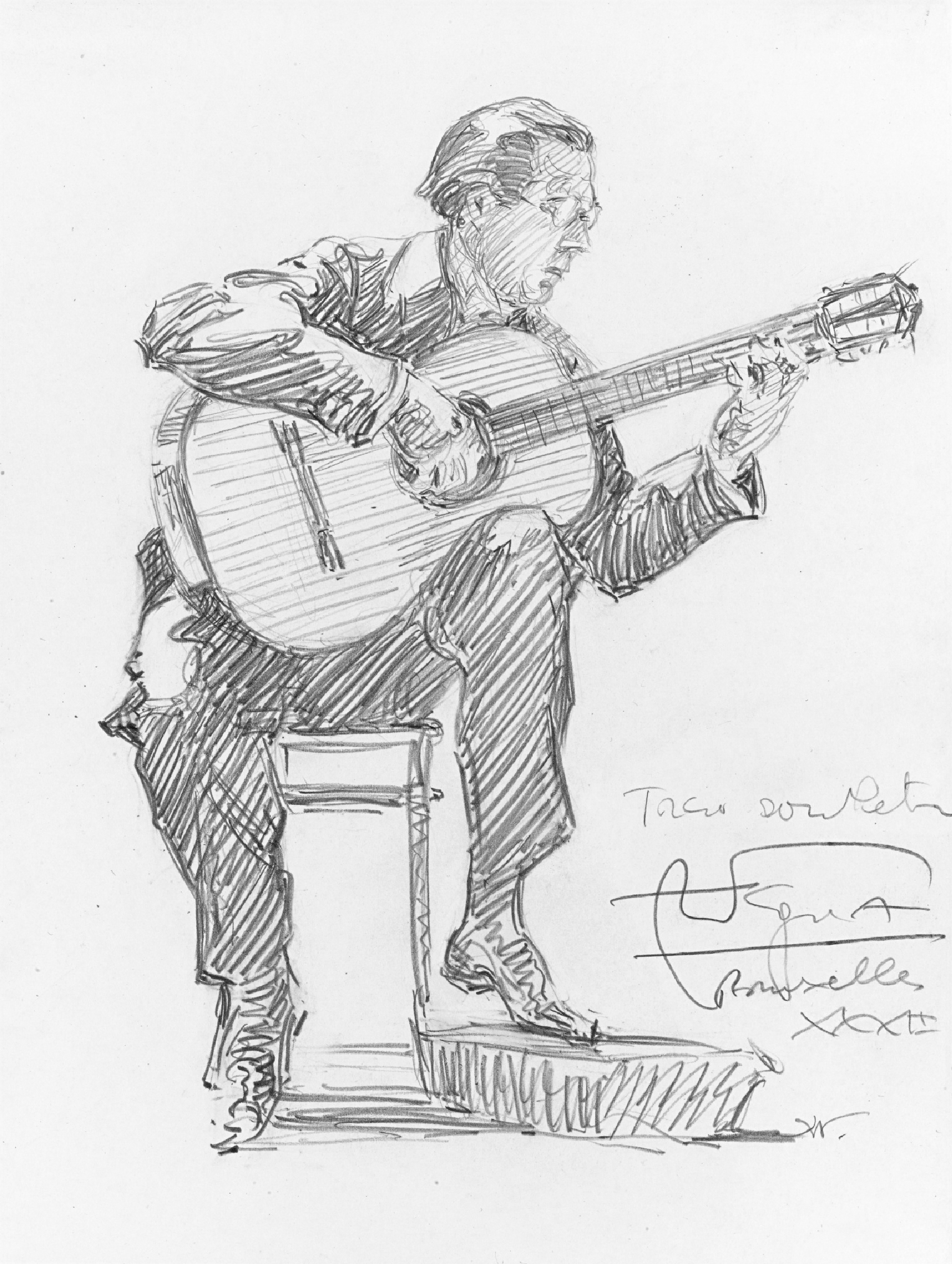
Segovia at a recital in the "Concerts Ysaye" in Brussels, 15 December 1932 (Hilda Wiener, 1877–1940)

In 1932, Segovia met and befriended the composer Mario Castelnuovo-Tedesco in Venice. Since Castelnuovo-Tedesco did not play the guitar, Segovia provided him with guitar compositions (Ponce's Folias variations and Sor's Mozart Variations), which he could study. Castelnuovo-Tedesco composed a large number of works for the guitar, many of them dedicated to Segovia. The Concerto Op. 99 of 1939 was the first guitar concerto of the 20th century and Castelnuovo-Tedesco's last work in Italy before he emigrated to the United States. It was premiered by Segovia in Uruguay in 1939.

In 1935, he gave his first public performance of Bach's Chaconne, a difficult piece for any instrument. He moved to Montevideo and performed many concerts in South America in the 1930s and the early 1940s.

After World War II, Segovia began to record more frequently and performed regular tours of Europe and America and would maintain that schedule for 30 years. In 1954, Joaquín Rodrigo dedicated Fantasía para un gentilhombre (Fantasy for a Gentleman) to Segovia. Segovia won the 1958 Grammy Award for Best Classical Performance, Instrumentalist for his recording Segovia Golden Jubilee.

John W. Duarte dedicated his English Suite Op. 31 to Segovia and his wife, Emilia Magdalena del Corral Sancho, on the occasion of their marriage in 1962. Segovia told the composer "You will be astonished at the success it will have".

In recognition of his contributions to music and the arts, Segovia was ennobled on 24 June 1981 by King Juan Carlos I, who gave Segovia the hereditary title of Marqués de Salobreña (English: Marquis of Salobreña) in the nobility of Spain.

Segovia continued performing into his old age, and lived in semi-retirement during his seventies and eighties on the Costa del Sol. Two films were made of his life and work, one when he was 75 and the other when he was 84. They are available on DVD under the titles Andrés Segovia—in Portrait. His final RCA LP (ARL1-1602), Reveries, was recorded in Madrid in June 1977.

In 1984, Segovia was the subject of a 13-part series broadcast on National Public Radio, Segovia! The series was recorded on location in Spain, France and the United States. Hosted by Oscar Brand, the series was produced by Jim Anderson, Robert Malesky and Larry Snitzler.

Segovia died on 2 June 1987 in Madrid of a heart attack at the age of 94. He is buried at Casa Museo Andrés Segovia in Linares.

== Technique ==
When asked which technique he used, fingertips or fingernails, Segovia replied that it was "the only one there is: nails. Because they bring timbre differences and colour variation and give sonorous volume to the guitar." His right hand was placed so that the fingers were perpendicular to the strings. At the same time, it was thought that was the only way to avoid unpleasant noise coming from the low strings (E, A and D) of the guitar when they were plucked.

In spite of his technique, and largely because of the flexibility that he had in his thumb, Segovia was able to create a very strong and voluminous sound in the bass notes.

Another innovation that separated Segovia from the Tárrega school was the search for the tension in the strings by placing his right hand further to the right side. That way, he could obtain colour variation but also an especially strong, round and voluminous sound, which was very helpful for giving concerts in big halls (the technique was later used by Narciso Yepes). Before Segovia, guitarists from the Tárrega school played the guitar with the hand right over the soundhole and thus created a mellow sound but could not fill the whole space of a large concert hall.

After World War II, Segovia became among the first to endorse nylon strings, instead of catgut strings. That advancement allowed for greater tonal stability and was the final ingredient in the standardization of the instrument.

== Repertoire ==
Segovia's repertoire consisted of three principal pillars: first, contemporary works, including concertos and sonatas, usually specifically written for Segovia himself by composers with whom he forged working relationships, notably Federico Moreno Torroba, Federico Mompou, and Joaquín Rodrigo, the Mexican composer Manuel Ponce, the Italian composer Mario Castelnuovo-Tedesco, and the great Brazilian composer Heitor Villa-Lobos; second, transcriptions, usually made by Segovia himself, of classical works originally written for other instruments (e.g., lute, harpsichord, piano, violin, cello) by Johann Sebastian Bach, Isaac Albéniz, Enrique Granados, and many other prominent composers; third, traditional classical guitar works by composers such as Fernando Sor and Francisco Tárrega. Segovia's influence enlarged the repertoire, mainly as a commissioner or dedicatee of new works, as a transcriber, and as a composer with such works as his Estudio sin luz.

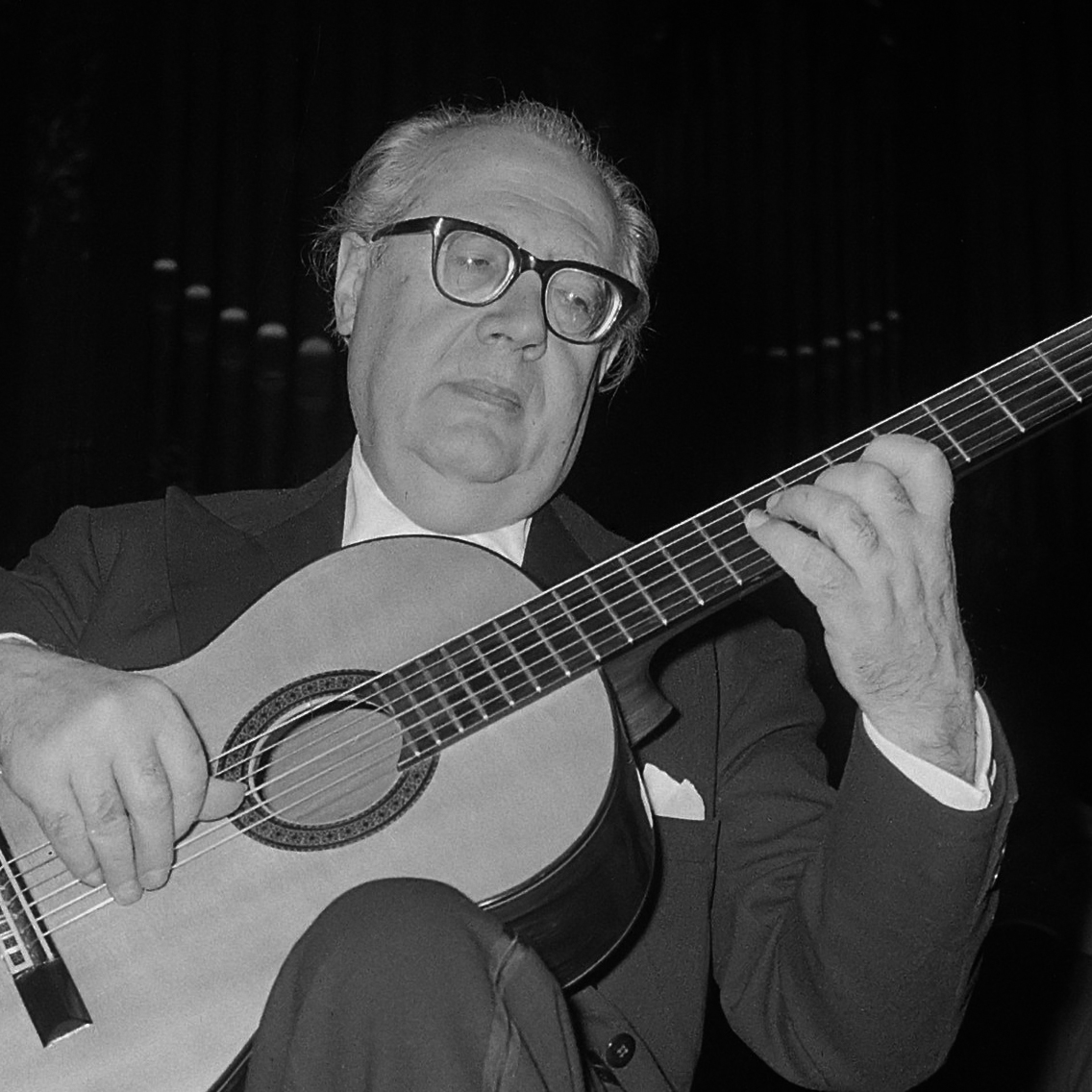
Segovia in 1962

Segovia's main musical aesthetic preferences were music of the early 20th century (and turn of the century) especially in the Spanish romantic-modern and nationalist style. That is perhaps best typified by Segovia's own work Estudio sin Luz. Many works of that and similar styles were written especially for him and formed part of his core repertoire: particularly the guitar works of Federico Moreno Torroba (1891–1982), such as the Sonatina, which was first performed by Segovia in Paris in 1925.

Segovia was selective and performed only works with which he identified personally. He was known to reject atonal works or those that he considered too radical even if they were dedicated to him; he rejected Frank Martin's Quatre pièces brèves, Darius Milhaud's Segoviana, etc. Even though rejected by Segovia, many of those works were published and available as of 2001.

== Teaching ==
Segovia viewed teaching as vital to his mission of propagating the guitar and gave master classes throughout his career. His most famous master classes took place at Música en Compostela, in the Spanish city of Santiago de Compostela. In 1964 Segovia gave his first master class at the University of California, Berkeley, from 20 July to 14 August. The selected performers on the course (necessarily under 30 years old on 1 July to be eligible) were Guillermo Fierens (Argentina), Oscar Ghiglia, Aldo Minella (Italy), Michael Lorimer, Ako Ito, Christopher Parkening, George Sakellariou, Lisa Hurlong, Corrado Mezzina (USA), Luis Felipe Chavarría and Leticia Alba (Mexico).

Segovia also taught at the Accademia Musicale Chigiana in Siena for numerous years, where he was aided by Alirio Díaz.

His teaching style is a source of controversy among some of his former students, who considered it to be dogmatically authoritarian. One of Segovia's most celebrated former students of the classical guitar, John Williams, has said that Segovia bullied students into playing only his style and stifled the development of their own styles. Williams has also said that Segovia was dismissive of music that did not have what Segovia considered the correct classical origins, such as South American music with popular roots. He was also critical of Williams' work with the group Sky for the same reasons.

== Legacy ==
Segovia received many honors, awards, and prizes, and can be considered a catalytic figure in granting respectability to the guitar as a serious concert instrument capable of evocativeness and depth of interpretation.

Federico Moreno Torroba said, "The musical interpreter who fascinates me the most is Andrés Segovia." He can be credited to have dignified the classical guitar as a legitimate concert instrument before the discerning music public, which had hitherto viewed the guitar merely as a limited if sonorous parlour instrument.

=== Influence ===
Segovia influenced a generation of classical guitarists who built on his technique and musical sensibility, including Christopher Parkening, Julian Bream, John Williams and Oscar Ghiglia, all of whom have acknowledged their debt to him. Further, Segovia left behind a large body of edited works and transcriptions for classical guitar, including several transcriptions of Bach, particularly an extraordinarily-demanding classical guitar transcription of the Chaconne from the 2nd Partita for Violin (BWV 1004). During his lifetime, guitarists were eager to claim association with Segovia, who suggested that he had not actually taught as many students as has been claimed. He once said, "All over the world I have 'pupils' I have never met."

His editions of works originally written for guitar include newly-fingered and occasionally-revised versions of works from the standard repertoire (most famously, his edition of a selection of twenty estudios by Fernando Sor, the "cornerstone" of every serious student's technique since its publication in 1945 although somewhat ironically, Segovia, in the preface to that work, disparaged Sor as "not among the vigorous talents") as well as compositions written for him, including by Heitor Villa-Lobos, Federico Mompou, and Mario Castelnuovo-Tedesco.

=== Awards, honours, and prizes ===
Segovia received ten doctorates honoris causa from universities the world over.

On 24 June 1981, he was ennobled by King Juan Carlos I, who gave Segovia the hereditary title of Marqués de Salobreña (English: Marquis of Salobreña) in the nobility of Spain in recognition of his contributions to music and the arts.

He received the Danish Sonning Award in 1974, the Ernst von Siemens Music Prize in 1985, and a Grammy Lifetime Achievement Award in 1986.

Segovia's birthplace of Linares established the Segovia Museum "Fundación Andrés Segovia" in May 1995, and has a bronze statue in his honour, created by Julio López Hernández and unveiled on 25 May 1984.

The main-belt asteroid 3822 Segovia was named in Segovia's memory in 1989.

A competition co-sponsored by the European Guitar Teachers Association is named after Segovia.

== Personal life ==
Segovia's first wife was Adelaida Portillo (marriage in 1918). Segovia's second wife (marriage in 1935) was the pianist Paquita Madriguera, who also made some piano roll recordings. From 1944, he maintained a romantic relationship with Brazilian singer and guitarist Olga Praguer Coelho, which was to last for over a decade. In 1962 Segovia married Emilia Magdalena Corral Sancho. They had one son, Carlos Andrés Segovia, the current Marquis of Salobreña.

== Partial discography ==
- Guitar Solos – Decca, 1949.
- An Evening With Andres Segovia – Decca, 1954 (Grammy Hall of Fame Award 1999).
- Golden Jubilee, 2 volumi – Brunswick, 1958–60 (Grammy Award for Best Instrumental Soloist Performance (without orchestra) 1958).
- Ingterpreta: Granados, Albéniz, Scarlatti, Paganini – Deutsche Grammophon, 1961.
- Segovia plays Bach – Saga, 1969.
- Castles of Spain – Decca, 1970.
- El arte de Andrés Segovia – MCA, 1970.
- Fantasia para un Gentilhombre – MCA, 1972.
- Recital intimo – Intercord, 1975.
- The Segovia Collection, 9 volumi – MCA, 1989–91
  - Vol. 1: The Legendary Andrés Segovia in an All-Bach Program
  - Vol. 2: The Legendary Andrés Segovia plays "Fantasia para un Gentilhombre", "Concierto del Sur", "Castles of Spain"
  - Vol. 3: The Legendary Andrés Segovia: my Favorite Works
  - Vol. 4: The Legendary Andrés Segovia: The Baroque Guitar
  - Vol. 5: The Legendary Andrés Segovia: five centuries of the Spanish Guitar
  - Vol. 6: The Legendary Andrés Segovia: Ponce sonatas
  - Vol. 7: The Legendary Andrés Segovia: Guitar etudes
  - Vol. 8: The Legendary Andrés Segovia: Mario Castelnuovo-Tedesco
  - Vol. 9: "The Legendary Andrés Segovia: The Romantic Guitar"
- The complete 1949 London Recordings – Testament, 1994.
- The complete Early Recordings (1927–1939) – Fono Enterprise, 1997.
- The Art of Segovia – Deutsche Grammophon, 2002.
- The Segovia Collection, 4 volumi – Deutsche Grammophon, 2003.
  - Vol. 1: Rodrigo, Boccherini, Ponce
  - Vol. 2: Rodrigo, Ponce, Castelnuovo-Tedesco, Torroba, Mompou
  - Vol. 3: Albeniz, Granados, Sanz, Sor
  - Vol. 4: Johann Sebastian Bach
- Andres Segovia: 1950s American Recordings – Naxos, 2007.
- Ponce: "Concierto del Sur". Rodrigo: "Fantasia para un Gentilhombre" – Naxos, 2012.
- Segovia – Guitar Music, compositions by Segovia performed by Alberto La Rocca – CD Brilliant Classics, 2016. Contains: 11 Preludios, Estudio en mi mayor, Estudio para Deli, Recordando a Deli, Estudios, Estudio-Vals, Estudio sin luz, Improntu, Two Pieces, Veintitrés canciones populares de distintos paìses.

== Compositions ==
- Estudio en mi mayor (1921)
- Estudio para Deli (1938)
- Estudio sin luz (1954)
- Estudio-Vals (1960)
- Recordando a Deli - Estudio para sus deditos inteligentes (1960)
- Impromptu
- Estudios ("Daily Studies")
  1. Oraciòn
  2. Remembranza
- Two Pieces
  1. Estudio
  2. Humorada (composed by Paquita Madriguera)
- Preludios
  - Preludio n. 1
  - Preludio n. 2 - Fatiga
  - Preludio n. 3 - Leòn
  - Preludio n. 4
  - Preludio n. 5 - Preludio a Deli
  - Preludio n. 6 - Preludio en si menor (1959)
  - Preludio n. 7 - Preludio madrileño (1936)
  - Preludio n. 8 - Preludio sobre un tema de Aparicio Méndez (1962)
  - Preludio n. 9
  - Preludio n. 10
  - Preludio n. 11 - Vara (1950)
- 3 Preludios
- Prelude in Chords
- Preludio (a Vladimir Bobri)
- Veintitrés canciones populares de distintos paìses (1941):
  1. Inglesa
  2. Escocesa
  3. Irlandesa
  4. Rusa
  5. Rusa
  6. Tscheca
  7. Polaca
  8. Polaca
  9. Finlandesa
  10. Finlandesa
  11. Serbia
  12. Serbia
  13. Croata
  14. Croata
  15. Eslovania
  16. Sueca
  17. Bretona
  18. Vasca
  19. Catalana
  20. Catalana
  21. Catalana
  22. Francesa
  23. Catalana
- 5 Anécdotas:
  1. Allegretto
  2. Allegro moderato con grazia
  3. Lento malinconico
  4. Molto tranquillo
  5. Allegretto vivo
- Neblina
- Macarena
- Fandango de la madrugada (1945)
- For Carl Sandburg
- Tonadilla
- Allegro (Para Doña Paz Armesto di Quiroga)
- Four Easy Lessons
- Lessons Nos. 11 & 12
- Divertimento (for two guitars)

== Students ==
Segovia had several notable students throughout his career:

- Lily Afshar
- Liona Boyd
- Julian Bream
- Charlie Byrd
- Abel Carlevaro
- Charo
- Alirio Díaz
- Eliot Fisk
- Oscar Ghiglia
- Adam Holzman
- Michael Laucke
- Antonio Membrado
- Christopher Parkening
- John Williams

== See also ==
- Michele Pittaluga International Classical Guitar Competition, founded with his support

== Bibliography ==
- Alberto López Poveda: Andrés Segovia – Vida y Obra (2010; Tome1: 864 pages; Tome2: 408 pages) (1, 2 Archived 14 August 2011 at the Wayback Machine), 2009
- Alfredo Escande: Don Andrés y Paquita – La vida de Segovia en Montevideo
- The Segovia-Ponce Letters Archived 17 September 2011 at the Wayback Machine
- Andrés Segovia. Un secolo di storia nella musica del grande chitarrista spagnolo Archived 22 July 2011 at the Wayback Machine (2005)
- Graham Wade: Traditions of the Classical Guitar(John Calder, London, 1980)
- Graham Wade: Segovia – A Celebration of the Man and his Music (Allison & Busby, London, 1983)
- Graham Wade: Maestro Segovia (Robson, London, 1986)
- Graham Wade and Gerard Garno: A New Look at Segovia, His Life, His Music, Volumes 1 & 2 (Mel Bay Publications Inc., Pacific, Missouri, 1997)
- Graham Wade: A Concise History of the Classic Guitar (Mel Bay Publications Inc., Pacific, Missouri, 2001)
- Machilis, Joseph. The Enjoyment of Music: An Introduction to Perceptive Listening. New York: W.W Norton and Company, 1977, Pages 107–109.

Spanish nobility
New title	Marquess of Salobreña; 1981–1987	Succeeded by Carlos Andrés Segovia
