= Francis Charles Coppicus =

American music administrator (1880–1966)

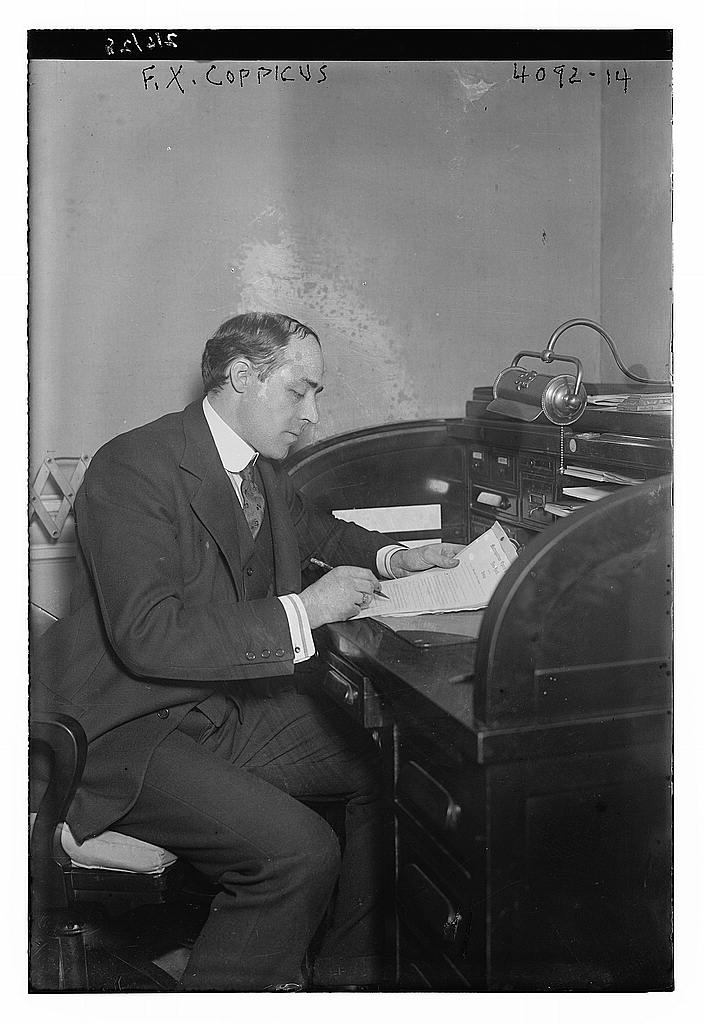
- Coppicus circa 1917
- Born: March 9, 1880; Neheim, Germany
- Died: June 9, 1966 (aged 86); Mill Valley, California
- Spouse: Maybelle Louise Hogan

Francis Charles Coppicus (March 9, 1880 – June 8, 1966) was the general secretary of the Metropolitan Opera. He was the manager for Enrico Caruso, Feodor Chaliapin, and Maria Jeritza.

== Biography ==
He was born on March 9, 1880, in Neheim, Germany.

On May 8, 1909, he married Maybelle Louise Hogan in Manhattan.

On March 16, 1915, he became a citizen of the United States.

In 1916 he founded the Metropolitan Music Bureau. In 1930 six small concert bureaus merged into Columbia Artists Management.

He died on June 8, 1966, in Mill Valley, California.
