= The Most Illustrious =

Honorific title

The Most Illustrious (Spanish: Ilustrísimo Señor (male) or Ilustrísima Señora (female), literally "Most Illustrious Lord/Sir" or "Madam/Lady") – abbreviated "Ilmo. Sr. D." (male); or "Ilma. Sra. D.ª" / "Ilma. Sra. Dña." (female) – is an honorific prefix that is traditionally applied to certain people in Spain and certain Spanish-speaking countries. It is a lower version of the prefix The Most Excellent (Excelentísimo/a Señor/a), and was traditionally applied to non-Grandee titled nobles in Spain, but is now used for a series of other offices.

== In the Kingdom of Spain ==
The following State and Government officials receive the style "The Most Illustrious":

=== Constitutional court and judiciary ===
- The President of the Economic Administrative Central Court
- The Lawyers of the Spanish Council of State

=== Central government ===
- The Finance Delegates

=== Local authorities ===
- The Headmasters of Secondary State Schools

=== Diplomacy ===
- The Embassy Counsellors
- The Ministers Plenipotentiary of 3rd class

=== Other institutions ===
- The Director of the Spanish Academy of Rome
- The Director of the Spanish Agency of Data Protection

=== Nobility ===
- Non-Grandee titleholders, their spouses and heirs
- Non-firstborn children of Grandees

== Other countries ==
Reference to a Duke in the UK's upper house of Parliament The House of Lords historically employed the prefix "the illustrious Duke" in the late 1800s. In the 21st century, it has been replaced by the generic prefix "the noble Duke" which is customarily used for all members of the House of Lords, irrespective of their rank.
In other countries, "The Most Illustrious" is rarely used, but rather "Illustrious Highness"

== See also ==
- The Most Excellent
