= List of classical guitarists =

This is a list of classical guitarists.

== Baroque (17th and 18th centuries) ==
Name	Born	Country
Antoine Carré		France
Francesco Corbetta	c.1615–1681	Italy
Francisco Guerau	1649–1717/22	Spain
Gaspar Sanz	1640–1710	Spain
Giovanni Battista Granata	1620/1–1687	Italy
Angelo Michele Bartolotti	??–c.1682	Italy
Ludovico Roncalli	1654–1713	Italy
Girolamo Montesardo	early 17th century	Italy
Robert de Visée	c.1658–1725	France
Santiago de Murcia	c.1682 or 1685–1732	Spain

== 19th century ==
Name	Born	Country
Antonio Abreu	c. 1750–c. 1820	Portugal
Adam Darr	1811–1866	Germany
Andrei Osipovich Sychra	1773(6?)–1850	Russia
Antoine de Lhoyer	1768–1852	France
Catharina Josepha Pratten	1821–1895	Germany, United Kingdom
Dionisio Aguado	1784–1849	Spain
Eduard Bayer	1822–1908	Germany
Ernest Shand	1868–1924	United Kingdom
Ferdinando Carulli	1770–1841	Italy
Fernando Sor	1778–1839	Spain
Francesco Molino	1775–1847	Italy
Francisco Tárrega	1852–1909	Spain
François de Fossa	1775–1849	Spain, France
Giulio Regondi	1823–1872	Switzerland, Italy, United Kingdom
Ivan Padovec	1800–1873	Croatia
Jacques Bosch	1825–1895	Spain, France
Jan Nepomucen Bobrowicz	1805–1881	Poland
Johann Kaspar Mertz	1806–1856	Slovakia, Austria
José Brocá	1805–1882	Spain
José Ferrer	1835–1916	Spain
Joseph Küffner	1776–1856	Germany
Julián Arcas	1832–1882	Spain
Luigi Legnani	1790–1877	Italy
Luis T. Romero	1854–1893	USA
Marco Aurelio Zani de Ferranti	1801–1878	Italy
Matteo Carcassi	1792–1853	Italy
Mauro Giuliani	1781–1829	Italy
Napoléon Coste	1805–1883	France
Niccolò Paganini	1782–1840	Italy
Pierre Jean Porro	1750–1831	France
Simon Molitor	1766–1848	Germany, Austria
Wenzel Thomas Matiegka	1773–1830	Czech Republic
Victor Magnien	1802–1884	France

== 20th century ==
Name	Born	Country
Abel Carlevaro	1916–2001	Uruguay
Agustín Barrios Mangoré	1885–1944	Paraguay
Alberto Ponce	1935–2019	Spain, France
Alexandre Lagoya	1929–1999	France
Alirio Díaz	1923–2016	Venezuela
Andrés Segovia	1893–1987	Spain
Antonio Lauro	1917–1986	Venezuela
Antonio Membrado	1935–2016	Spain
Carlos Paredes	1925–2004	Portugal
Cayo Sila Godoy	1919–2014	Paraguay
Celedonio Romero	1913–1996	Spain
Cesar Amaro	1948–2012	Uruguay
Clara Nicola	1926–2017	Cuba
Emilio Pujol	1886–1980	Spain
Erling Møldrup	1943–2016	Denmark
Frantz Casseus	1915–1993	Haiti
Gentil Montaña	1942–2011	Colombia
Heike Matthiesen	1969-2023	Germany
Heinrich Albert	1870–1950	Germany
Ida Presti	1924–1967	France
Italo Meschi	1887–1957	Italy
Jorge Morel	1931-2021	Argentina, USA
José Tomás	1934–2001	Spain
Juanjo Domínguez	1951–2019	Argentina
Julian Bream	1933–2020	United Kingdom
Konrad Ragossnig	1932–2018	Austria
Laurindo Almeida	1917–1995	Brasil
Leif Christensen	1950–1988	Denmark
Luise Walker	1910–1998	Austria
María Luisa Anido	1907–1996	Argentina, Spain
Miguel Ablóniz	1917–2001	Egypt, Greece, Italy
Miguel Llobet	1878–1938	Spain
Narciso Yepes	1927–1997	Spain
Oscar Ghiglia	1938-2024	Italy
Regino Sainz de la Maza	1896–1981	Spain
Roland Dyens	1955–2016	France
Renata Tarragó	1927–2005	Spain
Sergei Orekhov	1935–1998	Russia
Stanko Prek	1915–1999	Slovenia
Vahdah Olcott-Bickford	1885–1980	USA
William Foden	1860–1947	USA

== Contemporary ==
Name	Born	Country
Adam Holzman	1960	USA
Adnan Ahmedic	1975	Bosnia
Alejandro González	1973	Cuba
Alice Artzt	1943	USA
Álvaro Pierri	1953	Uruguay
An Tran	1992	Vietnam, USA
Ana Vidović	1980	Croatia
Anastasia Bardina	1962	Russia
Anders Miolin	1961	Sweden, Switzerland
Andrew York	1958	USA
Angel Romero	1946	Spain
Aniello Desiderio	1971	Italy
AnnaMaria Cardinalli	1979	USA
Annette Kruisbrink	1958	Netherlands
Antigoni Goni	1969	Greece
Artyom Dervoed	1981	Russia
Andrei Krylov	1959	Russia
Badi Assad	1966	Brazil
Benjamin Dwyer	1965	Ireland
Berta Rojas	1966	Paraguay
Carlo Domeniconi	1947	Italy
Carlo Marchione	1964	Italy
Carlos Bonell	1949	United Kingdom
Charles Ramirez	1953	United Kingdom
Chen Shanshan	1983	China
Christopher Parkening	1947	USA
Dang Ngoc Long	1957	Germany, Vietnam
David Leisner	1953	USA
Dave Flynn	1977	Ireland
David Russell	1953	United Kingdom
David Starobin	1951	USA
David Tanenbaum	1956	USA
Denis Azabagic	1972	Bosnia
Detlev Bork	1967	Germany
Dimitri Illarionov	1979	Russia
Dušan Bogdanović	1955	Serbia
Edoardo Catemario	1965	Italy
Eduardo Fernández	1952	Uruguay
Ekachai Jearakul	1987	Thailand
Elie Ossipovitch	1987	France
Eliot Fisk	1958	USA, Austria
Erkan Ogur	1954	Turkey
Evan Hirschelman	1976	USA
Evangelos Assimakopoulos	1940	Greece
Filomena Moretti	1973	Italy
Flavio Sala	1983	Italy
Frank Bungarten	1958	Germany
Gabriel Bianco	1988	France
Gabriel Estarellas	1952	Spain
Gareth Koch	1962	Australia
Georg Gulyás	1968	Sweden
Gilbert Biberian	1944	Turkey, United Kingdom
Goran Krivokapić	1979	Serbia
Göran Söllscher	1955	Sweden
Hubert Käppel	1951	Germany
Hucky Eichelmann	1956	Germany, Thailand
Irina Kulikova	1982	Russia
Jaime Mirtenbaum Zenamon	1953	Bolivia
Jason Vieaux	1973	USA
Jim Ferguson	1948	USA
Johanna Beisteiner	1976	Austria
John Couch	1976	New Zealand, Australia
John Feeley	1955	Ireland
John Schneider	1950	USA
John Williams	1941	Australia, United Kingdom
Jorge Cardoso	1949	Argentina
József Eötvös	1962	Hungary
Józef Zsapka	1947	Slovakia
Julian Bream	1933 - 2020	England
Jürgen Rost	1945	Germany
Kaori Muraji	1978	Japan
Karin Schaupp	1972	Germany, Australia
Peter and Zoltán Katona	1968	Hungary
Kazuhito Yamashita	1961	Japan
Kyuhee Park	1985	South Korea
Laura Snowden	1989	United Kingdom, France
Laura Young	1962	Canada
Leo Brouwer	1939	Cuba
Leon Koudelak	1961	Czech Republic, Switzerland, Thailand
Li Jie	1981	China
Liat Cohen	1971	France, Israel
Liona Boyd	1949	Canada
Liza Zoe	1940	Greece
Magnus Andersson	1955	Sweden
Mak Grgic	1987	Slovenia
Manuel Barrueco	1952	Cuba
Marc Ongley	1952	USA
Marc Regnier	1963	USA
Marcin Dylla	1976	Poland
Marco Pereira	1950	Brazil
Margarita Escarpa	1964	Spain
María Isabel Siewers	1950	Argentina
Maria Kämmerling	1946	Germany
Marko Topchii	1991	Ukraine
Mårten Falk	1973	Sweden
Martha Masters	1972	USA
Mattias Schulstad	1984	Sweden
Máximo Diego Pujol	1957	Argentina
Michael Laucke	1947	Canada
Michael Nicolella	1963	USA
Michael Tröster	1956	Germany
Milan Zelenka	1939	Czech Republic
Milica Ilic	1981	Australia
Milos Karadaglic	1983	Montenegro
Monika Rost	1943	Germany
Nicola Hall	1969	United Kingdom
Nikita Koshkin	1956	Russia
Norbert Kraft	1950	Austria, Canada
Ólavur Jakobsen	1964	Faroe Islands
Oliver Fartach-Naini	1964	Germany
Pablo Márquez	1967	Argentina
Patrick Kearney	1970	Canada
Paul Galbraith	1964	United Kingdom
Pavel Steidl	1961	Czech Republic, Netherlands
Pepe Romero	1944	Spain
Petar Čulić	1986	Croatia
Petrit Ceku	1985	Kosovo
Piotr Pakhomkin	1985	Russia, USA
Rafael Andia	1942	France
Rafael Serrallet	1971	Spain
Reinbert Evers	1949	Germany
Ricardo Gallén	1972	Spain
Robert Phillips	1953	USA
Roberto Fabbri	1964	Italy
Scott Tennant	1962	USA
Sean Shibe	1992	United Kingdom
Sergio Assad	1952	Brazil
Sharon Isbin	1956	USA
Simone Iannarelli	1970	Italy
Slava Grigoryan	1976	Australia
Stanley Yates	1958	United Kingdom, USA
Stefano Grondona	1958	Italy
Štěpán Rak	1945	Czech Republic
Stephen Marchionda	1967	USA, Spain
Su Meng	1988	China
Thomas Müller-Pering	1958	Germany
Tilman Hoppstock	1961	Germany
Timo Korhonen	1964	Finland
Tony Harmon	1958	USA
Vladimir Gorbach	1981	Russia
Ferenc Bernáth	1981	Hungary, Ukraine
Andras Csaki	1981	Hungary
Wang Yameng	1981	China
William Kanengiser	1959	USA
Yang Xuefei	1977	China
Yorgos Foudoulis	1964	Greece
Zoran Dukic	1969	Croatia
Miloš Karadaglić	1983	Montenegro

== See also ==
- List of flamenco guitarists
