= Luis Romero =

Luis Romero may refer to:

== Arts and entertainment ==
- Luis T. Romero (1854–1893), American classical guitarist
- Luis Romero (novelist) (1916–2009), Spanish novelist
- Luis Enrique Romero (actor), actor in Dueña y señora

== Sportspeople ==
- Luis Romero Petit (1917–2017), Venezuelan baseball player
- Luis Romero (Uruguayan footballer) (born 1968), former Uruguayan football striker
- Luis Romero (footballer, born 1984), Ecuadorian football defender
- Luis Romero (footballer, born 1990), Argentine football defender
- Luis Romero (Venezuelan footballer) (born 1990)
- Luis Romero (footballer, born 1991), Mexican footballer
- Luis Alberto (footballer, born 1992), Spanish football forward

== Other ==
- Luis Alberto Romero (historian), Argentine scholar and 2005 Guggenheim Fellow
