= Heinrich Albert =

Heinrich Albert may relate to:

- Heinrich Albert (composer) (1604–1651), German composer
- Heinrich Albert (guitarist) (1870–1950), German guitarist and composer
- Heinrich Albert (politician) (1874–1960), German politician, businessman and lawyer

== See also ==
- Heinrich Albertz (1915–1993), German theologian and politician
