= Tony Harmon =

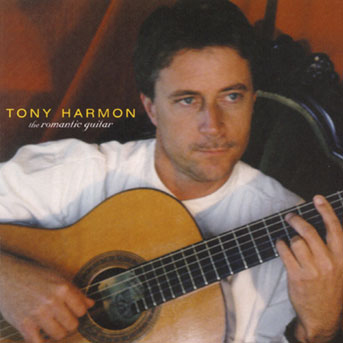

Background information
- Genres: Classical guitar
- Instrument: Acoustic guitar
- Website: www.tonyharmon.com

Tony Harmon is a classical guitarist who has performed on numerous television shows and special events. He composed and performed the musical soundtrack for ABC's The William Randolph Hearst Story, and performed at the Western White House for Ronald Reagan.

== Early life and education ==
Tony Harmon was born in Riverside, California to Sheila and Jim Harmon. He was introduced to the guitar at an early age by his father and began studying the instrument at the age of eleven at the local YMCA.

At 14 years old, Harmon gave his first public performance for an audience of more than 2,500 at Loma Linda University.

Harmon studied guitar with Patrick Read, Miguel Rubio, Philip Rosheger, George Sakellariou, Ray Reussner, Frederick Noad and Christopher Parkening.

== Career ==
At 18 years old, Harmon traveled to England to further his studies of the guitar. Following his return to the United States, Harmon composed the soundtrack to ABC's The William Randolph Hearst Story.

Earlier that year, Harmon was awarded the Outstanding Instrumentalist award by the Northern California Arts Association.

Harmon would later perform for President Ronald Reagan and his wife Nancy.

Harmon performed at the 2007 La Guitarra California Festival along with Pepe Romero and Roland Dyens and other guitarists. He also opened for The Romeros at the 2015 La Guitarra California Festival.

== Philanthropy ==
Harmon has performed in benefit concerts for organizations such as the Pacific Conservatory of the Performing Arts, La Purísima Mission and the Equine Alliance Youth Foundation, and the Lompoc Valley Family YMCA. Harmon is also the founder of GetSoundTrax, an online source for uploading, licensing, playlists and downloading all genres of music.

== Personal life ==
Harmon resides in Pine Mountain Club on the Central Coast of California. He was also an avid golfer and was on the team that played the Southern California Desert Conference in 1974.

Harmon also holds a 5th rank in martial art Jeet Kune Do and is an expert in Eskrima, the national sport and martial art of the Philippines.

== Discography ==
Year	Title	Type	Publisher/Record Company
2003	The Romantic Guitar	CD	Tony Harmon
2004	Cancion del Sueno	CD	Tony Harmon & Ray Pannell
2008	Live...from the California Historic Mission La Purisima	CD	Guitarist Tony Harmon
