= Frank Bungarten =

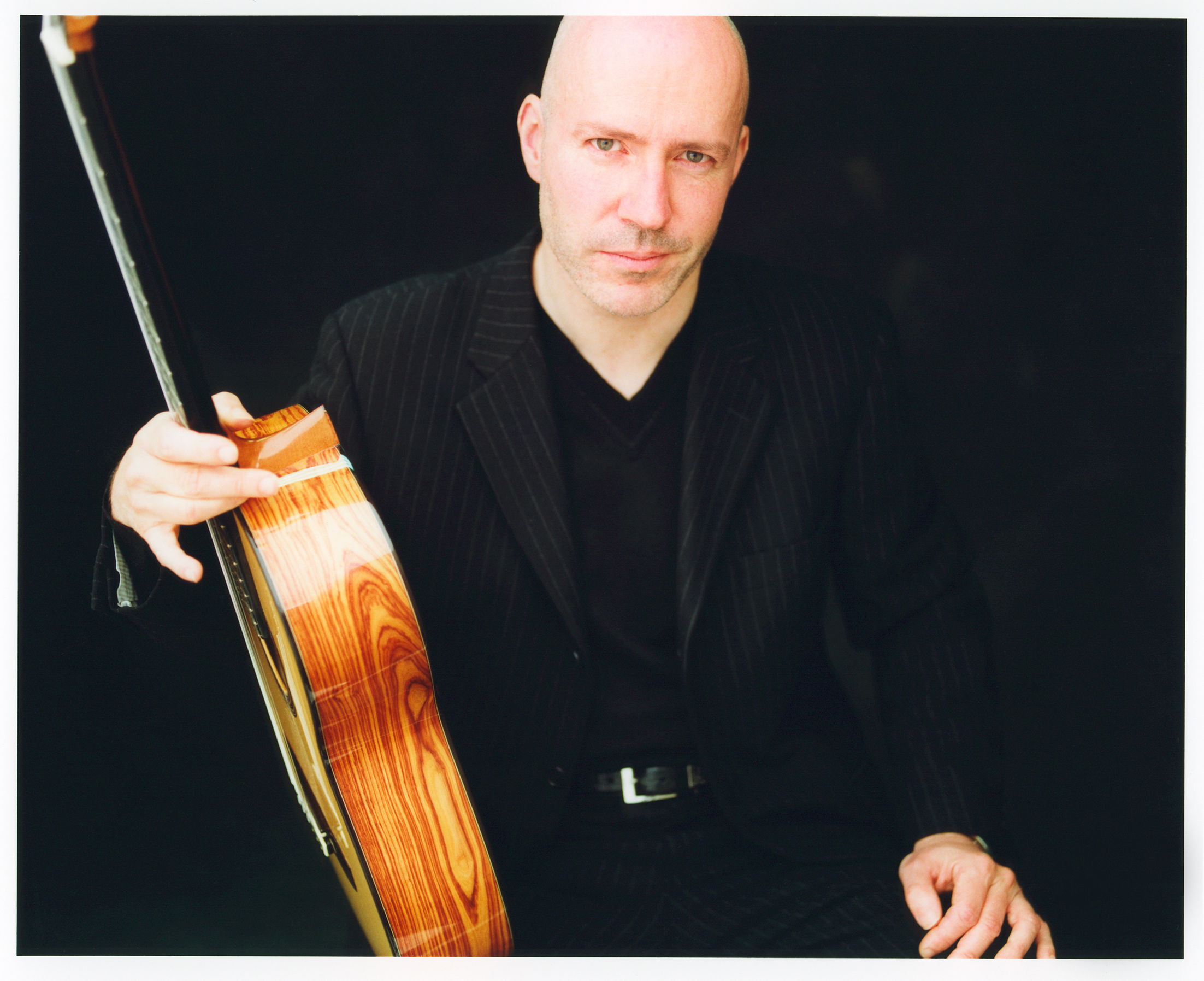

Background information
- Born: 6 May 1958 (age 68); Cologne, Germany
- Origin: Germany
- Genres: Classical Music, European art music
- Occupations: Classical Guitar Performer, Professor, Classical Musician.
- Instruments: Classical guitar, Saxophone
- Years active: 1980–present
- Website: http://www.frankbungarten.de/

Frank Bungarten (born 6 May 1958) is a classical guitarist from Germany. Although he is often regarded as a Bach expert on the guitar, Bungarten plays a wide and diverse repertoire.

== Biography ==
Born in Cologne, Bungarten first came in touch with the guitar aged ten. His first teacher was Paraguayan virtuoso Carlos Baez, then a temporary resident in the Rhineland. As a teenager he played in a school band. He had an early passion for jazz and taught himself tenor and soprano saxophone. Despite his later career as a classical musician, he has always regarded John Coltrane as one of his towering influences. Later he has played the saxophone with his group "Extempore", including engagements in radio productions, festivals and jazz clubs. Bungarten studied the guitar at the Academy of Music, Cologne, where he studied with Karl-Heinz Bottner and Hubert Käppel. He also attended a master class with Oscar Ghiglia in Italy.

In 1981, Andrés Segovia honoured him with the first prize at the Guitar Competition of Granada, leading to an extensive concert tour of Spain. Immediately following his studies, he commenced his career as a university lecturer and has been performing as a soloist throughout Europe and the Americas. To date, he has performed in over 40 countries including the Berlin Philharmonic, the Arts and Convention Centre Lucerne, the Gasteig (Munich), the Salzburg Festival, Schwetzingen Festival, the Schleswig-Holstein Music Festival, MDR Music Summer, the Lower Saxony Music Festival and at international guitar festivals in southern Europe, Scandinavia, India and elsewhere. He has won two Echo awards for his outstanding versatility on the classical guitar.

Among his recordings, "J. S.Bach. Sonatas and Partitas for Violin solo", has received particular critical acclaim.

== Teaching ==
Bungarten used to earn his pocket money as a teenager by giving guitar lessons, and he had later taught both kids and adults for seven years and at the municipal music school in Frechen. In 1981, he served as assistant to his teacher Hubert Käppel at the Cologne Academy of Music. Since 1982, Bungarten holds a chair at the Hochschule für Musik, Theater und Medien Hannover in Hannover. From 1989 to 2010, he was also a professor at the University of Lucerne, Switzerland, which he resigned in favour of his artistic activities. He regularly conducts masterclasses and seminars all over the world. His uncompromising approach to teaching, projects the classical guitar's versatile potential.

== Awards and recognition ==
In 2005, Frank Bungarten was awarded the Echo Klassik award for "Instrumentalist of the Year" for his CD Cancion y Danza.

He has been also rewarded with the "Preis der Deutschen Schallplattenkritik" (German music critic awards), the "Audio Reference" (Audio Reference prize).

In 2011, Frank Bungarten was honoured with the "Echo Klassik" (Echo (music award)) award as "Instrumentalist of the Year" a second time.

On 14 October 2018, Bungarten was awarded the "Opus Klassik" prize during a gala hosted by Thomas Gottschalck at the Konzerthaus in Berlin.

For almost two decades, he has made reference recordings with concept repertoires on the audiophile label Musikproduktion Dabringhaus & Grimm (MDG), including a comprehensive interpretation of Bach's solo violin works in his own transcriptions. The French audio magazine Diapason simply wrote, "What we hear is not guitar, not Bungarten, it is Bach".

== Discography ==
- J. S. Bach: Sonatas and Partitas for Violin Solo, Transcriptions for Guitar (MDG 305–1028–2)
- Fernando Sor: Selected Studies (MDG L3390)
- Castelnuovo-Tedesco: 24 Caprichos de Goya, Op. 195 (MDG 305–0725–2)
- Heitor Villa-Lobos: Complete Solo Works for Guitar (MDG)
- Mauro Giuliani: Works for Flute and Guitar (with Andrea Lieberknecht, flute) (MDG)
- Federico Moreno Torroba: Guitar Works (MDG 905–1915–6, 2015)
- Johann Kaspar Mertz: The Last Viennese Virtuoso (MDG)
- Emilio Pujol: Estudios (MDG 905–2131–6)
- Cancion y Danza (MDG 305–1246–2)
