= International Guitar Competition & Festival Berlin =

The International Guitar Competition & Festival, Berlin, is a competition for classical guitarists from all over the world. The art director is the composer and guitarist Dang Ngoc Long.

Participants from all over the world, without age limit, may register for the competition. Selected candidates must go through the competition rounds, performing required pieces specified by the organizers as well as freely chosen works from different musical periods.

The competition has occurred every two years since 2006, always in the capital of Germany. To date, there have been participants from many countries, including Austria, Belgium, Chile, China, Colombia, Denmark, Ireland, Italy, New Zealand, Peru, Poland, Russia, Spain, the United Kingdom, Vietnam, Belarus, Ukraine, Brazil, South Korea, France...

== Winners ==
- 2006
  - 1. Prize: Shiri Coneh (Israel)
  - 2. Prize: Noriyuki Masuda (Japan)
  - 3. Prize: Karoline Kumst (Germany)
  - 3. Prize: Gaku Yamada (Japan)
- 2008
  - 1. Prize: Ekachai Jearakul (Thailand)
  - 2. Prize: Mateus Dela Ponte (Brazil)
  - 3. Prize: Nohyoung Lee (South Korea)
- 2010
  - 1. Prize: Chia-wei lin (Taiwan)
  - 2. Prize: Bilodid Denys (Ukraine)
  - 3. Prize: Claire Sananikone (France)
- 2012:
  - 1. Prize: Claire Sananikone (France)
  - 2. Prize: Igor Dedusenko (Belarus)
  - 3. Prize: Nejc Kuhar (Slovenia)
  - Special Prize: Svetoslav Kostov (Bulgaria) (Best presentation of compositions from Dang Ngoc Long)
- 2014:
  - 1. Prize: Jakob Bangsø (Denmark)
  - 2. Prize: Yaroslav Makarich (Belarus)
  - 3. Prize: Dimitry Zagumennikov (Russia)
- 2016:
  - 1. Prize: Niklas Johansen (Denmark)
  - 2. Prize: An Tran (Vietnam)
  - 3. Prize: Francesco Scelzo (Peru)
  - Special Prize: Yaroslav Makarich (Belarus) (Best presentation of compositions from Dang Ngoc Long)
- 2020:
  - 1. Prize: Yaroslav Makarich (Belarus)
  - 2. Prize: Chinnawat Themkumkwun (Thailand)
  - 3. Prize: Luca Romanelli (Italy)
  - Special Prize: Nhu Khanh Dao (Vietnam) (Best presentation of compositions from Dang Ngoc Long)
- 2024:
  - 1. Prize: Luca Romanelli (Italy)
  - 2. Prize: (Spain) Samuel Beluzán Rodríguez (Belarus)
  - 3. Prize: Raul Rolon (Paraguay)

== Jury ==
The jury members consist of renowned professors and artists from around the world, as well as first-prize winners from previous years.
