= Trio de Cologne =

Trio de Cologne are a classical guitar trio: either with Zoran Dukić (Croatia), Laura Young (Canada) and Pablo Márquez (Argentina), or with Zoran Dukić, Laura Young and Ceca Madzarevic.

The Trio de Cologne has performed as part of the World Guitar Ensemble.

== Recordings ==
- La Belle Excentrique. Bizet, Faure, Debussy, Satie (AS 2006 2, Al Segno, marketed by artelier media)
  mp3: Erik Satie - Grande Ritournelle
  with Dukić, Young and Madzarevic
- Juegos del Viento. Stravinsky, Bogdanovic, Bartok, Hindemith, Domeniconi, Satie. (GHA 126.041, GHA Records)
  with Dukić, Young and Márquez
