= John Couch =

John Couch is the name of:

- John H. Couch (1811–1870), American sea captain and pioneer
- John Couch (American football), former college football coach for Fordham University
- John Couch (classical guitarist) (born 1976), New Zealand classical guitarist
- John Couch Adams (1819–1892), English astronomer
- John Couch (American executive), executive most closely associated with Apple Computer
- John Nathaniel Couch (1896–1986), American mycologist

== See also ==
- John H. Couch (side-wheeler), steamboat
