= Christin Neddens =

German jazz and fusion drummer

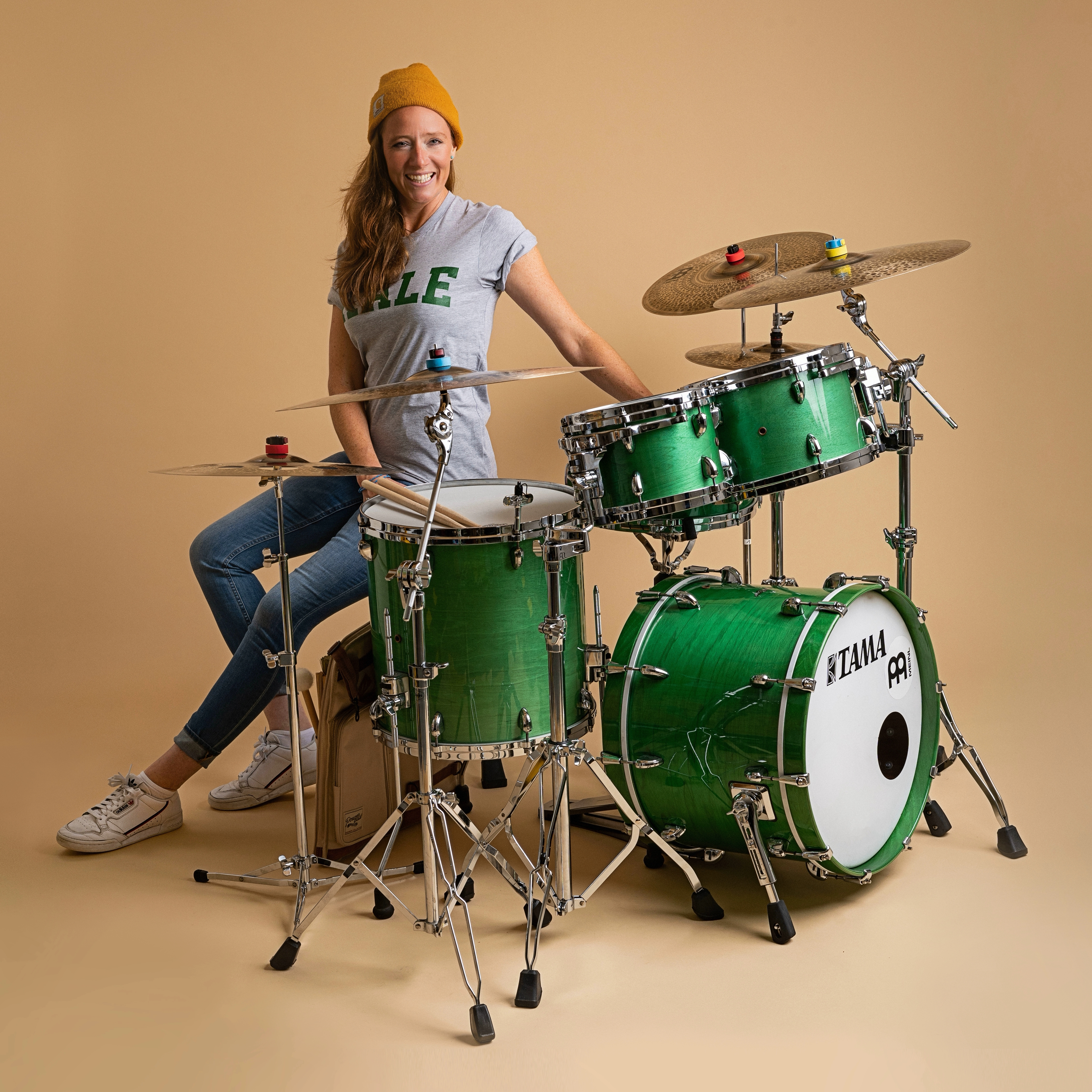
Christin Neddens

Christin Neddens (born October 13, 1986) is a German jazz and fusion drummer. Based in Hamburg, the musician works as a live drummer, studio drummer and composer.

== Education ==
Neddens comes from a musical family and began playing the accordion in early childhood before switching to drums and piano at the age of seven. After graduating from high school, she studied with Heinz Lichius at the Hanover University of Music, Drama and Media, with Ralph Peterson Jr. and Steve Altenberg at the Prins Claus Conservatorium in Groningen (Netherlands), at the University Of Southern California in Los Angeles (USA) with Peter Erskine (further with Jeff Hamilton) and later with Holger Nell at the Hamburg University of Music and Theatre, where she still lives today. In 2016 she took part in the pop course and played in various large ensembles under the direction of Jiggs Whigham.

== Career ==
Neddens has performed at international festivals in Scandinavia, the Middle East, Southern Europe, India, Africa, China and the USA as well as in Germany such as JazzBaltica, Elbjazz and the Leverkusener Jazztage. Her drumming is rooted in American jazz, and big band drumming and features a mixture of R'n'B, pop, soul and modern fusion elements.

Her style was initially heavily influenced by Weather Report, John Scofield and Jaco Pastorius' World Of Mouth Big Band, and later by the Yellowjackets, albums by the Bob Mintzer Big Band, film music by Lalo Schifrin and Ennio Morricone, and compositions by Maria Schneider and Pat Metheny. Christin's strongest drum-specific influences come from Keith Carlock, Peter Erskine, Will Kennedy, Wolfgang Haffner, Jeff Hamilton and Rex Hardy Jr.

Neddens is on the road in several cross-genre projects, playing with jazz musicians such as Nils Landgren and Helge Schneider or pop artists such as Rea Garvey, Calum Scott and Silbermond. She has made guest appearances with the NDR Bigband and has taken part in various ARD and ZDF productions such as the Carolin Kebekus Show. She composed the score for Heikko Deutschmann's short film; ‘’Noch ein Seufzer und es wird Nacht (One last sigh before Nightfall)’’, which aired on ARD and Arte in 2017, received a nomination for Best Film Score at the fourth Delhi Shorts International Film Festival, and appears as a composer with her own instrumental fusion formations.

Furthermore, Neddens is also active as a lecturer. She teaches at the Hochschule für Musik, Theater und Medien Hannover and the Osnabrück Institute of Music, and has held guest lectureships at the Marin School Of The Arts, San Francisco Area (USA), the Prins Claus Conservatorium (Netherlands) and the Hochschule für Musik und Theater Hamburg. Her Instagram account has 169,000 followers (as of 15 July 2025).

== Discography ==
=== LPs ===
- „Grenzbereiche“, Grenzbereiche, 2011, Schoener Hören Music
- „Ten Wishes“, Bajazzo, 2019, Raumer Records

=== Scores ===
- Score to Heikko Deutschmann's short „Noch ein Seufzer und es wird Nacht“

=== Singles ===
- „Buttermilk“, Christin Neddens Orange Line, 2019
- „Echo Park“, Christin Neddens Orange Line, 2019

== Radio ==
- 2022: Jazz – Round Midnight, Lady Liberty #22: Die Schlagzeugerin Christin Neddens, NDR Kultur
- 2020: Christin Neddens' Orange Line live at Hamburg Jazz Open 2020, NDR Info

== Books ==
- Christin Neddens' Creative Flow (englisch) – The ultimate Drum Practice Workout, Alfred Publishing, Cologne, 2025, ISBN 978-3-947998-18-0
