= Francien van Tuinen =

Dutch jazz-singer

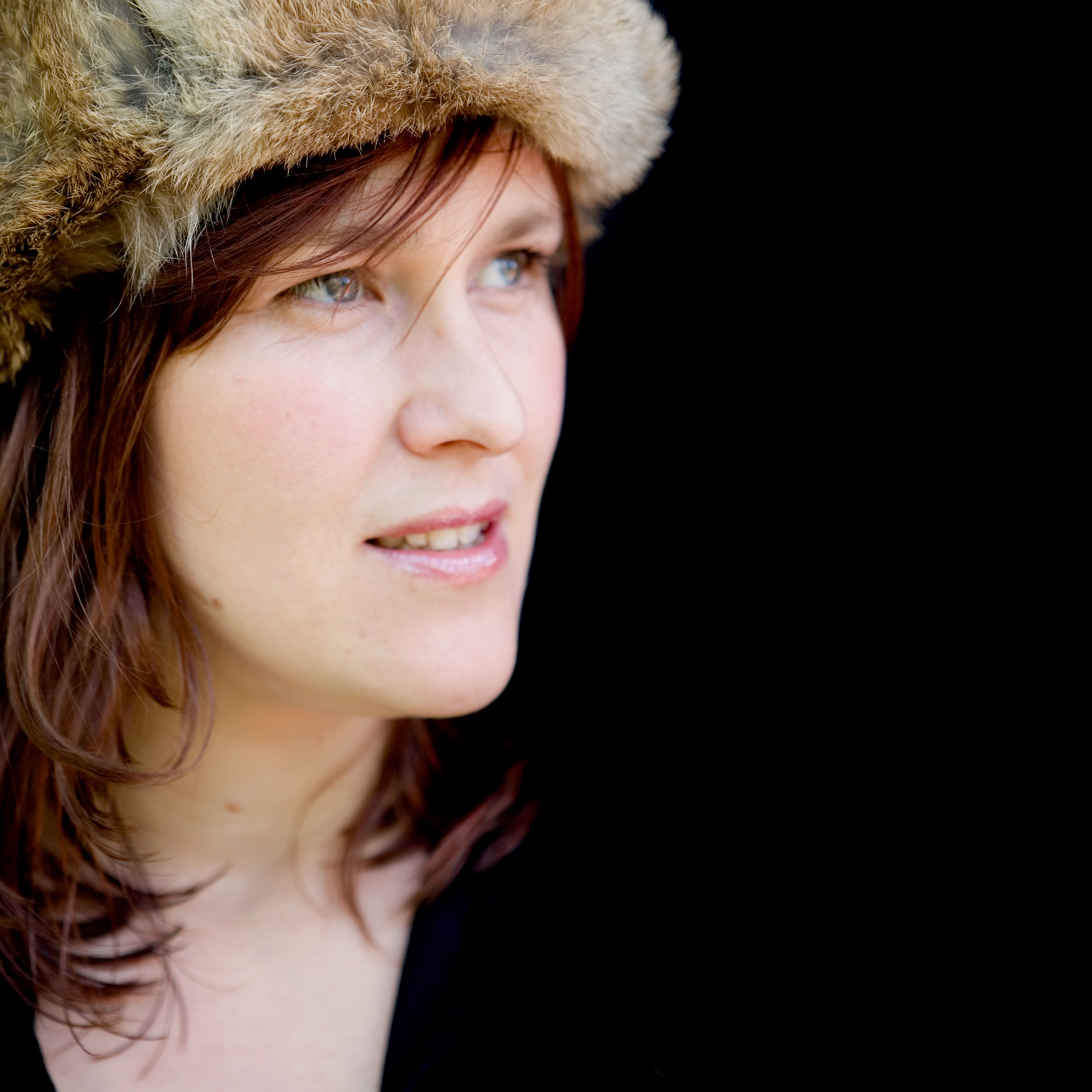
- Born: 29 March 1971 (age 55)
- Occupation: Jazz singer
- Years active: 1997–present

Francien van Tuinen (born 29 March 1971) is a Dutch jazz singer. In 1998, she graduated from the Prince Claus Conservatoire in Groningen.

== Discography ==
- 1998: Tuindance (VIA Records)
- 2002: Despina's Eye (Culture Records Benelux)
- 2003: A Perfect Blue Day
- 2005: Muzyka (BMCD)
- 2009: Daytrippers (Red Sauce Records)
