= Colette Mourey =

French musician and musicologist

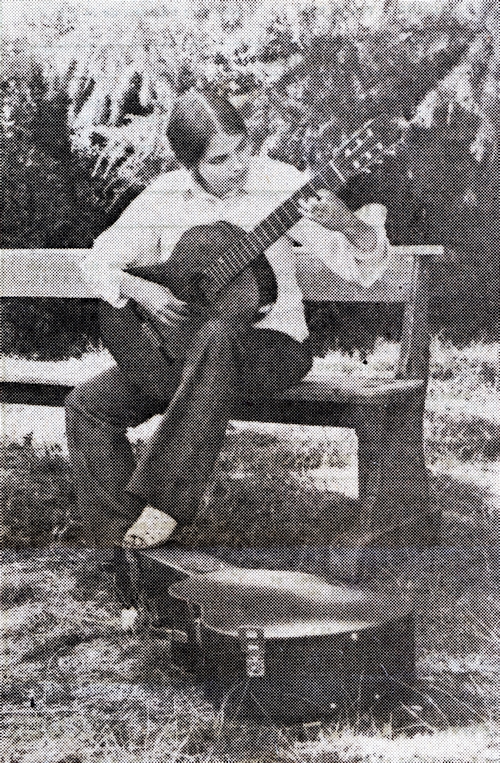
Colette Mourey, 1970

Colette Mourey (born 1954) is a French classical guitarist, music educator, musicologist and composer.

== Biography ==
Born in Kenitra (Morocco), Mourey studied musicology at the Sorbonne under Edith Weber and passed the agrégation. First a classical guitarist and student of Uruguayan guitarist Oscar Cacères, she is also a pianist.

As a teacher, she teaches writing, aesthetics and music didactics at the Université de Franche-Comté and the École supérieure du professorat et de l'éducation. She is also involved with the "Passeurs d'Art" association for the creation of free children's orchestras.

For her research, she starts from works on the atonal music of her teacher Julien Falk to develop a new musical system called "hypertonality". This is based on spiral scales (in amplitudes higher than the octave), radically transforming atonal counterpoint techniques. This allows the reintroduction of "natural consonances" within a contemporary language, which contributes to bringing contemporary music closer to the "general public".

She is the author of numerous books on musicology and teaching.

As a composer, she is the author of more than 1000 works (published at the éditions Bergmann, Reift Marcophon, Soldano, Delatour, and Profs editions. In 2012, she won the First Prize of the International Competition for Instrumentalists and Composers "Music and Earth" in Sofia (Bulgaria). From 2012 to 2014, she has been awarded by the IBLA Foundation for her works Estudios Festivos; Homenaje a Manuel Ponce (guitar) in 2012, Variations In Memoriam (guitar) in 2013, and Bucoliques (harpsichord) in 2014

== Publications ==
Research books

- 2011: Éléments de composition hypertonale (Éditions Marc Reift)
- 2016: Synergies - de l'espace musical à l'espace urbain (Éditions L’Harmattan)
- 2016: Essai sur le son mental : de résonner… à raisonner (Éditions L’Harmattan)
- 2016: Résonance (Éditions Edilivre)
- 2016: L'intelligence musicale (Éditions Marc Reift)
- 2017: Petit Précis d'Agriculture Symbiotique

Teaching books

- 2012: Du contrepoint au contrepoint atonal (Éditions Marc Reift)
- 2013: Comment écouter une œuvre musicale (Éditions Marc Reift)
- 2014: Introduction au contrepoint (Éditions Marc Reift)
- 2014: Vous avez dit baroque (Éditions Marc Reift)
- 2014: Vers une approche de l'objet musical et de sa médiation (Éditions Marc Reift)
- 2014: Introduction à l'harmonie et à l'orchestration tonales (Éditions Marc Reift)
- 2015: Vers une approche des écrits musicaux (Éditions Marc Reift)
- 2015: Vous avez dit classique (Éditions Marc Reift)
- 2017: Approche chromatique de l'enseignement pianistique (Éditions Delatour)

Novels

- 2016: Himaya (Éditions Mémogrames)
- 2016: Dieu est à la caisse (Éditions du Menhir)
- 2017: Hélène (Éditions Collections de Mémoire)
- 2017: Les terres promises (Editions Balland)
- 2017: L'Ombre des Âmes (PGCOM Editions)
- 2017: Les Terres Nourricières (PGCOM Editions)
- 2017: Et la lumière fut ! (PGCOM Editions)
- 2018: "Entrechats" (Éditions Maia)

Scores series (partial list)

- 2013: 12 partitas hypertonales (Éditions Marc Reift)
- 2014: Sad o'clock soul dance (Éditions Marc Reift)
- 2015: 2 ariettes (Profs Editions)
- 2015: World concerto (Éditions Marc Reift)
- 2015: Chanson de la rose des voix (Éditions Marc Reift)
- 2016: Piano-merveilles (Éditions Delatour)
- 2016: Avant l'aube (Éditions Bergmann)
- 2016: Little Tom thumb rag (Éditions Soldano)
- 2016: Mon piano part en vacances (Éditions Delatour)
- 2016: Piano Blues (Éditions Delatour)
- 2016: Au chant des saisons (Éditions Delatour)
- 2016: Mouvances, pour Tuba solo (Éditions Chanteloup)
- 2018: Cantate "Les Droits de l'Homme" (Éditions La Fabrik'à Notes)
- 2018: 12 Petits Préludes Hypertonaux (Éditions Marc Reift)
- 2018: Quasi Sonata (Éditions Soldano)
- 2018: 4 Estudios Festivos (Éditions Marc Reift)
- 2018: Bagatelle (Éditions Bergmann)
- 2018: Quetzalcoatl Concerto (Éditions Marc Reift)

== Works performed ==
The list below is not exhaustive

- Invitation for bass clarinet and guitar played by Sauro Berti, bass clarinet of the Teatro dell'Opera di Roma and Leonardo De Marchi.
- Abacus for solo guitar played by Patrick Ruby.
- Fumée (based on poem by Théophile Gautier) for soprano and guitar, performed by Alice Fagard and Clothilde Bernard.
- Chanson de la rose des voix and Les quatre chansons spiraliques (based on texts by Michel Butor).
- Un conte de Noël for 4-handed harpsichord
- Variations in Memoriam for guitar composed for Marcelo de la Puebla.
- Sonata Appassionata for guitar in homage to Petar Čulić.
- Eaux-fortes for piano composed for Konstantin Lifschitz.
- Mers et Monts, Jean Sébastien Bach by François Henry, Alice Fagard, Hélène Ruggeri, Clotilde Bernard.
