= Ann Gale =

American painter

- Born: 1966 (age 59–60)
- Education: Rhode Island College, BFA; Yale University, MFA
- Occupation: figurative painter
- Spouse: Michael Nicolella

Ann Gale (born 1966) is an American figurative painter based in Seattle, Washington. She is known for her portrait paintings, which consist of an accumulation of small color patches expressing the changing light and the shifting position of her models over time. Some of her main influences are Lucian Freud, Alberto Giacometti, and Antonio López García.

Gale works from live models and her process is lengthy. Once she begins to paint, she works for three-hour sessions, and takes from four months to two years to complete a painting. Her pieces possess a strong psychological component due to the amount of time she spends with her models. Gale's portraits are not always entirely accurate to the subject they are based upon, rather, according to Gale herself, are based upon Gale's current perception of the subject. The picture she paints may change midway through the painting process if Gale notices a change in the subject's posing.

Ann Gale, Rachel, 2007, oil on canvas

Gale received her BFA from the Rhode Island College in 1988 and her MFA from Yale University in 1991. She has been the recipient of several awards including: Western States Art Federation/National Endowment for the Arts Fellowship (1996), Elizabeth Greenshields Foundation Grant (1997), Trust Grant/GAP Award (2003) and a John Simon Guggenheim Fellowship (2007). The artist's work has been shown in galleries and museums across the United States including solo exhibitions at the Portland Art Museum, Portland, Oregon (2007) and the Weatherspoon Art Museum at The University of North Carolina at Greensboro (2008). Gale is a professor of painting at the University of Washington School of Art. She is married to the classical guitarist and composer Michael Nicolella.
