= Patrick Kearney (guitarist) =

Canadian classical guitarist

Patrick James Kearney (born 1970) is a Canadian classical guitarist. He is known for his virtuosic and Romantic interpretations of both contemporary and canonical guitar music. He studied at the École Normale de Musique de Paris under Rafael Andia and Alberto Ponce.

He is director of the Montreal International Classical Guitar Festival and Competition.

He currently teaches classical guitar performance at Concordia University and at Vanier College in Montreal, in the Canadian province of Quebec.

== Discography ==
- Bouquet (1997), La Flame LF9701CD
- Stringendo (2001), Daminus Records D991
- Diabolico (2004), La Flame LF0401
- Impressions (2009), ATMA Classique Records ACD22629
