= Sabrina Vlaškalić =

Serbian guitarist (1989–2019)

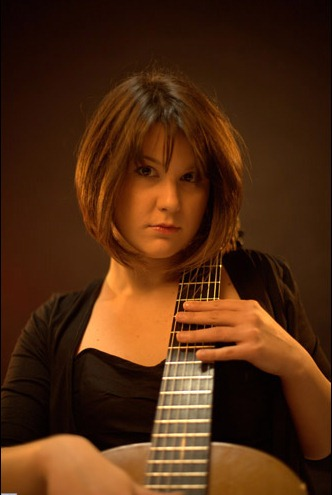

Background information
- Born: 18 January 1989; Belgrade, Serbia
- Died: 17 January 2019 (aged 29) Groningen, Netherlands
- Occupations: Guitarist; music teacher
- Instrument: Classical guitar

Sabrina Vlaškalić (Serbian: Сабрина Влашкалић; 18 January 1989 – 17 January 2019) was a Serbian classical guitarist. Unusually gifted, she saw music and numbers as colours and she was compared to the French child prodigy Ida Presti. By 23 she was teaching music at a conservatory and a university.

== Life ==
Vlaškalić was born in Belgrade in 1989. She started playing guitar when she was seven but she also showed a talent for maths and physics which she credited to her synesthesia. She associated colours with numbers. She competed in maths and physics competitions. Vlaskalic perceived music-color associations. To her, C major was red; F major was brown.

She went on to study with Aleksandar Hadži-Đorđević at the music high school Vatroslav Lisinski. She studied further with Professor Srdjan Tosic at the Faculty of Music Art in Belgrade. She left Serbia to study with Zoran Dukic in the Netherlands at the Royal Conservatory of Music in The Hague. Dukic did not teach her guitar skills but to listen. He would have her listen and then imitate the performances of Julian Bream or Ida Presti. She gained her master's degree in 2012. She won many awards and was compared to Presti.

Vlaškalić went on to teach in Groningen at the Prince Claus Conservatoire at the Hanze University of Applied Sciences. At 23 she was unusually young to hold such a position. She would colour in her music scores for her students in different colours using her own synesthesia as a guide. She said that she believed that many could spot the associations of colour if they could see the "language within a language".

Vlaškalić died in a traffic accident in Groningen in January 2019. She was hit by a lorry whilst cycling on the day before her 30th birthday.
