= Georg Gulyás =

- Born: 5 October 1968 (age 56)
- Origin: Säffle, Sweden
- Instrument: Guitar

Georg Gulyás (born 5 October 1968) is a Swedish classical guitarist.

== Biography ==
Georg Gulyás was born in Säffle, Sweden, and studied at the Musikhögskolan in Malmö and Juilliard School of Music in New York. He has received a guitar diploma from École Normale de Musique in Paris 1997 and Kungliga Musikhögskolan in Stockholm. Among his notable teachers are Göran Söllscher, Alberto Ponce and Sharon Isbin. In 1987, Gulyás received first prize in the "Karis International Guitar Competition". Since then he has been touring in Russia, Japan, USA and South America as well as performing as soloist with several major orchestras such as Royal Stockholm Philharmonic Orchestra.

Gulyás has recorded several CDs featuring music by Alberto Ginastera, Manuel de Falla and Gerardo Matos Rodríguez. The CD "Albèniz, Ponce, Tárrega" was awarded "Best Instrumental Music" at the 2006 Audiophile Recordings Awards in Hong Kong.

In 2011, a CD with guitar music by J.S. Bach was released.

== Repertoire (selection) ==
- Recuerdos de la Alhambra – Francisco Tárrega
- Capricho arabe – Francisco Tárrega
- Asturias – Isaac Albéniz
- Gyermekeknek – Béla Bartók
- Preludium I-V – Heitor Villa-Lobos
- Nocturnal Op. 70 – Benjamin Britten
- Sonata – Leo Brouwer
- El Decamaron Negro – Leo Brouwer
- Études Simples – Leo Brouwer

=== Pieces written specifically for Gulyas ===
- GO – Stefan Pöntinen
- Three Japanese Songs – Moto Osada
- On Tour – Ylva Skog
- Lullabyesque – Gustav Alexandrie
- Herd's Lullaby – Miklós Maros
- Inas vaggvisa – Mauro Godoy Villalobos
- Fancy – Zoltan Gaal
- Preludium No. 12 – Johan Hammerth
- Kupé (for guitar duo) – Simon Stålspets
