= Michael Nicolella =

American classical composer

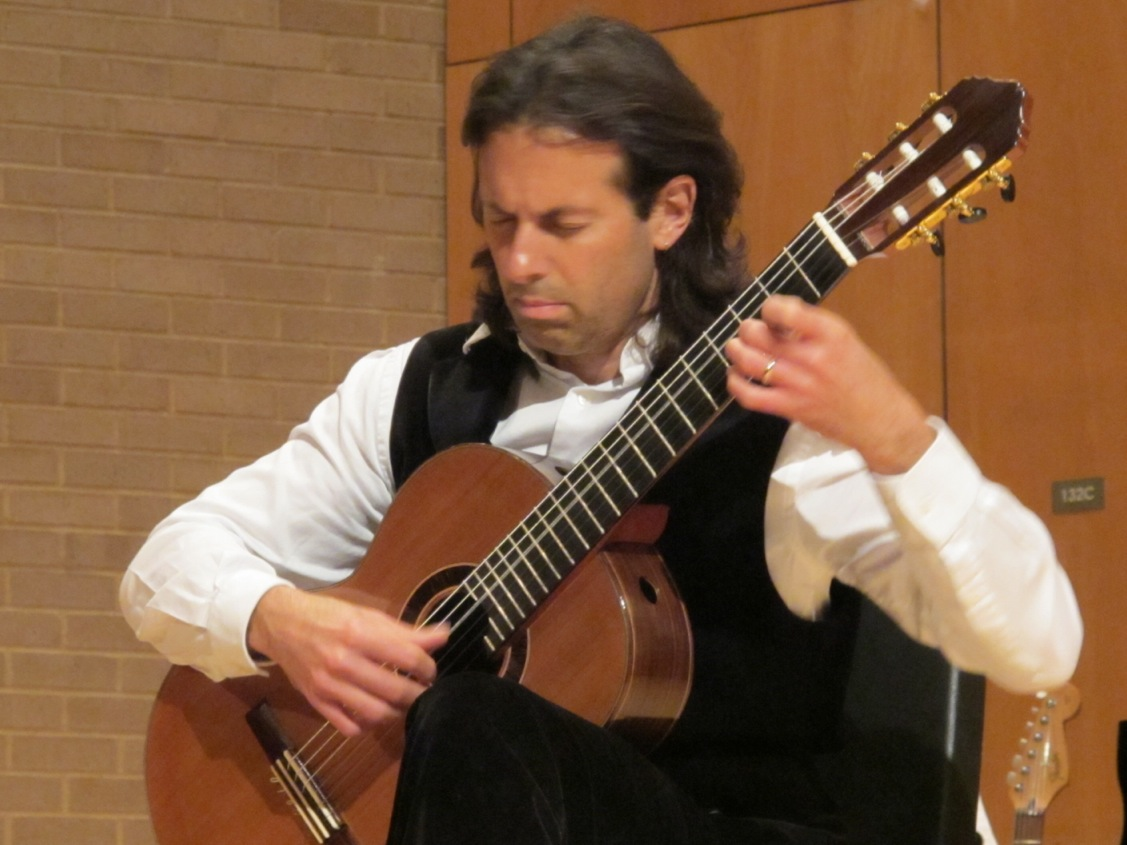
Michael Nicolella performing in Houston, TX 2012

Michael Nicolella (born December 31, 1963, in Providence, RI) is an American classical guitarist and composer. Described as an iconoclast, he is known for his versatile, adventurous and eclectic approach to repertoire, including the incorporation of electric guitar into his concert programs and recordings. Nicolella's repertoire ranges from the Baroque to the present. His most recent recording is his own arrangement of the complete cello suites of Johann Sebastian Bach; while his past four recordings focused on contemporary music, including his own compositions, alongside those of Toru Takemitsu, Elliott Carter, Luciano Berio, Hans Werner Henze and Steve Reich. He has championed music by such emerging composers as Laurence Crane and Jacob ter Veldhuis and has premiered many works written for him by other composers, including: Joshua Kohl, (of the Degenerate Art Ensemble), David Mesler, Christopher DeLaurenti and John Fitz Rogers, who in 2001 wrote the forty-five-minute piece Transit for Nicolella, scored for electric guitar and computer generated sound. His own compositions include works for solo guitar, chamber music with guitar, a classical guitar concerto (Guitar Concerto), and an electric guitar concerto (Ten Years Passed). His most recent major composition for soprano, guitar (electric and classical) and orchestra, The Flame of the Blue Star of Twilight, was premiered by the Northwest Symphony Orchestra and soprano Alexandra Picard in April 2012. He has performed and collaborated with a wide range of groups and artists including: violinist Gil Shaham, rock singer Jon Anderson, best known for his work as lead vocalist in the progressive rock band Yes, broadway legends Bernadette Peters and Brian Stokes Mitchell, the Seattle Guitar Trio, jazz singer Johnaye Kendrick, classical music comedians Igudesman and Joo and is a frequent guest with the Seattle Symphony. Nicolella is a graduate of Yale University, Berklee College of Music and the Accademia Musicale Chigiana. He is currently based in Seattle, where he serves on the music faculty of Cornish College of the Arts. He is married to the painter Ann Gale.

== Discography ==
- Complete Bach Cello Suites (arranged for guitar) (2015)
- Ten Years Passed (2010)
- Shard (2005)
- Transit (2002)
- Push (2000)
- Bach, Britten, Martin (1993)

== Selected Compositions ==
Orchestral Music:

- The Flame of the Blue Star of Twilight (soprano, guitar and orchestra)
- Ten Years Passed (electric guitar and orchestra)
- Guitar Concerto (classical guitar and orchestra)

Chamber Music:

- Seeking, Searching and Hunting (guitar trio)
- La Vals Eterna (guitar orchestra)
- Four Sketches (cello and guitar)
- Bridges (flute, violin, guitar and percussion)

Solo Guitar Music

- Prelude
- Toccata and Fugue
- Surfacing Through the Mire
- Three Brief Episodes
- Immortal Autumn
- Three Sketches of Goya
