= Laura Young =

Canadian classical guitarist

Laura Young (born 24 November 1962) is a Canadian classical guitarist.

She was born in Toronto, Ontario, Canada and now lives in Barcelona, where she teaches at the Escola Superior de Música de Catalunya since 2003. As a soloist Laura has given widely acclaimed performances, offering profound and often daring programs in concert halls around the world, from the Alte Oper in Frankfurt, Germany, to the National Arts Centre in Ottawa, Canada, to the Auditorio Nacional in Madrid, Spain. She is also a regularly invited performer and teacher in International Guitar Festivals: Iserlohn, Germany; Toronto; Esztergom, Hungary; Gdansk, Poland; Cologne, Germany; and Volos, Greece.

In addition to her solo career, Laura was a founding member of the very successful Trio de Cologne, which performed throughout the 1990s in Europe and the Americas. Laura is currently working in duo with the Greek-Canadian singer Frances Pappas in the ensemble Lagrimosa Belta which presents pieces written for them by composers such as Helmut Jasbar, Feliu Gasull i Altisent, Stefan Hakenberg all based on contemporary explorations of traditional folk music.

Laura is currently working on incorporating bowed string expressive playing to current classical guitar performance in her doctoral research (at the Ghent Orpheus Institute in Belgium), which focuses on the performance of solo violin and solo cello works by Max Reger.

From 1997 to 2001, Young was the founder and Artistic Director of the Amsterdam International Guitar Festival.

In October 2014, she was appointed full professor of guitar at the Mozarteum in Salzburg, Austria.

== Recordings ==
- Solo (AS 2017 2, Al Segno, marketed by artelier media)
  mp3: Joaquin Turina – Sevillana (Fantasia)
- Laura Young & Frances Pappas
  Works for guitar and voice by Granados, Domeniconi, Theodorakis and Jasbar. (Bridging Arts)
- DEWA
  Stefan Soewandi – Guitarworks II (double CD)
  CD 1: Zoran Dukic: Träumerei über ein javanisches Volkslied (Reverie on a Javanese Folk-Songs)
  CD 1: Siegbert Remberger: Fantasia on a Theme by Tárrega
  CD 1: Carlo Marchione: Kamajaya
  CD 2: Laura Young: Dewa – Seven Short Etudes
  CD 2: Enno Voorhorst: Irrlicht – Sonate
  CD 2: The Guitar4mation: Ismaya – Sonatina II for Guitar Quartet
  CD 2: Martin Schwarz: Six Studies of a Dream
- 1996 – Solo. With original Works by Carlo Domeniconi, Oliver Hunt, Vaclav Kucera, Hans Werner Henze, Joaquin Turina, Nikita Koshkin.
- 1998 – Trio de Cologne: Juegos del Viento
- For GHA recording label in Brussels, Belgium. Works by Bela Bartok, Carlo Domeniconi, Igor Strawinsky, Dusan Bogdanovic, Eric Satie, Paul Hindemith.
- 1991 – Trio de Cologne: La Belle Excentrique. Works by Claude Debussy, Georges Bizet, Eric Satie and Gabriel Faure.
- 2000 – Dewa. Collaboration project with music by Stephan Soewandi
- 2014 – Lagrimosa Belta with mezzo-soprano Frances Pappas, with works by Carlo Domeniconi, Dusan Bogdanovic, Mikis Theodrakis, Feliu Gasull, Stefen Hakenburg.
