= Mårten Falk =

Swedish guitarist

Mårten Oskar Falk (born 1973) is a Swedish classical guitarist. He studied at the Conservatory of the Ecole Normale de Musique de Paris under Alberto Ponce.

Falk has toured in Sweden, Norway, Finland, Germany, Holland, Russia, Ukraine, Japan, Canada, Peru, Chile, Argentina. He has collaborated with composers from many countries, such as Angelo Gilardino and Sven-David Sandström and has made over 100 world premieres of new music.

Mårten Falk has released twelve CDs, including seven solo albums with the company dB Productions, including The Electric Guitar Experience (2004). Falk is also adept at playing the vihuela, baroque guitar, lute, romantic guitar and the Russian seven-stringed guitar.
