= Kaori Muraji =

Japanese classical guitarist (born 1978)

- Born: 14 April 1978, age 47; Tokyo, Japan
- Education: Ecole Normale de Musique de Paris

Kaori Muraji (村治佳織, Muraji Kaori; born 14 April 1978) is a Japanese classical guitarist. She is the first Japanese artist to have signed an exclusive international contract with Decca Music Group.

== Biography ==
Muraji learned to play the guitar from the age of 3 on. First she was taught by her father and from the age of ten by the guitarist Shin-Ichi Fukuda. In the early 1990s she won several guitar competition in Japan and in 1993 gave her debut recital in the Tsuda Hall. In the same year she published with Espressivo, her first album, with her Orchestra debut happening in the following year with the Japan Philharmonic Orchestra.

In 1997, she moved to Europe to study under Alberto Ponce at the Ecole Normale de Musique in Paris. After her graduation in 1999, she moved back to Japan.

== Discography ==
- Espressivo
  Kaori Muraji, guitar
  21 October 1993: Victor Entertainment
- GREEN SLEEVES
  Kaori Muraji, guitar
  21 January 1995: Victor Entertainment
- sinfonia
  Kaori Muraji, guitar
  24 July 1996: Victor Entertainment
- Pastorale
  Kaori Muraji, guitar
  21 November 1997: Victor Entertainment
- CAVATINA
  Kaori Muraji, guitar
  21 November 1998: Victor Entertainment
- Concierto de Aranjuez
  Kaori Muraji, guitar
  Kazufumi Yamashita, conductor
  New Japan Philharmonic
  23 March 2000: Victor Entertainment
- Resplandor De La Guitarra
  Kaori Muraji, guitar
  Orquesta de Cámara Joaquín Rodrigo
  24 April 2002: Victor Entertainment
- LA ESTELLA
  Kaori Muraji, guitar
  21 February 2004: Victor Entertainment
- Transformations
  Kaori Muraji, guitar
  Dominic Miller, guitar
  21 July 2004 (Japanese Release)
  March 2005 (International Release): Decca Music Group
- Spain
  Kaori Muraji, guitar
  21 October 2005: Victor Entertainment
- lumières
  Kaori Muraji, guitar
  26 October 2005 (Japanese Release)
  February 2006 (International Release): Decca Music Group
- Lyre & Sonnet/Into the Light
  Kaori Muraji, guitar
  The Sixteen, choir
  Harry Christophers, conductor
  25 October 2006 (Japanese Release)
  Spring, 2007 (International Release): Decca Music Group
- Amanda
  Kaori Muraji, guitar
  Michiru Oshima, conductor
  ORCHESTRE DES VIRTUOSES DE PARIS
  25 April 2007 (Japanese Release)
- Kaori Muraji plays Bach
  Kaori Muraji, guitar
  Christian Funke, conductor
  Bachorchester, Leipzig
  1 January 2008
- Viva! Rodrigo
  Kaori Muraji, guitar
  Victor Pablo Pérez, conductor
  Orquesta Sinfónica de Galicia
  4 February 2008: Decca Music Group
- Portrait
  Kaori Muraji, guitar
  5 April 2010: Decca Music Group
- Rhapsody Japan
  Kaori Muraji, guitar
  26 October 2016
- Soleil – Portraits 2
  Kaori Muraji, guitar
  Soichi Muraji, guitar
  26 October 2016
- Cinema – Movie Themes For Classical Guitar
  Kaori Muraji, guitar
  Soichi Muraji, guitar
  22 March 2019
