= Maria Kämmerling =

German musician (born 1946)

Maria Kämmerling (born 20 February 1946) is a German classical guitarist.

Kämmerling was born in Leverkusen and studied with Karl Scheit in Vienna (until 1971), after which she moved to Denmark, teaching at the Royal Danish Academy of Music at Aarhus. She is best known for her interpretations of contemporary guitar music, including pieces by Gunnar Berg, Axel Borup-Jørgensen, Cristóbal Halffter, Vagn Holmboe and Bruno Maderna. She also played in a duo with her husband Leif Christensen.

== Selected discography ==
- Gunnar Berg: Fresques pour guitare seule (Paula Records Pacd 09, 1979)
- Vagn Holmboe: Sonatas & Intermezzi (Paula Records Pacd 30, 1983)
- Maderna/Halffter/Borup-Jørgensen (Paula Record Pacd 60, 1988)
