= Luise Walker =

Austrian classical guitarist and composer

Luise Walker (9 September 1910 – 30 January 1998) was an Austrian classical guitarist and guitar composer – one of the most prominent female guitarists of her time.

== Life and career ==
Walker was born in Vienna and began studying guitar at the age of eight. Initially a student of Josef Zuth, she subsequently studied at the University of Music and Performing Arts, Vienna, with Jakob Ortner. She also took lessons with Heinrich Albert, Miguel Llobet, both of whom were frequent guests at her parents home, also with Andrés Segovia and Emilio Pujol.

From 1940, she devoted her life to the guitar. She gave concerts internationally, touring through many parts of Europe, Russia and the United States. For many years she taught guitar alongside Karl Scheit at the University of Music and Performing Arts. She was also a respected composer for the guitar, writing studies, solos and transcriptions.

== Writings ==
- Ein Leben mit der Gitarre (Frankfurt: Zimmermann, 1989); ISBN 3-921729-37-8.

Klein Romanze
