= Hucky Eichelmann =

German musician

Hucky Eichelmann (born March 1956) is a German classically trained world guitarist, living most of his life in Asia, particularly in Thailand, where his name has become "synonymous with the classical guitar".

== Studies ==
Master's degree at the State Academy of Music and Dramatic Arts, Stuttgart.

== Biography ==
Eichelmann originates from Sulzburg in Markgräflerland in south-west Germany. He has lived in Thailand since 1979, where his recordings of the music of King Bhumibol have made the classical guitar a fashionable instrument.

Though holding a master's degree in classical music, Eichelmann has developed his own diverse musical repertoire bridging the cultures of East and West as well as those of classical with folk and popular music.

Eichelmann has promoted Asian music throughout the world. His recordings are among the bestselling guitar recordings worldwide.

== Collaborations ==
Hucky has collaborated with Ravi Shankar, Richard Harvey, Nina Corti and Carlos Bonell, played alongside such guitarists as John Williams, David Russell, Jorge Morel, Paco Peña, Los Angeles Guitar Quartet, Juan Martin, Costas Cotsiolis and Kazuhito Yamashita.

== Performances ==
He has performed at guitar festivals in Germany, Great Britain, Thailand, Singapore and Australia. He was also invited to perform his last concert of the 20th century at the headquarters of the United Nations in New York City.

Eichelmann has performed various Royal Command Performances for members of the Thai Royal family and he has conducted popular guitar classes on Thai TV.

== Recordings ==
He has made recordings for Peacock, WEA, Pacific, EMI and AMI Records.

== Educational work ==
Between 1978 and 2000 Eichelmann held teaching positions at the University of the Philippines, Chulalongkorn University, St. Cecilia Academy of Music and Mahidol University, Bangkok.

== Discography ==
- Magical Melodies of Thailand (2010). Thailand's most famous melodies arranged for acoustic guitar (AMI Records CD 2010–20)
- Tunes from the Heart (2020). (AMI Records Compilation CD 2020–01)
- ASEAN Guitar (2015). (AMI Records CD 2015-02 / LP 2015-05 / Sheet Music 2015–03)
- Guitar Favourites (2012). (AMI Records CD 2012–23)
- Magical Melodies of Thailand (2010). (AMI Records CD 2010-20 / LP 2014-02 / Sheet Music 2010–21)
- Sweet Words (2007). The music of His Majesty the King of Thailand Vol 2 (AMI Records CD 2007-12 / LP 2007-14 / Sheet Music 2007–13)
- Silk & Bamboo Tour (2005). Hucky & Harvey / Hucky & Harvey Band (AMI Records DVD 2005–10)
- Gamgah Gamgah (2003). Audiophile re-mastering of the 1984 recording (AMI Records CD 2003-09 / LP 2015-01 / Sheet Music 2016–35)
- Silk and Bamboo (2001). Hucky & Harvey (AMI Records CD 2001-05 / LP 2015–08)
- With Love from Asia (2000). (AMI Records CD 2000-02 / Sheet Music 2016–37)
- Candlelight Blues (1999). The music of the King of Thailand (AMI Records CD 1999-01 / LP 2014-01 / Sheet Music 1999–01)

- Sai Fon (Falling Rain) (1996).
- Gumgah Gumgah (1984).
- Khuen Nueng (One Night) (1981).

== Producer work ==
As a record and event producer he has worked with Ravi Shankar, Stuttgart Ballet, Chico & The Gypsies (formerly Gipsy Kings), Martin Taylor, Pat Metheny, George Winston and Les Ballets Jazz de Montreal to name but a few.

- 1984-1994 Director of the Bangkok International Guitar Festival and Series
- 1996-2000 Director of the Thailand Festival of the Arts and Thailand Festival Series
- 1996-2004 Artistic Director of the Markgraefler Gitarrentage, Germany
- Since 1997 Director, Musician & Producer for Asia Music Internatial Ltd.
