= Stanley Yates =

English-born guitarist and editor (born 1958)

Stanley Yates (born 25 October 1958) is an English-born classical guitarist and a prolific editor of 19th- and 20th-century music for the guitar.

== Biography ==
Yates was born in Preston, Lancashire, and studied at Liverpool University and the Sandown College of Performing Arts with Neil Smith. A prize winner of the Myra Hess Trust, he performed widely in the United Kingdom and continental Europe. Since 1990, Yates lives in the United States, initially as a doctoral teaching fellow at the University of North Texas where he studied with Thomas Johnson. In the same year he won the bronze medal at the GFA Guitar Competition of the Guitar Foundation of America (GFA).

For his thesis at the University of North Texas, he received the Morgan Dissertation Award for Excellence in Music Performance. He is a dedicated performer of contemporary guitar music and has also brought neglected nineteenth-century guitar composers to renewed attention, such as Charles Doisy and Ernest Shand, by publishing modern editions of their works, recording them on CD, and including them in his concert repertoire. His numerous editions and arrangements are published in the Stanley Yates Series by Mel Bay Publications (and with Chanterelle Verlag, ClearNote Music and his own imprint, CGS).

Since 1994, Yates has directed the guitar program at the Austin Peay State University in Tennessee. In 2000, he was elected to the artistic advisory board of the Guitar Foundation of America. He has published widely in guitar journals around the world.
