= Ernest Shand =

English performer and composer (1868–1924)

Ernest Shand (born Ernest William Watson; 31 January 1868 – 29 November 1924) was an English performer and composer for the classical guitar, and a music hall singer and actor.

== Biography ==
Ernest William Watson was born into a musical family in Hull, Yorkshire, his mother having been a piano teacher, his father a music dealer, and his brother an actor. He began his musical education on the violin. He came to the guitar when he discovered a composition for guitar by the Spanish composer Dionisio Aguado. Viewing it as a challenge, he bought a guitar and practised until he could play it. He then became a pupil of Madame Sidney Pratten (1821–1895) who provided him with scores and became the first publisher of his compositions. These apparently impressed her so much that by 1888 she apparently had nothing more to teach him, and that his pieces were superior to hers. Before the age of 30, Shand had already written more than 150 pieces for solo guitar, a guitar concerto (the first from the British Isles) and a tutor (1896). In the United Kingdom, his playing remained unsurpassed until the emergence of Julian Bream in the late 1940s.

Despite his success as a composer and performer, the guitar was a relatively small niche in England. Shand made his living mainly from acting in music halls, and only late in life was persuaded by his wife and friends to take up the guitar professionally. Even then he had to return to acting after he had lost money in a studio and advertising business. As an actor, he travelled as far as Australia, where he also gave guitar recitals. Shand moved to London in 1896, where he was elected to the Senate of the London Guild of Violinists and gave a well-received series of performances at the Royal College of Music. During one of his tours, he was apparently attacked by an aggrieved Russian and sustained severe injuries that affected him for the rest of his life.

Shand published his last music around 1910, after which he moved to Mosley, Birmingham. At the outbreak of World War I, he entertained British troops on the guitar. He died in Birmingham.

== Music ==
As a composer, Shand was able to sustain the growth of the classical guitar against the popularity of large orchestras by writing music that brought guitar composition to a more modern approach. Shand produced a wide range of music including salon pieces, dances, variations, fantasias, songs, chamber music, piano pieces, transcriptions and pedagogical works. "All of these compositions are filled with unbridled individualism; lyrical pieces that are peppered with the suggestion of song."

== Selected compositions ==
Guitar solo

- March of the Pixies, op. 16 (Bournemouth: Barnes & Mullins, 1896)
- Danse capriccio, op. 28
- 1er Air varié, op. 31 (London: Boosey & Co., 1893)
- Mazurka, op. 36 (London: Schott, 1895)
- Mélodie. Nocturne, op. 51 (London: Schott, 1895)
- Souvenir (A Memory), op. 53 (London: Schott, 1897)
- 3 Pièces faciles, op. 56; includes 1. Inquiétude (Sorrow), 2. Espérance (Hope), 3. Joie (Joy) (London: Schott, 1895)
- Songe d'amour, op. 57 (London: Schott, 1896)
- Calme du soir (Rest at Eventide) et Berceuse (Lullaby), op. 58 (London: Schott, 1896)
- Fantaisie irlandaise, op. 59 (London: Schott, 1897)
- Andante espressivo, op. 60 (Bournemouth: Barnes & Mullins, 1896)
- Andante Caprice, op. 65 (London: Schott, 1896)
- Tsigane, op. 66 (Bournemouth: Barnes & Mullins, 1896)
- Gavotte et Méditation, op. 69 (London: Schott, 1896)
- Sorrow and Song, op. 70
- Scène de Ballet, op. 72 (Bournemouth: Barnes & Mullins, 1896)
- The Gnomes, op. 77
- Andante religioso, op. 87
- Danse antique, op. 88
- Funeral March, op. 89
- Songes d'été, op. 95 (London: Schott, 1897)
- Hungarian Dance, op. 96
- Morceau lyrique No. 1, op. 97 (London: Schott, 1897)
- Cradle Song, op. 99
- Morceau lyrique No. 2, op. 104
- Impromptu, op. 108
- Marche triomphale, op. 109
- Morceau lyrique No. 3, op. 111
- Vain regrets. Mélodie, op. 112 (London: Schott, 1897)
- A Forgotten Strain, op. 116
- Auf Wiedersehn, op. 117
- Phyllis. Gavotte, op. 200 (London: Schott, c.1912)
- Légende, op. 201 (London: Schott, c.1912)
- Au Coin de feu. Souvenir, op. 202
- Varsovie. Mazurka, op. 204
- La Danse des nymphes. Petit morceau, op. 205
- Introduction et chanson, op. 220

Chamber music

- Premier Concerto, op. 48, for guitar and string quartet or piano
- L'Absence. Mélodie, op. 122, for mandoline and piano (London: Schott, 1898)
- Danse bacchique, op. 125, for mandoline and piano (London: Schott, 1898)
- A Dream of Love, op. 127, for mandoline and piano (Bournemouth: Barnes & Mullins, 1896)

Songs

- Gondoliera, with accompaniments for banjo, guitar or piano (Bournemouth: Barnes & Mullins, 1896)
- Consequences (Roland Carse), with piano (London: Hopwood & Crew, 1900)
- Euclid (C.H. Taylor), with piano (London: Price & Reynolds, 1902)
- Little Mary (C.H. Bovill), with piano (London: E. Ascherberg & Co., 1903)
- Why Does a Lady? (George Arthurs), with piano (London: Shapiro, von Tilzer Music Co., 1907)
- Where Blighty Is. Humorous song (Fred Austin), with piano (London: Reynolds & Co., c.1918)

Tutor

- Improved Method for the Guitar, op. 100 (Bournemouth: Barnes & Mullins, 1896)

Other

- Ours, I think?. Valse, for piano (London: Metzler & Co., c.1912)

== Modern editions ==
- Ernest Shand: First Concerto op. 48, ed. by Matanya Ophee (Columbus, Ohio: Éditions Orphée, 1999).
- Ernest Shand: 23 Guitar Solos from Victorian England, ed. by Stanley Yates (Pacific, Missouri: Mel Bay, 2000).
- Selected Works by Ernest Shand, ed. by Peter Jermer (Tokyo: Gendai Guitar Co., 2003).

== Recordings ==
- Ernest Shand - Guitar Music, performed by Alberto La Rocca (10-string guitar), on Brilliant Classics 96435 - 3CD box (2021). Contains 60 solo guitar pieces: Study, from op. 2; Divertimento, op. 6 (1911); Farewell, op. 10 (1911); March of the Pixies, op. 16 (1896); Study from op. 19 (1896); Mazurka Russe, op. 21 (1896); Dance Capriccio, op. 28 (1897); Graceful Dance (Morceau de salon), op. 29 no. 2 (1896); Mazurka, op. 36 (1896); Study for the R. H. (from op. 41); Study on Repeated Notes, from op. 43 (1893); Mélodie-Nocturne, op. 51 (1893); Souvenir, op. 53; An Evening Rêverie, op. 54 (1896); 3 Pièces faciles, op. 56 (1896: I. "Inquiétude", II. "Espérance", III. "Joie"); Songe d'Amour (Introduction et Romance), op. 57 (1896); Calme du soir et Berceuse, op. 58 (1895); Fantaisie irlandaise, op. 59 (1894); Andante expressivo (Air for the Guitar), op. 60 (1896); Andante Caprice, op. 65 (1894); Tsigane (Gipsy Dance), op. 66 (1896); Gavotte et méditation, op. 69 (1896); Sorrow and Song, op. 70 (1904); Scène de ballet, op. 72 (1896); The Gnomes (Pièce caractéristique), op. 77 (1897); Andante, op. 86 (1896); Andante religioso, op. 87 (1896); Dance Antique, op. 88 (1895); Funeral March, op. 89 (1895); March, op. 91 (1897); Songes d'été, op. 95 (1897); Hungarian Dance, op. 96 (1898); Morceau lyrique No. 1, op. 97 (1897); Cradle Song, op. 99 (1896); A Fragment (Prelude, from Improved Method), op. 100 (1896); Morceau lyrique No. 2, op. 104 (1896); Impromptu, op. 108 (1896); Marche triomphale, op. 109 (1896); Morceau lyrique No. 3, op. 111 (1906); Vain Regret, op. 112; A Forgotten Strain, op. 116 (1896); Auf Wiedersehn, op. 117 (1896); Autumn Leaves, op. 129; Phyllis-Gavotte, op. 200 (1903); Légende, op. 201 (1903); Au coin de feu, op. 202 (1903); Varsovie Mazurka, op. 204 (1903); A Nymph's Dance (Petit Morceau), op. 205 (1903); Introduction et chanson, op. 220 (1903); Six Pièces (1899, without opus number: 1. "Chanson", 2. "Valse legère", 3. "Gavotte Rococo", 4. "Prélude et impromptu", 5. "Chant du soir", 6. "Il pensieroso"); Forever (1904, without opus number).
- Guitar Masterpieces, performed by Manuel Gayol, on: Kapp KC-9052-S, LP (1960). Contains: Prélude et impromptu.
- Ernest Shand. Guitar Music and Songs, performed by Peter Jermer (guitar) and Yoshiko Nitta (soprano), on: Outsider CD 0122, CD (1996). Contains: (solo pieces) Prélude et impromptu, Gavotte rococo, Andante religioso, Légende, A Forgotten Strain, Mazurka russe, Chanson, Valse légère, Varsovie mazurka, A Fragment, Phyllis Gavotte, Il pensieroso, Au coin du feu (Fireside Musings), Songe d'amour, Cradle Song, Auf Wiedersehn; (songs) Gondoliera, The Voice of Love.
- The Romantic Guitar, performed by Gerald Garcia, on: Beautiful Jo Records BEJO-CD 17, CD (1997). Contains: Chanson, Gavotte rococo, Légende, Prélude et impromptu, Souvenir; also works by Francisco Tárrega, Alberto Obregon, Napoleon Coste, Madame Sidney Pratten, and Felix Mendelssohn-Bartholdy (arr. Garcia).
- Kazuhito Yamashita Plays His Favorites, 2, on: Crown CRCC-29, CD (1999). Contains: Vain Regrets, op. 112.
- Forever: 30 Guitar Miniatures, performed by Jonathan Richards on: Diversions DDV 24119, CD (2006). Contains: Forever and Air for the Guitar
- More-ish Melodies (The Music of Ernest Shand), performed by Jonathan Richards: Private Release, CD (2017). Contains: Andante religioso, Forever, Sorrow and Song, Chanson, Andante expressivo, Moorish Melody, Cradle Song, Morceau lyrique No. 2, Funeral March, Légende, A Fragment from Improved Method, Berceuse, Exercise No. 68 in C minor, Exercise No. 52 in C major, Varsovie mazurka in E Major
- Fogli d'album, performed by Alberto La Rocca, on: GuitArt CD 10 (2015). Contains: Légende, The Gnomes, Morceau lyrique No. 2, Prélude et impromptu, Andante expressivo, Au coin de feu, Introduction et Chanson, Tsigane.

== Bibliography ==
- Stewart W. Button: The Guitar in England 1800–1924 (New York: Garland Publishing, 1989); i.e. Ph.D. dissertation of University of Surrey, 1984 (available as an open access document).
- Stewart W. Button: "Ernest Shand: An Introduction to his Life and Music", in: Guitar Review no. 106, Summer 1996, p. 2–8.
- Stanley Yates: "Preface", in his edition Ernest Shand: 23 Guitar Solos from Victorian England (Pacific, Missouri: Mel Bay, 2000), p. 3–7.
