= Prince Claus Conservatoire =

Dutch music school

The Prince Claus Conservatoire (Dutch: Prins Claus Conservatorium) is one of the nine conservatoires in the Netherlands. It is a constituent of the Hanze University of Applied Sciences in Groningen.

Students normally specialize in one instrument within the classical or jazz music division. Students can also train to become conductors, composers, and music teachers.

== Teachers ==
Classical

- Paul Komen
- Tamara Poddubnaya
- Nata Tsvereli
- Erwin Wiersinga
- Sietze de Vries
- Wolfgang Zerer
- Johan Hofmann
- Jan van Zelm
- Manon Heijne
- Egbert Jan Louwerse
- Fie Schouten
- Frank Mulder
- Reinier Hogerheyde
- Marije van der Ende
- Peter Stam
- Frank Brouns
- Auke van der Merk
- Hessel Buma
- Jilt Jansma
- Dick Bolt
- Joeke Hoekstra
- Luuk Nagtegaal
- Manja Smits
- Ilona Sie Dhian Ho
- Sonja van Beek
- Veselina Manikova
- Kati Sebestyen
- Romana Porumb
- Ervin Schiffer
- Gisella Bergman
- Jan Ype Nota
- Michel Strauss
- Corine 't Hoen
- Sorin Orcinschi

Jazz

- Joris Teepe (nl)
- Mark Haanstra (de)
- Jan Voogd
- Koos Wiltenburg (nl)
- Freddie Bryant
- Winfred Buma
- Jonathan Kreisberg
- Frank Wingold
- David Berkman
- Marc van Roon
- Jasper Soffers
- Don Braden
- Michael Moore
- Miguel Martinez
- Ralph Peterson
- Steve Altenberg
- Joost van Schaik
- Sam Burtis
- Jilt Jansma
- Brian Lynch
- Cajan Witmer
- Kurt Weiss
- Dena DeRose
- Francien van Tuinen
- Floor van Zutphen

Conducting—Choir

- Louis Buskens

Conducting—Wind Band

- Tijmen Botma
- Klaas van der Woude

Composition, Music & Studio Productions

Music in Education

- Kees van der Meer
- Lieuwe Noordam
- Aletta Kwant
- Floor Pots

Other subjects

- Geert-Jan van Bergen Beieren en Henegouwen
- Wiebe Buis
- Karolien Dons
- Remco de Haan
- Leendert Runia
- Ruurd Salverda
- Johannes Terpstra
- Sietze de Vries

== Former teachers ==
- Wieke Karsten
- Sabrina Vlaškalić
