= Luis Romero (footballer, born 1990) =

Argentine footballer

Personal information
- Full name: Luis Abel Romero
- Date of birth: 29 August 1990 (age 36)
- Place of birth: Mar del Plata, Argentina
- Height: 1.69 m (5 ft 7 in)
- Position: Forward

Senior career*
Years	Team	Apps	(Gls)
2010–2011	Vélez Sarsfield	0	(0)
2012–2013	Unión San Felipe	13	(1)
2012	→ Deportes Puerto Montt (loan)	1	(0)
2012	Unión San Felipe B	6	(1)
2013	Germinal Rawson	–	(–)
2014	Macará		
2016–2017	Sportivo Rivadavia	26	(2)
2019	Juventud Unida RC	12	(0)
2023–2024	Studebaker	8	(1)
- * Club domestic league appearances and goals

Luis Abel Romero (born 29 August 1990) is an Argentine football forward.

== Teams ==
- (Argentina) Vélez Sarsfield 2010–2011
- (Chile) Deportes Puerto Montt 2012
- (Chile) Unión San Felipe B 2012
- (Chile) Unión San Felipe 2012–2013
- (Argentina) Germinal Rawson 2013
- (Ecuador) Macará 2014
- (Argentina) Sportivo Rivadavia 2016–2017
- (Argentina) Juventud Unida de Río Cuarto 2019
- (Argentina) Studebaker 2023–2024
