= Luis T. Romero =

American guitarist and composer (1854–1893)

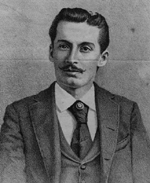
- Portrait of Luis T. Romero (Taken in 1889)

Background information
- Born: Luis Toribio Romero; 1854; San Luis Obispo, California, U.S.
- Origin: California
- Died: November 19, 1893 (aged 39) Boston, Massachusetts, U.S.
- Genres: Classical music, Romantic music
- Occupations: Classical guitarist and composer
- Instrument: Classical guitar
- Years active: c. 1870–1893
- Labels: Jean White Publishing Co.; Wise & Co.
- Formerly of: La Lira de Orfeo

Luis Toribio Romero (1854 – November 19, 1893) was an American classical guitarist and composer of Spanish Californio heritage. Emerging as one of the earliest notable figures in American classical guitar music, Romero developed a distinguished career as a performer, composer, and teacher in California and later Boston. He contributed significantly to the promotion of plucked-string instruments, founding one of the first mandolin and guitar clubs on the West Coast. Through his compositions, arrangements, teaching, and performances in salons, civic events, and parlour concerts, Romero helped establish a foundation for classical guitar in the United States, leaving a lasting legacy within American music history.

== Early life and musical education ==
Luis T. Romero was born in San Luis Obispo, California in 1854. His family was of Spanish descent and had migrated to California before his birth. Growing up after the Gold Rush, he was exposed to a blend of Mexican Californian and European musical traditions. He began playing the guitar as a child, quickly developing advanced skill. Although little is documented about his early general education, by his teens he was proficient enough to pursue formal musical training.

Romero moved to Los Angeles in his youth to study under Miguel S. Arévalo, a prominent guitarist whose mentorship greatly influenced his style and technique. He was also connected to the San Francisco music scene, where his playing reflected broader influences of the period.

== Professional career ==
=== Career in California ===
After completing his musical studies, Romero began his professional career in San Jose, California, during the mid-1880s. He regularly performed solo guitar recitals at salons, civic events, and private gatherings across San Jose, Oakland, Santa Cruz, and Stockton, helping popularise the classical guitar among California's growing middle class. In addition to performing, Romero taught private lessons, fostering a community of amateur guitarists who contributed to the region’s lively musical culture.

In 1887, Romero co-founded La Lira de Orfeo with mandolinist Samuel Adelstein, forming one of the first mandolin and guitar clubs on the U.S. West Coast. The ensemble, comprising mandolins, guitars, violins, and cellos, performed arrangements of European classical works and contemporary popular music. Their debut concert on May 24, 1888, was widely praised for showcasing the expressive range of plucked-string instruments.

Romero also began publishing his compositions and arrangements during this period, including an early solo guitar version of "La Paloma" published in San Francisco in 1889. His California works blended Romantic European styles with Latin American folk influences, reflecting the cultural crosscurrents of post-Gold Rush California. By the late 1880s, his reputation had grown enough to attract attention from musicians and publishers beyond the West Coast, leading to his eventual move to Boston.

=== Life and Career in Boston (1889–1893) ===
In 1889, Romero relocated to Boston, Massachusetts, seeking broader professional opportunities. Boston, already a major center for music publishing and performance in the late 19th century, offered Romero access to a vibrant artistic community and a growing demand for guitar and mandolin instruction. Upon his arrival, he quickly established himself as a respected teacher, attracting a steady stream of students from Boston’s Ideal Banjo, Mandolin, and Guitar Club — an ensemble that included many amateur and semi-professional musicians of the period.

Romero maintained a private teaching studio in Boston and frequently performed at concerts, society gatherings, and public events. A notable appearance occurred in 1890 in Winchester, Massachusetts, where he was billed as "Señor Luis T. Romero, the great Spanish guitar virtuoso." Contemporary reports, such as those from the Winchester Star, praised his performances as demonstrating "sweetness, fluency, and masterful command" of the classical guitar.

In addition to teaching and performing, Romero remained active as a composer and arranger. Between 1889 and 1893, he published a significant portion of his music through Jean White Publishing Co., based in Boston. His output during this period included virtuosic concert pieces, arrangements of operatic melodies, and popular folk-inspired works such as his celebrated guitar setting of "La Paloma" and fantasias based on Verdi’s Rigoletto.

Romero’s Boston years were marked by growing national recognition. Within the American guitar and mandolin communities he was regarded as a virtuoso and a pioneer of the instrument's acceptance in professional circles.

Tragically, Romero’s promising career was cut short when he died unexpectedly on November 19, 1893, at approximately 39 years of age. No detailed obituary survives beyond brief notices in contemporary music journals, though Philip J. Bone later remembered him in The Guitar and Mandolin (1914) as "the greatest guitarist of the Pacific Coast" and an artist whose contributions to early American guitar music were considerable.

== Notable compositions and arrangements ==
Romero composed numerous original works for solo guitar and arranged popular songs and operatic melodies. His music blends virtuosic technique with the Romantic style of the late 19th century. Notable compositions include:

- Fantasie Americaine (or Fantasia Americaine) – a showpiece with lyrical and bravura passages.
- Souvenir d'Amérique – likely drawing on American patriotic tunes.
- Dance pieces such as Bella Bocca Polka and Un Beso – Mazurka, reflecting the era's taste for social dance music.
- Two gavottes, Gavotta in D major and Gertrude Gavotte, which demonstrate his use of Baroque‑inspired forms.
- La Típica and a Barcarolle, surviving in manuscript or published form.
- Chamber works including a waltz duet for two guitars.

He is also remembered for his arrangements:

- La Paloma, the famous habanera by Sebastián Yradier, arranged for solo guitar and published in 1889.
- Selections from Giuseppe Verdi's Rigoletto for guitar, including a fantasia on its themes, published in San Francisco in 1889.
- Peruvian Air (Melodía Española) – an arrangement of a South American tune published in 1889.
- Arrangements of works by fellow composers such as Miguel S. Arévalo's La Súplica and Albert de Corbin's Santiago.

Many of his works were later reprinted in Jean White's Guitar Album series, reaching a national audience.

== Style, technique, and musical influence ==
Romero's playing was rooted in the mid-19th-century classical guitar tradition, combining Spanish and New World influences. Trained by Spanish and Mexican guitar masters, he developed a warm, expressive tone and refined technique. Contemporary descriptions note his ability to execute rapid arpeggios, Tremolos, and intricate arrangements on a single guitar.

== Collaborations and mentorships ==
Romero's career was enriched by both mentorship and collaboration. He studied with Miguel S. Arévalo in Los Angeles and connected with Manuel Ygnacio Ferrer in San Francisco. As a teacher, he instructed numerous students in San Jose and Boston; nearly every member of Boston's Ideal Mandolin and Guitar Club took lessons from him.

== Public reception and legacy ==
Romero was widely lauded by contemporaries on both coasts. West Coast publications praised his technical mastery and expressive tone, while Eastern periodicals such as S.S. Stewart's Banjo and Guitar Journal highlighted his success in Boston's musical circles, noting his ability to "captivate audiences with warmth and fluency."

=== Legacy and Influence ===
Romero's influence endured through his students and the dissemination of his published works. William Foden (1860–1947), a prominent American guitarist, studied under Romero in Boston and later credited him as a key inspiration. Guitar historian Vahdah Olcott-Bickford acknowledged Romero's contributions in shaping early American classical guitar culture in her writings, further cementing his posthumous reputation.

== Preservation of his works ==
Many of Romero's compositions are preserved in libraries, archives, and digital collections. Several original editions of his sheet music are part of the California Sheet Music Project at UC Berkeley and the International Music Score Library Project (IMSLP).

== See also ==
- Californio
- Classical guitar
- American classical guitarists
- La Lira de Orfeo
- Samuel Adelstein
- Romantic music
