= Élie Ossipovitch =

French classical guitarist (born 1987)

- Born: December 10, 1987 (age 38); Burgundy
- Genres: Western Classical
- Occupation: Musician
- Instrument: Guitar
- Years active: 2007–present

Élie Ossipovitch (born 10 December 1987) is a French classical guitarist, who studied in the Conservatory of Chambéry, and followed private lessons with prominent French classical guitarists. He has been performing as well as teaching across Europe and India for the last five years. His repertoire includes pieces from the sixteenth century to today.

== Biography ==
As a teenager Ossipovitch started with heavy metal and eventually moved on to classical guitar. He took private lessons from some of the prominent classical guitarists from various parts of France. For further professional studies Elie joined the Conservatoire de Chambéry. During that period he started teaching in the Conservatoire d'Albertville, in several associated schools as well as private classes. Gradually he started performing in musical festivals, in churches and private concerts.
