= Petar Čulić =

Petar Čulić (born June 26, 1986 in Split, Croatia) is a classical guitarist.

He finished his master's degree at the Split music Academy in the class of prof. Goran Listeš, and continued to study at the Koblenz Guitar Academy with Hubert Käppel. He won 23 first prizes on national and international competitions and had more than 1000 performances all around the world.

He plays the Concierto de Aranjuez by J. Rodrigo, the most famous guitar concierto.

The French composer Colette Mourey wrote a piece for guitar solo named Sonata Appassionata, Hommage à Petar Culic, so Petar Čulić got his hommage at the early age of 24.
