= Dang Ngoc Long =

Vietnamese musician and actor

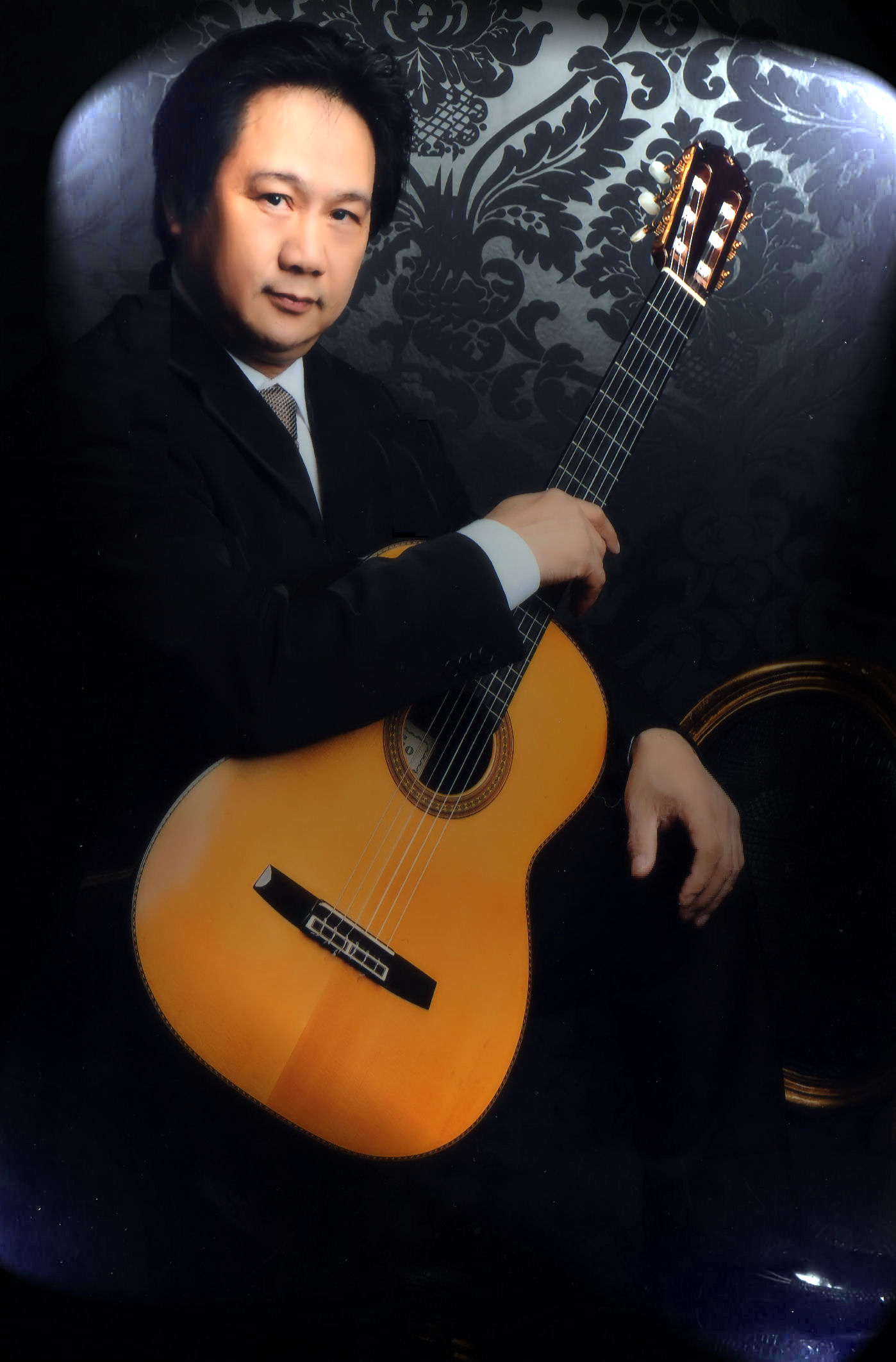
Prof. Dang Ngoc Long

Dang Ngoc Long is a Vietnamese concert guitarist, composer and actor. He studied classical guitar in Hochschule für Musik "Hanns Eisler" Berlin. Today he lives in Berlin and is the art director of the International Guitar Competition & Festival Berlin and director of the music school Berlin Gesundbrunnen.

== Biography ==
From 1985 to 1990 he completed his classical guitar studies with Inge Wilczok at the "Hanns Eisler" musical academy in Berlin. From 1990 to 1993 he received a scholarship for concert master studies. Dang Ngoc Long received a special award at the international guitar competition (1987-Esztergom-Hungary). He gave concerts in Hungary, Italy, Spain, Czech Republic, France, Austria, among others. Dang Ngoc Long was awarded the title of an honorary professor of the University of Kirgysia. He is director of the music school Berlin Gesundbrunnen. He is also art director of the International Guitar Competition & Festival Berlin.

He composed many works for guitar solo, duo, trio, and quartet: "Tay Nguyen Gebirge", Erinnerung, Prelude No. 1, Mienman, Beo dat may troi – Vietnam Folk Song, Fantasie in G-Dur, Kreislauf, Gian ma thuong, Prelude No. 4. Many pieces were chosen as test pieces for the international guitar competition: Prelude No. 1, Mienman, For Thay, Bamboo-Ber, Gian ma thương, Prelude No. 4, Morning-Mai, Beo dat may troi, "Ru con", "Rain", "The Central Highlands of Tay Nguyen".

Since 2012 he is undergoing a Special Actors Coaching by Kristiane Kupfer and worked in many movie productions under the name of "Long Dang-Ngoc".

== Compositions ==
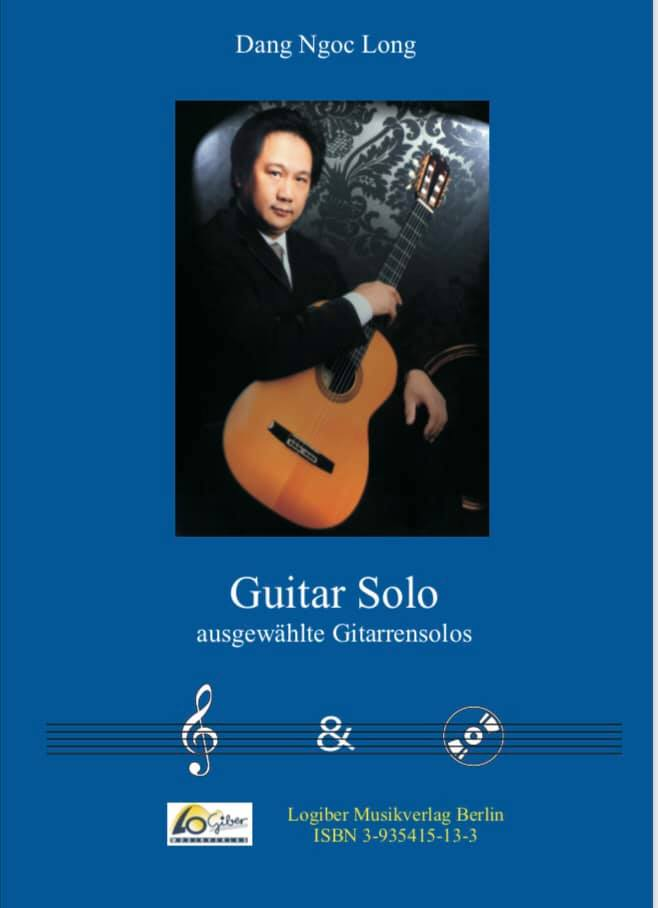
The Best Guitar Solos - Dang Ngoc Long

- Bamboo-Ber
- "Das Entengrün treibt im Wasser, am Himmel ziehen die Wolken"
- Blumen blühen
- Die Erde dreht sich (Trio)
- Etüde Nr. 1
- Etüde Nr. 11
- Etüde Nr. 21
- Etüde Nr. 31
- Etüde Nr. 41
- Etüde Nr. 51
- Fantasie in D-Dur
- Suite Kieu (Tổ khúc Kiều)
- Faust Sonata
- Fantasie in G-Dur
- Fantasie no. 1
- Fantasie no. 11
- Fantasie no. 21
- Fantasie no. 2
- For Thay
- For You
- Für immer
- Gian ma thương (Vietnamesisches Volkslied)
- He du, tanz mit mir !
- Erinnerung
- Komm’ zu mir !
- Kreislauf (4 Guitar)
- Mein singendes Herz
- Meine Gitarre
- Menuett
- Meo
- Mienman
- Modern
- Taynguyen Gebirge (Guitar solo)
- Taynguyen Gebirge (Guitar & Orchestra)
- O Solo Mio! (G. Capurro & E. Di Capua)
- Pama (duo)
- Prelude No. 1
- Prelude No.4
- Prelude No.11
- Wiegenlied (dân ca Nam bộ)
- Schwerttanz
- Serenade
- Sommer
- The Entertainer (Scott Joplin)
- Tinh trang
- Tuoi mo
- Wals No. 1
- Wals No. 2
- Schwettanz II
- Ru con
- Rain

== Filmography ==
- 2011: I Phone You (Cinema)
- 2011: Der Kriminalist (TV-Series)
- 2012: Allein unter Nachbarn (Movie)
- 2012: Year of the Dragon (Movie)
- 2013: The Stalker (Movie)
- 2014: Kommissarin Lucas (TV-Series)
- 2014: VW Beijing (Advertisement)
- 2014: Alle unter eine Tanne (Movie)
- 2015: Ein starkes Team (TV-Series)
- 2016: Krauses Glück (Movie)
- 2017: Obst & Gemüse (Short Movie)
- 2017: Die Kanzlei (TV-Series)
- 2018: Blossoms in the Dark (Kurzfilm)
- 2018: You are wanted 2 (Amazon-Series)
- 2018: IKEA (Advertisement)
- 2018: Der Spezialist (TV-Series)
- 2018: Das Chinesische Licht (TV-Series)
- 2018: SOKO Leipzig (TV-Series)
- 2019: Krauses Umzug (TV movie)
- 2019: Hausen (Sky-Series)
- 2020: Morden im Norden (TV-Series)
- 2023: Kalt
- 2023: Wer wir sind
- 2023: Made in Germany
- 2024: Kanzlei Liebling Kreuzberg

== Discography ==
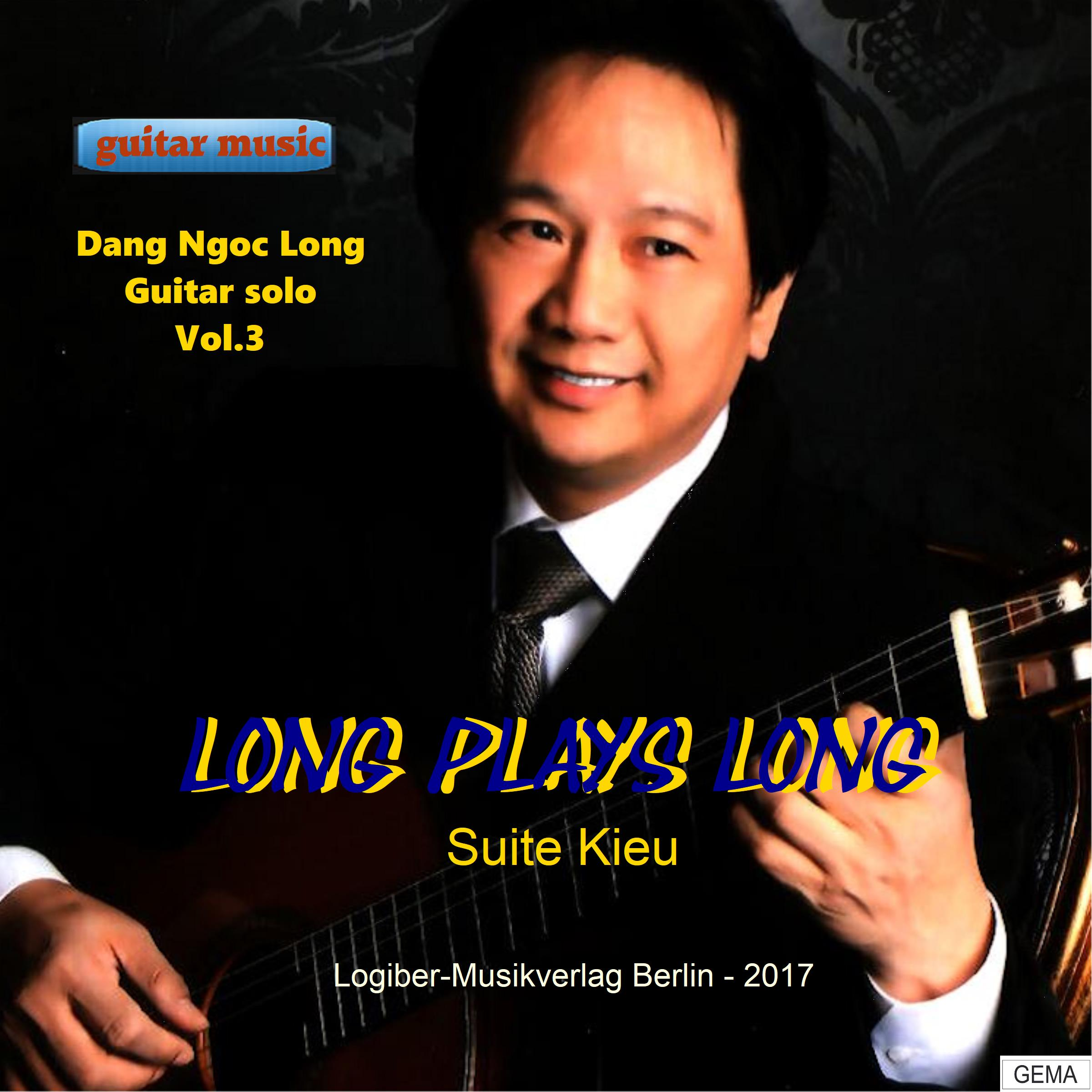
CD Long Plays Long - Suite Kieu

- CD1 – Guitar music vol.1 (1997)
- CD2 – Long plays Long (2009)
- CD3 – Long plays Long-Suite KIEU (2016)
- CD4 – Long plays Long-Faust
- CD5 – Long plays others (2020)
- CD6 – Long plays Others 2
- CD7 – Nghe em hat loi yeu (2015)
- CD8 – Loi ca toi viet (2017)
- CD9 – Tinh yeu mua dong (2017)
- CD10 – Ha noi toi oi (2018)

== Publications ==
- 2009: Gitarrenschule 1
- 2014: Long Plays Long
- 2017: Suite Kieu
- 2019: Guitar Solo, Ausgewählte Gitarrensolos
- Works by Dang Ngoc Long in the Deutschen Nationalbibliothek
