= Daniel Chabrun =

French conductor (1925–2006)

Daniel Chabrun (26 January 1925 – 12 December 2006) was a French conductor.

== Life ==
Born in Mayenne, Chabrun pursued both graduate studies in literature and music under the direction of Yves Nat (piano), Henri Challan and Fernand Lamy (harmony, counterpoint, and fugue) and Louis Fourestier (conducting). In 1954, he won a first prize in conducting at the Conservatoire de Paris.

Chabrun is Officier of the Ordre des Arts et des Lettres and Commander of the National Order of Merit.

He died in the Val-de-Grâce in Paris at age 81 and is buried in the family vault in Crémieu (Isère).
