= Leif Christensen =

Danish musician

Leif Christensen (1950–1988) was a Danish classical guitarist.

Christensen was born in Århus, Denmark, where he studied theory and history of music at the University of Århus and guitar at the Royal Academy of Music. He then studied with Konrad Ragossnig at the Basel Music Academy, after which he returned to Århus. His recording debut came in 1981 with an LP of music by the 19th-century composer and guitarist Giulio Regondi.

Christensen was the first guitarist to record both of the Royal Winter Music sonatas by Hans Werner Henze, and also made recordings of music by Fernando Sor and Vasilii Sarenko, the latter on a Russian seven-string guitar.

In addition to his solo performances and recordings, Christensen played in a duo with his wife Maria Kämmerling, also a respected solo artist. They made three records together.

Christensen died in a car crash in 1988, in Denmark approx. 20 km outside Aalborg, Roldskov(a wood) due to a slippery icy road.
