= Marc Ongley =

Australian guitarist and composer

Marc Ongley (born 13 December 1952) is an Australian classical and jazz guitarist, composer, and teacher. He lived in the United Kingdom from 1991 to 2019. Born in Maitland, New South Wales, he became the first Australian to be awarded the Licentiate of the Trinity College of Music, London (LTCL) and the Fellowship of the Trinity College of Music London (FTCL), in 1974 and 1977 respectively. The Sydney Morning Herald described Ongley as "one of Australia's finest classical guitarists". Ongley studied with the renowned Australian music educator Don Andrews and famous classical guitarists Alirio Diaz and Turibio Santos, students of Andrés Segovia. He recorded and released several classical and jazz albums throughout the 1980s and 1990s. More recently, Ongley released albums in the genres of blues and rock.

== Career ==
Marc Ongley started his career as a rock guitarist in the band Maya, from Newcastle, New South Wales. The group was an opening act for the Beach Boys at two concerts during their 1970 tour of Australia. Maya finished fourth in Hoadley's Battle of the Sounds in 1970 at the Capitol Theatre, Sydney.

Ongley's first transcription for solo guitar was published in 1973 by J. Albert and Son, an interpretation of Ludwig van Beethoven's "Für Elise".

In 1979 Ongley performed for the Australian High Commissioner, Gordon Freeth, at Australia House, London, playing the piece "Cello Suite No.1" by Johann Sebastian Bach. His first public professional performance in the UK took place on 6 September 1981 at the Wigmore Hall, London. This concert received attention in the Australian press. The Sydney Morning Herald noted that "Australia, with a few exceptions such as John Williams, is not known for its classical guitarists" and therefore it was a "high honour" for Ongley to perform at the Wigmore Hall.

In 1993 Ongley collaborated with British trumpeter Steve Waterman and bass player Laurence Cottle to release his first jazz record, Song for Ros, recorded at Abbey Road Studios on 24 April 1993. Gramophone reviewed the record, writing that "Ongley is a young...guitarist who plays clean, inventive lines with gentle good taste and minimum amplification". The review went on to recognize "Ongley's most welcome new talent". The 1994 edition of The Penguin Guide to Jazz on CD rated the album 3 stars, describing Ongley as "a decent writer in a romantic vein. The title piece and 'My Funny Valentine' are both nice performances, but he's probably at his best in a medium tempo...Respectably produced as well".

== Education ==
Ongley gained a Licentiate (1974) and Fellowship (1977) in the discipline of music, awarded in Sydney by an international examiner from the Trinity College of Music, London. He studied with Don Andrews and two renowned students of Andrés Segovia: Alirio Diaz and Turibio Santos.

== Discography ==
Title	Year	Release type
Cantabile for Strings	1974	Single
The Marc Ongley Jazz Quartet ‘A Day at Abbey Road, Pt.2’	1993	EP
Guitar Recital	1998	Album
Gentle Rain	1998	Album
Moonlight Sonata	2000	Album
When I’m Sixty-Four	2000	Single
Symphony No.1 in C Major ‘Alpha’	2002	Single
String Quartet No.1 in C Major ‘Spifire’	2002	Single
Guitar Recital 2	2002	Album
You Are the Sunshine of My Life	2002	Album
The Awakening	2008	Album
Where I Could Not Follow	2013	Single
Summer Song	2013	Single
When Two Worlds Meet (feat. George Golla)	2013	Single
The Marc Ongley Jazz Quartet ‘A Day at Abbey Road’	2013	EP
The Girl from Ipanema	2014	Album
Twenty First Century Blues	2014	Album
New Guitar Concerto 2018 - Concerto pour Laube	2018	Single
My Music For Classical Guitar	2018	Album
My Latin and Swing Tunes	2018	Album
Lullaby for Jess	2018	Single
Till There Was You	2019	Single
Symphony No.2 in F Major ‘Spring’	2020	Single
Ten Thousand Miles	2021	Album
How High the Moon	2022	Album
Swing Along	2022	Album
Solaris	2022	Album
African Adventure	2022	Album
Autumn in the Valley	2022	Album
In a Musical Moment	2022	Album
Touches of Spain	2022	Album
Purple	2023	Album
Steel Spring	2023	Album
My Duets for Guitar and Other Stringed Instruments	2023	Album
Pure	2023	Album
My Jazz Ballads	2023	Album
My Music for Flute and Guitar	2023	Album
Train Ride	2023	Album
July	2023	Album
Free Falling	2023	Album
Native American	2023	Album
Inner Space	2023	Album
Nylon String Blues	2023	Album
Me and My Guitar	2023	Album
Romance	2023	Album
Ninety Five Degrees	2023	Album
Summer Rise	2023	Album
Waves in the Sand	2023	Album
Classic Improvisations	2024	Album
Classic Improvisations, Pt. 2	2024	Album
Sailing	2024	Album
An Intimate Space	2024	Album
In the Live Room	2024	Album
Merci Beaucoup	2024	Album
I Wonder	2024	Album
Mosaic	2024	Album
In the Positive	2024	Album
Rainbow	2024	Album
Más España	2024	Album
Festa de Rua	2024	Album
Nineteen Sixty Eight	2024	Album
Feliz	2024	Album
Espana	2024	Album
Shades of Django	2024	Album
Contemporary Classical Classical Improvisations	2024	Album
My Jazz Waltzes	2024	Album
Inspiration from Brazil	2024	Album
The Old Bridge	2024	Album
Electric October	2024	Album
Chasing the Rainbow	2024	Album
Majestic Sunset	2024	Album
Canzone	2024	Album
C’est 12	2024	Album
Diversão	2024	Album
Spring in the Valley	2024	Album
Acoustic Journey	2024	Album
Blues 72	2024	Album
Mysterious Island	2024	Album
Just for Johnny	2024	Album
Out of Somewhere	2024	Album
In the Mid Distance	2025	Album
Weekend Chill	2025	Album
Solitude	2025	Album
The Church	2025	Album
Molto Bella	2025	Album
Singing Octaves	2025	Album
Ad Libitum	2025	Album
Le doux reve	2025	Album
Latin Afternoon	2025	Album
Down by the Lake	2025	Album
Atmospheric	2025	Album
100 Times Over	2025	Album
Symphony No. 3 in Bb Major ‘The Jazz’, Symphony No. 4 in D Minor ‘Winter’	2025	Album
Sextet in D Major - Quintet in F Major	2025	Album
Expo 88	2025	Album
Delightful Jazz Duets	2025	Album
Musings	2025	Album
Electric Pursuit	2025	Album
Luz do Dia	2025	Album
Steel on Wood	2025	Album
Up Close	2025	Album
Just Solo	2025	Album
In the Middle	2025	Album
Unaltered	2025	Album
Sunny Blue	2025	Album
A Lovely Journey	2025	Album
La Dolce Notte	2025	Album
Up Jumped Summer	2025	Album

== Books ==
- Guitar for Everyone Book 1 (London: Natural Light, 2000).
- Rock 'n' Blues: Guitar for Everyone (London, Natural Light, 2000).
- Guitar for Everyone Book 2 (London: Natural Light, 2001).
- Guitar for Everyone Book 3 (London: Natural Light, 2001).
- Guitar for Everyone: First Steps 5yrs + (London: Natural Light, 2006).
