= An Tran (guitarist) =

Vietnamese classical guitarist

An Tran Trần Tuấn An
- Born: Hanoi, Vietnam
- Genre: Classical
- Occupations: Musician, educator
- Instrument: Classical guitar
- Labels: Naxos, Frameworks Records
- Website: antran.org

An Tran (Vietnamese: Trần Tuấn An) is a Vietnamese classical guitarist and educator. Based in Chicago, he is noted for incorporating Vietnamese traditional music into classical guitar performance alongside standard repertoire. Tran is co-founder and artistic director of Chicago Artopia, founder of the NIU International Guitar Series, and Professor of Guitar at Roosevelt University and the University of Illinois Chicago. His recordings for Naxos and independent labels have been reviewed by international publications including the Chicago Tribune, Classical Guitar Magazine, and MusicWeb International.

== Early life and education ==
Tran was born and raised in Hanoi, Vietnam. His parents were music enthusiasts, and his father placed a radio near his mother during pregnancy, which Tran later credited with his earliest connection to music. He tried different instruments as a child but found the guitar particularly motivating. Inspired by his cousin’s guitar playing and by listening to rock and roll, he decided to pursue the instrument.

At 15, he moved to the United States as an international student. During this period he temporarily quit the guitar, until encouragement from guitarist Anne Waller in Chicago renewed his focus. He earned his BA in Music from North Park University studying with Julie Goldberg and Tom Zelle. He was named a Lincoln Academy Student Laureate.

Tran earned a Master of Music degree from Yale University, studying under Benjamin Verdery. In 2016, he won First Prize at the Hamilton International Guitar Competition in Ontario, Canada. He completed his DMA at Northwestern University in 2023 under Anne Waller.

== Career ==
Tran released his debut album, Stay, My Beloved (2020), featuring classical guitar arrangements of Vietnamese folk songs. His second album, Napoléon Coste: Guitar Works, Vol. 6, was released by Naxos in 2023.

He has performed widely across the U.S. and abroad, including appearances at Northwestern University’s Segovia Classical Guitar Series, the New Orleans International Guitar Festival at Tulane University, the New York Classical Guitar Society (Salon Series, Tenri Cultural Institute, 2023), The Little Theatre in Rochester, Stroede Center for the Arts, and Austin Classical Guitar.

As an educator, Tran teaches at Roosevelt University’s Chicago College of Performing Arts, the University of Illinois Chicago, and Northern Illinois University’s School of Music where he directs the NIU International Guitar Series. He co-founded Chicago Artopia, a nonprofit presenting free concerts on Chicago’s Southwest Side, and founded An Tran's International Guitar Workshop in Hanoi. He is a D’Addario Artist.

== Critical reception ==
Tran’s Boston debut was described by The Boston Globe as demonstrating “quiet virtuosity”, and his debut album was listed among the “most alluring classical recordings of 2020” by the Chicago Tribune. Classical Guitar Magazine praised its blending of Vietnamese melodies with classical technique, while Tonebase called it “a beautiful testament to Tran’s artistry.”

Six String Journal described the recording as “gorgeous” with particular commendation for phrasing and tone. Performance Today featured him on a national broadcast. In Vietnam, Vietnam Airlines Heritage profiled his cultural role, and Nhân Dân emphasized his work in presenting Vietnamese guitar internationally.

In a 2021 review for All Classical Guitar, Chris Dumigan praised An Tran's performance of Juan Erena's Find You Again on the album El Eterno Viaje, describing the piece as "a wonderful, sad, haunting piece of considerable length" and saying that it was "played beautifully by An Tran". Dumigan also noted that the recording was made in Chicago. In a 2022 review for Melómano Digital, Sara Guerrero Aguado praised Juan Erena's El eterno viaje, describing it as a cohesive album despite featuring different guitarists and highlighting the variety of interpretative approaches contributed by its performers. An Tran is one of the guitarists featured on the recording.

His Naxos release (2023) was praised by MusicWeb International for clarity and musicianship, and highlighted by Thanh Niên as a significant milestone for Vietnamese guitarists.

== Artistic vision ==
Tran has said, “The guitar is universal … I believe it can function as a bridge between Vietnamese music and Western classical music, and I view myself as a bridge.” About his debut album, he reflected, “My debut album is music that is close to me. It is composed of traditional Vietnamese songs my parents would sing to me.”

== Discography ==
- Stay, My Beloved (2020)
- El eterno viaje (Ziricote Records, 2021) — Juan Erena, various artists, including An Tran
- Napoléon Coste: Guitar Works, Vol. 6 (Naxos, 2023)
- Ilumina: New Works for Guitar (Prima Classic, 2026)

The album features works by Juan Erena, Olga Amelkina-Vera, Paul Ibbotson, Sara d’Ippolito Reichert, Khiem Nguyen-Duy and Nathan Stade.

== Awards ==
- First Prize, Hamilton International Guitar Competition (2016)
- First Prize, New Orleans International Guitar Competition (2018)
- First Prize, University of Rhode Island Rising Stars Competition (2018)
- Lincoln Academy Student Laureate, Illinois (2012)
