= Roland Dyens =

French classical guitarist, composer, and arranger

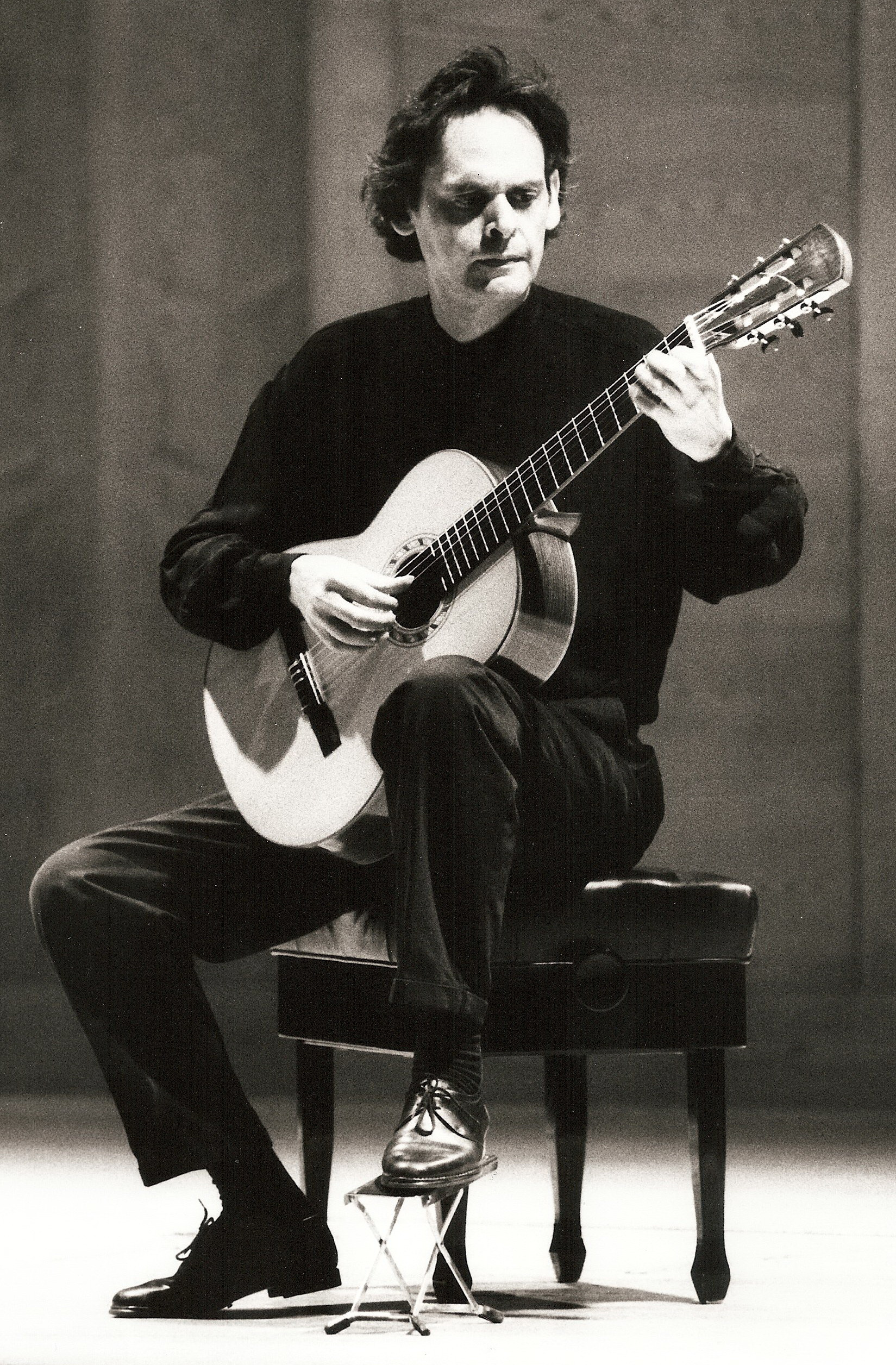

Roland Dyens (French: [ʁɔlɑ̃ djɑ̃s]) (19 October 1955 – 29 October 2016) was a French classical guitarist, composer, and arranger. He is considered one of the greatest guitarists of his time.

== Life and career ==
Dyens was born in Tunisia and lived most of his life in Paris. He studied with Spanish classical guitarist Alberto Ponce and with Désiré Dondeyne.

As a performer, Dyens was known for improvisation. Sometimes he opened his concerts with an improvised piece, and he might improvise the program itself, without planning or announcing beforehand what he would be playing. He said that a journalist once told him he had the hands of a classical musician but the mind of a jazz musician. He played Bach suites and he played with jazz musicians at the Arvika Festival in Sweden. A heavy metal band did a version of the third movement of his Libra Sonatine.

Dyens released several volumes of arrangements that included not only the classical music of Fernando Sor but also the Brazilian music of Heitor Villa-Lobos, jazz standards by Thelonious Monk, the French pop of Edith Piaf, and the Gypsy jazz of Django Reinhardt.

Tango en Skaï (1985) is one of his best-known pieces, but also widely played is the more extended Libra Sonatine (1986) written in three movements: "India", "Largo", "Fuoco", composed after Dyens had heart surgery. "Its three movements are an explicit portrayal of that very particular period of my life: first the chaotic India (before the operation), then the Largo (during it) and finally the Fuoco, in which the unrestrained rhythms depict a veritable incarnation of my return to life (and several guitarists often play this last movement as an independent piece)" quotes Dyens. "Skaï" is a French slang term for imitation leather and here refers to the gauchos (cowboys) of Argentina and southern Brazil who are known for their leather outfits.

He taught at Conservatoire National Supérieur de Musique in the position held by his teacher, Alberto Ponce. He died on 29 October 2016 at the age of 61.

== Awards and honors ==
- International Competition Città di Alessandria, Italy, 1979
- Grand Prix de Académie Charles Cros, Villa-Lobos Concerto for Guitar and Small Orchestra

== Selected list of works ==
- 20 Lettres Pour Guitare Solo
- Alba Nera (solo guitar)
- Aria (guitar quintet)
- Austin Tango (4 guitars or ensemble)
- Brésils (4 guitars or ensemble)
- Chansons françaises Vol.1 (solo guitar )
- Chansons françaises Vol.1 (solo guitar - tablatures)
- Chansons françaises Vol.2 (solo guitar)
- Citrons doux et le Quatuor Accorde (solo guitar)
- Concertino de Nürtingen (solo guitar & guitar ensemble)
- Concerto en si (solo guitar & guitar ensemble)
- Concerto métis (guitar & piano)
- Concerto métis (solo guitar & string orchestra)
- Concertomaggio (2 guitars and string orchestra)
- Comme un rond d'eau (4 guitars)
- Côté Nord (2 guitars)
- Côté Sud (guitar octet - quartet possible)
- Eloge de Léo Brouwer (solo guitar)
- El último recuerdo (solo guitar)
- Hamsa (4 guitars or guitar ensemble)
- Hommage à Franck Zappa (solo guitar)
- Hommage à Villa-Lobos (solo guitar)
- L.B. Story (solo guitar)
- Les 100 de Roland Dyens (solo guitar)
- Libra Sonatine (solo guitar)
- Lulla by Melissa (solo guitar)
- Mambo des Nuances et Lille Song (solo guitar)
- Mes arrangements à l’amiable (solo guitar)
- Muguet et L’Allusive (solo guitar)
- Rossiniana n°1 d’après Mauro Giuliani (solo guitar & string quartet)
- Rythmaginaires (guitar octet)
- Saudade No.3 (Solo guitar)
- Santo Tirso (solo guitar)
- Songe Capricorne (solo guitar)
- Suite Polymorphe (4 guitars or guitar ensemble)
- Tango en Skaï (solo guitar & string quartet)
- Tango en Skaï (solo guitar)
- Triaela (solo guitar)
- Trois (3) pièces polyglottes - Valse des loges, Flying Wigs & Sols d’Ièze (solo guitar)
- Trois Saudades
- Valse des anges - Angel's waltz (solo guitar)
- Valse en skaï (solo guitar)
- Variations sur un thème de la "Flûte Enchantée" Mozart/ Sor (4 guitars or guitar ensemble)
- Ville d'Avril (4 guitars or guitar ensemble)
- Ville d'Avril (solo guitar)

== Selected discography ==
- 1987 Villa-Lobos: Concerto/Suite Populaire Bresilienne/Choros, No. 1/Dyens: Hommage a Villa-Lobos
- 1995 Chansons Françaises 1
- 1997 Paris Guitare
- 1999 Nuages: Solo Guitar Works
- 2001 Roland Dyens: Citrons doux
- 2001 20 Lettres Pour Guitare Solo
- 2003 Night and Day
- 2007 Rodrigo: Concierto de Aranjuez; Dyens: Concerto métis
- 2007 Sor & Giuliani
- 2009 Naquele Tempo
- 2015 Night and Day/Visite au Jazz
