= Zoran Dukić =

Croatian classical guitarist

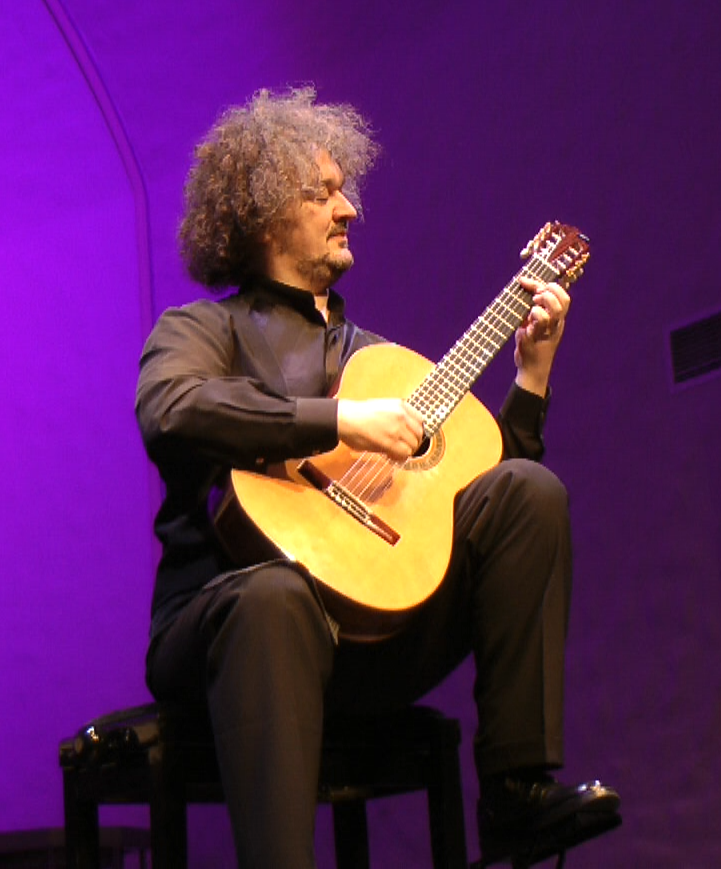
Zoran Dukić in concert

Zoran Dukić (born 1969 in Zagreb) is a Croatian classical guitarist. Between 1990 and 1997, Dukić won more competitions than any other guitarist had at the time.

== Life ==
He started to play the guitar at the age of six. He graduated from the Music Academy of Zagreb with Darko Petrinjak and completed his studies with Hubert Käppel at the Hochschule für Music in Cologne, Germany.

He teaches at the Koninklijk Conservatorium in The Hague and is a visiting artist at Royal Welsh College of Music & Drama. He was previously on faculty at the Escola Superior de Música de Catalunya in Barcelona as well as the Hochschule für Musik in Aachen.

Serbian guitarist Sabrina Vlaškalić studied with Dukic at the Royal Conservatory of the Hague. She said his teaching focused on auditory rather than technical skills. He would have her listen and then imitate the subtle differences in the performances of Julian Bream or Ida Presti.

== Recordings ==
- Bach-Piazzolla (GC04ZOR-17, GuitarCoop) - Recording: 2017
- Balkan Muses (GHA 126.068, GHA Records) - Recording: 2014
- Mario Castelnuovo-Tedesco: 24 Caprichos de Goya (8.572252, Naxos) - Recording: 2008
- DEWA, Stefan Soewandi - Guitarworks II (double CD) (kr 10043, Kreuzberg Records); Dukic and other guitarists - Recording: 1999
- Tárrega, Antonio José, Bach, Takemitsu (1023-OPE, Ópera tres) - Recording: 1996
- Printemps de la Guitare 94 (DMP 9522C, Plein Jeu) - Recording: 1994
