= John Couch (classical guitarist) =

New Zealand musician

John Couch is a New Zealand classical guitarist and currently based in Canberra, Australia

== Early life and education ==
Born in 1976 in Hamilton, New Zealand, Couch won 1st prize in the 1994 New Zealand Guitar Competition, which sparked his performing career.

Studying under Gunter Herbig, Couch completed his Bachelor of Music in Performance in Auckland in 1997. Couch continued his study at the Canberra School of Music, where in 1998 under Timothy Kain he gained his Post–Graduate Diploma (Performance and Research), followed by his Masters of Music in Performance in 2000.

== Recordings ==
Couch has released two solo CDs:

1. A Fairytale…with Variations (2001) 65m30s
2. Desdemona’s Song (2005) 66m22s

He has also released one CD in which he duets with Australian violinist Judith Hickel: Andre's New Shoes (2007)
