= Hubert Käppel =

German classical guitarist (born 1951)

Hubert Käppel (born 3 July 1951) is a German classical guitarist.

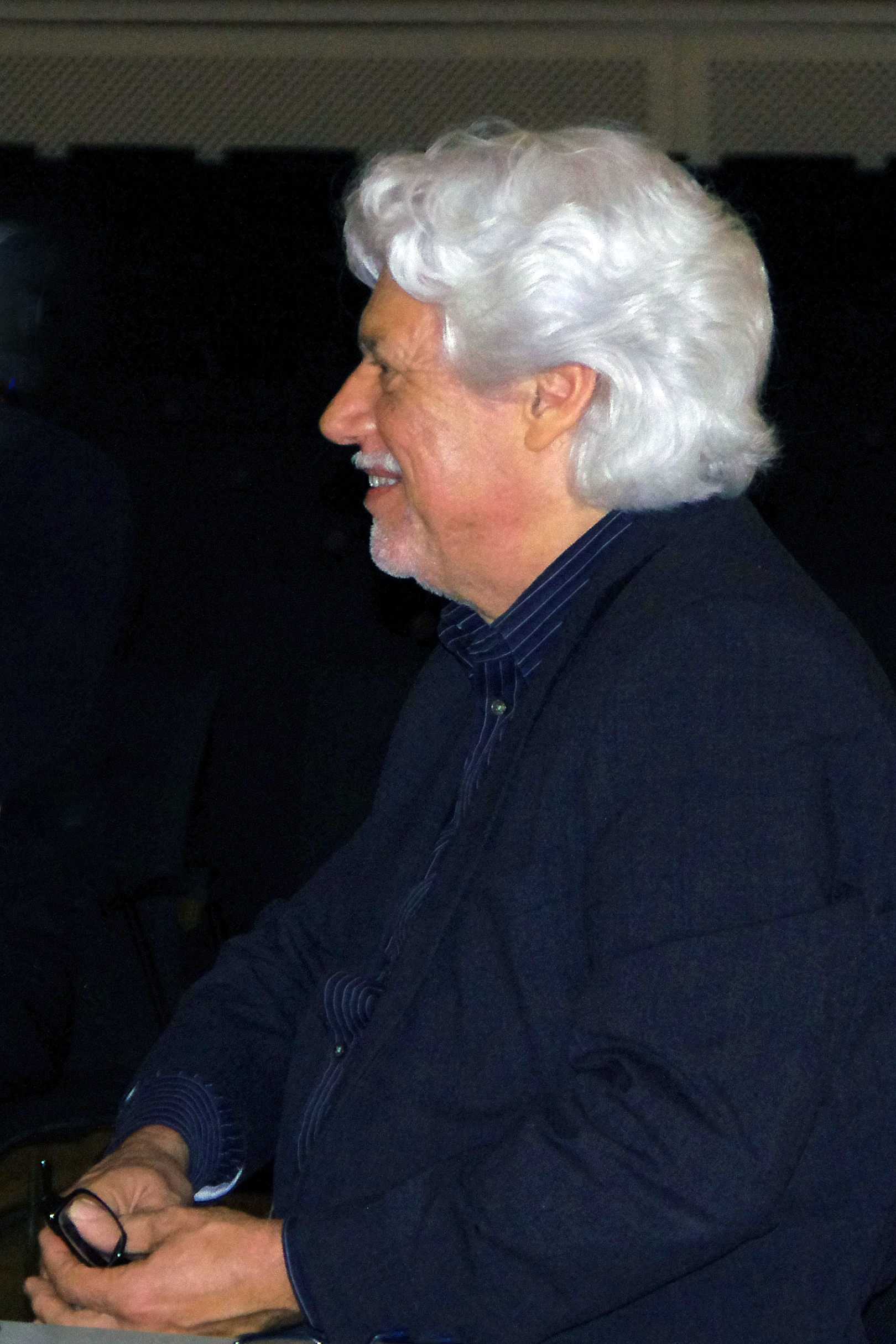
Hubert Käppel in 2018

He teaches classical guitar at the Hochschule für Musik Köln in Germany. Guitars International states that "Hubert Kappel is among the most influential teachers and guitarists of his generation." Among his most successful students are Zoran Dukić, Goran Krivokapić, Laura Young, Marco Socias, Àlex Garrobé, Thomas Offerman, Petar Čulić.

He has performed internationally, both as a solo artist and as part of "Fénix - International Guitar Quartet" (Hubert Käppel, Sotiris Malasiotis (Greece), Luciano Marziali (Italy) and Piraí Vaca (Bolivia)). He has released several recordings and music textbooks.
