= Alberto Ponce =

Spanish musician and teacher (1935–2019)

Alberto Ponce (born Alberto González Muñoz; 13 March 1935 – 26 July 2019) was a Spanish classical guitarist and teacher who from 1962 lived and taught in France.

== Biography ==
Alberto Ponce's father was his first teacher. When he was a child he entered the Municipal Conservatory of Barcelona, Spain, where, in addition to guitar, he studied piano, harmony and chamber music. He left the Conservatory with a diploma and an Honorable Mention. The Catalan musicologist and scholar Emilio Pujol advised him to enter the Lisbon Conservatory. After three years of study Ponce perfected his technique with him at the Accademia Chigiana di Siena, where he increased his knowledge of the music of the Spanish Golden Age.

In 1962, he won first prize for interpretation at the "Concours de Guitare" in Paris, organized by ORTF. In the same year Alfred Cortot, the director of the École Normale de Musique in Paris, asked him to teach there. There he had an unprecedented pedagogical career, having created one of the most prolific schools of contemporary guitar.

For many years Alberto Ponce was one of the few guitarists to dedicate himself continuously to both early and contemporary music. He influenced numerous artists, including Maurice Ohana, Chayne, Dyens, Ravier, Antonio Ruiz-Pipo, and Yoram Zerbib. He also taught at the National Conservatory of Paris.

== Discography ==
- L'art de la guitare
- Si le jour paraît. Composer: Maurice Ohana (1913–1992); Orquesta Filarmonica del Prado; Daniel Chabrun, conductor Arion ARN 38 240 (1974).

Students of Alberto Ponce who graduated from the Ecole Normale de Musique de Paris / Alfred Cortot

Diplôme de concertiste (Performer's Diploma)

1968 ‑ Richard Riera/ Leticia Alba

1969 ‑ Rafael Andia

1970 ‑ Geneviève Chanut /Jéromine Stefanaggi

1971 ‑ Arnaud Dumond

1972 ‑ Michel Coing

1973 ‑ Michelangelo Severi

1974 ‑ François Martin

1975 --------

1976 ‑ Roland Dyens / Fumito Kurosaka/ Santiago Rebenaque

1977 ‑ Y. Iwanaga/ Luis Martin Diego/ Y. Sakaï

1978 ‑ Pascal Boels /Mike Dezavelle/ Maryvonne Landreau /Shinishi Fukuda

1979 ‑ Philippe Azoulay

1980 ‑ Marianne Renno / Eladio Scharron

1981 ‑ Jean Bruno Rasoloarison / Benoit Schlossberg/ Dominique Daigremont

1982 ‑ Catherine Fayance / Carlos Marin

1983 - Carles Trepat/ Sylvain Cinquini/ François Laurent

1984 ‑ François Moriconi

1985 ‑ Guido Fichtner/ Walter Zanetti/ Dominiqiie Barzyk/ Laurence Munsch

1986 ‑ Stephan Schmidt /Isabelle Etinger/ Jean‑Pierre Cuisinier

1987 ‑ José‑Manuel Lopez‑Mendez

1988 ‑ Murielle Geoffroy / Brigitte Weiss / Richard Montembault / Monica Paolini

1989 ‑ Jérôme Guillien/ Sandro Torlontano/ Roland Ulrich

1990 --------

1991 ‑ Giorgio Albiani / Corinne Freyvogel/ Andréa Gasperi /Yoran Zerbib

1992 ‑ Alberto Vingiano /Roberto Spano/ Adriano Rullo / Marylise Florid.

1993 ‑ Danilo Leggieri/ Renaud Duret / Sylvie Burgos

Diplôme supérieur de concertiste (Advanced Performer's Diploma)

1980 ‑ Jean‑Marc Ankri

1981 ‑ Eladio Scharron

1982 ‑ Dominique Daigremont

1983 ‑ Jean Bruno Rasoloarison

1984 ‑ Claudio Marcottulli/ Tania Chagniot

1985--------

1986 ‑ Walter Zanetti/ / Guido Fichtner/ François Laurent

1987 ‑ Stephan Schmidt

1988 ‑

1989 ‑ Brigitte Weiss / José‑Manuel Lopez‑Mendez
