= Michele Pittaluga International Classical Guitar Competition =

"Michele Pittaluga" International Classical Guitar Competition Premio Città di Alessandria
- Michele Pittaluga Competition logo
- Awarded for: Excellence in Classical Guitar Performance
- Location: Alessandria
- Country: Italy
- Hosted by: Comitato Promotore del Concorso di Chitarra Classica "Michele Pittaluga - Città di Alessandria", President - Micaela Pittaluga, Artistic Director - Marco Tamayo
- Formerly called: Città di Alessandria International Classical Guitar Competition
- Rewards: 1st Prize €10,000, Naxos Records contract, concert tour
- First award: 1968
- Final award: 2017
- Website: www.pittaluga.org

The "Michele Pittaluga" International Classical Guitar Competition is an annual music competition for classical guitarists held in Alessandria, Italy. It was founded in 1968 and has earned an international reputation, entering membership of the World Federation of International Music Competitions - Geneve in 1981, ISPA (International Society for the Performing Arts) - New York in 2010 and UNESCO. It is the oldest active international classical guitar competition in Italy and one of the oldest in the world.

== Founders ==
The competition was started in 1968 by musicologist Michele Pittaluga (January 1915 – June 1995) as the "City of Alessandria Prize", to mark the 800th anniversary of the city. It gained early support from Andrés Segovia, who was the first Honorary President. Acting on his suggestion, Alirio Díaz was called to preside over the Jury for the first 30 editions, then acting as Artistic Director until the 40th edition, which is now overseen by Marco Diaz Tamayo. Alirio Díaz remained the Honorary President of the competition until his death in 2016.

== History ==
In the beginning, the competition was dedicated to solo guitar. For the first years, i.e. from the 7th to 11th edition, the performance was accompanied by the orchestra indeed, but the concerto was only partially performed. The competition winner would perform it in its entirety during the final awards ceremony. From the 12th edition, the final performance was accompanied by piano and only the competition winner performed the concerto with the orchestra during the awards ceremony. Occasionally, the performance with orchestra was substituted by a string quartet. The finals have involved orchestral or chamber music since 1974. Since 1981, in response to the directives of the WFIMC, the program of the Competition has been extended to repertoires with orchestra or string quartet.

The competition was made up of two rounds i.e. Qualifying Round and Final Round, from the year of establishment to 1996. Since the 30th edition, the competition has been made up of three rounds: Preliminary Round, Semi-Final Round, and Final Round.

After the death of Dr. Michele Pittaluga, in June 1995, the name of the competition was changed to "Michele Pittaluga International Guitar Competition - Premio Citta di Alessandria" and now organized by the Organising Committee of the Classical Guitar Competition "Michele Pittaluga" (Comitato Promotore del Concorso di Chitarra Classica "Michele Pittaluga") that has, as part of its constitution, the commitment to spreading the knowledge of the guitar repertoire, promoting new talents and supporting initiatives in favor of these goals. His three children, Maria Luisa, Micaela, and Marcello Pittaluga have been running the competition ever since. Micaela Pittaluga became the Head of Organising Committee, President of the Competition, and Marcello became the permanent Secretary of the Jury. Also, the same year Competition has been placed under the High Patronage of the President of the Republic of Italy and under the Patronage of UNESCO Italian Commission.

The value of the first prize has risen over the years from Italian Lire 500000 to Euro 10000. Naxos Records contract and a concert tour became repetitive parts of the award. The Golden Medal of the Presidency of the Italian Republic awarded since 1997.

== Correlated events ==
In 1997 a separate competition was created, entitled International Composition Competition for Classical Guitar "Michele Pittaluga" with the idea of expanding the contemporary guitar repertoire.

In 2014 the International Junior Talents Competition "Pittaluga Junior" was founded.

== International Classical Guitar Competition "Michele Pittaluga - Premio Città di Alessandria" ==
=== Rules ===
- The International Jury consisting of at least seven members of different nationalities with an established reputation in the music world.
- Representatives of the Italian Ministry of Culture (MBC), the Italian Ministry of the Education, University, Research (MIUR) and those of the WFIMC of Geneva will be allowed to assist the Jury without taking part in the voting.
- The first prize cannot be shared. In special cases, the International Jury may award remaining prizes equally.
- The competition consist of three rounds, each of them are public.
- The final round played with orchestra or string quartet.
- All composition are performed from memory.
- Soloists of all nationalities are admitted to enter the competition, provided that they are less than 33 years old.
- 1st Prize winners of the past editions are not permitted to participate.

=== Winners ===
Source Official webpage

| Edition | 1st prize | 2nd prize | 3rd prize | Year |
|---|---|---|---|---|
| 57 | (Spain) Ausias Parejo | (Germany) (Argentina) Catalina Pires | (China) Shilong Fan | 2025 |
| 56 | (Poland) Andrzei Grygier | (Russia) Igor Klokov | (Spain) Ausias Parejo | 2024 |
| 55 | (Japan) Io Yamada | (Spain) Ausias Parejo | (China) Mu Huaicong | 2023 |
| 54 | (Russia) Vera Danilina | (Spain) Ausias Parejo | (Poland) Katarzina Smolarek | 2022 |
| 53 | Not Awarded | (Japan) Yuki Saito | (Russia) Sergei Perelekhov | 2021 |
| 52 | Not Awarded | (Australia) Jess Flowers | (Hungary) Sidoo Zsombor | 2019 |
| 51 | (Serbia) Vojin Kocic | (Poland) Katarzyna Smolarek | (Poland) Daniel Egielman | 2018 |
| 50 | (Ukraine) Marko Topchii | (South Korea) Ji Hyung Park | (Italy) Giulia Ballarè | 2017 |
| 49 | Not Awarded | (Italy) Andrea De Vitis | (Ukraine) Marko Topchii | 2016 |
| 48 | (Russia) Rovshan Mamedkuliev | (Italy) Andrea De Vitis | (Poland) Daniel Egielman | 2015 |
| 47 | (Turkey) Eren Süalp | (Poland) Daniel Egielman | (Italy) Gian Marco Ciampa | 2014 |
| 46 | (Italy) Emanuele Buono | (Thailand) Ekachai Jearakul | (Russia) Anton Baranov | 2013 |
| 45 | (France) Lazhar Cherouana | (Thailand) Ekachai Jearakul | (Belarus) Pavel Kukhta | 2012 |
| 44 | (Mexico) Cecilio Perera | (South Korea) Kyuhee Park | (Venezuela) Jonathan Bolivar | 2011 |
| 43 | (Spain) Anabel Montesinos | (Croatia) Srdjan Bulat | (South Korea) Kyuhee Park | 2010 |
| 42 | (Hungary) András Csáki | (South Korea) Kyuhee Park | (France) Thomas Viloteau | 2009 |
| 41 | (Russia) Irina Kulikova | (Finland) Juuso Nieminen | (Croatia) Srdjan Bulat | 2008 |
| 40 | (Croatia) Petrit Ceku | (Russia) Dimitri Illarionov | (Russia) Irina Kulikova | 2007 |
| 39 | (Russia) Artyom Dervoed | (Spain) Anabel Montesinos | (Mexico) Pablo Garibay | 2006 |
| 38 | (Netherlands) Marlon Titre | (Hungary) András Csáki | (Spain) Anabel Montesinos | 2005 |
| 37 | (Italy) Adriano Del Sal | (Spain) Anabel Montesinos | Not Awarded | 2004 |
| 36 | (Italy) Flavio Sala | (Finland) Juuso Nieminen | (Chile) Antonio Escobar | 2003 |
| 35 | Not Awarded | (Italy) Christian Saggese | (Ukraine) Roman Viazovskiy | 2002 |
| 34 | (Poland) Marcin Dylla | (Ukraine) Roman Viazovskiy | (United Kingdom) Graham Anthony Devine | 2001 |
| 33 | (Federal Republic of Yugoslavia) Goran Krivokapić | (Italy) Giulio Tampalini | (Japan) Hajime Nakamura | 2000 |
| 32 | (Cuba) Marco Tamayo | (Federal Republic of Yugoslavia) Goran Krivokapić | (Croatia) Ana Vidović | 1999 |
| 31 | (France) Gaëlle Solal | Not Awarded | (United Kingdom) Mark Ashford (Italy) Massimo Felici | 1998 |
| 30 | (Italy) Lorenzo Micheli | (Poland) Marcin Dylla | (Japan) Reiko Sawada | 1997 |
| 29 | (Spain) Francisco Bernier | (Italy) Vincenzo Zecca | (Switzerland) Andre Fischer (Canada) Gordon O'Brien | 1996 |
| 28 | (Italy) Filomena Moretti | (China) Wang Yameng | (Italy) Sara Gianfelici | 1995 |
| 27 | (Italy) Federico Briasco | (Italy) Sante Tursi (Italy) Leopoldo Saracino | (Greece) Dimitrios Dimakopoulos (Germany) Franz Halasz | 1994 |
| 26 | (Japan) Daisuke Suzuki | (Italy) Salvatore Falcone | (Germany) Stefan Jenzer | 1993 |
| 25 | (Italy) Edoardo Catemario | (Italy) Monica Paolini | (Italy) Massimo Felici | 1992 |
| 24 | (Bulgaria) George Vassilev | (Italy) Paolo Bersano | (Venezuela) Angel Pedro | 1991 |
| 23 | Not Awarded | (Italy) Gianluca Di Cesare | (Hungary) Pal Paulikovic (Italy) Edoardo Marchese | 1990 |
| 22 | (Canada) Remi Boucher | (Italy) Stefano Raponi | (France) Francis Laurent | 1989 |
| 21 | (Brazil) Fábio Zanon | (Italy) Stefano Raponi | (Spain) María Esther Guzmán Blanco | 1988 |
| 20 | (Italy) Arturo Tallini | (Sweden) Per Skareng | (Italy) Roberto Lambo | 1987 |
| 19 | (Italy) Giuseppe Carrer (Italy) Massimo Laura | Not Awarded | (France) Guy Delhommeau (Italy) Francesco Sorti | 1986 |
| 18 | (Greece) Elena Papandreou | (Italy) Lucio Dosso | (Italy) Marco Carnicelli | 1985 |
| 17 | (Mexico) Rafael Jimenez Rojas | (Argentina) Edoardo Castanera | (Italy) Marco Carnicelli | 1984 |
| 16 | (Italy) Francesco Moccia | (Italy) Elena Casoli | (Cuba) Aldo Rodriguez Delgado | 1983 |
| 15 | Not Awarded | (Italy) Davide Ficco | (Spain) Gabriel Garcia-Santos | 1982 |
| 14 | (Italy) Leonardo De Angelis | (France) Frédéric Zigante | (France) Gilbert Clamens | 1981 |
| 13 | Not Awarded | (Italy) Stefano Cardi | (Italy) Stefano Viola | 1980 |
| 12 | (West Germany) Jurgen Schöllman | (Italy) Flavio Cucchi | (France) Roland Dyens | 1979 |
| 11 | (Italy) Stefano Grondona | (Italy) Claudio Passarotti | (Italy) Piero Bonaguri | 1978 |
| 10 | (Japan) Kazuhito Yamashita | (Italy) Domenico Salvati | (Japan) Ryuhei Kabayashi | 1977 |
| 9 | (Japan) Asamu Yamaguchi | (Finland) Jukka Savijoki | (Italy) Domenico Salvati | 1976 |
| 8 | Not Awarded | (Italy) Domenico Salvati | Not Awarded | 1975 |
| 7 | (United Kingdom) Cheryl Lesley Grice | (Greece) Constantin Cotsiolis | Not Awarded | 1974 |
| 6 | Not Awarded | (Greece) Constantin Cotsiolis | (Italy) Maurizio Colonna | 1973 |
| 5 | (Switzerland) Walter Feybli | (Spain) Andrés Martì | (Australia) John Clark | 1972 |
| 4 | (Argentina) Guillermo Fierens | (United States) Peter Segal | (Spain) Andrés Martì | 1971 |
| 3 | Not Awarded | (Italy) Giorgio Oltremari | (Spain) Miguel Barberà | 1970 |
| 2 | (Uruguay) Betho Davezac | Not Awarded | (Italy) Linda Calsolaro | 1969 |
| 1 | Not Awarded | (Austria) Leo Witoszynskyj | (Czechoslovakia) Alois Mensik | 1968 |

=== Jury ===
Source Official website

| Edition | President (H - Honorary, M - in memoriam) | Members | Secretary | Year |
|---|---|---|---|---|
| 50 | (Italy) Carlo Marchione | (Italy) Micaela Pittaluga, (China) Qing He, (Israel) Doron Salomon, (Spain) Guillem Pérez-Quer, (Germany) Franz Halasz, (Cuba) Marco Diaz Tamayo | (Italy) Marcello Pittaluga | 2017 |
| 49 | (United States) Ricardo Iznaola, H M (Venezuela) Alirio Díaz | (Italy) Micaela Pittaluga, (China) Xu Bao, (Paraguay) Berta Rojas, (Spain) Ignacio Rodes, (Belgium) Hugues Navez, (Italy) Luigi Attademo | (Italy) Marcello Pittaluga | 2016 |
| 48 | (Spain) Augustin Léon Ara, H (Venezuela) Alirio Díaz | (Italy) Micaela Pittaluga, (United Kingdom) Michael McMeeken, (France) Tania Chagnot, (Hungary) András Csáki, (Japan) Ichiro Suzuki, (Italy) Aniello Desiderio | (Italy) Marcello Pittaluga | 2015 |
| 47 | (Australia) Anna Reid, H (Venezuela) Alirio Díaz | (Italy) Micaela Pittaluga, (Spain) Francisco Bernier, (Spain) Guillem Pérez-Quer, (Germany) Kurt Hiesl, (Greece) Eleftheria Kotzia, (Italy) Massimo Delle Cese | (Italy) Marcello Pittaluga | 2014 |
| 46 | (Spain) Antón García Abril, H (Venezuela) Alirio Díaz | (Italy) Micaela Pittaluga, (United States) Michael Andriaccio, (United States) Joanne Castellani, (France) Bernard Maillot, (Uruguay) Eduardo Fernández, (Italy) Lorenzo Micheli | (Italy) Marcello Pittaluga | 2013 |
| 45 | (France) Frédéric Zigante, H (Venezuela) Alirio Díaz | (Italy) Micaela Pittaluga, (Norway) Stein-Erik Olsen, (United States) Thomas Heck, (France) Bernard Maillot, (Venezuela) Alfonso Montes, (Italy) Paolo Ferrara | (Italy) Marcello Pittaluga | 2012 |
| 44 | (United States) Laura Oltman, H (Venezuela) Alirio Díaz | (Italy) Micaela Pittaluga, (Canada) Norbert Kraft, (United States) Michael Newman, (Germany) Thomas Müller-Pering, (Japan) Shin-Ichi Fukuda, (Italy) Andrea Morricone, (Italy) Massimo Felici | (Italy) Marcello Pittaluga | 2011 |
| 43 | (Argentina) María Isabel Siewers, H (Venezuela) Alirio Díaz | (Italy) Micaela Pittaluga, (United Kingdom) Michael McMeeken, (United States) Martha Masters, (Hungary) József Eötvös, (Georgia (country)) Manana Doijashvili, (Italy) Aniello Desiderio | (Italy) Marcello Pittaluga | 2010 |
| 42 | (Spain) Alberto Ponce, H (Venezuela) Alirio Díaz | (Italy) Micaela Pittaluga, (Poland) Marcin Dylla, (France) Tania Chagnot, (Croatia) Darko Petrinjak, (Finland) Jukka Savijoki, (Italy) Elena Zaniboni | (Italy) Marcello Pittaluga | 2009 |
| 41 | (Sweden) Jakob Lindberg, H (Venezuela) Alirio Díaz | (Italy) Micaela Pittaluga, (Norway) Erik Stenstadvold, (United States) Joanne Castellani, (Brazil) Fábio Zanon, (France) Éric Pénicaud, (Italy) Lorenzo Micheli | (Italy) Marcello Pittaluga | 2008 |
| 40 | (Cuba) Antonio Biki Rodriguez, H (Venezuela) Alirio Díaz | (Italy) Micaela Pittaluga, (United Kingdom) Colin Cooper, (Israel) Matanya Ophee, (Lithuania) Sulamita Aronovsky, (Czech Republic) Pavel Steidl, (Cuba) Marco Diaz Tamayo, (Italy) Nuccio D'Angelo | (Italy) Marcello Pittaluga | 2007 |
| 39 | (United States) Marlaena Kessick, H (Venezuela) Alirio Díaz | (Italy) Micaela Pittaluga, (Canada) Norbert Kraft, (Croatia) Zoran Dukić, (Spain) Ricardo Gallén, (Venezuela) Jhibaro Rodríguez, (Italy) Leonardo De Angelis | (Italy) Marcello Pittaluga | 2006 |
| 38 | (Canada) Eli Kassner, H (Venezuela) Alirio Díaz | (Italy) Micaela Pittaluga, (Puerto Rico) Ernesto Cordero, (France) Danielle Ribouillault, (Argentina) Omar Cyrulnik, (Uruguay) Eduardo Fernández, (Japan) Ichiro Suzuki, (Italy) Oscar Ghiglia | (Italy) Marcello Pittaluga | 2005 |
| 37 | (Argentina) Ernesto Bitetti, H (Venezuela) Alirio Díaz | (Italy) Micaela Pittaluga, (Poland) Krzysztof Pełech, (United Kingdom) Carlos Bonell, (France) Olivier Chassain, (Greece) Evangelos Boudounis, (Italy) Carlo Marchione | (Italy) Marcello Pittaluga | 2004 |
| 36 | (Japan) Ichiro Suzuki, H (Venezuela) Alirio Díaz | (Italy) Micaela Pittaluga, (United States) Alice Artzt, (United States) David Tanenbaum, (Mexico) Corazón Otero, (Germany) Tilman Hoppstock, (Italy) Giuseppe Briasco, (Italy) Lucio Matarazzo | (Italy) Marcello Pittaluga | 2003 |
| 35 | (Spain) Alberto Ponce, H (Venezuela) Alirio Díaz | (Italy) Micaela Pittaluga, (Poland) Wanda Palacz, (Austria) Leo Witoszynskyj, (Brazil) Carlos Barbosa-Lima, (Uruguay) Eduardo Fernández, (Cuba) Marco Diaz Tamayo, (Italy) Paolo Pegoraro | (Italy) Marcello Pittaluga | 2002 |
| 34 | (Italy) Giorgio Vidusso, H (Venezuela) Alirio Díaz | (Italy) Micaela Pittaluga, (Canada) Rémi Boucher, (United States) Eliot Fisk, (Spain) Cecilia Rodrigo, (Czech Republic) Vladimír Mikulka, (Germany) Hubert Käppel, (Italy) Oscar Ghiglia | (Italy) Marcello Pittaluga | 2001 |
| 33 | (United States) Ron Purcell, H (Venezuela) Alirio Díaz | (Italy) Micaela Pittaluga, (Sweden) Magnus Andersson, (Italy) Angelo Gilardino, (Argentina) Roberto Aussel, (Germany) Sonja Prunnbauer, (Japan) Shin-Ichi Fukuda | (Italy) Marcello Pittaluga | 2000 |
| 32 | (Netherlands) Carel Harms, H (Venezuela) Alirio Díaz, M (France) Alexandre Lagoya | (Italy) Micaela Pittaluga, (Canada) Rémi Boucher, (United States) Penny Phillips, (Brazil) Marlos Nobre, (Belgium) Rafael Iturri, (Germany) Franz Halasz | (Italy) Marcello Pittaluga | 1999 |
| 31 | (Spain) Ignacio Yepes, H (Venezuela) Alirio Díaz | (Italy) Micaela Pittaluga, (United States) Dušan Bogdanović, (United States) Salvatore Cosentino, (Spain) Ismael Barambio, (Belgium) Godelieve Monden, (Italy) Oscar Ghiglia | (Italy) Marcello Pittaluga | 1998 |
| 30 | (Venezuela) Alirio Díaz | (Italy) Micaela Pittaluga, (Switzerland) Walter Feybli, (Italy) Arturo Tallini, (Chile) Eulogio Dávalos Llanos, (Greece) Elena Papandreou, (Germany) Peter Päffgen | (Italy) Marcello Pittaluga | 1997 |
| 29 | (Venezuela) Alirio Díaz | (Italy) Micaela Pittaluga, (China) Chen Zhi, (Italy) Federico Ermirio, (Argentina) Guillermo Fierens, (Uruguay) Betho Davezac, (France) Danielle Ribouillault | (Italy) Marcello Pittaluga | 1996 |
| 28 | (Venezuela) Alirio Díaz | (Italy) Guido Margaria, (United Kingdom) Colin Cooper, (Italy) Federico Ermirio, (Argentina) Alvaro Company, (Greece) Lena Kokkaliari, (France) Frédéric Zigante | (Italy) Marcello Pittaluga | 1995 |
| 27 | (Venezuela) Alirio Díaz | (Italy) Michele Pittaluga, (France) Robert J. Vidal, (Italy) Federico Ermirio, (Argentina) Guillermo Fierens, (Italy) Francesco Rizzoli, (France) Frédéric Zigante | (Italy) Alberto Scaglia | 1994 |
| 26 | (Venezuela) Alirio Díaz | (Italy) Michele Pittaluga, (France) Robert J. Vidal, (Italy) Federico Ermirio, (Argentina) Graciela Pomponio, (Greece) Gerassimos Miliaresis, (Italy) Carlo Ghersi | | 1993 |
| 25 | (Venezuela) Alirio Díaz | (Italy) Michele Pittaluga, (France) Robert J. Vidal, (Italy) Federico Ermirio, (Mexico) Corazón Otero, (Greece) Costas Cotsiolis, (Italy) Bruno Mattioli | | 1992 |
| 24 | (Venezuela) Alirio Díaz | (Italy) Michele Pittaluga, (France) Robert J. Vidal, (United States) Althers Garet, (Venezuela) Rodrigo Riera, (France) René Bartoli, (Italy) Gianluigi Fia | | 1991 |
| 23 | (Venezuela) Alirio Díaz | (Italy) Michele Pittaluga, (France) Robert J. Vidal, (Spain) Alberto Ponce, (Venezuela) Luiz Zea, (Puerto Rico) Ernesto Cordero, (Italy) Salvatore Pirrello | | 1990 |
| 22 | (Venezuela) Alirio Díaz | (Italy) Michele Pittaluga, (France) Robert J. Vidal, (Spain) Antonio Ruiz-Pipó, (Argentina) Guillermo Fierens, (Cuba) Leo Brouwer, (Italy) Mauro Storti, (Italy) Giuliano Balestra | | 1989 |
| 21 | (Venezuela) Alirio Díaz | (Italy) Michele Pittaluga, (France) Robert J. Vidal, (France) Henry Dorigny, (Argentina) Alvaro Company, (Japan) Ako Ito, (Italy) Leonardo De Angelis | | 1988 |
| 20 | (Venezuela) Alirio Díaz | (Italy) Michele Pittaluga, (France) Robert J. Vidal, (Venezuela) Inocente Carreño, (Argentina) Guillermo Fierens, (Brazil) Antonio Crivellaro, (Italy) Linda Calsolaro | | 1987 |
| 19 | (Venezuela) Alirio Díaz | (Italy) Michele Pittaluga, (France) Robert J. Vidal, (Spain) América Martínez Serrano, (Argentina) María Luisa Anido, (Netherlands) Frans Van de Ven, (Italy) Armando Marrosu | | 1986 |
| 18 | (Venezuela) Alirio Díaz | (Italy) Michele Pittaluga, (France) Robert J. Vidal, (Spain) Rocio Herrero, (Argentina) Alvaro Company, (Uruguay) Óscar Cáceres, (Italy) Carlo Palladino | | 1985 |
| 17 | (Venezuela) Alirio Díaz | (Italy) Michele Pittaluga, (France) Robert J. Vidal, (Mexico) Corazón Otero, (Socialist Federal Republic of Yugoslavia) Jovan Jovicich, (Brazil) Antonio Crivellaro, (Italy) Angelo Amato | | 1984 |
| 16 | (Venezuela) Alirio Díaz | (Italy) Michele Pittaluga, (France) Robert J. Vidal, (Mexico) Corazón Otero, (Belgium) Augustin Léon Ara, (Italy) Bruno Mattioli, (Italy) Ruggero Chiesa | (Italy) Guido Ottria | 1983 |
| 15 | (Venezuela) Alirio Díaz | (Italy) Michele Pittaluga, (France) Robert J. Vidal, (Italy) Aldo Minella, (Austria) Karl Scheit, (Poland) Alexandre Tansman, (Netherlands) Pieter van der Staak | (Italy) Guido Ottria | 1982 |
| 14 | (Venezuela) Alirio Díaz | (Italy) Michele Pittaluga, (France) Robert J. Vidal, (Italy) Carlo Mosso, (Venezuela) Antonio Lauro, (Brazil) Antonio Crivellaro, (United Kingdom) Gordon Crosskey | (Italy) Guido Ottria | 1981 |
| 13 | (Venezuela) Alirio Díaz | (Italy) Michele Pittaluga, (France) Robert J. Vidal, (Italy) Carlo Mosso, (Italy) Bruno Mattioli, (Uruguay) Betho Davezac, (Czechoslovakia) Barbara Polášek | (Italy) Guido Ottria | 1980 |
| 12 | (Venezuela) Alirio Díaz | (Italy) Michele Pittaluga, (France) Robert J. Vidal, (Italy) Carlo Mosso, (Italy) Mario Gangi, (Brazil) Antonio Crivellaro, (Brazil) Arminda Villa-Lobos | (Italy) Guido Ottria | 1979 |
| 11 | (Venezuela) Alirio Díaz | (Italy) Michele Pittaluga, (France) Robert J. Vidal, (Italy) Carlo Mosso, (Spain) Enrique Franco, (Italy) Hans Fazari, (Italy) Ruggero Chiesa | (Italy) Guido Ottria | 1978 |
| 10 | (Venezuela) Alirio Díaz, H (Spain) Joaquín Rodrigo | (Italy) Michele Pittaluga, (France) Robert J. Vidal, (Italy) Carlo Mosso, (Spain) José Tomás | (Italy) Guido Ottria | 1977 |
| 9 | (Venezuela) Alirio Díaz | (Italy) Michele Pittaluga, (France) Robert J. Vidal, (Italy) Felice Quaranta, (Spain) José Tomás, (Italy) Carlo Cammarota, (United Kingdom) John W. Duarte | (Italy) Guido Ottria | 1976 |
| 8 | (Venezuela) Alirio Díaz | (Italy) Michele Pittaluga, (France) Robert J. Vidal, (Italy) Felice Quaranta, (Spain) José Tomás, (Italy) Oscar Ghiglia, (Netherlands) Pieter van der Staak | (Italy) Guido Ottria | 1975 |
| 7 | (Venezuela) Alirio Díaz | (Italy) Michele Pittaluga, (France) Robert J. Vidal, (Italy) Felice Quaranta, (Spain) José Tomás, (Italy) Giacomo Saponaro, (United Kingdom) John W. Duarte, (Italy) Aldo Minella, (Italy) Guido Margaria | (Italy) Guido Ottria | 1974 |
| 6 | (Venezuela) Alirio Díaz | (Italy) Michele Pittaluga, (France) Robert J. Vidal, (Italy) Felice Quaranta, (Italy) Aldo Minella, (Italy) Giacomo Saponaro, (United Kingdom) John W. Duarte | (Italy) Guido Ottria | 1973 |
| 5 | (Venezuela) Alirio Díaz | (Italy) Michele Pittaluga, (France) Robert J. Vidal, (Italy) Felice Quaranta, (Italy) Aldo Minella, (Italy) Giacomo Saponaro | (Italy) Guido Ottria | 1972 |
| 4 | (Venezuela) Alirio Díaz | (Italy) Michele Pittaluga, (Italy) Giorgio Pestelli, (Italy) Felice Quaranta, (Italy) Aldo Minella, (Italy) Giacomo Saponaro, (Italy) Renato Cocito | (Italy) Guido Ottria | 1971 |
| 3 | (Venezuela) Alirio Díaz | (Italy) Michele Pittaluga, (Italy) Giorgio Pestelli, (Italy) Felice Quaranta, (Italy) Aldo Minella | (Italy) Guido Ottria | 1970 |
| 2 | (Venezuela) Alirio Díaz, H (Spain) Andrés Segovia | (Italy) Michele Pittaluga, (Italy) Giorgio Pestelli, (Italy) Piero Rattalino, (Italy) Aldo Minella, (Italy) Luigi Migliazzi, (Italy) Gigi Marsico | (Italy) Ennio Bassi | 1969 |
| 1 | (Venezuela) Alirio Díaz, H (Spain) Andrés Segovia | (Italy) Michele Pittaluga, (Italy) Luigi Migliazzi, (Italy) Piero Rattalino, (Italy) Aldo Minella | (Italy) Guido Margarita | 1968 |

== International Composition Competition for Classical Guitar "Michele Pittaluga" ==
=== Rules ===
- The International Jury consisting of at least five members of different nationalities with an established reputation in the music world.
- The first prize cannot be shared. In special cases, the International Jury may award remaining prizes equally.
- Each author shall be responsible for verifying the actual performability of the piece.
- Compositions entered for the contest must be unpublished and must never before have been performed in public.
- Composers of all nationalities and any age who have not won first prize in any of the previous editions are admitted to enter the competition.

=== Winners ===
| Edition | 1st prize | 2nd prize | 3rd prize | Year | Theme |
|---|---|---|---|---|---|
| 13 | (South Korea) Sung Hajin | Honor prizes : (France) Florent Aillaud (Italy) Stefano Marrosu | | 2024 | Guitar solo: a theme for the competition |
| 12 | (Russia) Konstantin Vassiliev | First Mention : (France) Florent Aillaud | Second mention : (Italy) Gabriele Caselli | 2020 | Guitar solo: a theme for the competition |
| 11 | Cat. A (Solo): (Italy) Marco De Biasi, Cat. B (Duo): (Belgium) Ganesh Del Vescovo | | | 2016 | Guitar solo or duo |
| 10 | (Venezuela) Luis Fernando Ochoa | | | 2012 | Guitar solo: a theme for the competition |
| 9 | (South Korea) Kang Kyung Mook | (Italy) Marco De Biasi, (Italy) Andrea Nosari | (Italy) Fabio Mengozzi | 2010 | Guitar with string quartet |
| 8 | (Italy) Franco Cavallone | Not Awarded | (France) Gilbert Clamens, (Israel) Tal Hurwitz | 2008 | Guitar duo or trio |
| 7 | (Japan) Takahiro Sakuma | (Italy) Maurizio Billi | Not Awarded | 2006 | Guitar with flute, harp or violin |
| 6 | (Chile) Javier Farias | (Italy) Marco Redaelli | (Israel) Johanan Chendler | 2004 | Guitar solo |
| 5 | (Italy) Marco Gammanossi | (Italy) Carla Rebora | (France) Éric Pénicaud | 2002 | Guitar trio |
| 4 | Not Awarded | (Italy) Davide Luini | (Italy) Massimo Ceccarelli | 2000 | Guitar and orchestra |
| 3 | Not Awarded | (Italy) Francisco Cavallone | (Japan) Naomi Sekiya | 1999 | Quartet with guitar or string quintet |
| 2 | (Italy) Paola Brino | (Netherlands) Annette Kruisbrink | (Japan) Naomi Sekiya | 1998 | Guitar duo, trio or quartet |
| 1 | (Italy) Alberto Colla | | | 1997 | Guitar solo |

=== Jury ===
| Edition | President (H - Honorarium) | Members | Year |
|---|---|---|---|
| 11 | (France) Frédéric Zigante | (United States) Ricardo Iznaola, (Italy) Simone Fontanelli, (Italy) Davide Anzaghi, (Spain) Gabriel Estarellas | 2016 |
| 10 | (Italy) Paolo Ferrara | (Cuba) Marco Diaz Tamayo, (Italy) Ana Gentile, (Argentina) Omar Cyrulnik, (Russia) Artyom Dervoed, (Spain) Francisco Bernier, (Spain) Anabel Montesinos | 2012 |
| 9 | (Spain) Antón García Abril | (Cuba) Marco Diaz Tamayo, (Italy) Giovanni Podera, (Italy) Gilberto Bosco, (Australia) Brian Finlayson, (Greece) Theodore Antoniou, (Brazil) Sérgio Assad | 2010 |
| 8 | (Cuba) Leo Brouwer | (Italy) Federico Ermirio, (Netherlands) Annette Kruisbrink, (France) Éric Pénicaud, (Italy) Davide Anzaghi, (Spain) Feliu Gasull, (Brazil) Jaime Mirtenbaum Zenamon | 2008 |
| 7 | (United States) Ricardo Iznaola | (Italy) Federico Ermirio, (France) André Jouve, (Uruguay) Miguel Patrón Marchand, (Italy) Paolo Castaldi, (Spain) Francisco Bernier, (Japan) Naomi Sekiya | 2006 |
| 6 | (Spain) Antón García Abril | (Italy) Federico Ermirio, (United States) Leonard V. Ball, (Greece) Costas Cotsiolis, (Romania) Walter Krafft, (Italy) Simone Fontanelli, (Bulgaria) Atanas Ourkouzounov | 2004 |
| 5 | (Italy) Vittorio Fellegara, H (Italy) Bruno Bettinelli | (Italy) Federico Ermirio, (United States) Robert Beaser, (Argentina) Guillermo Fierens, (Switzerland) Jean Balissat, (Italy) Giovanni Podera, (France) Anthony Girard, (Spain) Félix Ibarrondo | 2002 |
| 4 | (Italy) Bruno Bettinelli, H (Italy) Goffredo Petrassi | (Italy) Federico Ermirio, (United States) Robert W. Mann, (France) Roland Dyens, (Switzerland) Éric Gaudibert, (Italy) Giorgio Ferrari, (Hungary) Ivan Vandor | 2000 |
| 3 | (Italy) Luciano Chailly | (Italy) Federico Ermirio, (Belgium) Jacqueline Fontyn, (Argentina) Alvaro Company, (Switzerland) Carlo Florindo Semini, (Spain) Jesús Villa Rojo | 1999 |
| 2 | (Bulgaria) Victor Ciuckov | (Italy) Federico Ermirio, (United States) Dušan Bogdanović, (Argentina) Guillermo Fierens, (Italy) Angelo Gilardino, (France) Frédéric Zigante, (Spain) Antón García Abril | 1998 |
| 1 | (Italy) Luciano Chailly | (Italy) Federico Ermirio, (Venezuela) Alirio Díaz, (Puerto Rico) Ernesto Cordero, (Brazil) Marlos Nobre | 1997 |

== International Junior Talents Competition "Pittaluga Junior" ==
=== Rules ===
- The International Jury consisting of at least five members of different nationalities with an established reputation in the music world.
- Only the first prize is awarded.
- The competition consist of single round, opened to the public.
- All composition are performed from memory.
- Soloists of all nationalities are admitted to enter the competition, provided that they are less than 17 years old.
- 1st Prize winners of the past editions are not permitted to participate.

=== Winners, Jury and editions ===
| Edition | Winner | Jury President | Jury Members | Year |
|---|---|---|---|---|
| 3 | (China) Tiange Wang | (France) Gaëlle Solal | (Italy) Micaela Pittaluga, (Spain) Anabel Montesinos, (Russia) Irina Kulikova, (Mexico) Cecilio Perera, (Italy) Adriano Del Sal | 2017 |
| 2 | (Slovenia) Urbaan Reiter | (Spain) Cecilia Rodrigo | (Italy) Micaela Pittaluga, (United Kingdom) Michael McMeeken, (France) Isabelle Presti, (France) Tania Chagnot | 2015 |
| 1 | (Italy) Carlotta Dalia | (Italy) Angela Colombo | (Italy) Micaela Pittaluga, (Denmark) Marianne Granvig, (France) Frédéric Zigante, (Spain) Guillem Pérez-Quer | 2014 |

== See also ==
- List of classical music competitions
- Classical guitar
