= Artyom Dervoed =

Russian classical guitarist

Artyom Dervoed Russian: Артём Дервоед
- Born: October 25, 1981 (age 44); Rostov-on-Don, USSR
- Genre: Classical
- Occupation: Classical guitarist
- Instrument: Guitar
- Website: dervoed.com

Artyom Vladimirovich Dervoed (Russian: Артём Владимирович Дервоед; born October 25, 1981, Rostov-on-Don, USSR) is a Rusisan classical guitarist.

== Biography ==
Dervoed began his guitar studies at the age of six with Sergey Annikov, Elena Svetozarova and Leonid Reznik. He later trained with Prof. Nikolay Komolyatov at the Schnittke Music College and Gnesin Academy in Moscow, Aniello Desiderio at the Koblenz Guitar Academy in Germany, and Oscar Ghiglia at Accademia Chigiana in Italy.

Dervoed became the first Russian to win two of the most prestigious contests, the Michele Pittaluga International Classical Guitar Competition in Italy and Her Royal Highness Princess Cristina Competition in Spain. The international attention allowed him to focus on recording projects, including the album of new works by Russian composers, which was released worldwide on Naxos in 2008 and became one of the top ten bestselling chamber music records.

Dervoed has an active media profile in Russia. He is frequently invited to speak on TV and radio about the classical guitar, its historic significance, musical versatility and future. The recent world premiere of Stephen Goss’s Guitar Concerto based on Paganini’s Grand Sonata for Guitar and Violin, with Mikhail Pletnev and the Russian National Orchestra, was nationally televised.

Dervoed is the head of the classical guitar department at the Bashmet Center in Moscow and teaches a select group of young players at the prestigious Gnessin Academy as well as the Moscow State University of Culture & Arts. He is also the co-founder and Artistic Director of the annual Guitar Virtuosi Moscow International Festival, presented by the Moscow Philharmonic at the Tchaikovsky Hall. Its programs feature Sergio and Odair Assad, Boris Berezovsky and other international stars in solo, chamber and orchestral performances, including Russian and world premieres of new guitar repertoire, all of which are streamed online. Last year’s festival opened with Mr. Dervoed’s performance of his own transcription of Beethoven Violin Concerto with the Svetlanov State Symphony Orchestra under the baton of Fabio Mastrangelo.

=== Career ===
Dervoed has been an official D'Addario artist since 2005.

=== Awards ===
- 1995, Moscow (Russia), «Young Musicians» International competition — 1st prize;
- 1996, Belgorod (Russia), All-Russian competition — 1st prize;
- 1999, Carpentras (France), International competition dedicated to Leo Brouwer — 1st prize;
- 2004, Cherepovets (Russia), «Cup of North» International competition — 1st prize;
- 2004, Ile de Re (France), International competition — 1st prize;
- 2006, Alessandria (Italy), 39th Michele Pittaluga International Classical Guitar Competition — 1st prize;
- 2006, Singapore, International competition — 1st prize;
- 2007 “Golden Guitar” prize of the International Guitar Convention in Alessandria (Italy) in the Best Up-and-Coming Guitarist category;
- 2009, Toledo (Spain), «H.R.H. Princess Cristina» 18th International guitar competition – 1st prize.
- 2010, Buffalo (NY, USA), JoAnn Falletta International Guitar Concerto Competition – 1st prize.
- 2010, Boston (MA, USA), Boston GuitarFest International competition – 1st prize.
- 2010, Iserlohn (Germany), International guitar competition – 1st prize.
- 2011, Netanya (Israel), International guitar competition – 1st prize.
- 2012, Columbia (SC, USA), Southern Guitar Festival & Competition – 1st prize.
- 2012, Taipei (Taiwan), Taiwan International guitar competition – 1st prize.
- 2012, Pisa (Italy), «Stefano Strata – Città di Pisa» International competition – 1st prize.
- 2013, Moscow (Russia), Alexander Frauchi International competition – 1st prize.
- 2016, ICMA Best Solo Performance Award nomination in the “Solo Instruments” category

=== Select orchestral collaborations ===
Russian National Orchestra & Mikhail Pletnev, National Philharmonic Orchestra of Russia & Vladimir Spivakov, Svetlanov State Academic Symphony Orchestra, Pavel Kogan's Moscow State Symphony Orchestra, Yuri Bashmet's State Symphony Orchestra "Novaya Rossiya", Ural Philharmonic Orchestra, Tatarstan National Symphony Orchestra (Russia); Staatskapelle Berlin Orchestra, Rhine Philharmonic State Orchestra, Cologne New Philharmonic Orchestra, Sinfonietta Köln, Amadeus Kammerorchester Dortmund, Ensemble del Arte (Germany); Buffalo Philharmonic Orchestra (USA); Roma Philharmonic Orchestra, Vivaldi Philharmonic Orchestra (Italy); Beer-Sheva Simfonietta Orchestra (Israel).
