= Flavio Sala =

Italian classical guitar player (born 1983)

Flavio Sala (born May 9, 1983) is an Italian classical guitar player.

== Biography ==
After studying under the guidance of Pasqualino Garzia and obtaining his degree in classical guitar with an honorable mention in 2002, he studied with Oscar Ghiglia at the Academy Chigiana of Siena and at the Accademia Musicale in Florence.

Encouraged by the music of Alirio Diaz, Steve Howe and Paco de Lucia, he began his career at the age of 18, winning the XXVI International Competition of Guitar Interpretation of Gargnano (Brescia) and subsequently the XXXVI Michele Pittaluga International Classical Guitar Competition Alessandria, the Audience Vote at San Francisco International Master Guitar Competition (2004), the 1st prize at the XIV Concurso Internacional de Guitarra "Alirio Diaz" (2006), obtaining also the Special Prize Fundacion Vicente Emilio Sojo in Caracas, "a la mejor Interpretación de musica Venezolana" and 2 º prize at the VII Alexandre Tansman International Competition for Musical Personalities in Lodz (Poland, 2008), a competition for piano, violin, cello, flute, clarinet and guitar.

He has extensively toured and given master classes and workshops in Europe, Russia, the United States, South America, Cuba, in prestigious theaters and concert halls (Tchaikovsky Concert Hall and Gnessin's Hall of Moscow, Leopold Auer Hall, Bloomington, Alirio Diaz Theatre of Carora in Venezuela, Bonci Theatre in Cesena, Hall of the Conservatory of Vienna, Politeama Palermo, Theatre of the Hermitage Museum of St. Petersburg, Palace of the Legion of Honor in San Francisco), as soloist, in duo, trio, quartet, quintet and as soloist with orchestra (including the Turin Philharmonic Orchestra, Orchestra Milano Classica, Orchestra of St. Petersburg State Hermitage, the Moscow Philharmonic, New Russia Orchestra of Jury Bashmet, Spring Symphony Orchestra of Kazan, Yekaterinburg Big Symphony Orchestra, Orquesta Sinfonica de Venezuela, Minas Gerais Symphony Orchestra, etc...).

He has collaborated and performed with internationally renowned musicians in the classical field (Huascar Barradas, Hiwa Al Kabas, Daniel Binelli, Simon Sala ), Jazz (Marcus Miller, Toninho Horta, Cliff Almond, Alex Acuña, Otmaro Ruiz, Giovanni Baglioni, Peppino D'Agostino, Flavio Boltro, Cesar Orozco, Euro Zambrano), Flamenco (Carles Benavent, Jorge Pardo, Rubem Dantas, Israel El Piraña, Alain Perez Rodriguez) and pop (Mango, Rafael Pollo Brito).

He plays exclusively instruments made by Italian luthier Camillo Perrella.

== Discography ==
- 2005 – Flavio Sala Live at the Hermitage Theatre (Produced by Flavio Sala)
- 2008 – Encuentro (FelMay / Egea International)
- 2009 – Mi Alma Llanera – Music from Venezuela (Produced by Flavio Sala)
- 2010 – De La Buena Onda (Produced by Flavio Sala)
- 2011 – Flavio Sala plays POP (Produced by Flavio Sala)
- 2011 – Flavio Sala en vivo en Caracas (Produced by Flavio Sala)
- 2012 – I Maestri della Chitarra (With Italian guitar magazine SEICORDE N° 110 – January/March 2012. Produced by Flavio Sala)
- 2013 – Anthology of Music from Italy (With Italian Music Magazine SUONARE NEWS – #191 - Feb 2013. Produced by Flavio Sala)
- 2016 – Mi Guitarra y Mis Amores (Produced by Flavio Sala)

== Collaborations ==
- 2010 – Nine White Kites (Peppino D'Agostino)
- 2011 – La Terra degli Aquiloni (Sony - Mango)
- 2011 – Duende (Simone Sala)
- 2013 – Notes (Simone Sala)
