= Filomena Moretti =

Italian classical guitarist

Filomena Moretti (born 11 June 1973) is an Italian classical guitarist.

== Early life ==
Moretti was born in Sassari and graduated from the Sassari Conservatory, winning the first prize. After her graduation, she continued her studies with Ruggero Chiesa and won several international competitions:

- 1985–1987 Premier Prix and "Mention Spéciale" at the Competition Mondovi
- 1991 Premier Prix "Golfo degli Angeli" at the Competition Cagliari
- 1992 Second Prize "E. Pujol" at the International Competition of Sassari
- 1993 Premier Prix at the International Competition of Stresa; Second Prize at the Competition Fernando Sor in Rome
- 1995 Premier Prix et mention spéciale at the International Competition of Alessandria
- 1996 Premier Prix at the Competition de l'A.R.A.M.

In 1993, she obtained a grant to pursue her studies with Oscar Ghiglia at the Chiagana Academy in Siena.

== Performances ==
Moretti has played in Italy and throughout Europe. She has been invited by some musical institutions, such as:

- The Spiegelsaal im Museum für Kunst und Gewerbe in Hamburg
- The Gartensaal im Schloß Wolfsburg, the Zitadelle Spandau of Berlin, Kiel, the Chopin Foundation in Warsaw, Kraków, twice in a row, by the Società dei concerti of the Verdi Conservatoire in Milan
- The "Salone della Musica" in Turin
- The Musicora in Paris

She took part in several master-classes with Alirio Diaz, David Russell, Julian Bream, José Tomás and Manuel Barrueco.

Moretti also performed with leading orchestras. Her extensive repertoire includes the most important guitar concertos. She toured Italy in March 1999 with the renowned Lucero Tena (castanets). In June 1999, she performed the Giuliani Concerto with the Società dei Concerti at the Verdi Conservatory in Milan. In France, she has appeared at the TransClassiques at La Cigale in Paris, at the Flâneries Musicales in Reims, at the Festivals de Radio France in Montpellier, at the Young Soloist Festival in Antibes. Her concerts have been broadcast on Muzik and Mezzo TV channels. She has also been invited by the FRANCE 2 Channel.

== Recordings ==
Moretti has recorded two CDs, for Phoenix and Stradivarius. The release of the complete works for solo guitar by Joaquín Rodrigo on the Stradivarius label led to her being featured on the front page of the Italian magazine Classica. In 1998, she received the "Golden Guitar" for her recording of Fernando Sor under the Stradivarius label. She recorded two volumes of J.S. Bach's lute works transcribed for guitar for the Transart UK label.
