= List of compositions by Franco Donatoni =

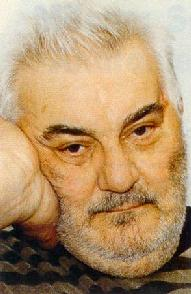
Franco Donatoni

This is a list of compositions by Franco Donatoni.

== The list ==
- Quartet No. 1, for string quartet (1950)
- Concerto for Orchestra (1951)
- Il libro dei Sette Sigilli, biblical cantata for soli, horn and orchestra (1951)
- Recitativo e allegro for violin and piano (1951)
- Concertino, for 2 horns, 2 trumpets, 2 trombones, 4 timpani and archi (1952)
- Concerto, for bassoon and orchestra (1952)
- Sonata, for viola solo (1952)
- Ouverture, for chamber orchestra (1953)
- Symphony, for string orchestra (1953)
- Cinque pezzi, for 2 pianos (1954)
- Divertimento, for violino e gruppo strumentale (1954)
- Musica, for chamber orchestra (1955)
- Composizione in quattro movimenti for piano (1955)
- La lampara, ballet (1957)
- Tre improvvisazioni for piano (1957)
- Quartet No. 2, for string quartet (1958)
- Movimento, for harpsichord, piano, and 9 instruments (1959)
- Serenata, for female voice and 16 instruments, text from Dylan Thomas (1959)
- Strophes, for orchestra (1959)
- For Grilly ("improvvisazione per sette" [improvisation for seven]), for 7 performers (1960)
- Sezioni ("Invenzione per orchestra" [inventions for orchestra]) (1960)
- Doubles, for harpsichord (1961)
- Puppenspiel I, ("Studi per una musica di scena" [studies for theatrical music]) for orchestra (1961)
- Quartet No. 3, for four-channel tape (1961)
- Per orchestra (1962)
- Quartet No. 4 (Zrcadlo), for string quartet (1963)
- Asar, for 10 string instruments (1964)
- Babai, for harpsichord (1964)
- Black and white, for 37 string instruments (1964)
- Divertimento No. 2, for strings (1965)
- Puppenspiel II, for flute and orchestra (1966)
- Etwas ruhiger im Ausdruck, for flute, clarinet, violin, violoncello, and piano (1967)
- Souvenir ("Kammersymphonie op. 18" [Chamber Symphony op. 18]), for 15 musical instruments (1967)
- Black and white II "Esercizi per le dieci dita" [Exercises for the Ten Fingers] for keyboard instruments (1968)
- Estratto for piano (1969)
- Orts ("Souvenir n. 2"), for 14 instruments and narrator ad libitum (1969)
- Solo, for string orchestra (1969)
- Doubles II, for orchestra (1970)
- To Earle, for chamber orchestra (1970)
- Secondo estratto, for harp, harpsichord, and piano (1970)
- To Earle Two, for orchestra and instruments (1971)
- Lied, for 13 instruments (1972)
- Jeux pour deux, for harpsichord and positive organ (1973)
- Voci–Orchesterübung, for orchestra (1973)
- Espressivo, for oboe and orchestra (1974)
- Quarto estratto, for 8 instruments (1974)
- Duetto, for harpsichord (1975)
- Duo pour Bruno, for orchestra (1975)
- Lumen, for 6 strumenti (1975)
- Terzo estratto, for piano and 8 instruments (1975)
- Ash, for 8 instruments (1976)
- Musette per Lothar, for musette (1976)
- Algo, for guitar (1977) (Written for Ruggero Chiesa and Oscar Ghiglia)
- Ali, 2 Pieces for viola solo (1977)
- Diario 76, for 4 trumpets and 4 trombones (1977)
- Portrait, for harpsichord and orchestra (1977)
- Spiri, for 10 instruments (1977)
- Toy, for 2 violins, viola, and harpsichord (1977)
- Arie, for female voice and orchestra, texts by Omar Khayyam, Renato Maestri, Fray Luis de León, Tiziana Fumagalli, Hafiz (1978)
- De Près, for female voice, 2 piccolos and 3 violins (1978)
- Ed insieme bussarono, for female voice and piano (1978)
- About..., for violin, viola, and guitar (1979)
- Argot, for violin (1979)
- Marches, for harp (1979)
- Nidi, for piccolo (1979)
- Clair, for clarinet (1980)
- L'ultima sera, for female voice and 5 instruments, text by Fernando Pessoa (1980)
- Le ruisseau sur l'escalier, for violoncello and 19 performers (1980)
- The Heart's Eye, for string quartet (1980)
- Fili, for flute and piano (1981)
- Small, for piccolo, clarinet, and harp (1981)
- Tema, for 12 instruments (1981)
- Feria, for 5 flutes, 5 trumpets an organ (1982)
- Lame, for violoncello (1982)
- In cauda (in three movements), for choir and orchestra (1982–1986),
- Abyss, for low female voice, bass flauto in C, and 10 instruments, text by Susan Park (1983),
- Ala, for violoncello and contrabass (1983),
- Alamari for violoncello, contrabass, and piano (1983),
- Diario '83 for 4 trumpets, 4 trombones, and orchestra (1983)
- Lem, for contrabass (1983)
- Rima, for piano (1983)
- She for 3 soprani and 6 instruments, text by Susan Park (1983)
- Symphony, op. 63 ("Anton Webern"), for chamber orchestra (1983)
- Françoise Variationen, for piano (1983–1996),
- Atem, opera in two movements and an intermezzo, text by Brandolino Brandolini d'Adda, Tiziana Fumagalli, Renato Maestri, and Susan Park (1984)
- Cadeau, for 11 performers (1984)
- Darkness for 6 percussionisti (1984)
- Ombra for contrabass clarinet (1984)
- Ronda for violino, viola, violoncello, and piano (1984)
- Omar for vibrafono (1985)
- Sextet, for 2 violins, 2 violas, and 2 violoncellos (1985)
- Still for soprano leggero e 6 strumenti (1985)
- Eco for orchestra da camera (1985–1986)
- Arpège, for 6 instruments (1986)
- Refrain, for 8 instruments (1986)
- Ave, for piccolo, glockenspiel, and celesta (1987)
- Flag, for 13 instruments (1987)
- O si ride for 12 solo voices, text by Brandolino Brandolini D'Adda (1987)
- A Françoise, for piano (1988)
- Cinis, for female voice and bass clarinet, testo di Gaio Licinio Calvo (1988)
- La souris sans sourire, for string quarteti (1988)
- Short, for trumpet in C (1988),
- Cloches, for 2 pianos, 8 wind instruments, and 2 percussionists (1988–1989)
- Blow, for wind quintet (1989)
- Ciglio for violin (1989)
- Frain, for 8 instruments (1989)
- Hot for sopranino or tenor saxophone and 6 performers (1989)
- Midi, for flute (1989)
- Soft, for bass clarinet (1989)
- Ase (Algo II), for female voice and guitar (1990)
- Bok, for bass clarinet and marimba (1990)
- Chantal, for solo harp, flute, clarinet, and string quartet (1990)
- Cloches II, for 2 pianos (1990)
- Het, for flute, bass clarinet, and piano (1990)
- Holly, for cor anglais, oboe, oboe d'amour, and 13 instruments (1990)
- Marches II for solo harp, 3 female voices ad libitum, 12 instruments, and 3 percussionists (1990)
- Rasch, for 4 saxophones (1990)
- Spice (Ronda n. 2) for violino/viola, clarinet in B♭/E♭ clarinet, violoncello, and piano (1990)
- Cloches III, for 2 pianos e 2 percussionisti (1991),
- Madrigale, for 4 choirs of white voices and 4 percussionists, text by Elsa Morante (1991)
- Refrain II, for 11 performers (1991)
- Aahiel, for mezzo-soprano, clarinet, vibraphone, marimba, and piano, anonymous text (1992)
- An Angel within my Heart for female voice, 2 clarinets, and string trio, text by Susan Park (1992)
- Concerto Grosso, for orchestra and 5 electronic keyboards (1992)
- Feria II, for organ (1992),
- Feria III, for organ (1992)
- Jay, for piano, 2 trumpets, 3 horns, and 2 trombones (1992)
- Late in the Day (Ronda n. 3), for soprano, flute, clarinet, and piano, text by Michael Riviere (1992)
- Mari for marimba (1992)
- Mari II for 4 marimbas (1992)
- Nidi II, for tenor recorder (1992)
- Scaglie, for trombone (1992)
- Sincronie, for piano with accompaniment of a solo violoncello (1992)
- Sweet, for tenor recorder (1992)
- Algo II, for 2 guitars (1993)
- Ciglio II, for violine and flute (1993)
- Concertino No. 2, for 5 electronic keyboards (1993)
- Refrain III, for 14 performers (1993)
- Small II, for flute, viola, and harp (1993)
- Sweet Basil, for trombone and big band (1993)
- In cauda II, for orchestra (1993–1994)
- Ciglio III, for violin and piano (1994)
- Flans, per coloratura soprano and 9 instruments, text by François Villon (1994)
- Portal, for clarinet in B♭, bass clarinet, E♭ clarinet, and orchestra (1994)
- Puppenspiel III for piccolo, flute, alto flute in G, and 14 performers (1994)
- Serenata II for 5 instruments (1994)
- Sincronie II for violoncello, piano, and 7 instruments (1994)
- Alfred, Alfred opera in seven scenes and six intermezzi, text by the composer (1995)
- Algo III for guitar and 23 performers (1995)
- Cinis II, for bass clarinet, marimba and percussion (1995),
- Duet No. 2, for 2 violins (1995)
- Fanfara, for brass (1995)
- Incisi, for oboe (1995)
- Luci, for flute in G (1995)
- Rasch II for 4 saxophones, vibraphone, marimba, percussion, and piano (1995)
- Triplum, for flute, oboe, and clarinet (1995)
- Algo IV for 13 instruments (1996)
- In cauda III, for orchestra (1996)
- Lame II, for 8 violoncellos (1996)
- Lem II, for contrabass and 15 instruments (1996)
- Luci II, for bassoon and horn (1996)
- Refrain IV, for 8 strumenti (1996)
- Till, for corno (1996)
- Leoncavallo, for piano (1996)
- Al, for mandolin, mandola, and guitar (1997)
- Che, for tuba (1997)
- Feria IV, for accordion (1997)
- Luci III, for string quartet (1997)
- Tell, for cor anglais (1997)
- Cerocchi 70 for clarinet, violoncello, and piano (1998)
- Elly, for clarinet, violoncello, and piano (1998)
- Fire (In cauda IV), for 4 female voices and orchestra, text by Jack Beeching (1998)
- Poll, for 13 performers (1998)
- Clair II, for clarinet (1999)
- Prom, for orchestra (1999)
- ESA (In cauda V), for orchestra (2000)
