= Ernesto Cordero =

Ernesto Cordero may refer to:

- Ernesto Cordero (musician) (born 1946), Puerto Rican composer and guitarist
- Ernesto Cordero Arroyo (born 1968), Mexican politician
