= Heike Matthiesen =

German classical guitarist (1964–2023)

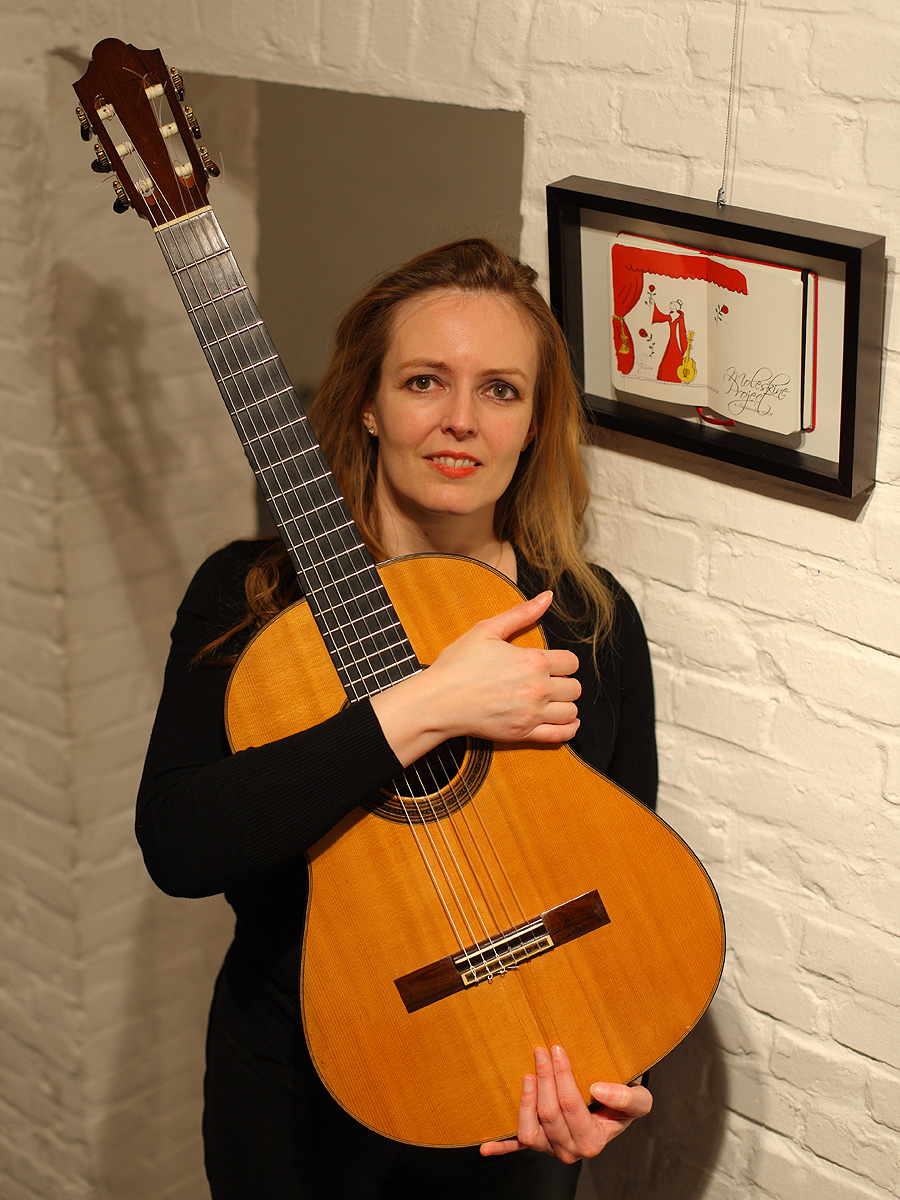
- Matthiesen in 2009
- Born: 27 June 1964; Braunschweig, Lower Saxony, West Germany
- Died: 22 December 2023 (aged 59)
- Occupation: Classical guitarist
- Website: heikematthiesen.com/en/home-2/

Heike Matthiesen (27 June 1964 – 22 December 2023) was a German classical guitarist who appeared internationally as a soloist and with ensembles. She promoted music by women composers and used social media for the distribution of classical music. Her 2016 solo album Guitar Ladies features works by women, written from the 19th to the 21st century, including a piece written for her and other first recordings.

== Life and career ==
=== Early life and education ===
Matthiesen was born in Braunschweig into a family of classical musicians; her father was a choral conductor and her mother a pianist. From early childhood, she enjoyed comprehensive musical training, playing the piano. Matthiesen took her first guitar lessons at the age of 18, and after one year she studied with Heinz Teuchert at the Musikhochschule Frankfurt. During her studies, she played in the Frankfurter Opern- und Museumsorchester.

Pepe Romero, who taught her for several years, was the formative influence on her playing. In addition, she attended master classes with Manuel Barrueco, David Russell, Roland Dyens, Alvaro Pierri and Leo Brouwer, among others.

=== Guitarist ===
Matthiesen worked as a soloist, and she also regularly performed with chamber music ensembles. From 1997 she was closely affiliated with Villa Musica in Mainz. In 1996, she replaced Pepe Romero in a Los Romeros concert, and she recorded a CD with the Spanish Art Guitar Quartet in 2005. Matthiesen performed in many countries, including the US, Russia, Japan, China, all around western Europe, Iceland, Bulgaria, Ethiopia, Pakistan, Nigeria, and Equatorial Guinea. She played at festivals and in guitar concert series, and was a juror in national and international competitions. Matthiesen was passionate about the music of women composers which she promoted. She was from 2017 a board member of the Internationaler Arbeitskreis Frau und Musik ( tr. "International Working Group Women and Music"), running the Archiv Frau und Musik (Archive Woman & Music) of compositions by women composers, and curated its guitar repertoire. She commissioned works by women, and played compositions by women from many centuries. She said in an interview:

In our loud chaotic world there is a strong need for calmness and awareness of the presence (also for silence) and what else can bring that better to the people than the fragile sound of a guitar?

Matthiesen was an early adopter of promoting classical music through evolving media formats.

=== Personal life ===
Matthiesen lived in Frankfurt. In August 2019 she was diagnosed with melanoma on the skin of her neck, and underwent surgery at the Universitätsklinikum Frankfurt.

Matthiesen died of cancer on 22 December 2023, at the age of 59.

== Guitars ==
- Gioachino Giussani 1990 "Alsuhail "
- Roy Fankhänel 2015 "RF160"

== Recordings ==
- Suite de los espejos (Mirror Suite), Andrei Volkonsky, portrait, Wergo 1993
- Bolero, with the Spanish Art Guitar Quartet, NCA 2005

Solo:

- Sol y luna, music from Spain and South America, Tyrolis 1998
- Tristemusette, music by Roland Dyens, Tyrolis 2001
- Serenade, phantasies and variations on 19th century opera, Vienna2day, 2013
- Guitar Ladies, music by women composers from all around the world, Vienna2day, October 2016
- Guitar Divas (2023)

Her 2016 solo album Guitar Ladies features exclusively compositions by women, Sidney Pratten (1821–1895), María Luisa Anido, Ida Presti, Sofia Gubaidulina, Sylvie Bodorová, Annette Kruisbrink, Carmen Guzman (1925–2012), Tatiana Stachak (born 1973) and Maria Linnemann, with Linnemann's work dedicated to her. A reviewer summarised:

Guitar Ladies by Heike Matthiesen is a wonderful collection of repertoire by prominent and historical composers. The all-women conceptual base ties the album together and, along with the works by Maria Linnemann dedicated to Matthiesen, represents an important repertoire exploration as well as a personal touch and contribution from the performer. With expressive and colourful performances, the album radiates a mood of melodic beauty, movement, and spaciousness rarely found all in one place.
