= Maria Linnemann =

Classical composer (b. 1947)

- Born: 1947 (age 77–78); Amsterdam, Netherlands
- Occupation: Classical composer
- Website: www.maria-linnemann.de

Maria Catharina Linnemann (born 1947) is a British composer and music teacher, based in Germany, who wrote mainly music for classical guitar including pieces for beginners.

== Life and career ==
Linnemann was born in Amsterdam but grew up in England. She studied piano, violin, and conducting at the Royal Academy of Music in London from 1966 to 1970. She moved to Germany in 1971, working as a music teacher. Among her compositions are musicals for children and music for puppet theatres. Her main publisher is Casa Ricordi.

== Recordings ==
One of her compositions for guitar was recorded by Heike Matthiesen in 2016. Her solo album Guitar Ladies includes exclusively compositions by women: Sidney Pratten (1821–1895), María Luisa Anido, Ida Presti, Sofia Gubaidulina, Sylvie Bodorová, Annette Kruisbrink, Carmen Guzman (1925–2012), Tatiana Stachak (born 1973) and work by Linnemann herself. A reviewer said:

Guitar Ladies by Heike Matthiesen is a wonderful collection of repertoire by prominent and historical composers. The all-women conceptual base ties the album together and, along with the works by Maria Linnemann dedicated to Matthiesen, represents an important repertoire exploration as well as a personal touch and contribution from the performer.
