= Irina Kulikova (guitarist) =

Russian musician (born 1982)

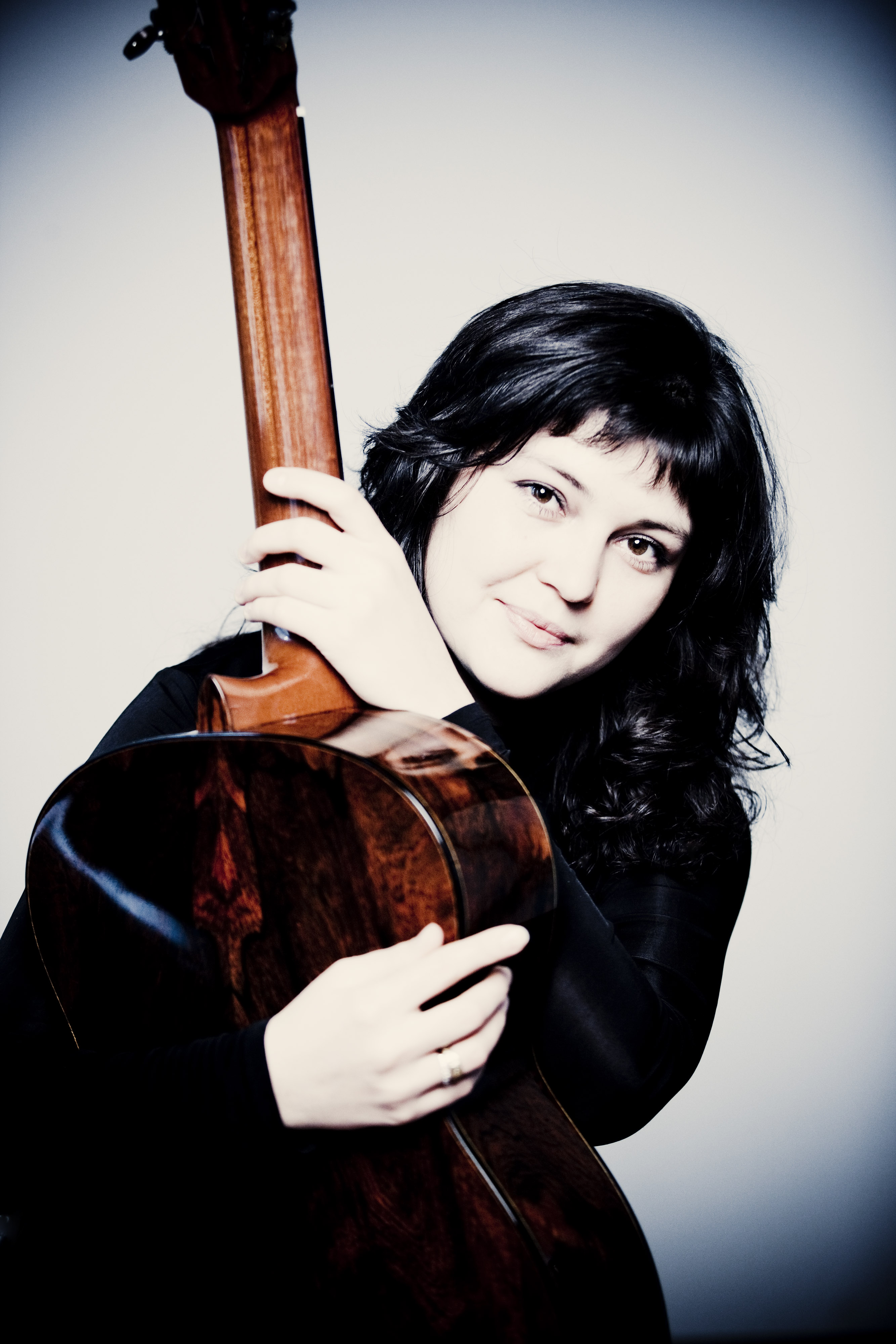
- Irina Kulikova, 2009

Background information
- Born: 30 April 1982 (age 42); Chelyabinsk
- Genres: Classical music
- Occupation: Guitarist
- Instrument: Guitar
- Years active: 1994 - present
- Labels: Naxos
- Website: www.irinakulikova.com

Irina Kulikova (born 30 April 1982) is a Russian classical guitarist.

== Biography ==
Irina Kulikova was born in Chelyabinsk, the capital of Chelyabinsk Oblast, Russia. Under the guidance of Victor Kozlov and her mother – cellist Vinera Kulikova – she started developing her musicianship from the earliest age. At the age of twelve, she was already travelling around Russia and abroad for gala-concerts and festivals. When she reached fourteen, she was included in the book 'The Classical Guitar, its evolution, players and personalities since 1800' by Maurice Summerfield.

Kulikova has given concerts all over Europe, Russia, and in North-America, performing as a soloist, in a variety of ensembles and with a number of orchestras. She played at leading guitar festivals all over the world and in beautiful halls like the Concertgebouw in Amsterdam, the Tchaikovsky Hall in Moscow, the Academic Capella in St. Petersburg and the Schloss Mirabel in Salzburg. She performed for various members of the royal and aristocratic families of Germany and Denmark.

The experts’ appreciation of her interpretations is underlined by numerous awards on prestigious international guitar competitions, culminating with five 1st prizes in 2008: Michele Pittaluga in Italy, Guitarra Alhambra in Spain, Forum Gitarre Wien in Austria, the International Guitar competition Iserlohn in Germany and the 'Twents Gitaarfestival' in the Netherlands, 2008. In the same year, she was awarded the Young talent, Culture and Podium prize in the Netherlands.

Irina Kulikova graduated with distinction at the Mozarteum University in Salzburg (Austria), the Gnessins Academy in Moscow (Russia) and the Conservatoire of Maastricht (The Netherlands). She studied with outstanding musicians like Marco Tamayo, Carlo Marchione, Simone Fontanelli (modern music), Howard Penny (baroque music) and Hans Brüderl (baroque lute).

Since 2007, Irina Kulikova lives and teaches in the Netherlands.

== Discography ==
In 2005, Irina Kulikova recorded her first solo CD, with works of Legnani, Mertz, Barríos Mangoré, Sor, Moreno-Torroba, Aguado and Rodrigo. In 2009, she released her second solo CD, in the Laureate Series of Naxos (as winner of the Michele Pittaluga competition in 2008), with works by Ponce, Tansman, Brouwer and José María Gallardo Del Rey.

In 2011, her third solo CD was released. It is the first CD in the Laureate series of Naxos for winners of the Alhambra Competition in Spain.

== Awards ==
Irina Kulikova started winning first prizes on international competitions in Russia at the age of twelve.

Awards since 2006:

First prizes

- Michele Pittaluga International Classical Guitar Competition, Alessandria, Italy, 2008
- Guitarra Alhambra, Valencia, Spain, 2008
- Forum Gitarre Wien, Austria, 2008
- International Guitar competition Iserlohn, Germany, 2008
- Twents Gitaarfestival, The Netherlands, 2008
- International Guitar festival of Coria, Spain, 2006

Second prizes

- International Guitar festival of Naxos, Greece, 2007
- Norba Caesarina, Cáceres, Spain, 2007
- Ivor Mairants Guitar Award, London, England, 2006

Other awards

- Young talent, Culture and Podium prize, The Netherlands, 2008
- Printemps de la Guitare, Charleroi, Belgium, 2006
- Special Prize, Koblenz International Guitar Festival, 2006
