= Lucio Matarazzo =

Italian guitarist

Lucio Matarazzo is an Italian classical guitarist. Along with successful guitarists Julian Bream, Alirio Diaz and Alexandre Lagoya, he is a recipient of the prestigious Chitarra d'Oro (Golden Guitar) in the category of Una Vita per la Chitarra (A Life for the Guitar) awarded by the International Guitar Convention of Alessandria.

== Career ==
He was a founding member of the GuitArt Quartet (GQ), which achieved International recognition in 2001, when Leo Brouwer dedicated his Concierto Italico to them, becoming the first Italians to whom the composer dedicated one of his concerti. So the GuitArt Quartet joins the ranks of other great musicians, such as Julian Bream, Sharon Isbin and John Williams, for whom Brouwer has composed important works. The Concierto Italico première was held in the Todi International Festival with Leo Brouwer as conductor. The GuitArt Quartet also gave the world premieres of Angelo Gilardino's Concerto Italiano for four guitars and orchestra in 1999, Gerard Drozd's Concerto Rapsodico op.80 for four guitars and orchestra, at the 2001 Lublin International Festival. In 2002 the English magazine Classical Guitar dedicated their front cover and an extensive interview by Colin Cooper, and Maurice Summerfield included this ensemble in the prestigious publication “The Classical Guitar”, that chronicles all of the most important guitar artists since 1800.

For more than twenty years Lucio was performing in duo with the guitarist Mario Fragnito. The duo won, among others, the International Competition of Stresa, Palmi, Forte dei Marmi, Trapani and Berlin. In duo with M. Fragnito, Lucio recorded 2 LP's and 5 CD's for Lira Records, Ducale and Edi-Pan editions. The duo performed concerts in Europe including numerous world premières, such as Castelnuovo-Tedesco's 24 Preludes and Fugues (whose new 4 volume edition is presently being completed for Berben).

His collaboration with Ut Orpheus Edizioni led to the highly successful Lucio Matarazzo Collection which consists of studies and educational works by past masters of the guitar including Mauro Giuliani, Anton Diabelli, Fernando Sor, Agustin Barrios, Dionisio Aguado, Niccolò Paganini, J.K. Mertz, and many more. He also has released numerous records, including recordings of studies by Carcassi, Giuliani, Legnani and Brouwer.
