= Eliot Fisk =

- Eliot Fisk with his mentor Andrés Segovia

Background information
- Born: August 10, 1954 (age 72); Philadelphia, Pennsylvania, U.S.
- Genre: Classical
- Occupations: Musician, teacher
- Instrument: Classical guitar
- Years active: 1976–present
- Labels: Musical Heritage Society, MusicMasters, Naxos, Albany, Nimbus, Wildner
- Website: EliotFisk.com

Eliot Hamilton Fisk (born August 10, 1954) is an American classical guitarist.

== Musical career ==
=== Education and teaching ===
Eliot Fisk was born into a Quaker family in Philadelphia. Primarily self-taught he started playing guitar at age 7 and briefly studied with William Viola at age 12 before his family moved to New York where he was 14. In 1970 Fisk won a full scholarship to the Aspen Music School where he studied Oscar Ghiglia and in that same year received a grant to study with Alirio Díaz at the Banff School of Fine Arts. Later in 1973 Rose Augustine introduced Fisk to Andrés Segovia who provide Fisk with private instruction when he visited New York.

Upon finishing high school in DeWitt, New York, Fisk studied music at Yale University with harpsichordists Ralph Kirkpatrick and Albert Fuller as Yale had yet to create a guitar program. Fisk received both B.A. and M.S. degrees from Yale and in 1977 started Yale's guitar department. Fisk later left Yale in 1980 after taking a job at Hochschule fur Musik in Germany and appointed Ben Verdery as his successor at Yale who later created "The Eliot Fisk Prize" in his honor. Later 1989 Fisk became an instructor at the Mozarteum University of Salzburg in Austria and in 1996 at the New England Conservatory of Music in Boston. He created the Boston GuitarFest and is its artistic director.

=== Performing and recording ===
Fisk started his performing career as a solo guitarist and chamber musician in New York in 1970s with the financial backing of Rose Agustin. In the 1980s he started recording for Musical Heritage Society as a solo guitarist recording Bach, Barrios and Scarlatti. He had early chamber music experience with soprano Victoria de los Ángelesand later performed with the Juilliard String Quartet, Miró Quartet, Chilingirian Quartet, and Shanghai Quartet. He has also performed with orchestras around the world, including Orchestra of St. Luke's, Stuttgart Chamber Orchestra, Los Angeles Philharmonic, Houston Symphony, American Composers Orchestra, and the Pro Arte Orchestra. In chamber music settings, He has performed and recorded with flautist Paula Robison; violinist Ruggiero Ricci, jazz guitarists Joe Pass and Bill Frisell, flamenco guitarist Paco Peña, and singer Ute Lemper. With flutist Paula Robison, he recorded Robert Beaser's Mountain Songs, which was nominated for a Grammy Award in 1987. He collaborated with Ernesto Halffter, at the request of Segovia, on Halffter's Concierto for Guitar and Orchestra, which was performed with the Spanish National Orchestra and then turned into an album.

In the 1990s, Segovia's widow gave Fisk unpublished compositions by Segovia. Fisk turned these compositions into Segovia: Canciones Populares, which became a bestseller on the Classical Album chart of Billboard magazine. His transcription of violinist Niccolò Paganini's 24 Caprices also entered the chart and was widely praised.

=== Transcriptions and commissions ===
Fisk has increased the amount of material available to classical guitarists by transcribing music written for other instruments. This increased repertoire includes his transcriptions of Bach, Scarlatti, Froberger, Paganini, Mendelssohn, Mozart, Haydn and Schubert.

He has also expanded the body of music for classical guitar by commissioning new pieces from composers, such as Leonardo Balada, Robert Beaser, Luciano Berio, William Bolcom, Nicholas Maw, Xavier Montsalvatge, George Rochberg, and Kurt Schwertsik.

The volume and impact of his transcriptions, as well as of his teaching, has led him to be called "the Liszt of the guitar."

Controversial Views

Eliot Fisk plays in a style that is exciting for many but outside of the normal standards of classical music practice which has caused his much criticism. He has defended his style by denigrating other classical guitarists as being too safe.

Fisk has also had controversial statements regarding how he felt slighted by his contemporaries as he was starting his career. He states "My rebellion is in truth against Bream and Williams; because I have to confess I'm a bit disappointed in both of them. From time immemorial, it has been the practice of one generation to pass on to the next what it learned. But my generation has almost no guitar fathers. Ghiglia and Diaz taught and were accessible, but Bream and Williams were not. [...] They've both given immensely. But growing up, I was very saddened by their inaccessibility. I feel that my generation lost a lot because of that. In a way, we all need to rebel. The next generation will rebel against us. It's one thing I encourage when teaching. I want to give my students the strength to tell me to go to hell. 'Cause if they can tell me to go to hell, they can tell the world. Ultimately, that will help them, not to be difficult but rather to have conviction for the long struggle."

Fisk has also defended Andres Segovia from detractors. "It's true that Segovia didn't get compositions from Bartók, Stravinsky, Prokofiev and a lot of composers we would like to have pieces from. Maybe he was in a position to have done that, but on the other hand, who among us has done as much as he did? If other people were interested, they could've tried to commission them. Besides, this criticism of Segovia is pointless. If you disagree with what Segovia did, take that energy and go out and do something positive. Otherwise, shut up." "Now, it's different when John Williams, who studied with Segovia, says he wasn't a good teacher and the like. There is a difference in generation. [...] I didn't have Segovia butting into my life, telling me to do this and that. That's why John needed to rebel violently."

=== Awards and honors ===
- First place, International Guitar Competition, Gargnano, Italy (1980)
- Grammy Award nomination, Mountain Songs (1987)
- Best Classical Guitarist, Guitar Player magazine Readers Poll (1994)
- Grand Cross of Isabel la Cátolica, for contribution to Spanish music (2006)
- Teacher of the Year, New England Conservatory (2010)
- GFA Artistic Achievement Award (2022)

== Discography ==
Year	Album	Label
1981	Eliot Fisk: Guitar Virtuoso	Musical Heritage Society
1981	Latin American Guitar	MusicMasters
1986	Eliot Fisk Performs Works by Baroque Composers	MusicMasters
1989	Eliot Fisk Performs Baroque Guitar Transcriptions	Musical Heritage Society
1991	Eliot Fisk Plays Guitar Fantasies	MusicMasters
1991	Bell'Italia: Four Centuries of Italian Music	MusicMasters
1993	Paganini: 24 Caprices	MusicMasters
1993	Vivaldi Concertos & Other Works	MusicMasters
1994	Mountain Songs: A Cycle of American Folk Music with Paula Robison	MusicMasters
1994	Rochberg:Caprice Variations	MusicMasters
1995	Sequenza!	MusicMasters
1995	The Best of Eliot Fisk	MusicMasters
1995	Eliot Fisk: Für Eliot	GSP
1996	Segovia: Canciones Populares	Musical Heritage Society
1998	Bach: The Trio Sonatas	MusicMasters
1999	Canciones Latinas	Musical Heritage Society
2000	George Rochberg: Eden: Out of Time & Out of Space	Arabesque
2001	Concert Music for Guitar and Mandolin Orchestra, Vol. 2	MDG
2001	Bach: The Sonatas & Partitas for Solo Violin	Musical Heritage Society
2002	The Artistry of Eliot Fisk	Musical Heritage Society
2003	Scarlatti: 18 Sonatas	Vgo
2004	Castelnuevo-Tedesco: Guitar Concerto No. 1; Guitar Quintet; Other Works	Musical Heritage Society
2005	Françaix, Ponce, Rodrigo: Guitar Concertos	Essay
2006	Ernesto Halffter: Sinfonietta; Guitar Concerto	Essay
2009	Eliot Fisk Performs His Own Guitar Transcription of Works by Baroque Composers	Musical Heritage Society
2010	A Tribute to Andrés Segovia	Nimbus
2010	The Red Guitar	Wildner
2010	Ein kleines Requiem	Wildner
2014	Paco Peña & Eliot Fisk in Duo Recital	Nimbus
2014	Songs Without Words: From Bach to Bachianas	Albany
2015	Ralf Yusuf Gawlick: Kollwitz-Konnex, Song Cycle for Soprano & Guitar	Musica Omnia
