= András Csáki =

Hungarian musician (born 1981)

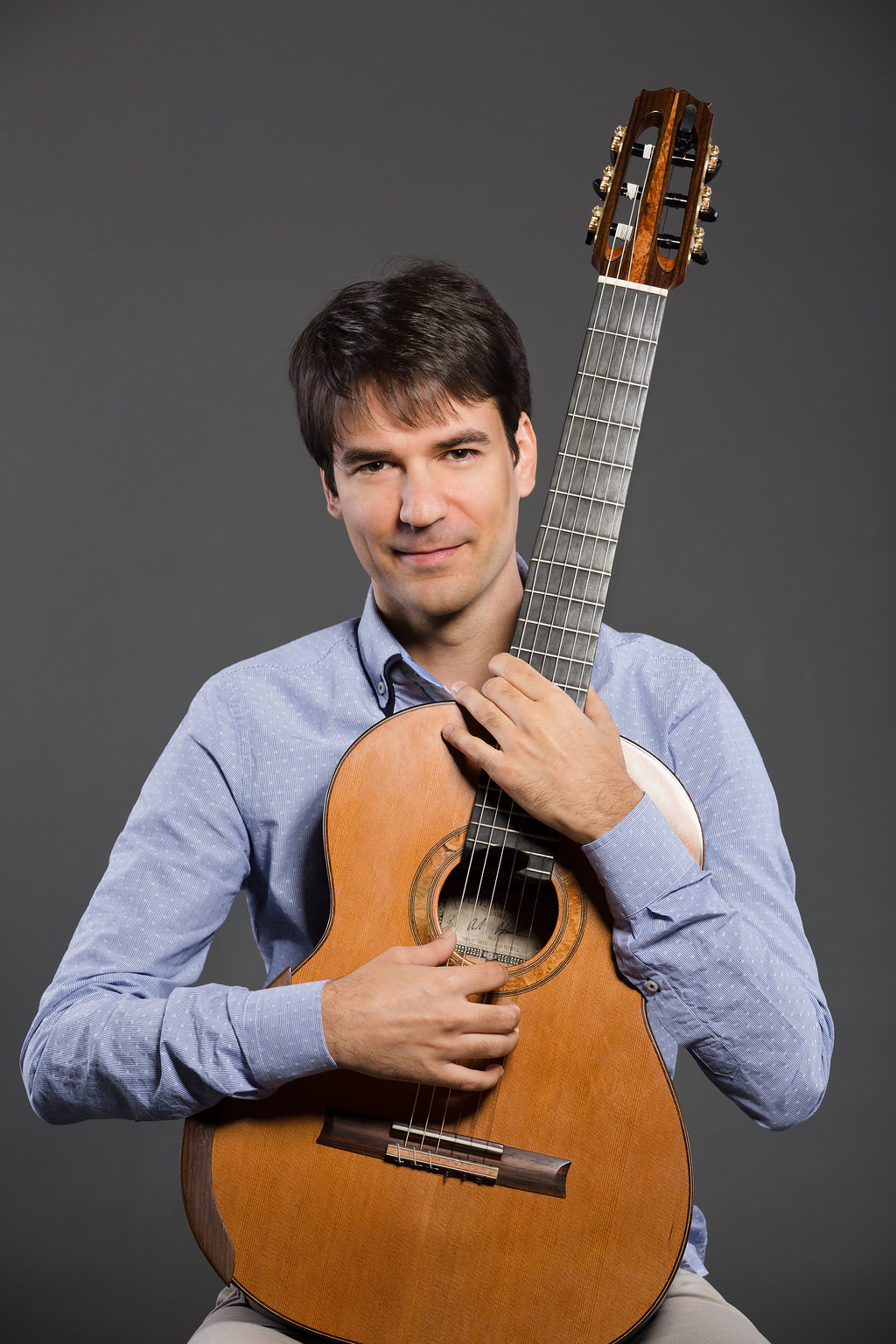
Andras Csaki guitarist, Hungary, Budapest

András Csáki (born 1981 in Budapest), is a musician and guitarist from Hungary.

== Life and career ==
He began to play the guitar at the age of 11. He graduated at the Liszt Ferenc Academy of Music with honor in 2007, where his professor was József Eötvös. In 2012–2013 he pursued graduate studies in the University of Southern California as a student of Scott Tennant. He received his Doctorate degree in 2014 at the Liszt Ferenc Academy of Music.

Since 1995 András has been a regular participant of international master classes all over the world, including master classes held by Manuel Barrueco, Leo Brouwer, Abel Carlevaro, Costas Cotsiolis, David Russell, Angel and Pepe Romero.

Until the year of 2011 he received 24 prizes, among others he was awarded the first prize in the 51st Tokyo International Guitar Competition in 2008, and in the 42nd Michele Pittaluga International Classical Guitar Competition in Alessandria, Italy 2009, Julian Arcas Guitar Competition, Spain 2011.

Besides solo recitals, he is also devoted to chamber music. He has had several opportunities to play guitar concertos with symphonic orchestras in Hungary and abroad.

He has frequently been asked to give master classes in various countries, such as China, Estonia, France, Greece, India, Romania, Russia, the United Kingdom, the United States and his native Hungary. In 2009 he was appointed assistant professor at Liszt Ferenc Academy of Music in Budapest.
