= Gian Marco Ciampa =

Italian classical guitarist (born 1990)

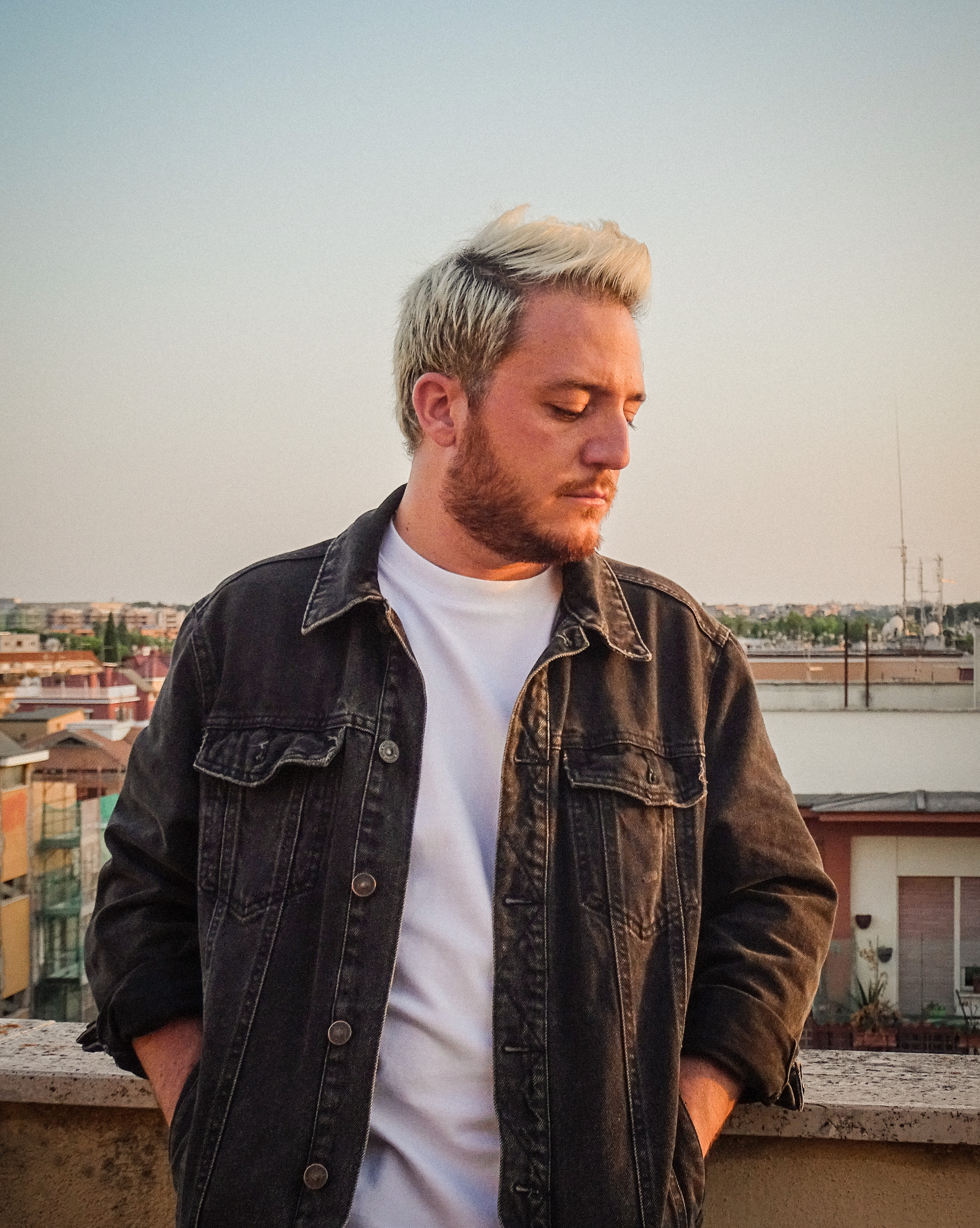

Background information
- Born: 29 May 1990 (age 36); Rome, Italy
- Genres: Classical music, indie pop, pop music
- Instruments: Classical guitar, electric guitar
- Years active: 2006–present
- Website: gianmarcociampa.com

Gian Marco Ciampa (born 29 May 1990) is an Italian classical and electric guitarist.

== Biography ==
=== Early life ===
Gian Marco Ciampa was born in Rome in 1990. He started playing classical guitar at the age of 10, inspired by his older brother. He was quickly acclaimed a prodigy by the critics. In 2006 he made an appearance in a TV programme Domenica In – Ieri, oggi e domani on the Rai 1 channel. His first guitar teachers were Fernando Lepri and Fabrizio Verile.

=== Education ===
During his formation period, Ciampa studied with numerous guitar teachers, including Arturo Tallini, Paolo Pegoraro, Oscar Ghiglia, Adriano del Sal, and Bruno Battisti D'Amario. He graduated from Conservatorio Santa Cecilia in Rome, and attended lessons at the Chigiana Musical Academy and Segovia Guitar Academy.

=== Career ===
In the course of his career, Ciampa has been awarded over 40 international and national prizes in classical guitar competitions. He has performed concerts and offered masterclasses in many European countries, as well as in Australia, China, Japan, Argentina, and the USA. In 2016 he gave a TEDxTalk entitled 'Who says classical music is only for old people?'. In 2017 he released an EP called RÍO with works by Heitor Villa-Lobos, Manuel Maria Ponce, and Agustín Barrios. He collaborates with cellist Erica Picotti and flutist Bianca Fiorito. He is an ambassador of Savarez strings and guitar support GuitarLift. Since 2020 he has been the guitarist of Teatro del Maggio Musicale Fiorentino in Florence.

=== Popular music ===
Ciampa is active in the field of popular music, and has so far collaborated with various Italian singers and songwriters, such as Coez, Aiello, Margherita Vicario, Francesa Michielin, Gemello, and Mogol. In 2016 together with Margherita Vicario and Roberto Angelini, he created a project called 'Leggermente Classica' – a live show, which combined classical and popular music. In 2020 he performed live with Aiello in the Parco della Musica auditorium in Rome as a part of the Concerto del Primo Maggio festival. He initiated a project called MusicLab, that aims to teach children appreciation of music through meetings with popular singers at the Bambino Gesù Children's Hospital.

== Awards ==
- 2013: Premio Mercatali at International Guitar Competition in Gorizia
- 2014: Premio Chitarra d'Oro "Giovane Promessa"
- 2018: 1st Prize in the Melbourne Guitar Festival International Concert Artist Competition
- 2020: 1st Prize in Concurso Internacional de Guitarra Culiacán
- 2022: Premio LAZIOSound in duo with Erica Picotti

== Discography ==
=== Extended plays ===
- RÍO. Independent release, 2016.
- RÍO deluxe. DotGuitar/CD – The LM Project, 2020.
- NUNA, Pop Up Records, 2026

=== Singles ===
- Isaac Albéniz: Mallorca, Op. 202 (with Erica Picotti, cello). INRI Classic, 2022.
- Enrique Granados: Danzas españolas, No. 5. Andaluza (with Erica Picotti, cello). INRI Classic, 2022.
- Manuel de Falla: Siete canciones populares españolas, No. 3. Asturiana (with Erica Picotti, cello). INRI Classic, 2022.
- Astor Piazzolla: Adiós Nonino (with Erica Picotti, cello). LAZIOSound/INRI Classic, 2023.
- Astor Piazzolla: Escualo (with Erica Picotti, cello). LAZIOSound/INRI Classic, 2023.
