= Kyuhee Park =

South Korean musical artist

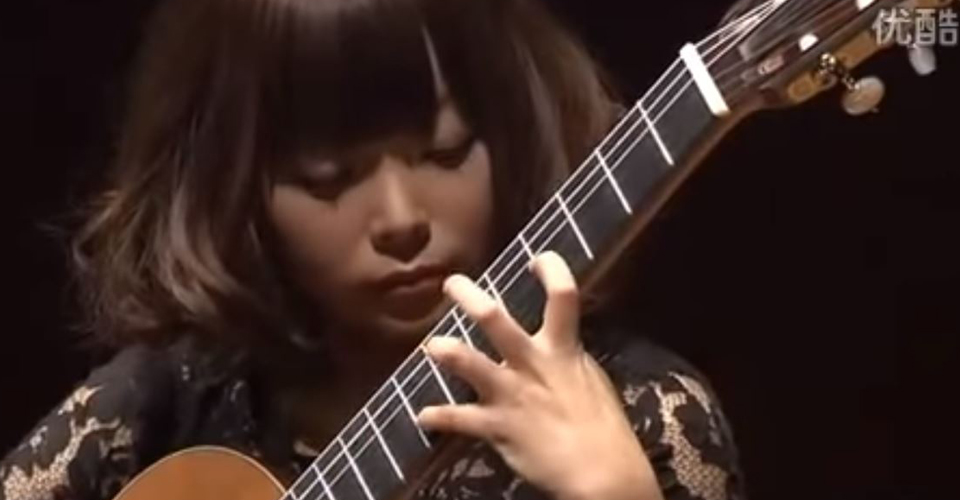

Background information
- Born: 1985 (age 40–41); Incheon, South Korea
- Genre: Classical
- Occupation: Instrumentalist (guitar)
- Instrument: Classical guitar

Kyuhee Park (born in 16th September 1985) is a classical guitarist who was born in Incheon, South Korea and raised in South Korea and Japan.

== Biography ==
Park began her guitar studies at age three in Incheon, South Korea. At age nine, she won first prize in the Youth Division of the National Korean Guitar Competition, followed by a string of first prizes in national and international competitions. She moved back to Japan at age fifteen. She enrolled in the Tokyo College of Music in 2004 and studied with Japanese classical guitarists Shin-Ichi Fukuda and Kiyoshi Shomura and later with Álvaro Pierri at the Vienna Music University. She has participated in opera tours conducted by Seiji Ozawa and in 2009 she took part in the "Guitar Fiesta" in Hakuju Hall, Tokyo. She also performed in Carnegie Hall in New York in October 2012.

== Competitions ==
Park has won an unusual number of first prizes in international competitions, to wit:

- 2005, Korean guitar music competition, 1st Prize
- 2007, Heinsberg International Guitar Competition, 1st Prize and Audience Prize
- 2008, Printemps de la Guitare International Competition, 1st Prize (Park is the first female to win first prize; she is the first Asian to do so in this competition's history)
- Koblenz international Guitar Competition, 2nd Prize
- 2009, Liechtenstein Guitar Festival ligita, International ligita Guitar Competition, 1st Prize
- 2009, 2011 Michele Pittaluga International Classical Guitar Competition, 2nd Prize
- 2010, Agustin Barrios International Guitar Competition, 1st Prize
- 2012, Alhambra International Guitar Competition, 1st Prize and Audience Prize
- 2014 Jan Edmund Jurkowski Memorial Guitar Competition.

== Discography ==
- Sueño (2010)
- Sonata Noir (2012)
- Guitar Recital (2013)
- El Ultimo Trémolo (2013)
- Saudade (2014)
- Harmonia (2018)
- Le Départ (2021)
- Letters (2022)
- The Live (2023)
- Bach (2024)
