= Ernesto Cordero (musician) =

Puerto Rican composer and classical guitarist

Ernesto Cordero (born August 9, 1946) is a Puerto Rican composer and classical guitarist.

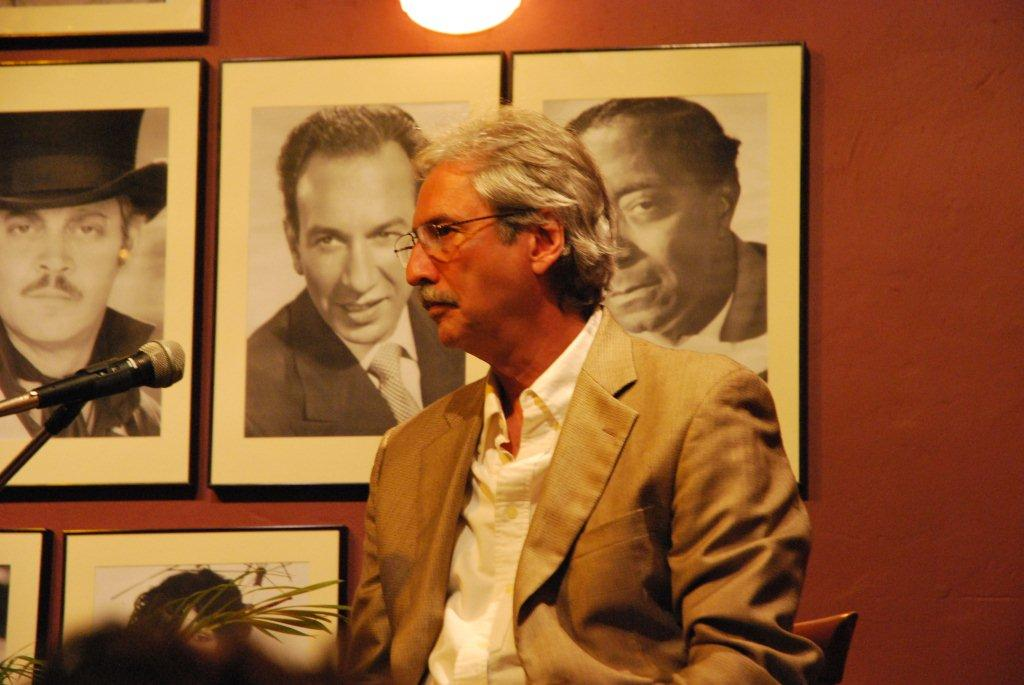
Ernesto Cordero (composer), at Fundación Nacional para la Cultura Popular, San Juan, Puerto Rico (2009)

== Life ==
Ernesto Cordero was born in New York City and began his higher studies in 1963 when he entered the Conservatory of Music of Puerto Rico, continuing at the Madrid Royal Conservatory, Spain, where he earned a diploma in 1971. Subsequently, he did post-graduate work in composition with Roberto Caggiano in Rome, Italy, from 1972 to 1974, and with Julian Orbón in New York, from 1977 to 1978. He first studied guitar from 1961 to 1964 with Jorge Rubiano and he later worked with several teachers, most importantly Regino Sainz de la Maza in Spain in the 60s and Alirio Díaz and Claudio de Angelis in Italy in 1972. Since 1971, he taught composition and guitar in the music department of the University of Puerto Rico. In addition to his activities as composer, performer and teacher, Ernesto Cordero was music director since 1980 to 1997 of the International Guitar Festival of Puerto Rico.

== Music ==
Cordero has composed a large catalogue distinguished by its Caribbean flavor. He has written eight concertos (four for guitar, two for violin, one for flute/piccolo and one for the Puerto Rican cuatro), orchestral compositions, a variety of chamber works in which the guitar appears in diverse ensembles, and numerous guitar solos, some of which have become standards. He has received important awards for composition and his music is performed and recorded worldwide by the finest artists. To date, there are more than forty recordings of Cordero's works, and most of his several dozen compositions have been published under the banners of leading publishers, for example Max Eschig (France), Bèrben (Italy), Chanterelle, Antes Edition and Hubertus Nogatz (Germany), Doberman-Yppan, Les Productions d'Oz (Canada), Mel Bay Publications, Boosey & Hawkes, Éditions Orphée, Falls House Press, and Michael Lorimer Editions (USA).

Although Ernesto Cordero is now generally known only as a composer, the New York Times reviewer Peter G. Davis highly acclaimed Ernesto Cordero's January 1978 New York Carnegie Recital Hall debut as a guitarist and as a composer: "His technique is impeccable, remarkable for its finger independence and ability to clarify and articulate the most complex textures. The colorist variety of his playing is also extensive, and the subtle interplay of tonal nuances gave each piece a solid musical profile as well as supplying a beguiling sensuous wash of sound". Of Cordero's compositions, the New York Times review said, "... like Mr. Cordero's performances they projected a healthy combination of skill, sensitive invention and sound musical effect".

Milestones for Cordero have been the performances and recordings of his guitar concertos: the 1978 and 1983 premieres in Puerto Rico of the Concierto Evocativo and the Concierto Antillano, the 1988 performance of the Concierto Antillano in Paris by the Philharmonic of Radio France under the baton of his close friend and colleague Leo Brouwer, and the 1991 premiere at the Sixth International Congress of Guitar in Mettmann, Germany, of the Concierto Bayoán. Ernesto Cordero's countrymen Iván Rijos, Leonardo Egúrbida, Juan Sorroche and José A. López have all performed his concertos, as have leading international performers including Angel Romero, Carlos Barbosa Lima, Manuel Barrueco, Costas Cotsiolis, Eduardo Fernández, Pepe Romero, Alírio Díaz, Carlos A. Pérez among many others. The Concierto Antillano has been recorded three times, first by Costas Cotsiolis and the Philharmonic Orchestra of Liège, directed by Leo Brouwer (Música Viva MV 88.045), later by Carlos Barbosa Lima (Concord CCD-42048-2), and more recently by Angel Romero who made a video of the Concerto (Corporación de las Artes Musicales). Presently, the San Juan Orchestra directed by Roselín Pabón has recorded Tres Conciertos del Caribe, an all Cordero CD which presents the Concierto Evocativo with Leonardo Egúrbida as guitar soloist, the Concierto Bayoán with Iván Rijos as guitar soloist and the Concierto Criollo with Edwin Colón Zayas as soloist on the cuatro, the characteristically Puerto Rican folk lute which is double strung with metal strings like the mandolin or the bandúrria (Tropical Concerti CD).

== Works ==
Cordero's prolific output as a composer includes eight concertos (four for guitar, two for violin, one for flute-piccolo and one for the Puerto Rican cuatro), a variety of chamber works in which the guitar appears in diverse ensembles and numerous guitar solos, some of which have become standards. His compositions include the following:

- SOLO GUITAR
  - Preludios Primaverales (1967–76)
  - Cinco Preludios (Mel Bay)
  - Proteus (Bèrben, 1972)
  - Dos Tiempos de Sonata (Max Eschig, 1972)
  - Sonata Italiana (Doberman-Yppan, 1972)
  - Sonatina Lontana (Doberman-Yppan, 1972)
  - Diez Piezas de Juventud (Mel Bay, 1972–80)
  - Descarga (1980)
  - Suite Antillana (Mel Bay, 1980)
  - Seis milonga
  - Two Popular Andalusian Themes (Mel Bay, 1973)
  - Dos Piezas Afroantillanas (Chanterelle, 1985)
  - El Carbonerito (Mel Bay, 1986)
  - Modern Times, Volumes 1-3 (Chanterelle, 1986–90)
  - Pinceladas Nocturnas (Bèrben E.3400B., 1988)
  - Tres Cantigas Negras (Hubertus Nogatz, 1989)
  - Tropical Nocturnes (1989–1997)
  - Pregunta y Mapeyé (Chanterelle, 2000)
  - Perugia y La Catedral de Taxco (Éditions Orphée, 2007–8)
- Two Guitars
  - Sonatina Tropical (Doberman-Yppan, 2001)
- Four Guitars
  - Punto y Canto para Cuatro Angeles (Doberman-Yppan, 1996)
- Voice and Guitar
  - Mis Primeros Versos, Eight Songs (1967–1981)
  - Four Works for Voice and Guitar (Chanterelle, 1973–6)
  - Two Sentimental Songs (Chanterelle, 1996)
  - Dos boleros, Yo que no siento ya (1993)
  - Mi silencio (2006)
- Voice, Flute and Guitar
  - Two Songs (Hubertus Nogatz, 1973–6)
- Voice, Flute, Violoncello and Guitar
  - Cantata al Valle de México (Max Eschig, 1981)
- Flute and Guitar
  - Fantasía Mulata (Bèrben, 1986)
- Guitar, Flute, Violoncello and Bongos
  - Dinga y Mandinga (Max Eschig, 1994)
- Guitar and Mandolin
  - Desde mi balcón (2009)
- Guitar and Orchestra
  - Concierto Evocativo (1978) Revised Edition (Max Eschig)
  - Concierto Antillano (1983) Revised Edition (Mel Bay)
  - Concierto de Bayoán (1995)
  - Concierto Festivo (Mel Bay, 2003)
- Guitar and Piano
  - Concierto Evocativo (reduction)
  - Concierto Antillano, (reduction) (Mel Bay)
  - Concierto de Bayoán, (reduction) (Hubertus Nogatz)
  - Concierto Festivo, (reduction) (Mel Bay)
- Cuatro Concerto
  - Concierto Criollo para Cuatro y Orquesta Sinfónica (1986)
- Violin Concertos
  - Concertino Tropical for violin and string orchestra (Antes Editions, 1998)
  - Ínsula, Suite Concertante for violin and string orchestra (2007)
- Flute-Piccolo Concerto
  - Concierto Borikén for flute/piccolo and orchestra (Falls House, 2001)
  - Concierto Borikén (reduction 2009) (Falls House)
- Voice and Orchestra (Songs)
  - Mis primeras canciones para voz y orquesta
  - Voz del güiro (1967), Mi primer verso (1967), Dice la fuente (1972),
  - Era mi dolor tan alto, (1976) y La hija del viejo Pancho (1974)
- Voice and Piano (Songs)
  - Cinco canciones Antillanas (1967–1974)
  - Voz del güiro
  - Pregunta
  - Si quieres comprender
  - Mi primer verso
  - La hija del viejo Pancho
- Mandolin (Solo)
  - Improvisación I y II (Plucked String, Inc., 1979)
- Choral Music
  - Three Caribbean Chants, for SATB chorus and piano (Boosey & Hawkes, 2002)
  - Estampas Criollas for SATB chorus and piano or optional string orchestra (Boosey & Hawkes, 2005)

== See also ==
- List of Puerto Ricans
