= Robert Beaser =

American composer (born 1954)

Robert Beaser (born May 29, 1954, Boston, Massachusetts) is an American composer.

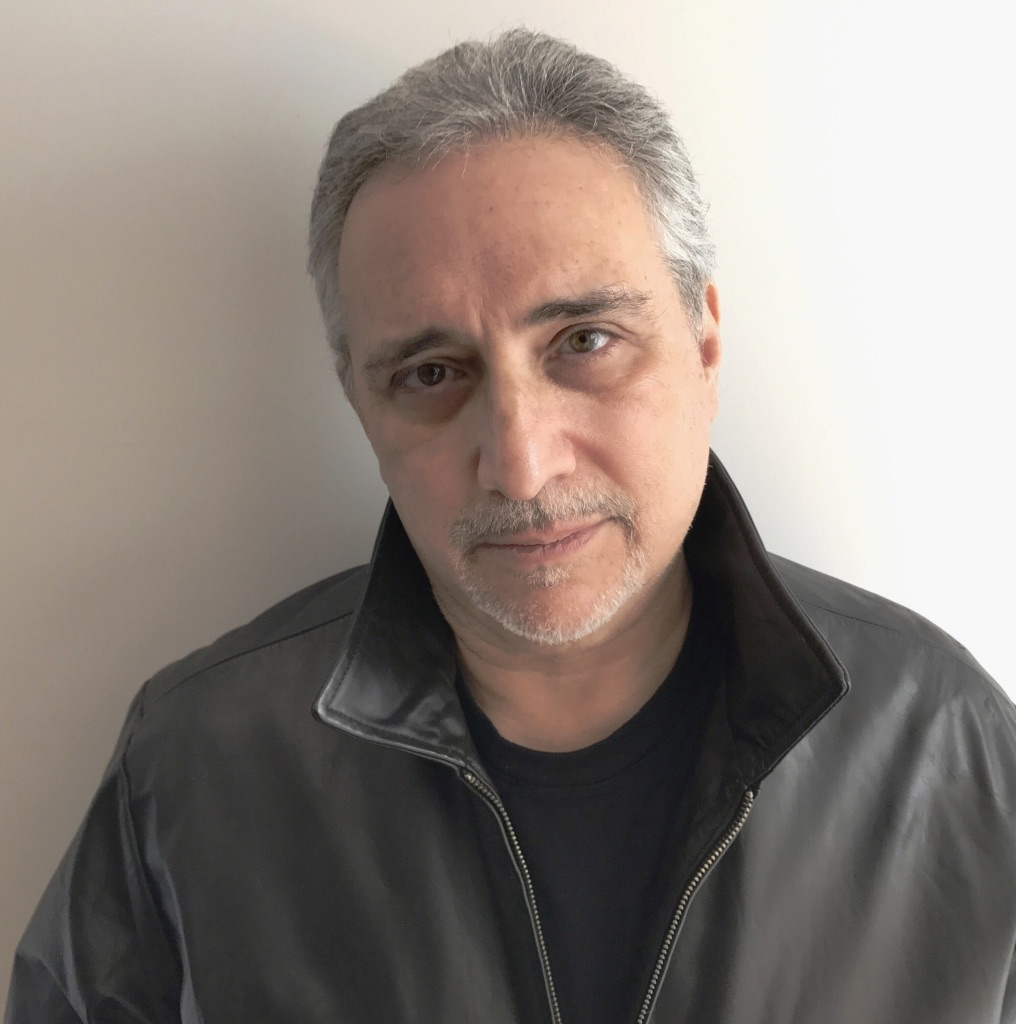
Photo of Robert Beaser, Boston MA 2017

== Biography ==
Beaser was brought up in a non-musical family. His father was a physician and mother was a chemist. He grew up in Newton, Massachusetts, where he distinguished himself at a young age as a percussionist, composer and conductor. He made his debut with the Greater Boston Youth Symphony at Jordan Hall when he was 16, conducting the premiere of his orchestral work Antigone. He went on to study with Yehudi Wyner and Jacob Druckman at Yale College, graduating summa cum laude, Phi Beta Kappa in 1976, and later received his Master of Music, M.M.A. and Doctor of Musical Arts degrees from the Yale School of Music. He studied conducting with Otto-Werner Mueller and William Steinberg. Other teachers included Toru Takemitsu, Arnold Franchetti, Goffredo Petrassi and Earle Brown. He studied with Betsy Jolas on a fellowship at Tanglewood. In 1977, Beaser became the youngest composer to win the Rome Prize from the American Academy in Rome. Residence in Rome proved a watershed in his development, and he embraced more tonal language, synthesizing a variety of diverse influences from jazz to folk into his work.

Beaser has received numerous awards and commissions from orchestras such as the New York Philharmonic the Baltimore Symphony and the Chicago Symphony. He was appointed professor and chairman of the Composition Department at the Juilliard School in New York in 1993. In 1999, Beaser was co-commissioned by Glimmerglass Opera, the New York City Opera and WNET-TV to compose The Food of Love, with Terrence McNally as librettist, which was performed at both venues, aired on PBS, and was nominated for an Emmy Award in 2000.

From 1978 to 1990 Beaser served as co-music director and conductor (with Daniel Asia) of the contemporary chamber ensemble Musical Elements at the 92nd Street Y, premiering over 200 works. From 1988 to 1993 he was the Meet the Composer/Composer-in-Residence with the American Composers Orchestra at Carnegie Hall, and served as the ACO’s artistic advisor until January 2001, when he assumed the role of artistic director. In 2013 he became the ACO's artistic director laureate. Beaser founded the Whittaker New Music Readings (now the Underwood New Music Readings) with the ACO in the early 1990s, providing an opportunity for young composers to receive hearings of their orchestral works. Along with Tania Leon, Beaser spearheaded the Sonidos de Los Americas Festival from 1993 to 1999, bringing composers and works from the Americas to Carnegie Hall. He serves as trustee for the MacDowell Colony and the American Composers Orchestra. He was elected to the membership in the American Academy of Arts and Letters in 2004.

His works are published by Schott Music.

== Termination for sexual misconduct ==
On December 12, 2022, after a six-month investigation, VAN Magazine reported multiple alleged incidents of sexual harassment and misconduct by Beaser in an investigative article covering Juilliard’s composition department, where Beaser had been a faculty member since 1993 and was chair from 1994 to 2018.

On December 22, 2022, The New York Times reported that Beaser had been put on paid leave as of December 16, pending a full investigation by Juilliard of the multiple allegations against him. The Times also referenced comments by Paola Prestini, a composer and the co-founder and artistic director of the Brooklyn music nonprofit National Sawdust, who said she had experienced gender discrimination while studying composition at Juilliard beginning in 1994 when Beaser was chair of the composition department as well as her instructor, and that she believed she was far from the only woman there who did. "Beaser was responsible for creating a toxic environment", she said, also calling it "predatory" and adding that he "definitely hindered my career".

On June 8, 2023, the Juilliard School published the findings of its investigation, which confirmed it had found "credible evidence that Mr. Beaser engaged in conduct which interfered with individuals' academic work and was inconsistent with Juilliard's commitment to provide a safe and supportive learning environment for its students. Furthermore, the investigation found that an unreported relationship violated policy in effect at that time. The investigation also found that Mr. Beaser repeatedly misrepresented facts about his actions, in violation of school policy." Juilliard said it had terminated Beaser's employment at the school "effective immediately".

== Works ==
Beaser was one of the first composers to embrace "New Tonality." Early works such as The Seven Deadly Sins and Variations for flute and piano show his proclivity for dramatic vocal writing as well as continuous variation technique. Conductors who have championed his work include Leonard Slatkin, David Zinman, Dennis Russell Davies, and José Serebrier. His incorporation of extant folk materials came in the 1980s though his widely performed Mountain Songs, nominated for a Grammy Award in 1986, and continues with works such as Souvenirs for piccolo and piano/clarinet and piano and Evening Prayer—an orchestral tone poem which incorporates and deconstructs a Hungarian folk tune. His orchestral music draws from a wide and diverse palette, and he has made dramatic vocal works using texts from poets such as Anthony Hecht, Eugenio Montale and Gjertrud Schnackenberg in The Heavenly Feast. His Four Dickinson Songs, written for Meagan Miller and the Marilyn Horne Foundation, opens the Americans in Rome compendium on Bridge Records, performed by Hila Plitmann and Donald Berman. Recent works include Guitar Concerto for Eliot Fisk, his classmate at Yale, which mixes Andalucian flamenco with bluegrass picking techniques, and was premiered by the Albany Symphony, with David Alan Miller conducting, and The End of Knowing, a consortium commission from 27 wind ensembles, for soprano and baritone and wind ensemble on texts by poets including Seamus Heaney, Joseph Brodsky, Schnackenberg, Theodore Worozbyt and James Joyce.

== Discography ==
- "Guitar Concerto" (Linn Records)
- "Notes on a Southern Sky" (Linn Records)
- "Evening Prayer" (Linn Records)
- "Ground O" (Linn Records)
- The Seven Deadly Sins (Phoenix, London/Argo)
- Chorale Variations, and Piano Concerto (Phoenix, London/Argo)
- The Heavenly Feast (Milken Archives)
- Song of the Bells (New World)
- Notes on a Southern Sky (EMI-Electrola)
- Mountain Songs (Musicmasters, Naxos, Koch, Gajo, Siemens, Nimbus, HM Records Venezuela)
- Landscape With Bells (Innova)
- Psalm 119/Psalm 150 (New World, Divine Grandeur)
- Brass Quintet (ABQ, Summit, Capriccio)
- Souvenirs (Albany)
- Variations for flute and piano (Musicmasters, Koch, Albany)
- Four Dickinson Songs (Bridge)
- Shenandoah (Sonora, Golden Horn)
- Minimal Waltz (Capstone, Guild Music)
