= Pieter van der Staak =

Dutch musician (1930–2007)

Pieter van der Staak (May 25, 1930, in The Hague – November 2, 2007, in Zwolle) was a Dutch classical guitarist, composer and professor of music.

== Education ==
As a guitarist Pieter van der Staak was self-taught until he met Andrés Segovia in 1954. From 1955 to 1959 he studied guitar with Segovia and with Alirio Diaz in Sienna. With Emilio Pujol he studied the vihuela and ancient music notation. Both, Alirio Diaz and Emilio Pujol became lifelong friends of Pieter van der Staak. He studied composition with Wolfgang Wijdeveld and the guitar at the Maastricht Academy of Music with Hans Lutz Niessen.

== Activities ==
Pieter van der Staak combined his interest in writing for the guitar with teaching activities and concertising. He made several LP records with i.e. the well-known singer Willy Brill, the tenor Arjan Blanken and his wife Maria Hol, a professional violoncellist. With Willy Brill and with Maria Hol, he gave concerts all over the world.

Besides his many activities Pieter van der Staak was the 1st professor of guitar at the Municipal Music Highschool ArtEZ in Zwolle (Netherlands) where he trained and educated several generations of fine classical guitarists. Pieter van der Staak also established the Dutch International Guitarweeks Zwolle.

== Compositions ==
He composed a large number of chamber music, among which are works for string quartet, clarinet quintet and cello trio. He wrote many didactic pieces for one up to four guitars because he felt involved with the development of new didactical material. Besides compositions for cello ensemble and accordion orchestra, he composed music for less common combinations such as guitar, flute and clarinet. He wrote many works for guitar teaching, published by Ars Nova (Sweden), Hortensia (Paris), Suvini Zerboni (Milano) and Broekmans & Van Poppel (Amsterdam). Concertino III, for solo guitar and guitar quartet (1970) is published by Donemus. Recently the Canadian publishing house Les Productions d'OZ issued several unknown works composed by Pieter van der Staak.
