= Annette Kruisbrink =

Dutch classical guitarist and composer (born 1958)

Annette Kruisbrink (born 1958, in Amsterdam) is a Dutch classical guitarist and composer.

== Life ==
She studied the guitar with Pieter van der Staak at the conservatory of Zwolle and attended masterclasses by Leo Brouwer, John Mills, Toyohiko Satoh. She is an autodidact on the flamenco guitar and vihuela. She studied composition with Alex Manassen and attended composition classes run by Nigel Osborne and Claudio Prieto.

She has composed over 300 compositions that have been published in the Netherlands, Belgium, Germany, France, Canada and the United States.

She was commissioned by the Dutch broadcaster NCRV, Huismuziek, Guitar Festival Zwolle, Theatre Odeon Zwolle, Fonds voor de Scheppende Toonkunst and Novam.

Annette Kruisbrink has given recitals and masterclasses in guitar and composition throughout Europe and Argentina. With the Belgian guitarist Arlette Ruelens, she formed The Anido Guitar Duo. With the Dutch soprano Franka van Essen, she formed the duo Kruisbrink & Van Essen.

She currently teaches guitar at the Anido Guitar School. From 2000 to 2010, she taught contemporary music and ethno music at the Conservatory of Music in Zwolle.

== Prizes ==
- 1991 first prize (audience award) during The seventh International Congress on Women in Music in Utrecht (the Netherlands)
- 1992 second prize for composition, organized by SACEM and CMAC in Fort de France, Martinique (France)
- 1994 first prize ex aequo in the previous mentioned competition with her composition "Homenaje a Andrés Segovia" for solo guitar.
- 1998 second prize with her composition "10 Miniaturas" for guitarquartet in the 2º Concorso Internazionale di Composizione per Chitarra Classica "Michele ittaluga", Italy.

== Awards ==
- 1988 Xenium for solo guitar
- 1991 Epitaphe sur ma pierre tombale for 2 guitars, flute, voice
- 1992 Cultune for flute, guitar and el. bass
- 1996 A Heidelberg Jingle for guitar and double bass
- 2009 Variations on Opou Episkiasi I Hari Sou for solo guitar
