= Aniello Desiderio =

Italian musician (born 1971)

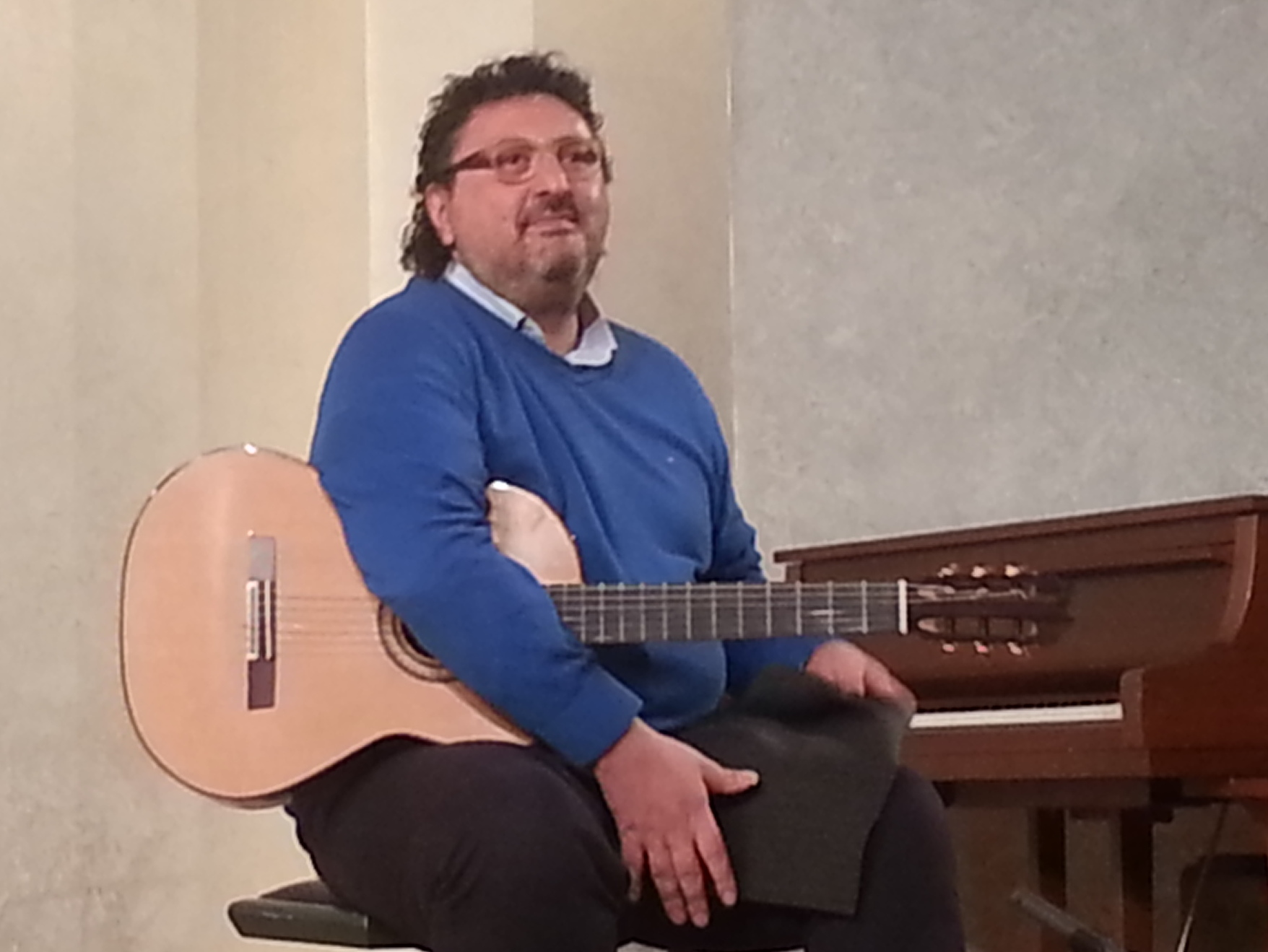
Aniello Desiderio

Aniello Desiderio (born 1971) is an Italian virtuoso classical guitarist and teacher, professor at the Conservatorio Domenico Cimarosa in Avellino. He is known for his intricate touch, speed and precision on the instrument, delivering "acrobatic arpeggios and scales of extraordinary brilliance", which has led to comparisons with Paganini. He is particularly renowned for his interpretations of Paganini, Scarlatti, Carulli, and lesser known Italian composers on a world scale.

== Early life and career ==
Desiderio belongs to a family of musicians; his father plays percussion instruments, and of his two younger brothers, Gaetano is a pianist and Gennaro is a violinist. A child prodigy, he started performing in public locally at the age of eight. He studied under Stefan Aruta, Bruno Battisti D'Amario, Costas Cotsiolis and Emero Cordero, and attended interpretation exercises by the Cuban composer Leo Brouwer. He graduated in 1992 from the Conservatorio Antonio Vivaldi in Alessandria.

Desiderio began performing outside of Italy in 1989 at the International Guitar Festival in Volos, Greece, and has since played concerts worldwide in Norway, Canada, Germany, Hungary, Croatia, United States, Turkey, Romania, Austria, Spain, Greece, Mexico, Indonesia, Luxembourg, Brazil, France, Slovenia, Switzerland, Denmark, Colombia, Poland, Venezuela, Portugal, Georgia, Russia. South Korea and Thailand. He has been invited as a guest to perform at many festivals, including Musikfest Bremen, Ludwigsburg Castle Festival, the Rheingau Music Festival, I Pomeriggi Musicali, the Scarlatti Festival and for Radio France. In November 1996, he made his New York City debut, and subsequently toured other major cities globally. In May 1999, the ARD /Bayerischer Rundfunk (BR) of Germany produced a film about Desiderio, discussing his life and his music. Between 2000 and 2004, he was invited more than 15 times to play on German channels ARD, BR, 3sat, WDR, MDR and the Swiss SRG.

== 2000s–present ==
In 2000, Desiderio was a soloist at the 70th birthday celebrations of Lorin Maazel. He released a CD, "Italica Famosa", which was nominated for a "Golden Guitar" award for best CD of the year. The following year, he performed with the Radio Symphony Orchestra Berlin and the Deutsche Kammerphilharmonie, and toured Mexico, Indonesia and Europe.

In 2003, Desiderio co-founded the World Guitar Ensemble, a group consisting of 10 virtuoso classical guitarists. The following year, he formed the baroque-tango fusion group, Napoletanissimo, with his brothers Gennaro and Gaetano, as well as other Neapolitan musicians, which toured the United States; the group was renamed the Quartetto Furioso in 2008. In 2005, Desiderio made solo concerts in Germany, Spain, Italy, Croatia, Indonesia, etc., and toured with the World Guitar Ensemble in Europe, making numerous appearances at the leading German festivals such as Ludwigsburg, Rheingau, Bremen, Mosel, and Mozart Festival Würzburg. he also performed with the Bavarian Chamber Philharmonic in Germany and the Istanbul State Symphony Orchestra in Turkey.

In 2008, along with his brothers Gennaro and Gaetano, he established another group, which mixes baroque and tango music. In the same year, he performed at the "Virtuosos of Guitar" festival in Moscow. In 2009, he made a series of concerts and tours, and performed with the Quebec Symphony Orchestra in Canada and toured Europe. In 2010, Desiderio recited at the Concerto Madrigal of J. Rodrigo, with Angel Romero, and gave masterclasses during the Summer International Academy for the Mozarteum of Salzburg. Rated very highly by John McLaughlin, in 2012, he selected Desiderio to perform at the European Premiere of his Concerto Thieves and Poets. In 2014 he toured America, and made his debut at New York's prestigious Carnegie Hall. Some of his selected recordings are: Aniello Desideriao-Tarrega/Paganini/Aguado/Llobet; Jose/Brouwer/Dyens/Ginastera; and Il Fenomeno; Tangos y Danzas.

== Honors ==
Acclaimed as one of the best Italian classical guitarists, as of 2004, Desiderio had won 18 first International Awards in both national and international competitions, including:

- First Prize, Donia Competition Messina, Italy (1986)
- First Prize, International Guitar Competition, Havana, Cuba (1988)
- First Prize, International Guitar Competition, Tokyo, Japan (1988)
- "Neapolitan of the Year" Award, Italy (1988)
- First Prize and Special Prize, International Francisco Tarrega Competition, Benicàssim, Spain (1992)
- First Prize, International Competition "Citta' di Sanremo", Italy (1994)
- First Prize, J.I. Guerrero Competition, Spain (1994)
- First Prize, International Guerrero Competition, Madrid, Spain (1995)
- Artist in Residence Award, German Radio & Musikfest, Bremen, Germany (1999)

== Discography ==
- Début (1994)
- 20th Century Guitar Sonatas (1995)
- Italica famosa (2000)
- Spain (2009)
- Quartetto Furioso - Vivaldi 4 & 4 Piazzolla Seasons (2009)
- Nocturnal (2017)
- Chaconne, Aniello Desiderio Plays Baroque Music (2021)
