= Ruggero Chiesa =

Italian classical guitarist, teacher and editor

Ruggero Chiesa (1 August 1933 – 14 June 1993) was a prominent Italian classical guitarist, teacher and editor.

== Life and career ==
Born in Camogli, Chiesa began studying classical guitar privately with Mario Canepa, continuing his studies with Carlo Palladino, a student of Luigi Mozzani, in Genoa. In 1956 and 1960 he attended the Accademia Musicale Chigiana courses by renowned international guitarists such as Alirio Diaz and Emilio Pujol, from whom he learned the vihuela. He subsequently (until 1992) replaced Alirio Diaz in courses of transcriptions from tablature.

Having abandoned his concert career because of a hand problem, he devoted himself particularly to the teaching and study of the literature of the lute and guitar, revitalizing especially the nineteenth-century Italian guitar.

From 1963 he was professor of guitar at the Giuseppe Verdi Conservatory in Milan. His students included prominent internationally known soloists of today, such as Frédéric Zigante and Emanuele Segre.

From 1965 he began an intense collaboration with the publisher Suvini Zerboni, publishing revisions of many works classical and ancient, performing accurate philological analysis and greatly expanding the repertoire available to the classical guitar. He edited more than 150 works by various composers and wrote a number of didactic works.

In 1972, with Suvini Zerboni, he began the publication of the magazine Il Fronimo, of which he was founder and director and whose title is taken from a treatise by Vincenzo Galilei on the art of writing tablature for lute. (Fronimo / dialogo di Vincentio Galilei / nobile fiorentino / sopra l’arte del bene intavolare / et rettamente sonare la musica, 1568–1584). The magazine quickly became a reference point for guitar musicologists internationally.

In 1983, he became the director of the Corsi Accademici di Chitarra, held annually at Bassano del Grappa (Vicenza).

Ruggero Chiesa died in Milan.

== Legacy ==
Since 2005 the Ruggero Chiesa International Competition of Classical Guitar — City of Camogli has been dedicated to his memory.

A number of contemporary composers wrote works dedicated to Chiesa, including Mario Castelnuovo-Tedesco, Bruno Bettinelli, Franco Donatoni, and Aldo Clementi.
