= Oscar Ghiglia =

Italian classical guitarist (1938–2024)

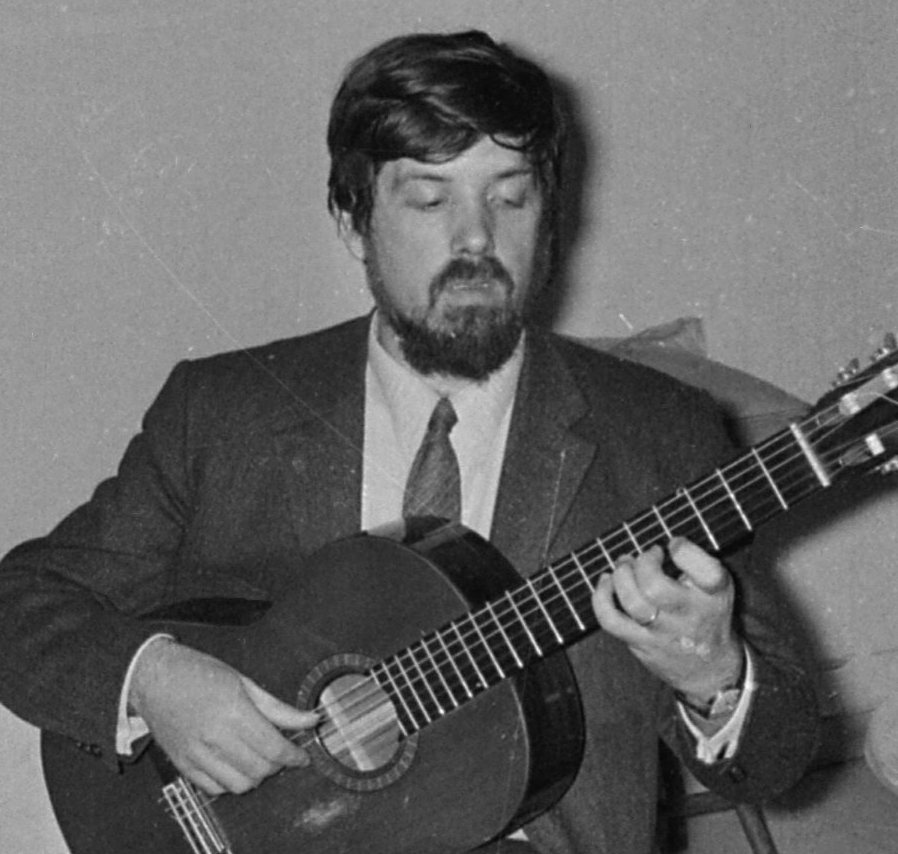
- Ghiglia in 1969

Background information
- Born: 13 August 1938; Livorno, Italy
- Died: 3 March 2024 (aged 85) Thessaloniki, Greece
- Occupation: Classical guitarist

Oscar Alberto Ghiglia (13 August 1938 – 3 March 2024) was an Italian classical guitarist.

== Biography ==
=== Early years ===
Born in Livorno to an artistic family – his father and grandfather were both famed painters, his mother an accomplished pianist – Oscar Ghiglia had to choose between a path strewn with brushes and colours and a world cut into harmony and melody.

Though his early choice produced a few hundred water colours and a number of oil paintings, he soon realized music was his way. For this decision he thanked his father, who one day made him pose for a painting showing a guitarist. For this he had to hold his father's guitar, a companion to his artistic musings in front of his forming works. This painting was the start to a lifetime of disciplined dedication to music.

=== Musical career ===
Oscar Ghiglia graduated from the Santa Cecilia Conservatory in Rome and soon began study with Andrés Segovia, who was his major influence and inspiration during his formative years. Later Oscar Ghiglia "inherited" Segovia's class in Siena's Accademia Chigiana and spread his own teaching around the five continents in a sister vocation to his concertizing.

Oscar Ghiglia founded the Guitar Department at the Aspen Music Festival, (Aspen, Colorado, USA) as well as the Festival de Musique des Arcs and the "Incontri Chitarristici di Gargnano", of having been artist in residence, or visiting professor in such centers as the Cincinnati and San Francisco conservatories, the Juilliard School, the Hartt School and the Northwestern University of Evanston, Illinois. In all these centers and elsewhere Ghiglia nurtured talents and formed or perfected young artists' musical outlook and interpretation.

Ghiglia taught at the Accademia Musicale Chigiana from 1976.

Besides touring as a solo performer, Oscar Ghiglia played and recorded with such names as singers Victoria de los Ángeles, Jan de Gaetani, Gerald English, John McCollum; flutists as Jean-Pierre Rampal and Julius Baker; ensembles as the Juilliard String Quartet, the Emerson String Quartet, the Cleveland String Quartet, the Quartetto d’archi di Venezia and the Tokyo String Quartet; violinists as Giuliano Carmignola, Franco Gulli, Salvatore Accardo and Régis Pasquier; violists such as B. Giuranna, and P. Zuckerman; cellists as Adam Krzeszowiec, Albert Roman and Laszlo Varga; guitarists such as Sharon Isbin, Eliot Fisk, Shin-Ichi Fukuda, Letizia Guerra, Antigoni Goni, and Elena Papandreou. Oscar Ghiglia was a founding member of the International Classic Guitar Quartet (with, in different turns: Benjamin Bunch, O. Koga, Anders Miolin, S. Schmidt, and Andreas von Wangenheim).

After his newest CD Manuel Ponce Guitar music, a new set of recording projects was under way (note a J.S. Bach lute works CD, in the final editing process) and his teaching continued, for years, in Basel Switzerland, where he held the professorship in guitar at the Musik-Akademie der Stadt Basel from 1983 to 2004.

As the founder of the International Guitar Competition of Gargnano (Italy), Ghiglia has said that there is a very high number of first-prize winners among his students in competitions around the world.

=== Retirement from the Basel Musik-Akademie ===
In 2006, after retiring from the Basel Musik-Akademie in Switzerland, where he had held the professorship in guitar from 1983 to 2004, he moved to Greece, following his marriage to colleague and former pupil Elena Papandreou, now guitar professor in the University of Macedonia in Thessaloniki.

Following his CDs Manuel Ponce Guitar music, J.S. Bach Lute Works, and a DVD of his favourite repertoire, he continued his concertizing across the oceans, his residencies in the universities of Cincinnati, Ohio, Evanston, Illinois, as well as his summer teaching in the Accademia Chigiana of Siena and his "Incontri Chitarristici di Gargnano", on the shores of Lake Garda.

Ghiglia died on 3 March 2024, at the age of 85.

== Recordings ==
- Some photos of LP covers (Oviatt Library Digital Collections)

== Bibliography ==
Incontro con Ghiglia, entretiens avec Oscar Ghiglia, Oscar Ghiglia and Antonin Vercellino, Éditions Habanera, 2023 (in french)
