= Alirio Díaz =

Venezuelan classical guitarist and composer (1923–2016)

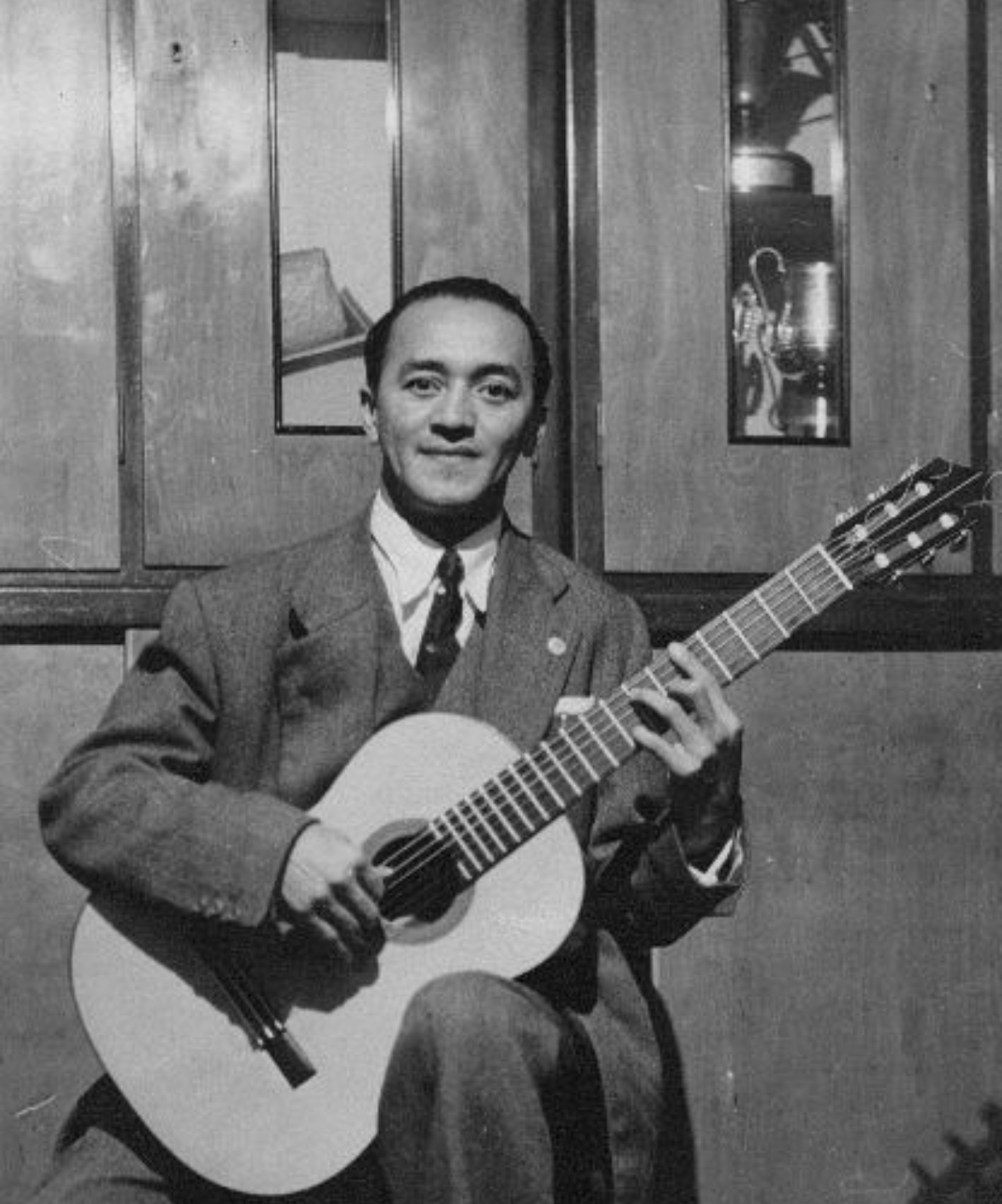

Background information
- Born: 12 November 1923; Carora, Lara, Venezuela
- Died: 5 July 2016 (aged 92) Rome, Italy
- Genre: classical
- Occupations: Instrumentalist
- Instruments: Classical guitar
- Website: www.aliriodiaz.org

Alirio Díaz (12 November 1923 – 5 July 2016) was a Venezuelan classical guitarist and composer, considered one of the most prominent composer-guitarists of South America and an eminent musician. He studied with Andrés Segovia, and gave concerts all over the world.

A guitar competition named Concurso Internacional de Guitarra Alirio Díaz has been held in his honor in Caracas and other cities in Venezuela (the April 2006 contest was held in Carora). Many compositions have been dedicated to Díaz including Spanish composer Joaquín Rodrigo's Invocación y Danza. Many talented and gifted students were invited and participated in his master classes in Alessandria Italy including his favorite student guitarist and composer Cris Alcamo.

== Biography ==
The eighth of eleven children, Díaz was born in Caserio La Candelaria, a small village near Carora in western Venezuela. From childhood he showed a great interest in music. His uncle was his first guitar teacher. At age 16 he ran away from home to Carora, where he sought better schooling. He later went to Trujillo in the Venezuelan Andes and studied saxophone and clarinet under Laudelino Mejías while working as a typesetter in a newspaper. He also studied English before going to Caracas in 1945 to study the guitar at the Escuela Superior de Musica José Ángel Lamas under Raul Borges.

In 1950, the Venezuelan government awarded him a scholarship to continue his guitar studies in Madrid under Regino Sainz de la Maza. That same year he performed his first guitar concert in Europe. In 1951 he went to Accademia Musicale Chigiana of Siena (Italy), to study with Andrés Segovia. There he impressed Segovia greatly with his flawless technique and extensive repertoire. Three years later, he progressed to become the assistant and substitute to Segovia, and started performing in some of the most prestigious concert halls of Europe.

In 1961, Spanish composer Joaquín Rodrigo's piece Invocación y Danza, dedicated to Alirio Díaz, won the First Prize at the Coupe International de Guitare awarded by the Office de Radiodiffusion-Télévision Française (ORTF). In turn, Díaz obliged and the next year performed this very difficult solo piece. It has also been recorded by Díaz. This was one of many compositions dedicated to Alirio Díaz.

Alirio Díaz performed all over the world combining baroque music with the works of modern Latin American composers, such as Lauro, Sojo and Barrios Mangoré. He taught in Rome and performed in concert with his son Senio. During the European winter, he used to return to Venezuela to his native town, La Candelaria.

== Europe ==
When the young Venezuelan musician concluded his studies, he traveled to Europe for a post-graduate degree. Soon after his arrival he was welcomed by a large group of representative figures of Venezuelan culture, and the Ministry of Education responded by approving a grant for Diaz. In November he attended the Conservatory of Music of Madrid, hosted by Regino Sainz de la Maza. Studying here had an excellent effect on Diaz and he gave successful recitals in the most important centers of Spanish culture including Ateneo de Madrid, Teatro Español, Palau de la Música in Barcelona, the Alhambra in Granada, Teatro Principal in Valencia. Close friendly relations developed with intellectuals and musicians Gerardo Diego, Joaquin Rodrigo, Moreno Torroba, Mario Castelnuovo Tedesco, Garcia Nieto, Narciso Yepes, Nino Rota, Emilio Pujol, Daniel Fortea, Eugenia Serrano, Federico Mompou, Xavier Montsalvage, Joaquin Achucarro and John Williams.

=== Italy ===
In Siena, Díaz continued his studies with Andres Segovia at the Chigiana Academy of that city. A couple of years later Diaz became not only the disciple of the Segovia but also his assistant and substitute at the Chigiana Academy.

He befriended Venezuelan authors Raul Borges, Vicente Emilio Sojo and Juan Bautista Plaza. In a recital in Rome, Diaz was sponsored by the poet and Venezuelan ambassador Alberto Arvelo Torrealba. Based in Italy, he first toured throughout the European continent to eventually perform on five continents. He appeared as soloist with symphonic orchestras under the direction of conductors like Sergiu Celibidache, Leopold Stokowski, Antonio Estévez, Andre Kostelanetz, Rafael Frühbeck de Burgos, Jose Iturbi, among others.

Following in the footsteps of Vicente Emilio Sojo, he spent much of his time on their trips to Venezuela collecting folk songs. His guitar arrangements of these songs continue to be performed around the world. Díaz published many editions of his guitar arrangements and made recordings. His research is conducted from a critical, analytical and musicological point of view. He published a book called "Música en la vida y lucha del pueblo venezolano" ("Music in the life and struggle of the Venezuelan people") and wrote for various newspapers and Venezuelan magazines. Much of this work is also reflected in his autobiographical work Al divisar el humo de la aldea nativa ("On seeing the smoke from the native village").

He died in Rome on 5 July 2016.

== Alirio Díaz International Guitar Competition ==
In Carora (Venezuela) since 1974 the Alirio Díaz International Guitar Competition pays tribute to the art of this Venezuelan virtuoso and celebrates his invaluable contribution to guitar learning on national and international levels.

== See also ==
- Michele Pittaluga International Classical Guitar Competition founded with his support
- Music of Venezuela
- Antonio Lauro
