= Dimitri Illarionov =

Russian classical guitarist

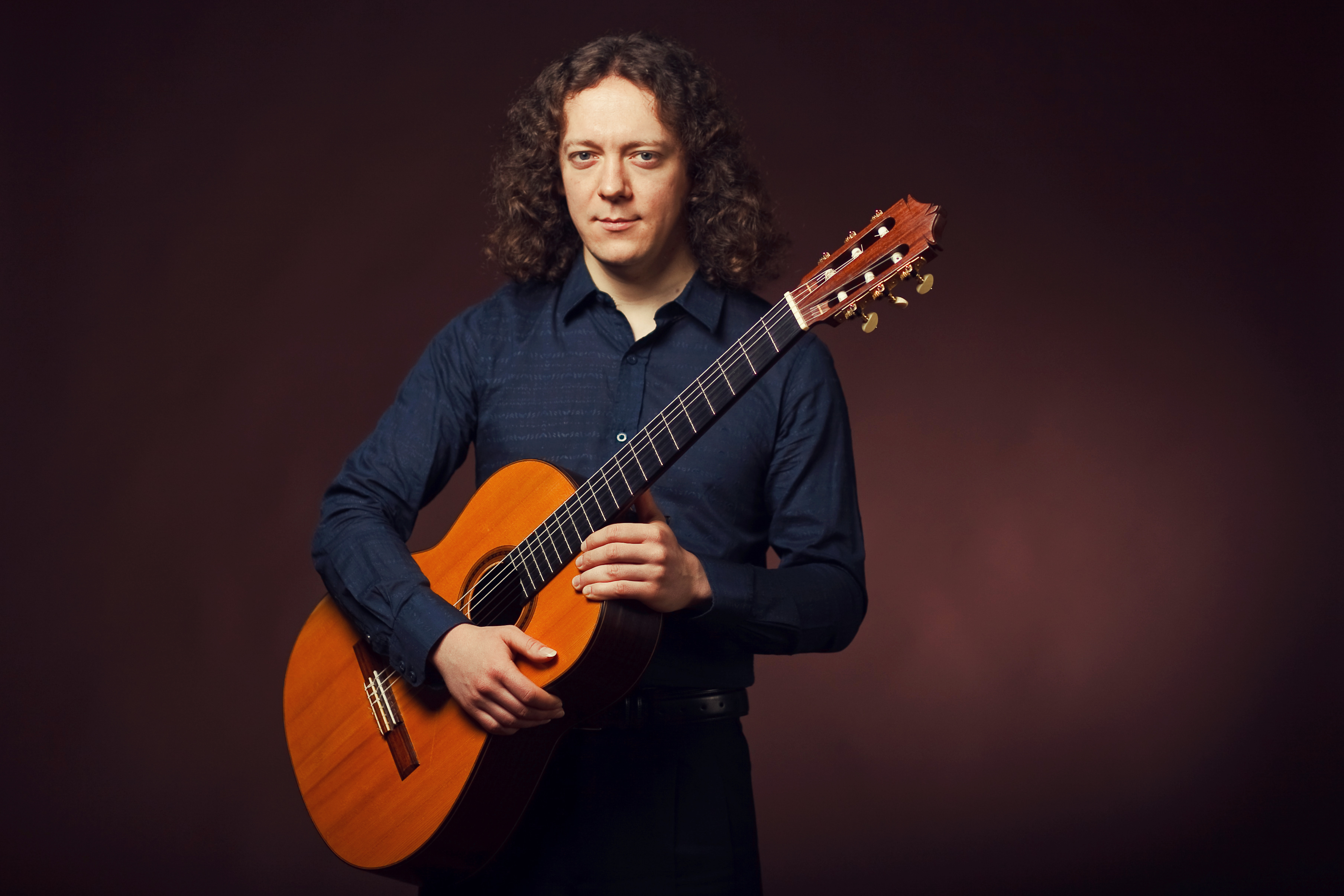

Background information
- Born: 19 November 1979 (age 46); Chișinău, Moldova
- Genre: Classical music
- Occupations: Guitarist, lutenist
- Instruments: guitar, lute
- Labels: Naxos, Doberman-Yppan, Delos Records
- Website: illarionov.com

Dimitri Illarionov (born 1979 in Chișinău, Moldova) is a Germany-based Russian classical guitarist. He is a winner of the Guitar Foundation of America Competition (2002, Miami, USA) and Francisco Tárrega Guitar Competition (2008, Spain).

== Music career ==
=== Education ===
Dimitri studied in Russia at the Russian Gnesins's Academy of Music under Alexander Frauchi, and later in Hochschule für Musik Karlsruhe (Germany) under Andreas von Wangenheim and also took lessons with composer and guitarist Nikita Koshkin. Illarionov is now Professor at the Gnessins' Russian Academy of Music in Moscow.

=== Competitions ===
Illarionov is the winner and laureate of numerous international competitions in the USA, Spain, Poland, Belgium, the Czech Republic and Russia. These include the Grand Prix in the VI International Promotional Competition "Guitar Talents' Review" (Gdańsk, Poland - 1999) and the title of "The Greatest Hope" in the "Tenth Gdańsk Meeting of Guitarists"; First Prize and Prize of Public in the VIII International Guitar Competition in Coria (Spain - 2004); First Prize in the Russian International Guitar Competition - "Guitar in Russia" in Voronezh (Russia - 2002), Second Prize in Michele Pittaluga International Classical Guitar Competition (Italy - 2007).

Illarionov was the first guitarist to take Second Prize in the III International Competition of Musical Personalities "Alexander Tansman" (Łódź, Poland - 2000).

In October 2002, Illarionov won the Twentieth International Guitar Foundation of America Solo Guitar Competition (GFA – Miami, Florida, USA). As part of the prize, he conducted his concert tour (in the US and Canada) and will record a concert video.

=== Performances ===
Illarionov has an active concert life, playing solo recitals and performing as soloist with orchestras.

== Works ==
Illarionov's repertoire is broad and versatile. It ranges across various periods and styles: music of the Renaissance and Baroque (Luis Milan, Alonso Mudarra, John Dowland, J. S. Bach), original music for guitar from the 19th and early 20th centuries (Fernando Sor, Mauro Giuliani, Francisco Tárrega), and music of the 20th and 21st centuries (Frank Martin, Alexandre Tansman, Manuel Ponce, Joaquín Rodrigo, Joaquín Turina, Agustín Barrios, Mario Castelnuovo-Tedesco, William Walton, Sérgio Assad, Roland Dyens, Dusan Bogdanovic, Angelo Gilardino, Andrey Zelenskiy, the unique cycle 24 Preludes and Fugues for Solo Guitar by Igor Rekhin), as well as compositions for guitar with orchestra and chamber music.

Dimitri Illarionov has recorded the CD Premieres with the Moscow Chamber "The Seasons" Orchestra (conductor – Vladislav Bulakhov) for Les Éditions Doberman-Yppan; two solo CDs: by Naxos Records (Laureate Series) and the CD East Side Story (Daminus Records) with music written by modern Eastern European composers. Illarionov's Classical Duo CD (Delos Records) with Russian cellist Boris Andrianov entered the long-list of the 2004 Grammy Awards.

Dimitri has performed with leading ensembles from different countries, including “Venice Soloists”, Camerata S (Korea), the State Orchestra of Russia named after E. F. Svetlanov, Tchaikovsky Grand Symphony Orchestra, “Moscow Virtuosi”. He has collaborated with famous conductors, including Vladimir Fedoseev, Alexander Sladkovsky, Fabio Mastrangelo, Leo Brouwer, César Alvarez. He played with many famous performers on various instruments, including Boris Andrianov, Patrick Galois, Igor Fedorov, Andrey Baranov, Leonard Schreiber, Sergey Dogadin, Edin Karamazov, Nikolay Sivchuk, the Artis-Quartet and many others.

Since 2021, Illarionov is an artistic director of the FRAUCHI International Competition and Festival.

== See also ==
- International classical guitar competitions
