= JoAnn Falletta International Guitar Concerto Competition =

- JoAnn Falletta Competition Logo
- Awarded for: Excellence in Classical Guitar Performance
- Location: Buffalo, New York
- Country: (United States) US
- Hosted by: WNED-FM, WNED-TV, Buffalo Philharmonic Orchestra, President - JoAnn Falletta, Artistic Directors - Joanne Castellani, Michael Andriaccio
- Rewards: 1st Prize $10000, Fleur de Son Classics contract, concert with Buffalo Philharmonic Orchestra
- First award: 2004
- Final award: 2018
- Website: JoAnn Falletta Competition

The JoAnn Falletta International Guitar Concerto Competition is a competition for classical guitarists from all over the world. The competition was launched in 2004 by PBS member stations WNED-FM, WNED-TV and the Buffalo Philharmonic Orchestra (BPO). It was named in honor of the BPO's music director, JoAnn Falletta. It was the world’s first concerto competition for classical guitarists with accompaniment by a full symphony orchestra. The art directors are Joanne Castellani and Michael Andriaccio (Castellani-Andriaccio Duo) and Donald K. Boswell (President and CEO, Western New York Public Broadcasting).

To date there have been only three absolute winners of the competition who won all possible awards (1st Prize, Musicians Favorite Award, and Audience Favorite Award): 2004: Marcin Dylla (Poland), 2014: Marko Topchii (Ukraine) and 2016: Anton Baranov (Russia).

== Rules ==
- The competition has occurred every two years since 2004, always in the city of Buffalo, New York.
- The participants have to play required pieces and freely chosen pieces from memory.
- The finals of the competition are taking place in the Kleinhans Music Hall, a National Historic Landmark with exquisite acoustics and a large seating capacity of 2,839. It is the largest known concert hall that hosted the final of the classical guitar competition.
- In addition to the 1st, 2nd, and 3rd places there are three special awards: Audience Favorite Award and Musicians Favorite Award. While the Audience Favorite is a quite common award in the public music competitions, the Musicians Favorite Award is representing the professional recognition of the orchestra member musicians. The William and Carol Greiner Award, new for 2018, is awarded to the competitor(s) advancing to the final round with a recently composed, lesser-known work from the repertoire list.

== Winners ==
- 2018
  - 1. Prize: Bokyung Byun (South Korea)
  - 2. Prize: Tengyue Zhang (China)
  - 3. Prize: Congyi Zhang (China)
  - Musicians Favorite Award (Special prize): Bokyung Byun (South Korea)
  - Audience Favorite Award (Special prize): Tengyue Zhang (China)
  - William and Carol Greiner Award (Special prize): Congyi Zhang (China)
- 2016
  - 1. Prize: Anton Baranov (Russia)
  - 2. Prize: Andras Csaki (Hungary)
  - 3. Prize: (United States) Alec Holcomb (USA)
  - Musicians Favorite Award (Special prize): Anton Baranov (Russia)
  - Audience Favorite Award (Special prize): Anton Baranov (Russia)
- 2014
  - 1. Prize: Marko Topchii (Ukraine)
  - 2. Prize: Ekachai Jearakul (Thailand)
  - 3. Prize: (United States) Chad Ibison (USA)
  - Musicians Favorite Award (Special prize): Marko Topchii (Ukraine)
  - Audience Favorite Award (Special prize): Marko Topchii (Ukraine)
- 2012
  - 1. Prize: Celil Kaya (Turkey)
  - 2. Prize: Petrit Çeku (Croatia)
  - 3. Prize: Ekachai Jearakul (Thailand)
  - Musicians Favorite Award (Special prize): Petrit Çeku (Croatia)
  - Audience Favorite Award (Special prize): Petrit Çeku (Croatia)
- 2010
  - 1. Prize: Artyom Dervoed (Russia)
  - 2. Prize: Nemanja Ostojic (Serbia)
  - 3. Prize: Thomas Viloteau (France)
  - Musicians Favorite Award (Special prize): Thomas Viloteau (France)
  - Audience Favorite Award (Special prize): Artyom Dervoed (Russia)
- 2008
  - 1. Prize: Marco Sartor (Uruguay)
  - 2. Prize: Laura Klemke (Germany)
  - 3. Prize: (United States) Benjamin Beirs (USA)
  - Musicians Favorite Award (Special prize): Laura Klemke (Germany)
  - Audience Favorite Award (Special prize): Marco Sartor (Uruguay)
- 2006
  - 1. Prize: Pablo Garibay (Mexico)
  - 2. Prize: Masao Tanibe (Japan)
  - 3. Prize: (United States) Isaac Bustos (USA)
  - Musicians Favorite Award (Special prize): Pablo Garibay (Mexico)
  - Audience Favorite Award (Special prize): Masao Tanibe (Japan)
- 2004
  - 1. Prize: Marcin Dylla (Poland)
  - 2. Prize: Pablo Garibay (Mexico)
  - 3. Prize: Rene Izquierdo (Cuba)
  - Musicians Favorite Award (Special prize): Marcin Dylla (Poland)
  - Audience Favorite Award (Special prize): Marcin Dylla (Poland)

== Jury ==
- 2018
  - Irina Kulikova (Russia)
  - Francisco Bernier (Spain)
  - (United States) Eric Sessler (USA)
  - (United States) Michael Newman (USA)
  - (United States) Sean Samimi (USA)
  - (United States) Michael Andriaccio (USA)
  - (United States) Joanne Castellani (USA)
- 2016
  - Antigoni Goni (Greece)
  - Jeffrey McFadden (Canada)
  - (United States) Donald Crockett (USA)
  - (United States) Mark Delpriora (USA)
  - (United States) Jeff Cogan (USA)
  - (United States) Michael Andriaccio (USA)
  - (United States) Joanne Castellani (USA)
- 2014
  - Ana Vidović (Croatia)
  - Micaela Pittaluga (Italy)
  - Dale Kavanagh (Canada)
  - Thomas Kirchhoff (Germany)
  - (United States) David Osenberg (USA)
  - (United States) Michael Andriaccio (USA)
  - (United States) Joanne Castellani (USA)
- 2012
  - Berta Rojas (Paraguay)
  - Eduardo Fernández (Uruguay)
  - Ricardo Iznaola (Venezuela)
  - (United States) Adam Holzman (USA)
  - (United States) Tony Morris (USA)
  - (United States) Michael Andriaccio (USA)
  - (United States) Joanne Castellani (USA)
- 2010
  - Ernesto Cordero (Puerto Rico)
  - Micaela Pittaluga (Italy)
  - Ernesto Bitetti (Argentina)
  - (United States) Michael Colina (USA)
  - (United States) Laura Oltman (USA)
  - (United States) Michael Andriaccio (USA)
  - (United States) Joanne Castellani (USA)
- 2008
  - Eduardo Fernandez (Uruguay)
  - Enrique Muñoz Teruel (Spain)
  - (United States) Brian Head (USA)
  - (United States) David Leisner (USA)
  - (United States) Tony Morris (USA)
  - (United States) Michael Andriaccio (USA)
  - (United States) Joanne Castellani (USA)
- 2006
  - Marcin Dylla (Poland)
  - Eduardo Pascual Diez (Spain)
  - (United States) Miguel del Águila (USA)
  - (United States) David Frost (USA)
  - (United States) Jeff Cogan (USA)
  - (United States) John Landis (USA)
  - (United States) David Dusman (USA)
  - (United States) Michael Andriaccio (USA)
  - (United States) Joanne Castellani (USA)
- 2004
  - Jack Behrens (Canada)
  - (United Kingdom) Carlos Bonell (UK)
  - (United States) Roberto Sierra (USA)
  - (United States) Bruce Holzman (USA)
  - (United States) John Landis (USA)
  - (United States) David Dusman (USA)
  - (United States) Michael Andriaccio (USA)
  - (United States) Joanne Castellani (USA)
