= List of compositions by Leo Brouwer =

This is a list of compositions by Leo Brouwer. Given the prominence of the instrument in Brouwer's oeuvre, his works for guitar solo, guitar ensembles, as well as guitar concertos, are all placed in a separate category. However, pieces which include guitar as part of a mixed ensemble, and ones for guitar and tape, are placed into the chamber music category.

== Works for guitar ==
=== Solo guitar ===
- 1955 Suite No. 1 Antigua
- 1955 Suite No. 2
- 1956 Preludio
- 1957 Danza Característica "Quítate de la Acera"
- 1956 Dos temas populares cubanos

- Canción de cuna (Berceuse), after Drume negrita by Emilio Grenet
- Ojos Brujos, after a criolla by Gonzalo Roig

- 1956 Piezas sin títulos I–II
- 1956/2023 Sonatina Campestre
- 1959 Fuga No. 1
- 1959 Tres Apuntes

- Del "Homenaje a Falla"
- De Un Fragmento Instrumental
- Sobre un Canto de Bulgaria

- 1959 Three Pieces by J. S. Bach, transcription
- 1962 Dos aires populares cubanos

- Guajira criolla
- Zapateo cubano (Zapateado)

- 1962 Pieza sin título III
- 1962 Tres piezas latinoamericanas

- Danza del Altiplano
- Canción Triste (after Carlos Guastavino)
- Tango (after Astor Piazzolla)

- 1964 Elogio de la Danza
- 1964 Twelve Sonatas by Domenico Scarlatti, transcription
- 1968 Canticum

- Eclosion
- Ditirambo

- 1968 Un Dia de Noviembre
- 1970 Memorias de "El Cimarrón", free arranged from Hans Werner Henze's work
- 1971 La Espiral Eterna
- 1972 Estudios Sencillos (Nos. 1–10)
- 1972 Pieza sin título No. 4
- 1973 Parábola
- 1974 Tarantos
- 1975 Cadences
- 1981 El Decamerón Negro (dedicated to Sharon Isbin)
- 1981 Preludios Epigramáticos No. 1–6
- 1981 The Young Sprout, arranged from Minoru Miki's music for In the Realm of the Senses
- 1983 Estudios Sencillos (Nos. 11–20)
- 1984 Variations on a Theme of Django Reinhardt
- 1986 Paisaje Cubano con Campanas
- 1990 Sonata (dedicated to Julian Bream)
- 1993 Rito de los Orishás
- 1996 Hika: In Memoriam Toru Takemitsu
- 1996 Hoja de album
- 1996 Paisaje Cubano con Tristeza
- 1999 An Idea (Passacaglia por Eli)
- 2000 Viaje a la Semilla
- 2001 Nuevos Estudios Sencillos No. 1–10
- 2004 La Ciudad De Las Columnas (Variaciones sobre "Pieza sin Título Nº1")
- 2005 El Arpa y la sombra, Omaggio a Toru Takemitsu
- 2007 Cantilena de los bosques (dedicated to Roberto Fabbri)
- 2007 Paisaje Cubano con Fiesta
- 2007 Variaciones Sobre un Tema de Víctor Jara
- 2007 Sonata Nº 2 "del Caminante" (dedicated to Odair Assad)
- 2012 Sonata Nº 3 "del Decamerón Negro" (dedicated to Costas Cotsiolis)
- 2012 Danzas Rituales y Festivas
- 2013 Sonata Nº 4 "del Pensador" (dedicated to Ricardo Gallén)
- 2013 Sonata Nº 5 "Ars Combinatoria"
- 2013 Preludio de las campanas
- 2017 Danza de los Bosques
- 2017 Las Cíclades Arcaicas
- 2018 Danza de Medianoche (dedicated to Virginia Luque)
- 2018 La Gran Sarabanda
- 2018 Sonata Nº 6 "de los Enigmas"(dedicated to Muraji Kaori)
- 2019 Los Guardianes de la Magia (dedicated to João Luiz Rezende)
- 2020 To the Man in the Mirror (dedicated to Keith Calmes)
- 2020 Beatlerianas
- 2020 Dorian, it is too late, in memoriam Oscar Wilde
- 2020 Diálogo del Olivo y el Nuraga
- 2020 Preludio de la nostalgia
- 2020 Fábula del unicornio azul
- 2021 Motivos de Son No. 1–3
- 2021 Loreley's Solitude, for guitar left hand
- 2021 El juego de los abalorios
- 2021 Palma sola
- 2021 Sonata Nº 7 “Cubana” (dedicated to João Luiz Rezende)
- 2022 Relieves
- 2022 Sonata Nº 8 “Homo Ludens” (dedicated to Deion Cho)
- 2023 Sonata para Alejo Carpentier
- 2023 Sonata Nº 9 “de Los Pasos Perdidos” (dedicated to Andrés Madariaga)

=== Guitar duo ===
- 1957–58 Micro piezas I–IV – Hommage à Darius Milhaud
- 1958 Micropieza V
- 1958 Tríptico
- 1973 Per Suonare a Due
- 1978 Música incidental campesina
- 2009 Sonata de Los Viajeros
- 1976-2010 Beatlerianas
- 2018 El Libro de los Seres Imaginarios (Dedicated to Newman & Oltman Guitar Duo)
- 2019 Hoja de Álbum, in memoriam a Roberto Matta
- 2020 Trois Nouvelles Études

=== Guitar quartet ===
- Canciones remotas
- Toccata para cuatro o más guitarras
- Toccata
- 1984 Paisaje Cubano con lluvia
- 1985 Paisaje Cubano Con Rumba
- Acerca del Cielo, el Aire y la Sonrisa (guitar quartet/guitar orchestra)
- Concerto Grosso
- Concerto de Tricastin
- 2020 Irish Landscape with Rain
- 2020 Beatlerianas, for guitar orchestra

=== Guitar and string quartet ===
- 1958 Quintet for guitar and string quartet

=== Guitar & orchestra ===
- 1958 Tres danzas concertantes, for guitar and string orchestra
- 1979 Acerca del cielo, el aire y la sonrisa
- 1983 Retrats Catalans
- 1986 Beatlerianas, for guitar and string orchestra (originally titled From Yesterday to Penny Lane)
- 1993 Suite Iberia, arranged from Isaac Albéniz's work
- 1995 Concierto Omaggio a Paganini (concerto for guitar and violin)
- 2004 Gismontiana, for guitar quartet and string orchestra

==== Guitar concertos ====
- 1972 Concierto num. 1
- 1981 Concierto num. 2 "de Lieja"
- 1986 Concierto num. 3 "Elegiaco"
- 1987 Concierto num. 4 "de Toronto"
- 1991–92 Concierto num. 5 "de Helsinki"
- 1997 Concierto num. 6 "de Volos"
- 1998 Concierto num. 7 "de La Habana"
- 1999 Concierto num. 8 "Concierto Cantata de Perugia" (for chorus, guitar, and orchestra)
- 2002 Concierto num. 9 "de Benicassim"
- 2003 Concierto num. 10 "Book of Signs" (for two guitars)
- 2007 Concierto num. 11 "de Requiem (In memoriam Toru Takemitsu)"
- 2016 Concierto num. 12 "Austral"

== Other works ==
=== Orchestral ===
- 1964 Sonograma II
- 1965 Arioso (Homenaje a Charles Mingus), for jazz combo and orchestra
- 1967 Tropos
- 1967–69 La tradición se rompe..., pero cuesta trabajo
- 1970 Exaedros III, for percussionist and 2 orchestral groups
- 1972 Balada, concierto para flauta y orquesta de cuerdas, for flute and orchestra)
- 1972 Concierto para violín y orquesta, for violin and orchestra
- 1972 Controversia (Sonograma IV)
- 1972 El gran zoo (Guillén), for narrator, horn solo, and orchestra
- 1964 Sonograma IV, for two orchestral groups
- 1977 Anima Latina (Madrigali guerrieri ed amorosi)
- 1979–81 Canción de gesta, for percussion and wind orchestra
- 1983 La guerra de las galaxias, orchestral suite on themes by John Williams
- 1984 Canciones remotas, for string orchestra
- 1992 Wagneriana, for string orchestra
- 1996 Lamento por Rafael Orozco, for clarinet and string orchestra
- 2001 La Danza Imposible, for strings and percussion

=== Vocal ===
- 1959 Dos Canciones, for medium voice and guitar
- 1960 Elegía a Jesús Menéndez, for chorus and orchestra
- 1961 Son Mercedes, for mixed chorus
- 1964 Canciones Amatorias, for mixed chorus
- 1969 Cantigas del tiempo nuevo, for children's chorus, actors, and ensemble
- 1970 Cantos yorubá, for baritone, flute, cello, percussion, and piano
- 1973 Es el Amor quien ve..., for high voice and ensemble
- 1975 Cantata de Chile, for male chorus and orchestra
- 2000 Cantico de Celébración, for mixed chorus
- 2004 Rondas, refranes y trabalenguas, for mixed chorus
- 2011 Canciones Amatorias, for voice and guitar
- 2015 English Folk Songs, for voice and lute

=== Chamber and solo instrumental ===
==== Piano trios ====
- 1983 Manuscrito antiguo encontrado en una botella
- 1992 Sonata, sones y danzones
- 2000–2007 Cuadros de otra exposición
- 2007 El triángulo de las Bermudas
- 2011 El Oráculo de Ifá

==== String quartets ====
- 1961 Cuarteto de cuerdas num. 1 – a la memoria de Bela Bártok
- 1968 Cuarteto de cuerdas num. 2 – Rem tene verba sequentur
- 1991–97 Cuarteto de cuerdas num. 3

==== Other chamber ====
- 1956 Trío para dos violines y viola
- 1957 Finale, for guitar and string quartet
- 1957 Homenaje a Manuel de Falla, for flute, oboe, clarinet, and guitar
- 1959 Dos bocetos, for piano solo
- 1959 Música, ballet scene for dancer, guitar, piano, and percussion
- 1960 Fuga cervantina, for piano solo
- 1960 Sonata para flauta sola
- 1960/1994 Sonata para cello solo
- 1960/2008 Sonata para viola, for solo viola
- 1961 Fanfarria de celebración, for flute solo
- 1962 Variantes, for a percussionist
- 1963 Sonograma I, for prepared piano
- 1964 Trio No. 2, for oboe, clarinet, and bassoon
- 1965 Dos Conceptos del Tiempo, for ensemble
- 1966 Conmutaciones, for percussion (2 players) and prepared piano
- 1968 El reino de este mundo, for wind quintet
- 1968 Epigramas, for violin and piano (or cello and piano)
- 1969 Exaedros I–II, for 6 instruments or any multiple of 6 instruments
- 1970 Per suonare a Tre, for flute, viola, and guitar
- 1970 Sonata piane forte, for piano and tape
- 1970 Varias maneras de hacer música con papel, for three or four groups of musicians
- 1972 Basso Continuo I, for clarinet and tape, or 2 clarinets
- 1972 Ludus metalicus, for saxophone quartet
- 1974 Metáforas del amor, for guitar and tape
- 1974 Música para tres pianos, for three pianos
- 1974 Oda a la alegría, for guitar, piano, and percussion
- 1980 Sonograma III, for two pianos
- 1982 La región más transparente, for flute and piano
- 1985 Los negros brujos se divierten, for ensemble
- 1989 Paisaje cubano con ritual, for bass clarinet and percussion
- 1990 Divertimento (minuetto mozartiano), for two flutes, timpani, and strings
- 1997 Paisajes, retratos y mujeres, for flute, viola, and guitar
- 1999 La Vida Misma, for piano, violin, cello, and percussion
- 1999 Los pasos perdidos, for double bass and percussion
- 2001 Cuadros de otra exposición, for horn, violin and piano
- 2008 Sonata para violín, for solo violin
- 2009 Mitología de las Aguas (Sonata No. 1 for flute and guitar)
- 2009 Diez Bocetos, for piano
- 2011 Sonata para Bandurria
- 2011 Sonata de los Misterios, for archlute, transcribed as Sonata de los Enigmas for guitar by Ricardo Gallén in 2018
- 2012 Elegía por Cintio Vitier, for flute and guitar
- 2017 Diálogos de la Isla y el Mar, for cello and guitar
- 2018 Lorquianas, for cello and guitar
- 2019 Guerra del Tiempo, for guitar and piano
- 2021 In Praise of Folly (after Erasmus of Rotterdam), for recorder
- 2021 Perpetuum mobile, for clarinet and guitar
- 2022 Isla de rojo coral, for violin and guitar

=== Film scores ===
- 1960: Historias de la revolución
- 1965: Vaqueros del cauto
- 1966: Papeles son papeles
- 1966: La muerte de un burócrata
- 1967: Las aventuras de Juan Quin Quin
- 1968: LBJ
- 1968: Hanoi, martes 13
- 1968: Memorias del subdesarrollo
- 1968: Lucía
- 1969: Despegue a las 18:00
- 1971: La bataille des dix millions
- 1972: Una pelea cubana contra los demonios
- 1973: El extraño caso de Rachel K
- 1973: El hombre de Maisinicú
- 1975: Abril de Vietnam en el año del gato
- 1975: Ustedes tienen la palabra
- 1976: Un día de noviembre
- 1976: La cantata de Chile
- 1976: La última cena
- 1977: Mi hermano Fidel
- 1977: Destino manifiesto
- 1978: Son o no son
- 1978: El recurso del método
- 1979: No hay sábado sin sol
- 1979: The survivors (Los sobrevivientes)
- 1979: La viuda de Montiel
- 1980: La guerra necesaria
- 1982: Una y otra vez
- 1983: Tiempo de amar
- 1983: Los refugiados de la cueva del muerto
- 1983: Alsino y el cóndor
- 1983: La rosa de los vientos
- 1983: Cecilia
- 1983: Hasta cierto punto
- 1984: La segunda hora de Esteban Zayas
- 1985: Cuando una mujer no duerme
- 1985: Wild Dogs (Jíbaro)
- 1985: Amada – a woman from Havanna
- 1986: Tiempo de morir
- 1992: Like Water for Chocolate (film)
- 1995: Un héroe se hace a patadas
- 1998: Mátame mucho
- 2002: Ficción sin ficción
- 2003: Memorias de Lucía
- 2004: Lucía y el tiempo
- 2004: La persistencia de la memoria
- 2005: Kordavision
