= Nikolay Sivchuk =

Russian bayanist/accordionist

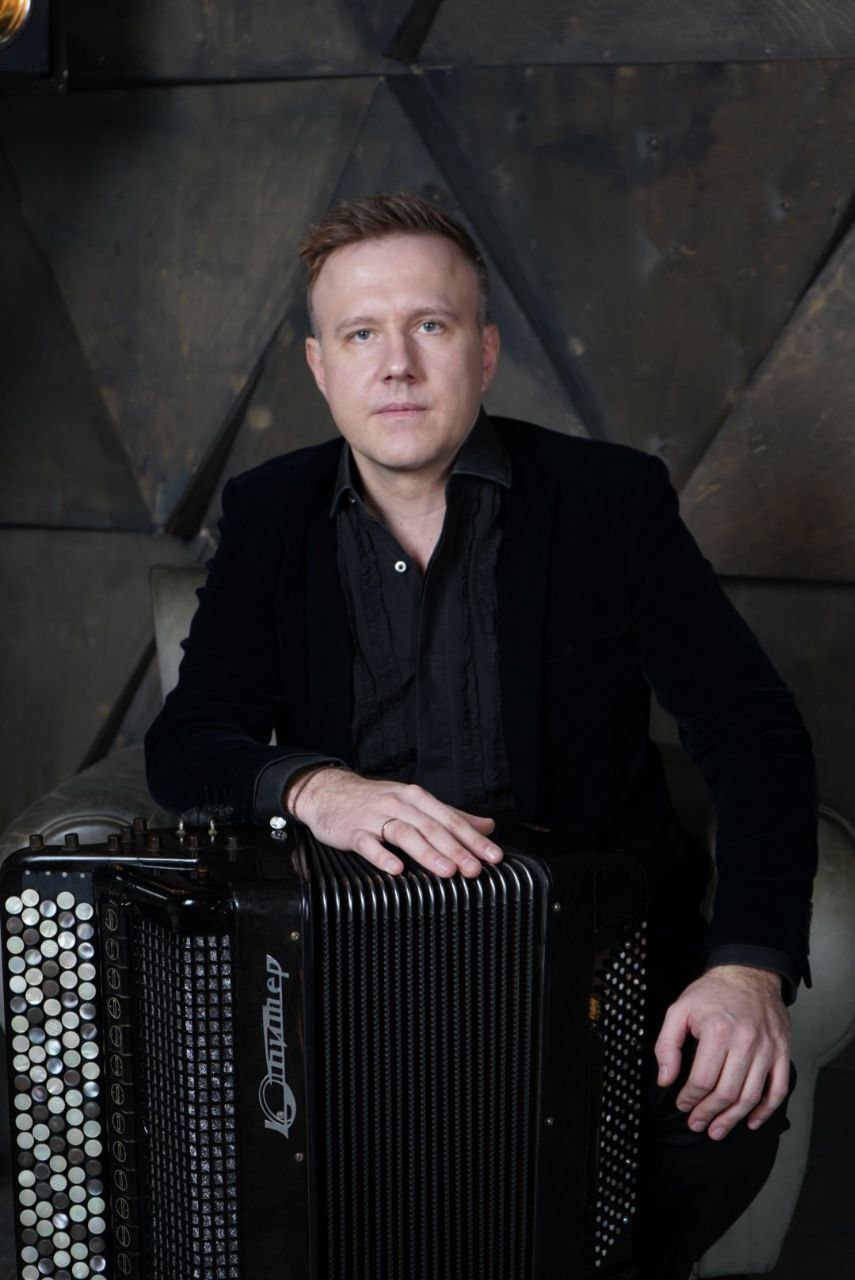

Background information
- Born: July 23, 1981; Surgut, Russia
- Genres: Classical
- Instruments: bayan

Nikolay Sivchuk (Russian: Николай Сивчук; born July 23, 1981, in Surgut) is a Russian bayanist/accordionist. He works as a soloist, chamber musician, arranger, teacher and composer.

== Biography ==
In 1995 Nikolay Sivchuk got a scholarship at the "New Names" Charitable Public Foundation, the project which is supporting the young talents and providing them with the masterclasses by famous Russian musicians. There he met the professor Viacheslav Semionov, whose class at Gnessins' Russian Academy of Music in Moscow he attended in 2000.

In 2002 as a part of "Yugoria" duo (Alexey Peresidly and Nikolay Sivchuk) recorded an album «Light and Shadows» at Mosfilm Records studio.

In 2003, he won the Coupe Mondiale (World Cup) World Accordion Championship in the "Academic button accordion" category. Since then Nikolay developed an extensive worldwide solo career. Sivchuk was touring throughout Russia, Germany, France, Italy, Spain, Cyprus, Finland, Denmark, Serbia, Hungary, Portugal, China.

In 2021, Sivchuk performed his composition "Mountain Lullaby" on 2021 Mendeleev UNESCO Russia Award Ceremony in Paris.

Nikolay Sivchuk is a teacher at the "New Names" Charitable Public Foundation, every year he is giving masterclasses in different cities of Russia and at the "Creative Summer School", he acts as a member of the jury of different competitions, and performs at the «Stars Generations», «Vivacello», «Musical Expedition», «Vivarte», «Baikal Stars», FRAUCHI and other festivals, and often takes part in charity concerts. He acts as a curator and a "big star" at the «Big and Small Stars» children's festival.

== Awards ==
Nikolay Sivchuk is a winner of the major international bayan and accordion competitions:

- 1998 – "Baltica Harmonica" International Competition and Festival, Saint Petersburg – I prize (solo)
- 1999 – First All-Russian Youth Delphic Games, city of Saratov – gold medal (solo)
- 2000 – International Competition named after V. V. Andreyev, Saint Petersburg – II prize (solo)
- 2001 – I All-Russian Open Competition of bayanists and accordionists «Yugoria», city of Surgut – I prize (as a part of «Yugoria» duo), II prize (solo)
- 2002 – XXXIX Internationaler Akkordeonwetttbewerb Klingental Competition, Germany – I prize (as a part of «Yugoria» duo)
- 2003 – Coupe Mondiale International Accordionists Competition, Slovak-Hungary – I prize (solo)
- 2005 – XLII Internationaler Akkordeonwetttbewerb Klingental Competition, Germany – III prize (solo)
- 2006 – Shanghai Spring International Competition, China – Grand Prix (as a part of «Yugoria» duo)

== Select collaborations ==
Sivchuk performs at the main Russian venues including Zaryadye Hall, Tchaikovsky Concert Hall, Great Hall of the Moscow Conservatory, most of the Russian Philharmonics halls, he plays with the leading orchestras and conductors including Artyom Markin, Alim Shakhmametyev, Dmitry Vassiliev, Mikhail Leontyev, Vyacheslav Valeyev, Dmitry Filatov, Stanislav Malyshev. He played with the many prominent soloists including cellist Boris Andrianov, guitarists Dimitri Illarionov and Yamandu Costa, violinists Elena Revich and Sergei Dogadin, pianists Vadym Kholodenko, Andrey Gugnin, Rem Urasin.

== Personal life ==
Nikolay Sivchuk married Lenura Kusova in 2014. They have two kids, born 2014 (Valeria) and 2018 (German).
