= Andrey Zelenskiy =

Russian composer

- Born: 24 January 1963; Blagoveshchensk, USSR
- Era: Contemporary

Andrey Valerievich Zelenskiy (Russian: Андрей Валерьевич Зеленский, born 24 January 1963) is a Soviet-Russian composer and pianist. He is considered one of the foremost Russian contemporary classical composers of the 21st century.

== Biography ==
Zelenskiy was born in Blagoveshchensk, Russia. He studied composition and piano at the Nizhny Novgorod State Conservatory under Arcady Nesterov, graduating in 1989. Participated in composition seminars under the guidance of Sergei Berinsky and Vasily Lobanov. The compositions of Andrey Zelenskiy were performed in Moscow (in the Glinka and Prokofiev museums, the Gulag History Museum, the Jurgenson Living Room, Pushkin Museum, ZIL Cultural Center, Tchaikovsky Concert Hall, Zaryadye Hall, Moscow International House of Music, House of Composers, etc. ), Nizhny Novgorod, Yekaterinburg, Ivanovo, as well as in Germany and Japan.

Zelenskiy composes orchestral and instrumental music, music for theater and cinema as well as children's music. The album “Shoes out of the Rain” (Russian: "Туфельки из дождя", music by Andrey Zelenskiy) was released in 2021.

Zelenskiy is a member of the Union of Composers of Russia and the Union of Theater Workers.

Zelenskiy is married to the composer Lyubov Terskaya.

== Career ==
=== Compositor ===
His notable works include "Invention-Pastoral" for three guitars, "Metamorphoses" in memory of Nikolai Korndorff for chamber ensemble, string quartet "Against the backdrop of a single landscape", Sonata al test for violin solo, "Sonata in Preludes" for violin, voice and piano, “Little Joys” for vocal, saxophone, piano and various objects, “Cross and Rose” sonata for viola and guitar, “Pulsations” for violin, cello and accordion, “Patches” for four flutes, Passacaglia Blu(es) for chamber music ensemble, “Berry” to lyrics by Varlam Shalamov for reader, saxophone and piano quartet, Esmeralda — metamorphosis concert for guitar, string orchestra, percussion, two pianos and flute, Passacaglia-misterioso (quasi una sonata) for solo guitar.

Music by Andrey Zelenskiy is performed by many leading guitarists in Russia, including Dimitri Illarionov, Dmitry Murin, Vera Danilina, Rovshan Mamedkuliev and others. Zelensky's pieces were performed at the many Moscow guitar festivals including Guitar Virtuosi, GUITARMAGfest and the Frauchi Competition and Festival.

=== Performer ===
Andrey Zelenskiy took part in the contemporary music festivals “Moscow Autumn”, “Another Space”, “Creative Workshop”, “Meetings in the Province”, “Strip of Wet Sand” (Nizhny Novgorod), in the “Free Monday” project of the Moscow theater ApARTe. As a pianist, he participated in the festivals “Under Satie’s Umbrella”, “Mirror in Mirror”, “Guitar World”, “Theatrical Attraction”, in Dimitri Illarionov's projects “Dancing”, “Everything is Complicated” and “Satie’s Fiction”. Zelenskiy created a dedicated version of the “Sol-weg-Pulsation” for guitar, button accordion, piano and chamber ensemble (performed at the Moscow Planetarium, MMDM and the State Tretyakov Gallery). The “Esmeralda” metamorphosis concert for guitar, string orchestra, percussion, flute and two pianos was performed at a joint concert of the VIVACELLO festival and the VI International Alexander Frauchi Festival (performers: Dimitri Illarionov and Questa Musica ensemble under baton of Philip Chizhevsky).
