= Miroslav Tadić =

Guitarist and composer

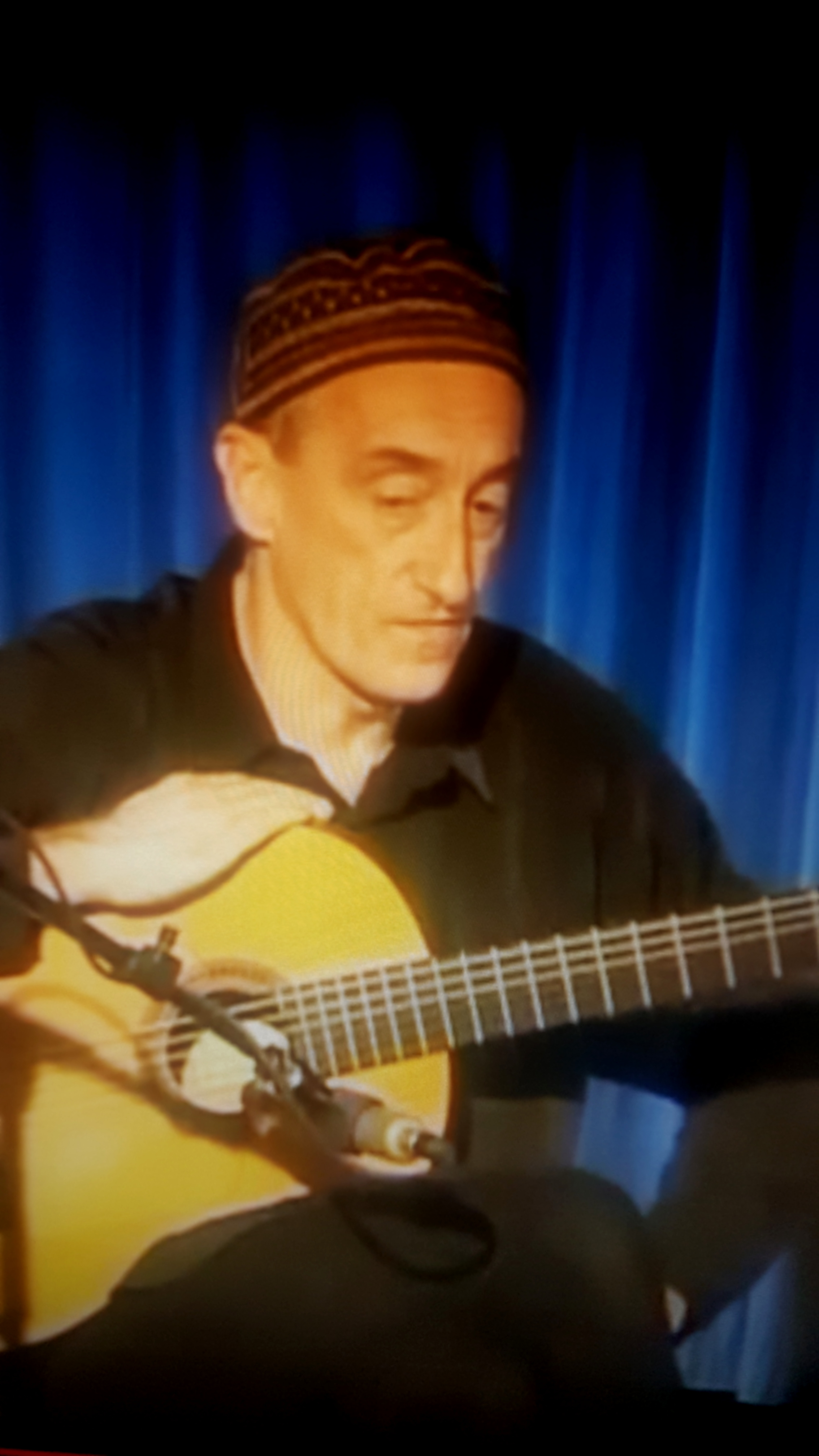
Miroslav Tadic solo performance.

Miroslav Tadić (born 1959) is a Bosnian guitarist, composer, improviser and music educator.

== Career ==
He performs regularly in Europe, Japan and the United States and made over 30 CDs for numerous labels including CMP Records, MA Recordings, Croatia Records, Enja Records, Leo Records, and Sony Classical.

In the January 1997 issue, the editors of Guitar Player magazine voted Tadić one of the world's thirty most radical and individual guitarists.

Tadić has collaborated with accordionist Merima Ključo and musician, poet and philosopher Rambo Amadeus, and composed scores for the Croatian feature film 72 Days and a documentary Dance of the Maize God. His chamber music and works for solo guitar are published by Les Éditions Doberman-Yppan.

Tadić taught guitar, improvisation, and Balkan Music at the California Institute of the Arts in Los Angeles until his retirement in 2025.

Tadić has played guitar in the Grande Mothers, together with former members of The Mothers of Invention Don Preston and Napoleon Murphy Brock.

== Discography ==
- Bracha (with John Bergamo and David Philipson) (Cmp, 1988)
- Dark: Tamna Voda (with L. Shankar, David Torn, Mark Nauseef) (Cmp, 1988)
- Let's Be Generous (with Joachim Kuehn, Tony Newton, Mark Nauseef) (Cmp, 1990)
- Levantine Tales (with Dusan Bogdanovi) (M.A., 1990)
- Window Mirror (M.A., 1991)
- Without Words (with Peter Epstein) (M.A., 1992)
- Keys to Talk By (with Dusan Bogdanovi, Mark Nauseef) (M.A., 1992)
- Snake Music (with Jack Bruce, David Torn, Mark Nauseef) (Cmp, 1994)
- The Old Country (with Howard Levy, Mark Nauseef) (M.A., 1996)
- The Jack Bruce Collector's Edition (Cmp, 1996)
- Baby Universe (with Jadranka Stojakovi) (Omagatoki, 1996)
- Still Light (with Markus Stockhausen, Mark Nauseef) (M.A., 1997)
- Loose Wires (with Michel Godard and Mark Nauseef) (Enja, 1997)
- Krushevo (with Vlatko Stefanovski) (M.A., 1998)
- Live in Belgrade (with Vlatko Stefanovski) (Third Ear, 2000)
- Cucuk (with Son of Slavster) (Ma-no, 2000)
- Lulka (with Vanja Lazarova) (Third Ear, 2003)
- Treta Majka (with Vlatko Stefanovski and Theodosii Spassov) (Avalon, 2004)
- Snakish (with Wadada Leo Smith and Mark Nauseef) (Leo, 2005)
- Pangea (with Djivan Gasparyan and Swapan Chaudhuri) (Lian, 2006)
- Imam Pjesmu Za Tebe (with Rade Serbedzija) (Croatia, 2008)
- Live in Zagreb (with Vlatko Stefanovski, Theodosii Spassov, Swapan Chaudhuri) (Croatia, 2008)
- Ponekad Dolazim, Ponekad Odlazim (with Rade ErbedIja) (Croatia, 2010)
- Migrations (with Dusan Bogdanovi) (Doberman-Yppan, 2011)
- Invisible Writing (with Single Wing Turquoise Bird) (Night Fire Films, 2011)
- Vidarica (with Teofilovi Brothers) (Nine Winds, 2012)
- Mirina (Croatia, 2013)
- Balkan Fever (with Vlatko Stefanovski, Theodosii Spassov, Mdr Leipzig Symphony conducted by Kristjan Jaervi) (Naive, 2014)
- Aritmia (with Merima Ključo -Skrga music, 2016)
- Spavati, mozda sanjati (2017)
- Luka (with Yvette Holzwarth) (Croatia, 2021)
