= International classical guitar competitions =

International classical guitar competitions are public events designed to identify and award outstanding classical guitar soloists, ensembles, and composers. They allow artists to promote themselves and gain exposure. Some competitions also have newly composed "set" pieces which serve to increase the classical guitar repertoire.

== Early history ==
The guitar seems to be the absentee in musical competitions until the Second World War.

- In 1949 the "First Guitar Competition", now the Tokyo International Guitar Competition was held and the Modern Japan Guitar Federation was established in Tokyo, Japan. It was not held in 1954, 1955, and 1956, but continued from the 6th edition since 1957. From the 25th edition in 1982 became the Tokyo International Guitar Competition.
- The first international guitar performance competitions in Europe were promoted and initiated in the 1950s by virtuoso Spanish guitarist Andrés Segovia. In 1956 he managed to get the guitar discipline to be included in prestigious multi-instrumental Geneva International Music Competition.
- The 1960s led to born within the compass of Segovia two European competitions that marked the history of guitar and which remains active until today, i.e. 1967 - International Guitar Competition "Francisco Tárrega" in Benicàssim, Spain and 1968 - Competition "Premio Città di Alessandria" in Alessandria, Italy, which in 1995 would be renamed International Classical Guitar Competition "Michele Pittaluga - Premio Città di Alessandria" on the occasion of its founder passing. Over time, Segovia kept promoting competitions by giving his support to ones which had evident professionalism contents.
- Between 1959 and 1990s the Concours International de Guitare was organized by O.R.T.F., which then became Radio France. The competition was born at the behest of Robert J. Vidal, deputy producer of the French radio station. In 2007 a new competition, International Classical Guitar Competition Robert J. Vidal in Barbezieux, France was established in his memory.
- In 1972 Giuliano Balestra founded International Guitar Competition "Fernando Sor" in Rome, Italy
- Since 1973 the city of Gargnano, Italy has been hosting the "Incontri Chitarristici" which included the International Classical Guitar Competition, since 1976.
- In 1982 the Guitar Foundation of America International Concert Artist Competition was established and shortly became one of the most desired awards in the classical guitar world thus given a start to classical guitar popularisation in the US.
- In 1985, the European Year of Music, Andrés Segovia International Classical Guitar Competition was established in La Herradura, Spain in the honor of maestro.

== Present times ==
In recent years, many international classical guitar competitions were established.

- The overall level of the competitions was raised by increasing prizes value up to $30,000 in the US, $22,000 in Europe, and $10,000 in Asia.
- Finals with the orchestra became more common.
- Introduction of online streaming of the competition rounds and YouTube applications greatly improved neutrality and public reception of the judgment.
- Many classical guitar competitions now take place during guitar festivals, and therefore the competition event can be attended by the general public, as an audience.
- Youth international competitions became more popular, attracting children and amateurs by the lower comp level and affordable prizes.

== Competitors ==
- In the international classical guitar competitions, the typical age of the competitors is from 18 to 35. Some competitions don't have age restrictions.
- The youth competitions are usually up to 25 years old.
- As a result of an increased number of competitions, some competitors have won unusual (more than 15) number of 1st Prizes in the professional (adult) competitions: 19 - Marcin Dylla, 19 - Goran Krivokapić, 55 - Marko Topchii.

== List of international competitions for classical guitar ==
=== US and Americas ===
Competition Name	Town	Country	Last year active	1st prize cash, USD
Parkening International Guitar Competition	Malibu, CA	USA	2019	30,000
Baltimore International Guitar Competition	Baltimore, MD	USA	2022	35,000 ($20,000 Cash Award & $15,000 Augustine Career Cash Award)
JoAnn Falletta International Guitar Concerto Competition (biennial)	Buffalo, New York	USA	2020	12,500
International Guitar Competition Maurizio Biasini (biennial)	Bologna, Basel, San Francisco, Paris	Italy, Switzerland, France and USA	2024	12,000
Guitar Foundation of America International Concert Artist Competition (ICAC)	New every year	USA	2025	10,000
Dr. Luis Sigall International Music Competition (Guitar every 5 years)	Viña del Mar	Chile	2017	10,000
Miami International GuitART Festival and Concert Artist Performance Competition	Miami, FL	USA	2018	5,000
University of Rhode Island Rising Stars International Guitar Competition	Kingston, RI	USA	2024	5,000
Wilson Center Guitar Competition & Festival	Wisconsin	USA	2019	5,000
Festival y Concurso Internacional de Guitarra de la Habana (biennial)	Havana	Cuba	2018	5,000
Culiacan International Guitar Competition	Culiacán, Sinaloa	Mexico	2020	4,000
Indiana International Guitar Festival & Competition	Bloomington, IN	USA	2019	4,000
Texas International Guitar Festival and Competition	Dallas, TX	USA	2020	3,000
Guitar Symposium & Competition	Columbus, GA	USA	2020	2,000
LASP Classical Guitar Festival & Youth Competition	Milwaukee, WI	USA	2022	500

=== Europe ===
Competition Name	Town	Country	Last year active	1st prize cash, USD
Tampere Guitar Festival	Tampere	Finland	2023	none
Alhambra International Guitar Competition	Valencia	Spain	2018	18140 (€14,000)
Frauchi International Competition (biennial: odd years)	Moscow	Russia	2021	16197 (€12,500)
2nd European Bach Guitar award	Darmstadt	Germany	2025	15549 (€12,000)
Francisco Tárrega International Guitar Competition	Benicàssim	Spain	2021	15549 (€12,000)
International Guitar Competition Maurizio Biasini (biennial)	Bologna, Basel, San Francisco, Paris	Italy, Switzerland, France and USA	2024	15549 (€12,000)
Michele Pittaluga International Classical Guitar Competition	Alessandria	Italy	2018	12957 (€10,000)
International Classical Guitar Competition Robert J. Vidal	Barbezieux	France	2016	12957 (€10,000)
Andrés Segovia International Guitar Competition	Almuñecar	Spain	2024	12957 (€10,000)
Miquel Llobet International Guitar Competition	Barcelona	Spain	2022	7127 (€5,000)
Paganini Guitar Festival Competition	Parma	Italy	2023	2760 (€2,000)
European Bach Guitar award	Darmstadt	Germany	2022	11780 (€8,000)
Viseu International Guitar Competition (biennial: even years)	Viseu	Portugal	2018	10366 (€8,000)
Concurso Internacional de Guitarra Clásica Gredos San Diego	Madrid	Spain	2018	6479 (€5,000)
Budapest International Guitar Competition & Festival	Budapest	Hungary	2017	6479 (€5,000)
Silesian Guitar Autumn, Jan Edmund Jurkowski Memorial Guitar Competition	Tychy	Poland	2018	5181 (20,000zł)
Incontri Chitarristici di Gargnano - Concorso Internazionale	Gargnano	Italy	2019	5442 (€4,200)
Liechtenstein Guitar Festival ligita, International ligita Guitar Competition	Eschen	Liechtenstein	2018	5183 (€4,000)
International Guitar Competition "Ruggero Chiesa - Città di Camogli" (biennial: even years)	Camogli	Italy	2018	5183 (€4,000)
International Guitar Competition Heinsberg (biennial: odd years)	Heinsberg	Germany	2017	5183 (€4,000)
International Guitar Competition "Ville d'Antony"	Antony	France	2018	4535 (€3,500)
London International Guitar Competition	London	UK	2018	4276 (£3,000)
International Competition of Guitar - Mottola	Mottola	Italy	2018	3887 (€3,000)
International Guitar Competition Fernando Sor	Rome, Madrid	Italy, Spain	2018	3887 (€3,000)
Deutscher Gitarrenpreis	Darmstadt	Germany	2024	3887 (€3,000)
Linares International Guitar Competition "Andrés Segovia"	Linares	Spain	2018	3887 (€3,000)
Dutch Guitar Foundation International Guitar Concerto Competition	Groningen	Netherlands	2020	3887 (€3,000)
Koblenz International Guitar Competition	Koblenz	Germany	2018	3887 (€3,000)
Iserlohn International Guitar Competition	Villigst and Iserlohn	Germany	2021	3887 (€3,000)
International Guitar Competition Nürtingen (biennial: even years)	Nürtingen	Germany	2018	3887 (€3,000)
European Classical Guitar Competition "Enrico Mercatali"	Gorizia	Italy	2023	3239 (€2,500)
International Guitar Competition "Paris Guitar Foundation"	Paris	France	2019	3239 (€2,500)
Zagreb Guitar Festival and International Guitar Competition	Zagreb	Croatia	2017	3239 (€2,500)
Twents Gitaar Festival	Enschede	Netherlands	2018	1296 (€1,000)
Bale-Valle Guitar Competition	Bale-Valle	Croatia	2022	1136 (€1,000)
Transilvania International Classical Guitar Competition	Cluj-Napoca	Romania	2023	1296 (€1,000)
Sarajevo International Guitar Festival	Sarajevo	Bosnia and Herzegovina	2018	none
Volos international Guitar festival & competition	Volos		2017	none
International Guitar Competition Berlin	Berlin	Germany	2018	none

=== Asia, Australia, and Oceania ===
Competition Name	Town	Country	Last year active	1st prize cash, USD
Qingdao International Guitar Art Festival and Competition	Qingdao	China	2019	15504 (CN¥ 100,000)
Daejeon International Guitar Competition	Daejeon	South Korea	2017	10000
International Guitar Festival China Changsha	Changsha	China	2018	10000
Tokyo International Guitar Competition	Tokyo	Japan	2018	9112 (¥1,000,000)
Taiwan International Guitar Festival & Competition	Taipei	Taiwan	2018	8000
Adelaide Guitar Festival and International Classical Guitar Competition	Adelaide	Australia	2018	7519 (A$10,000)
Altamira International Virtual Guitar Competition	Hong Kong	China	2021	6500
Singapore international Guitar Festival and Competition	Singapore	Singapore	2016	2000
Asia International Guitar Festival & Competition	Bangkok	Thailand	2018	none
Saigon International Guitar Festival	Ho Chi Minh	Viet Nam	2024	none

=== Youth and Discontinued ===
- Discontinued (inactive)

Competition Name	Town	Country	Last year active
Guitar Masters International Guitar Competition & Festival	Wrocław	Poland	2016
International Classical Guitar Competition Stefano Strata - città di Pisa	Pisa	Italy	2015
Calcutta International Classical Guitar Festival & Competition	Kolkata	India	2014
World Guitar Competition	Novi Sad	Serbia	2013
International Guitar Competition Rene Bartoli	Aix-en-Provence	France	2006
International Guitar Competition Mauro Giuliani	Bari	Italy	2004

- Youth (junior) competitions

Competition Name	Town	Country	Last year active
LASP Classical Guitar Festival & Youth Competition	Milwaukee	USA	2022
International competition for young guitarists	Gauting	Germany	2016
Gevelsberg Guitar Competition	Gevelsberg	Germany	2016
International Competition for Young Guitarists «Andrés Segovia»	Monheim am Rhein	Germany	2024
Terra Siculorum International Classical Guitar Festival and Competition	Odorheiu Secuiesc	Romania	
Transilvania Youth Guitar Competition	Cluj-Napoca	Romania	2023
Vojvodina Guitar Fest International classical guitar competition	Novi Sad	Serbia	2018

== Thoughts on competitions ==
- Denis Azabagić has written: "Competitions give you a very valuable experience. Do they guide in your artistic development? I do not know if it benefits the guitarist in that area, but I think it does benefit the student because it helps him to set goals under pressure (having a deadline). This creates a great deal of stress, which you will have to learn how to deal with. To perform live in front of a jury is something that requires some training. Finally, if you are successful at winning competitions, this will help you to promote your name in the guitar circle, you will start to be noticed. I think winning competitions helps you build a name but does not help much to develop your artistry."
- In this interview recorded in early 2002, Azabagic stresses that while competitions were very good to him, competitions can also be devastating to worthy musicians who never seem to win.
- John Williams has said: "[...] basically I don't like or approve of competitions on any instrument. I don't think music can be evaluated like a race - I know that's an obvious thing to say and that there are many ifs and buts involved because they do help some artists and concentrate the public's attention on music. But I particularly don't like the way many guitar competitions are run, the confusing waypoints are awarded differently in each round of a competition, and especially the over-exploitation of the "Big Winner" and the competitive values that puts on players and the activity of guitar playing itself. Winning is a matter of taste in most cases, and there are often many other equally deserving competitors other than just the First Prize recipient. I feel it would be fairer to have a select group of finalists, each of whom receives the same award and status.
  I have served on juries in the past, but these days I refuse to take part, and I feel it is important to take that stand otherwise your reservations have no meaning. Having said all that, I know it happens anyway and sometimes there is sponsorship involved which does help the general public interest and support. But it still doesn't need to be a cut and dried thing, where each finalist is ranked as precisely as 1,2,3. I think it is those competitive values that are wrong, not the celebration of excellence in music as such. I have talked about the idea of setting up a competition where this other approach is used, but nothing definite has emerged from it yet; it may take some time to develop."

Analysis of data at a piano competition, with many high-level participants, has made it doubtful that judges are able to make fully objective judgments; because there was a small correlation between the order of appearance of participants and their ranking:

- We find that the order and timing of appearance at the competition are good predictors of the final ranking. [...] Because of this, order and timing are unique instrumental variables for the final ranking, which we consistently find to have a significant impact on later success, irrespective of the finalists' true quality. Pianists with high scores are more likely to see their work recorded later on. It is also worth pointing out that the opinion of music critics is more influenced by the ranking than by the quality of the performers. This is not necessarily surprising, since there are many musicians who may have been good during the competition, but have vanished afterward, leaving the critics recollections unaffected.
  The conclusion that it pays to do well in the competition is strongly supported by the data. However, the fact that judges' rankings are affected by order and timing of appearance in a competition needs to be stressed, and sheds some doubt on their ability to cast fully objective judgments.

On the other hand, if a competition has many professional-level artistic participants, it may not even be possible to make an objective judgment of who is "best"; because: given numerous professional-level artistic performers, there may not even be room for the concept of comparison; since this presumes the existence of a "best" interpretation, which is itself questionable (and would be a commercialization of art; viewing it from a mass-consumption or absolutist point of view).

== Bibliography ==
- On Competitions - Dealing with Performance Stress by Denis Azabagic
