= Newman & Oltman Guitar Duo =

American classical guitar duo

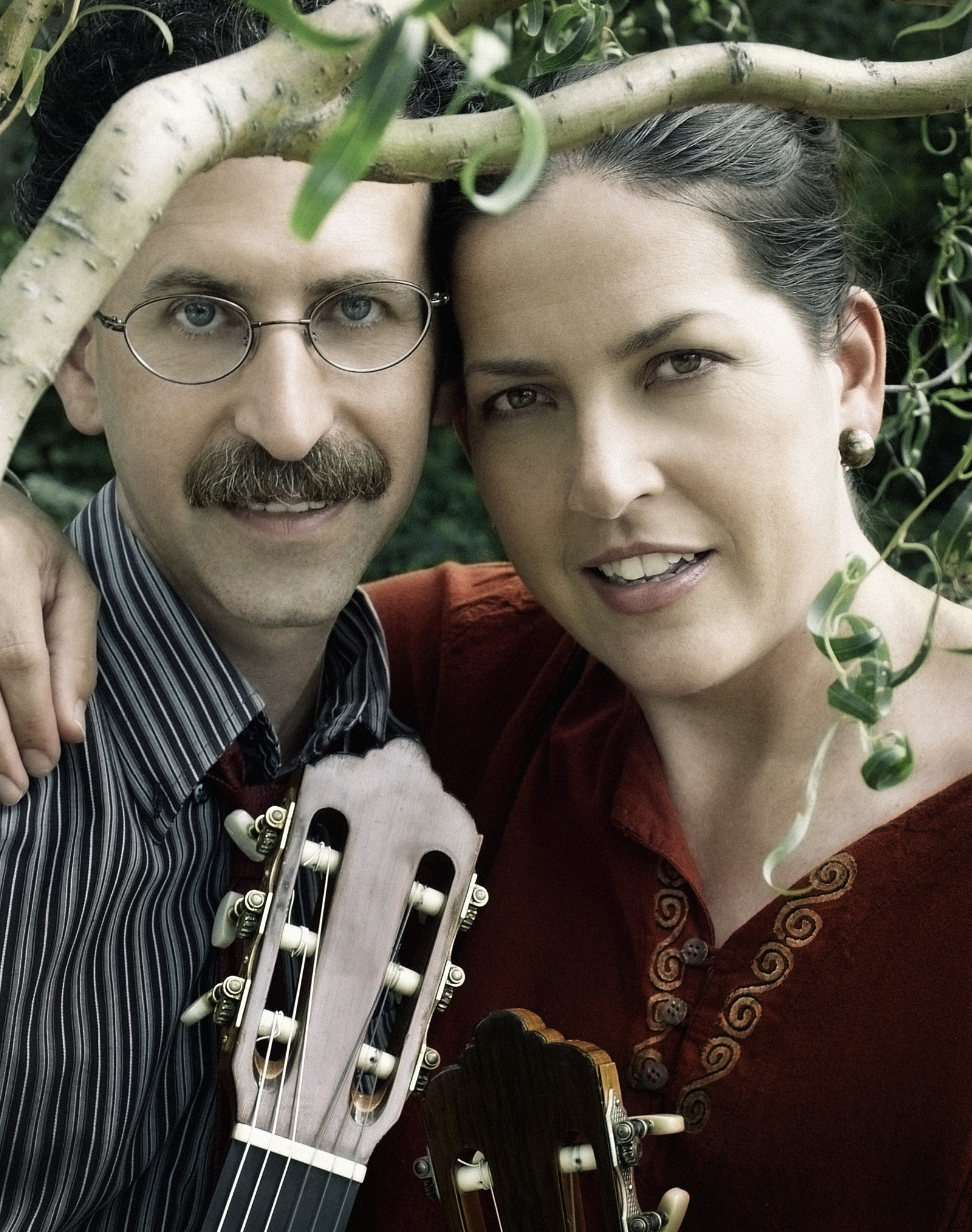
- Michael Newman and Laura Oltman

Background information
- Origin: New York City, United States
- Genres: Classical; tango; baroque; spanish
- Occupation: Musicians
- Instrument: classical guitar
- Years active: 1978 to present
- Labels: MSR Classics, Music Masters/BMG, Sheffield Lab
- Members: Michael Newman; Laura Oltman
- Website: www.guitarduo.com

The Newman & Oltman Guitar Duo (The Duo) is an American classical guitar ensemble formed in 1978. Known for adventurous programming and collaborations as well as their contributions to the repertoire of the guitar duo ensemble, the Duo was founded by Michael Newman and Laura Oltman, who have performed together since it was formed.

== Performances ==
The Duo performs and records in many styles including Classical, Tango, Baroque, Spanish and Latin American. The Duo has performed throughout the United States, Asia, Europe, Canada, South America and the Caribbean in venues that include Carnegie Hall, the Queen Mary II and the Grand Canyon Music Festival. The Duo has commissioned and performed many world premieres. Classical Guitar Magazine founder and author Maurice J. Summerfield, in his book, "The Classical Guitar: its Evolution, Players and Personalities Since 1800", credits Newman and Oltman with expanding the classical guitar repertoire. Notable collaborations include performances with:

- composer/conductor Marvin Hamlisch and the Pittsburgh Symphony Pops
- the late author Frank McCourt
- mezzo-soprano Frederica von Stade
- folk singer Sally Rogers
- violinist Tim Fain
- violinist Arnold Steinhardt
- violinist Jay Ungar
- violinist Seamus Egan
- Irish American fiddler Eileen Ivers
- Brazilian American pianist-composer Clarice Assad
- the Daedalus Quartet
- the Lark Quartet
- Turtle Island String Quartet
- the Alexander String Quartet
- ETHEL

== Festivals ==
The Newman and Oltman Guitar Duo founded Raritan River Music in 1989. Raritan River Music presents classical, world and new music throughout western New Jersey. Raritan River Music is a National Winner of the Chamber Music America/ASCAP Award for Adventurous Programming. The organization also received awards from Warren County, NJ for Diversity Achievement.

Newman and Oltman are also the founders and artistic directors of the New York Guitar Seminar at Mannes. In 2012, the couple founded the Lanciano International Guitar Seminar in Italy. They continue to serve as the artistic directors of all three festivals.

== Music Commissions for Guitar Ensemble ==
The Newman and Oltman Guitar duo founded the Raritan River New Music Commissioning Program in 1999. The mission of the Program is to support the creation and presentation of new works by American composers. Composers commissioned by the Program have included Pulitzer Prize winner Paul Moravec, Lowell Liebermann, Arnold Black, Dušan Bogdanovic, Augusta Read Thomas, Guggenheim Fellow Arthur Kampela, and Cuban composer Leo Brouwer. Works commissioned and premiered by the Duo through the New Music Commissioning Program include:

- Through the Looking Glass, (after Lewis Carroll), in memory of guitarist Julian Bream (2020) by Leo Brouwer
- El Libro de los Seres Imagniarios (in English, The Book of Imaginary Beings) (2018) by Leo Brouwer
- Concierto Buenos Aires (2011) by Nuevo Tango Master Daniel Binelli
- Motets (2011) by Arthur Kampela
- Raritan Triptych (2008) by Pulitzer Prize winner Paul Moravec
- memory: SWELLS (2005) by Augusta Reed
- Caught in the Headlights (2003) by Michael Karmon
- Nocturne-Fantasy, Op. 69 (2000) by Lowell Liebermann
- Sevdalinka (1999) by Dušan Bogdanović

Other works commissioned or premiered by the Duo include:

- Djavan's Portrait (2011) by João Luiz
- The Secret Mechanics of Luthiers and Their Impossible Guitars (2008) by Arthur Kampela
- Three Hungarian Tributes (1996) by Roberto Sierra

== Teaching Careers ==
Michael Newman currently teaches guitar and chamber music at Mannes School of Music and at The College of New Jersey. Laura Oltman teaches guitar at Princeton University and Lafayette College. The Duo was the first guitar ensemble to be appointed as an ensemble in residence by an American college when they were named ensemble-in-residence at Mannes in 1987. They have served as artists-in-residence at Cornell University, University of Puerto Rico, and Lafayette College in Pennsylvania. In 2014, The Duo served as Creative Directors for the D’Addario Performance Series at Carnegie Hall. Newman and Oltman teach master classes nation-wide and have served on guitar competition juries including the JoAnn Falletta International Guitar Concerto Competition. They presented an entrepreneurial program at a number of educational institutions including Salisbury University's Perdue School of Business in Maryland.

== Personal Lives ==
Michael Newman and Laura Oltman are married and live in a mid 19th century house they restored in Warren County, NJ. They both play Thomas Humphrey Pre-Millennium guitars (1978, 1981). Laura Oltman bought her first guitar from a Sears catalog when she was 8 years old for a neighborhood rock band with her brother. She spent much of her childhood in Fort Lauderdale, Florida. Her early guitar studies there were with Luisa Sanchez de Fuentes.

Growing up in New York, Michael Newman's father worked for the Guild Guitar Company in New York. Michael started playing classical guitar at age 7.

== Recordings ==
The Duo's recordings include:

- El Libro de los Seres Imagniarios (The Book of Imaginary Beings) by Leo Brouwer (MusicMasters)
- Laments and Dances: Music from the Folk Traditions (MusicMasters/BMG)
- Music from Raritan River: New American Music for Guitar (MSR Classics)
- Cantos de "Cantos de España: Songs of Spain (MusicMasters Classics/BMG) featuring works by Isaac Albéniz
- A Christmas Pastorale - 600 Years of Carols, Chorales, Preludes & Pastorales on Two Guitars (MusicMasters Classics/Musical Heritage Society)
- Tango Suite: Romance for Two Guitars (MusicMasters/BMG)
- A Night At The Opera: Overtures Transcribed for Two Guitars in the 19th Century (MusicMasters/BMG)
- Italian Pleasures: Music from the Golden Age of the Guitar (Sheffield Lab)
- Passions: Renaissance and Baroque Music for Two Guitars (Sheffield Lab)
- Guitar Pleasures (Sheffield Lab)

== Grants and awards ==
The Duo has received grants from the National Endowment for the Arts. In 1973, Newman won the Concert Master's Young Artist Award, and in 1978 won a prize in the International Guitar Competition in Toronto, Canada.

== Education ==
Michael Newman is a graduate of Mannes College of Music in New York where he studied with Albert Valdes Blain. Oltman graduated with honors from the College of Music at Florida State University where she studied with Bruce Holtzman. She also participated in a master class with Andres Segovia at the Metropolitan Museum of Art. Oltman and Newman studied with Oscar Ghiglia at the Aspen Music Festival and the Accademia Musicale Chigiana in Italy.

== Publications ==
- Overture to the Opera, “Il Barbiere di Siviglia”, for Two Guitars, by Giaochino Rossini, arr. by A.H. Varlet (1821), edited by Michael Newman and Laura Oltman, (1988). Theodore Presser Company.
- Overture to the Opera, “La Clemenza di Tito”, by Wolfgang Amadeus Mozart (k.621), guitar reduction by Mauro Giuliani (1812), arr. and edited by Michael Newman and Laura Oltman, (1986). Theodore Presser Company.
- Cantos de España-Songs of Spain, The Music of Isaac Albeniz for Two Guitars, arranged and transcribed for two guitars by Michael Newman and Laura Oltman (2018). Mel Bay Publications, Inc.
- A Christmas Pastorale-600 Years of Carols, Chorales, Preludes and Pastorales on Two Guitars, arranged by Michael Newman and Laura Oltman (2010). Mel Bay Publications, Inc.
- The Book of Imaginary Beings (El Libro de los Seres Imaginarios), by Leo Brouwer, revision, Laura Oltman and Michael Newman (2022). Ediciones Espiral Eterna.
