= Marko Topchii =

Marko Topchii Марко Топчій (Ukrainian)
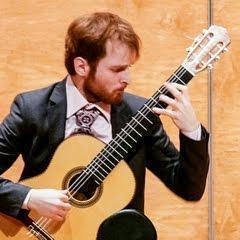
- Marko Topchii performing at the Annual Texas Guitar Competition and Festival in 2013

Background information
- Born: January 7, 1991 (age 35); Kyiv, Ukraine
- Genre: Classical
- Occupation: Classical guitarist
- Instruments: Guitar, piano, clarinet
- Years active: 2005–present
- Labels: Contrastes; Fleur de Son; Naxos
- Website: topchii.com

Marko Topchii (Ukrainian: Марко Топчій [mɐrˈkɔ topˈtʃij]; bon January 7, 1991) is a classical guitarist from Ukraine. Topchii has won more than 100 awards worldwide in the international classical guitar competitions in the professional category. Among them, 57 first places in the competitions in the United States, Mexico, Australia, Japan, China, Taiwan, Singapore, South Korea, Indonesia, Germany, Switzerland, Norway, Netherlands, France, Spain, Italy, Portugal, Liechtenstein, Luxembourg, Poland, Hungary, Serbia, Croatia, Bulgaria, Montenegro, and Ukraine.

== Early life and education ==
Marko Topchii was born in 1991 in Kyiv, Ukraine, to a family of musicians. Нe started studying the guitar at the age of four with Volodymyr Homenyuk and later with Borys Belsky.

He graduated from the Kharkiv National Kotlyarevsky University of Arts under Prof. Volodymyr Dotsenko, Merited Artist of Ukraine in 2011. In 2016, Topchii completed a three-year postgraduate program at the Petro Tchaikovsky National Music Academy of Ukraine in Kyiv under Prof. Yuri Aleksik, Merited Artist of Ukraine.

He completed the professional studies program at the San Francisco Conservatory of Music under Prof. Judicaël Perroy in 2019. Topchii entered the master soloist programme at the Geneva University of Music under Prof. Judicaёl Perroy in 2022.

== Career ==
As a multi-award-winning classical guitarist, orchestra soloist, and concertist, Marko has won over 100 awards worldwide in international classical guitar competitions in the professional category. Among them, 57 first places.

In the fall of 2018, he appeared on the cover of issue No. 391 of the Classical Guitar Magazine: Marko Topchii, Perennial Prize Winner. The issue also included the interview: Marko Topchii, Inside the World of One of the Most Successful and Widely Travelled Competitors.

In 2017, he appeared on the cover of the issue No. 12 of Polish classical guitar magazine Sześć Strun Świata (Six Strings of the World). The issue also included an interview.

Marko often performs with orchestras, having more than ten concertos for guitar and orchestra in his repertoire. He has performed at Carnegie Hall, the Salle Cortot (Paris), Yamaha Ginza Hall (Tokyo), and Tchaikovsky Hall (Moscow). Topchii was an official D'Addario artist from 2012 to 2023. Topchii is an official Augustine Strings artist since 2023.

== Awards ==
Topchii has won many awards worldwide in the international classical guitar competitions in the professional category.

To see the actual list, please look at the tables below:

Summary:
1st prizes	2nd prizes	3rd prizes	Special prizes	Total
57	26	21	25	129

=== First prizes ===
Prize	Name		Edition	Location		Year
Prize	Competition	Native	Edition	Town	Country	Year
1st	Tino Andersen International Guitar Festival Competition		1st	Bergen	Norway	2024
1st	Guitar Foundation of America International Concert Artist Competition		40th	New York, NY	US	2023
1st	Lagonegro International Guitar Festival, International Classical Guitar Competition "Premio Angelo Gilardino"	Festival Internazionale della Chitarra di Lagonegro, Concorso di Interpretazione di Musica per Chitarra del XX e XXI secolo "Premio Angelo Gilardino"	1st	Lagonegro	Italy	2023
1st	Oslo Guitar Days Guitar Competition		1st	Oslo	Norway	2023
1st	International Guitar Competition City of Lagoa - Zé Gregório	Concurso Internacional de Guitarra Cidade de Lagoa - Zé Gregório	1st	Lagoa	Portugal	2023
1st	Luxembourg Guitar Festival International Classical Guitar Competition	Le Festival de guitare de Luxembourg Concours international de guitare classique	1st	Luxembourg	Luxembourg	2022
1st	Francisco Tárrega International Guitar Competition	Certamen Internacional de Guitarra "Francisco Tarrega"	54th	Benicàssim	Spain	2021
1st	International Martinez Guitar Competition Iserlohn	Internationaler Martinez Gitarren Wettbewerb Iserlohn	10th	Iserlohn	Germany	2021
1st	Alexander Frauchi International Guitar Competition and Festival	Международный конкурс и фестиваль исполнителей на классической гитаре имени Александра Фраучи	7th	Moscow	Russia	2021
1st	Altamira International Virtual Guitar Competition	年阿尔达米拉国际网络吉他比赛	2nd	Hong Kong	China	2021
1st	Koblenz International Guitar Competition Hubert Käppel		27th	Koblenz	Germany	2020
1st	Dutch Guitar Foundation International Guitar Concerto Competition		2nd	Groningen	Netherlands	2020
1st	International Classical Guitar Competition Andrés Segovia	Certamen Internacional de Guitarra Clásica Andrés Segovia	35th	La Herradura	Spain	2020
1st	International Guitar Competition "Paris Guitar Foundation"	Concours International de Guitare "Paris Guitar Foundation"	3rd	Paris	France	2019
1st	Qingdao International Guitar Art Festival and Competition	青岛国际吉他艺术节古典吉他公开赛	3rd	Qingdao	China	2019
1st	Paris International Guitar Competition "Alberto Ponce"	Concours international de guitare de Paris "Alberto Ponce"	1st	Paris	France	2018
1st	Spring Music Festival, International Guitar Competition	Festival de Música da Primavera, Concurso Internacional de Guitarra	3rd	Viseu	Portugal	2018
1st	Miami International GuitART Festival and Concert Artist Performance Competition		1st	Miami, FL	US	2018
1st	Michele Pittaluga International Classical Guitar Competition	Concorso Internazionale di Chitarra Classica Michele Pittaluga	50th	Alessandria	Italy	2017
1st	Budapest International Guitar Competition	Budapesti Nemzetközi Gitárverseny	2nd	Budapest	Hungary	2017
1st	Valle dei Laghi International Guitar Competition	Concorso internazionale di chitarra classica Valle dei Laghi	1st	Vezzano	Italy	2017
1st	Zagreb Guitar Festival and International Guitar Competition	Zagreb Guitar Festival, Međunarodno Natjecanje Klasične Gitare	3rd	Zagreb	Croatia	2017
1st	International Guitar Competition "Alvaro Mantovani"	Concorso Internazionale di Chitarra "Alvaro Mantovani"	2nd	Follonica	Italy	2017
1st	Singapore international Guitar Festival and Competition		7th	Singapore	Singapore	2016
1st	Linares International Guitar Competition "Andrés Segovia"	Concurso Internacional de Guitarra Ciudad de Linares "Andrés Segovia"	23rd	Linares	Spain	2016
1st	Silesian Guitar Autumn, Jan Edmund Jurkowski Memorial Guitar Competition	Śląska Jesień Gitarowa, Konkurs Gitarowy im. Jana Edmunda Jurkowskiego	16th	Tychy	Poland	2016
1st	Adelaide Guitar Festival and International Classical Guitar Competition		4th	Adelaide	Australia	2016
1st	International Guitar Competition Maurizio Biasini	Concorso Chitarristica Internazionale Maurizio Biasini - cciMB	3rd	San Francisco, CA	US	2016
1st	Guitar Meetings in Gargnano - International Competition of Gargnano	Incontri Chitarristici di Gargnano - Concorso Internazionale de Gargnano	41st	Gargnano	Italy	2016
1st	Montenegro International Guitar Competition		10th	Podgorica	Montenegro	2016
1st	International Competition "Young Virtuosos"	Международен конкурс „Млади виртуози"	12th	Sofia	Bulgaria	2016
1st	Daejeon International Guitar Competition	대전국제 기타 콩쿠르	7th	Daejeon	South Korea	2015
1st	International Classical Guitar Competition Gredos San Diego	Concurso Internacional de Guitarra Clásica Gredos San Diego	5th	Madrid	Spain	2015
1st	Guitar Competition in Pays Tarnais	Concours de Guitare en Pays Tarnais	4th	Albi	France	2015
1st	JoAnn Falletta International Guitar Concerto Competition		6th	Buffalo, NY	US	2014
1st	Taiwan International Guitar Festival & Competition	臺灣國際吉他藝術節暨大賽	6th	Taipei	Taiwan	2014
1st	International Guitar Festival China Changsha	第三届中国·长沙国际吉他艺术节: 国际吉他比赛，公开组	3rd	Changsha	China	2014
1st	International Guitar Competition "Ruggero Chiesa - Città di Camogli"	Concorso internazionale di chitarra "Ruggero Chiesa - Città di Camogli"	7th	Camogli	Italy	2014
1st	Jakarta International Guitar Festival and Competition		1st	Jakarta	Indonesia	2014
1st	Tokyo International Guitar Competition	回東京国際ギターコンクール	56th	Tokyo	Japan	2013
1st	Annual Texas Guitar Competition and Festival		12th	Dallas, TX	US	2013
1st	International Guitar Festival Sinaloa, International Guitar Competition Culiacán	Festival Internacional de Guitarra Sinaloa, Concusro Internacional de Guitarra Culiacán	6th	Culiacán	Mexico	2013
1st	International Guitar Competition "Fernando Sor"	Concorso Internazionale di Chitarra "Fernando Sor"	42nd	Rome	Italy	2013
1st	Festival Internacional de Guitare de Lausanne, International Guitar Competition "Victor Pellegrini"	Festival Internacional de Guitare de Lausanne, Concours International de Guitare de Lausanne "Víctor Pellegrini"	1st	Lausanne	Switzerland	2013
1st	International Classical Guitar Festival "Claxica", Performance Competition	Festival Internazionale di Chitarra Classica "Claxica", Concorso di Esecuzione	5th	Castel d'Aiano	Italy	2013
1st	International Guitar Competition "Ferdinando Carulli"	Concorso Internazionale di Chitarra "Ferdinando Carulli"	4th	Rome	Italy	2012
1st	International Classical Guitar Competition Robert J. Vidal	Concours International de Guitare Classique Robert J. Vidal	3rd	Barbezieux	France	2011
1st	International Classical Guitar Competition and Festival of Sernancelhe	Concurso e Festival Internacional de Guitarra Clássica de Sernancelhe	13th	Sernancelhe	Portugal	2011
1st	Liechtenstein Guitar Festival ligita, International ligita Guitar Competition	Liechtensteiner Gitarrentage ligita, Internationalen ligita Gitarrenwettbewerb	6th	Eschen	Liechtenstein	2011
1st	International Guitar Competition "Ville d'Antony"	Le Concours International de Guitare "Ville d'Antony"	12th	Antony	France	2011
1st	Guitar Art Festival		12th	Belgrade	Serbia	2011
1st	International Competition of Guitar - Mottola, International Guitar Competition	Festival Internazionale della Chitarra – Mottola, Concorso Internazionale di esecuzione per Chitarra	18th	Mottola	Italy	2010
1st	International Guitar Festival and Competition Heinsberg	Internationalen Gitarrenfestival und Internationalen Gitarrenwettbewerb Heinsberg	3rd	Heinsberg	Germany	2009
1st	European Classical Guitar Competition "Enrico Mercatali"	Concorso Europeo di Chitarra Classica "Enrico Mercatali"	6th	Gorizia	Italy	2009
1st	International "GuitAs" Guitar Art Contest	Міжнародний конкурс гітарного мистецтва "ГітАс"	3rd	Kyiv	Ukraine	2009
1st	International Guitar Competition "Dniprovski suzir'ya"	Міжнародний конкурс гітарного виконавського мистецтва «Дніпровські сузір'я»	3rd	Ukrainka	Ukraine	2008
1st	International Festival of Guitar Music "Kiev"	Міжнародний фестиваль гітарної музики "Київ″	1st	Kyiv	Ukraine	2007

=== Second prizes ===
	Name			Location		
Prize	Competition	Native	Edition	Town	Country	Year
2nd	Alhambra International Guitar Competition	Concurso Internacional de Guitarra Alhambra	16th	Valencia	Spain	2024
2nd	Baltimore International Guitar Competition		1st	Baltimore, MD	US	2022
2nd	Alhambra International Guitar Competition	Concurso Internacional de Guitarra Alhambra	15th	Valencia	Spain	2022
2nd	Guitar Foundation of America International Concert Artist Competition		39th	Indianapolis, IN	US	2022
2nd	Florida Guitar Foundation's International Classical Guitar Competition		4th	Miami, FL	US	2020
2nd	Alexander Frauchi International Guitar Competition and Festival	Международный конкурс и фестиваль исполнителей на классической гитаре имени Александра Фраучи	6th	Moscow	Russia	2019
2nd	International Guitar Competition "Francisco Tarrega"	Certamen Internacional de Guitarra "Francisco Tarrega"	53rd	Benicàssim	Spain	2019
2nd	International Guitar Festival and Competition in Bearn	Festival International de Guitare en Béarn des Gaves	3rd	Bearn	France	2019
2nd	International Classical Guitar Competition Andrés Segovia	Certamen Internacional de Guitarra Clásica Andrés Segovia	34th	La Herradura	Spain	2019
2nd	International Guitar Competition "Francisco Tarrega"	Certamen Internacional de Guitarra "Francisco Tarrega"	52nd	Benicàssim	Spain	2018
2nd	International Biennial Guitar Competition "Emilio Pujol"	Concurso Internacional Bienal de Guitarra "Emilio Pujol"	19th	Sassari	Italy	2017
2nd	Alhambra International Guitar Competition	Concurso Internacional de Guitarra Alhambra	8th	Valencia	Spain	2016
2nd	Spring Music Festival, International Guitar Competition	Festival de Música da Primavera, Concurso Internacional de Guitarra	2nd	Viseu	Portugal	2016
2nd	China Shenyang International Guitar Festival "International Classical Guitar Open Competition"	中国•沈阳国际吉他艺术节 "国际古典吉他公开赛"	2nd	Shenyang	China	2016
2nd	"Guitar Gems" International Classical Guitar Festival & Competition	פניני גיטרה	10th	Nethanya	Israel	2015
2nd	Amarante International Guitar Competition	Concurso Internacional de Guitarra de Amarante	1st	Amarante	Portugal	2015
2nd	Nilüfer International Classical Guitar Competition	Nilüfer Uluslararası Klasik Gitar Yarışması	1st	Nilüfer	Turkey	2015
2nd	Budapest International Guitar Competition	Budapesti Nemzetközi Gitárverseny	1st	Budapest	Hungary	2014
2nd	Daejeon International Guitar Competition	대전국제 기타 콩쿠르	6th	Daejeon	South Korea	2014
2nd	International Guitar Competition "Francisco Tarrega"	Certamen Internacional de Guitarra "Francisco Tarrega"	47th	Benicàssim	Spain	2013
2nd	Asia International Classical Guitar Competition	การแข่งขัน กีตาร์คลาสสิค เอเชีย นานาชาติ	13th	Bangkok	Thailand	2013
2nd	International Classical Guitar Competition "Stefano Strata-Città di Pisa"	Concorso Internazionale di Chitarra Classica "Stefano Strata - città di Pisa"	4th	Pisa	Italy	2013
2nd	International Guitar Competition "Fernando Sor"	Concorso Internazionale di Chitarra "Fernando Sor"	41st	Rome	Italy	2012
2nd	International Guitar Festival & International Guitar Competition		5th	Singapore	Singapore	2011
2nd	International Guitar Festival "Ciudad de Coria", "Ciudad de Coria" (Senior) Competition	Festival Internacional de Guitarra "Ciudad de Coria", "Ciudad de Coria" (Senior) Certamen	14th	Coria	Spain	2010
2nd	Calcutta International Guitar Festival & Competition		1st	Calcutta	India	2010

==== Third prizes ====
Prize	Name		Edition	Location		Year
Prize	Competition	Native	Edition	Town	Country	Year
3rd	The Hague — Altamira International Virtual Guitar Competition		1st	The Hague	Netherlands	2021
3rd	Guitar Foundation of America International Concert Artist Competition		38th	Los Angeles, CA and Brussels	US, Belgium	2021
3rd	Altamira International Virtual Guitar Competition	年阿尔达米拉国际网络吉他比赛	1st	Hong Kong	China	2020
3rd	International Guitar Festival "Ciudad de Coria", "Ciudad de Coria" (Senior) Competition	Festival Internacional de Guitarra "Ciudad de Coria", "Ciudad de Coria" (Senior) Certamen	21st	Coria	Spain	2017
3rd	Michele Pittaluga International Classical Guitar Competition	Concorso Internazionale di Chitarra Classica Michele Pittaluga	49th	Alessandria	Italy	2016
3rd	International Classical Guitar Competition Andrés Segovia	Certamen Internacional de Guitarra Clásica Andrés Segovia	31st	La Herradura	Spain	2015
3rd	International Classical Guitar Competition "Stefano Strata-Città di Pisa"	Concorso Internazionale di Chitarra Classica "Stefano Strata - città di Pisa"	6th	Pisa	Italy	2015
3rd	Alexander Frauchi International Guitar Competition and Festival	Международный конкурс и фестиваль исполнителей на классической гитаре имени Александра Фраучи	4th	Moscow	Russia	2015
3rd	International Guitar Festival "Ciudad de Coria", "Ciudad de Coria" (Senior) Competition	Festival Internacional de Guitarra "Ciudad de Coria", "Ciudad de Coria" (Senior) Certamen	19th	Coria	Spain	2015
3rd	Spring Music Festival, International Guitar Competition	Festival de Música da Primavera, Concurso Internacional de Guitarra	1st	Viseu	Portugal	2014
3rd	International Classical Guitar Competition "Stefano Strata-Città di Pisa"	Concorso Internazionale di Chitarra Classica "Stefano Strata - città di Pisa"	5th	Pisa	Italy	2014
3rd	International Guitar Competition Maurizio Biasini	Concorso Chitarristico Internazionale Maurizio Biasini	2nd	Basel	Switzerland	2013
3rd	International Classical Guitar Competition "Julián Arcas"	Certamen Internacional de Guitarra Clásica "Julián Arcas"	13th	Almería	Spain	2013
3rd	Alexander Frauchi International Guitar Competition and Festival	Международный конкурс и фестиваль исполнителей на классической гитаре имени Александра Фраучи	3rd	Moscow	Russia	2013
3rd	"Braunschweig Classic Open" International Music Competition		2nd	Braunschweig	Germany	2013
3rd	World Guitar Competition		4th	Novi Sad	Serbia	2013
3rd	International Classical Guitar Competition Guitarmania	Concurso Internacional de Guitarra Clássica Guitarmania	6th	Almada	Portugal	2011
3rd	Alexander Frauchi International Guitar Competition and Festival	Международный конкурс и фестиваль исполнителей на классической гитаре имени Александра Фраучи	2nd	Moscow	Russia	2011
3rd	International Guitar Festival "Ciudad de Coria", "Ciudad de Coria" (Senior) Competition	Festival Internacional de Guitarra "Ciudad de Coria", "Ciudad de Coria" (Senior) Certamen	15th	Coria	Spain	2011
3rd	International Classical Guitar Competition José Tomás - Villa de Petrer	Concurso Internacional de Guitarra Clásica José Tomás - Villa de Petrer	10th	Petrer	Spain	2011
3rd	Silesian Guitar Autumn, Jan Edmund Jurkowski Memorial Guitar Competition	Śląska Jesień Gitarowa, Konkurs Gitarowy im. Jana Edmunda Jurkowskiego	13th	Tychy	Poland	2010

=== Special prizes ===
Prize	Name		Edition	Location		Year
Prize	Competition	Native	Edition	Town	Country	Year
Audience Award	Baltimore International Guitar Competition		1st	Baltimore, MD	US	2022
Audience Award	Dutch Guitar Foundation International Guitar Concerto Competition		2nd	Groningen	Netherlands	2020
Audience Award	International Guitar Competition "Paris Guitar Foundation"	Concours International de Guitare "Paris Guitar Foundation"	3rd	Paris	France	2019
Audience Award	Paris International Guitar Competition "Alberto Ponce"	Concours international de guitare de Paris "Alberto Ponce"	1st	Paris	France	2018
Audience Award	Spring Music Festival, International Guitar Competition	Festival de Música da Primavera, Concurso Internacional de Guitarra	3rd	Viseu	Portugal	2018
Leo Brouwer prize (best M. Castelnuovo-Tedesco - Capriccio Diabolico interpretation)	International Classical Guitar Competition Andrés Segovia	Certamen Internacional de Guitarra Clásica Andrés Segovia	33rd	La Herradura	Spain	2018
Audience Award	International Guitar Competition "Alvaro Mantovani"	Concorso Internazionale di Chitarra "Alvaro Mantovani"	2nd	Follonica	Italy	2017
Audience Award	Alhambra International Guitar Competition	Concurso Internacional de Guitarra Alhambra	8th	Valencia	Spain	2016
Special prize	Silesian Guitar Autumn, Jan Edmund Jurkowski Memorial Guitar Competition	Śląska Jesień Gitarowa, Konkurs Gitarowy im. Jana Edmunda Jurkowskiego	16th	Tychy	Poland	2016
Audience Award	International Classical and Flamenco Guitar Competition of Tarn Department	International Concours de Guitare Classique Espagnole et Flamenca en Pays Tarnais	4th	Albi	France	2015
Audience Award	JoAnn Falletta International Guitar Concerto Competition		6th	Buffalo, NY	US	2014
Musicians Award	JoAnn Falletta International Guitar Concerto Competition		6th	Buffalo, NY	US	2014
Audience Award	Taiwan International Guitar Festival & Competition	臺灣國際吉他藝術節暨大賽	6th	Taipei	Taiwan	2014
Audience Award	Spring Music Festival, International Guitar Competition	Festival de Música da Primavera, Concurso Internacional de Guitarra	1st	Viseu	Portugal	2014
Special prize (best F. Tarrega work interpretation)	International Guitar Competition "Francisco Tarrega"	Certamen Internacional de Guitarra "Francisco Tarrega"	48th	Benicàssim	Spain	2014
Special prize (best F. Tarrega work interpretation)	International Guitar Competition "Francisco Tarrega"	Certamen Internacional de Guitarra "Francisco Tarrega"	47th	Benicàssim	Spain	2013
"Carla Minen" prize (best F. Sor work interpretation)	International Guitar Competition "Fernando Sor"	Concorso Internazionale di Chitarra "Fernando Sor"	42nd	Rome	Italy	2013
Audience Award	International Guitar Festival "Ciudad de Coria", "Ciudad de Coria" (Senior) Competition	Festival Internacional de Guitarra "Ciudad de Coria", "Ciudad de Coria" (Senior) Certamen	15th	Coria	Spain	2011
Best young performer prize	International Classical Guitar Competition Heitor Villa-Lobos	Concurso Internacional de Guitarra Clásica Heitor Villa-Lobos	1st	Salamanca	Spain	2011
Special prize for the best interpretation of a classical work	Vienna Guitar Forum	Forum Gitarre Wien	15th	Vienna	Austria	2010
Audience Award	International Guitar Festival and Competition Heinsberg	Internationalen Gitarrenfestival und Internationalen Gitarrenwettbewerb Heinsberg	3rd	Heinsberg	Germany	2009
Junior Jury Prize	International Guitar Festival and Competition Heinsberg	Internationalen Gitarrenfestival und Internationalen Gitarrenwettbewerb Heinsberg	3rd	Heinsberg	Germany	2009
Audience Award	European Classical Guitar Competition "Enrico Mercatali"	Concorso Europeo di Chitarra Classica "Enrico Mercatali"	6th	Gorizia	Italy	2009
President of the Italian Republic Medal	European Classical Guitar Competition "Enrico Mercatali"	Concorso Europeo di Chitarra Classica "Enrico Mercatali"	6th	Gorizia	Italy	2009
Youngest performer prize	International Festival of Guitar Music "Kiev"	Міжнародний фестиваль гітарної музики "Київ″	1st	Kyiv	Ukraine	2007

== Recordings ==
The conventional CD recordings are listed below:

Year	CD title	Recording label	Catalog no. / Barcode	Notes
2024	Guitar Recital: Marko Topchii, Winner 2023, Guitar Foundation of America (GFA) Competition (Laureate Series)	Naxos Records	8.574630 / 747313463077	As a winner of 40th Guitar Foundation of America International Concert Artist Competition
2022	Carnival	Contrastes Records	CR202204 / 8435383691132	As a winner of 54th International Guitar Competition "Francisco Tarrega"
2018	Guitar Recital: Marko Topchii, Winner 2017, Michele Pittaluga Guitar Competition (Laureate Series)	Naxos Records	8.573963 / 747313396375	As a winner of 50th Michele Pittaluga International Classical Guitar Competition
canceled				As a winner of 3rd Zagreb International Guitar Competition
canceled				As a winner of 16th Jan Edmund Jurkowski Memorial Guitar Competition (Silesian Guitar Autumn)
2016	Marko Topchii	Fleur de Son Classics, Ltd. / dist. Naxos of America Inc.	FDS58036 / 856092001360	As a winner of 6th JoAnn Falletta International Guitar Concerto Competition
2016	Van Gogh Fire	Contrastes Records	CR201601 / 019962131752	As a winner of 5th International Classical Guitar Competition "Gredos San Diego"
2015	Stars of the Guitar	Beau Fleuve Records	610708-094982 / 610708094982	Highlights from the JoAnn Falletta International Guitar Concerto Competition. Buffalo Philharmonic Orchestra, JoAnn Falletta and various artists. Marko Topchii performing Heitor Villa-Lobos: Concerto pour Guitare et Petit Orchestra

Topchii has many video recordings on his official YouTube channel.
