= The Composers' House in Ivanovo =

Residency and workshop for composers in Ivanovo, Russia

Coordinates: 57.011176°N 41.053520°E

The Composers' House in Ivanovo, Russia, also often simply referred to by musicians as "Ivanovo", was created in 1943 by the USSR Union of Composers and its organizing committee. Their goal was to help Soviet composers during these difficult years and to give them the opportunity to continue to do creative work while ensuring basic living conditions, at least during the summer months.

== Location ==
The Composers' House is located on the current outskirts of the city of Ivanovo (Ivanovo Oblast), Russia, about 9 km from the city center, and about 250 km north-east of Moscow, on the former estate of land owner A. Stefan, a relative of Baroness Nadezhda von Meck, in (what used to be) a very secluded and quiet area near the small river Kharinka, bordered by spacious fields and a beautiful little forest of centuries-old oaks and birches (nicknamed "Prokofiev's grove" by composers who find it especially inspiring).

An highlighted map of the area can be found on WikiMapia or choose any other map server by clicking on the GPS coordinates located in the top right corner of this page.

== English names used ==
The original Russian name for this composers' retreat is Russian: Дом творчества композиторов (sometimes simply abbreviated as Russian: Иваново ДТК (Ivanovo DTK)). A literal translation would be "House Creativity Composers". In English documents (books and articles) it has been translated variously as:

- The Composers' House in Ivanovo
- The House of Composers in Ivanovo
- The House of Creativity in Ivanovo
- The Creativity House of Composers in Ivanovo
- The Composers' House of Creativity in Ivanovo
- The Creative House for Composers in Ivanovo

where the word "Composers" is sometimes replaced by "Musicians", "House" by "Home", "Retreat" or "Resort" and where "in Ivanovo" can become "near Ivanovo" or even "near the town of Ivanovo".

Note that Russian: Иваново, romanized: Ivanovo, IPA: [ɪˈvanəvə] is pronounced more like Ivanava.

== Main source ==
An important source for the information below, especially the names of composers who came after World War II to Ivanovo, comes from the introductory text inside a booklet about a festival held in 1997. The text (in Russian ) is by Remy Iosifovna Petrushanskaya, a well-known musicologist, journalist and, from 1973, a member of (as a musicologist) and an administrator at the USSR Union of Composers. This rare material has never been published in English before.

== Early history ==
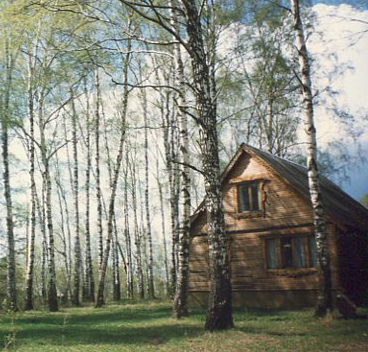
Dacha No. 19 (ca. 1997)

The Composers' House in Ivanovo, also often simply referred to by musicians as “Ivanovo”, was created in 1943, in the midst of World War II. It was the USSR Union of Composers and its organizing committee led by Reinhold Glière that set as its goal to help composers during these difficult years and to give them the opportunity to continue to do creative work while ensuring basic living conditions, at least during the summer months. Aram Khachaturian, as vice-chairman of the Composer’s Union organizing committee, was also actively involved in the creation and organisation of the Composers' House in Ivanovo; he felt that it was his duty to give back to the society that had so prodigiously recognized his talents.

Invited composers lived in separate, comfortable, one or two bedroom country cottages (dacha in Russian), each fully equipped with modern amenities (water, electricity). At evening, after dinner, everyone gathered in the biggest dacha to listen and discuss new music. Leisure time was spent with impromptu concerts, walking, discussing, collecting mushrooms, playing volleyball, playing charades and so on.

During and after World War II The House of Creativity continued to serve as a favorite place to work and to rest for several generations of composers and musicologists. Sergei Prokofiev spent there the summers of 1944 and 1945, met and became friends with R. Glière, Dmitry Kabalevsky, Dmitri Shostakovich, Vano I. Muradeli, Y.A. Shaporin and their families. Khachaturian was also there in the summer of 1943 and met with most of them. Myaskovsky spent almost one year during that period. N. Peyko, A. Eshpai, B. Tchaikovsky and many others also spent a significant amount of time in Ivanovo. Many of the dachas included a grand piano and some of them were used by the great masters themselves.

=== Famous works composed in Ivanovo ===
- Shostakovich’s Symphony No. 8 in C minor (Opus 65) was written between July 2 and September 9, 1943 after the Battle of Stalingrad and his String Quartet No. 2 in A major, Op. 68, was composed in 1944 in just nineteen days
- Prokofiev’s Eighth Piano Sonata and Symphony No. 5
- Khachaturian’s Symphony No. 2 (nicknamed the Symphony with Bells by G. Kubov)

and several other outstanding pieces of music.

=== Prokofiev's stays ===
Sergei Sergeyevich Prokofiev and his wife Mira Aleksandrovna Mendel'son-Prokofieva spent about three months at Ivanovo during the summers of 1944 and 1945 to escape the constraints of wartime Moscow. In 1944 they were there from June 9 and left on August 27 back to Moscow by train. In 1945 they were there from around June 20 until October when they hurried back to Moscow because of the imminent premiere of his ballet Cinderella.

In a letter to his wife's mother he wrote about how big their room was and how he was "totally delighted by the place", especially the birch forest and its flowers which was thereafter nicknamed "Prokofiev's forest" by other composers. Prokofiev himself nicknamed the retreat the "State Chicken Farm" or the "State Pig Farm" is his letters to friends because of the livestock still living on the grounds at the time and the renovated farm buildings in which most of the composers lived. Shostakovich for example lived in what used to be a henhouse.

== Creative workshops ==
Creative workshops for young promising composers was an idea attributed to musicologist V. Vinogradov, professor at the Moscow Conservatory. They were organised in the Creative House from 1954. The first head of the workshops was I. Belorusets. In subsequent years the workshops were directed by musicians and teachers such as N.A. Timofeev, N. Ivanov-Radkevich, S. Ryauzov, G. Frid, Y. Kreyn, N. Peyko, and R. Bunin. An important contributor to the operation and development of the workshops was Yuri A. Fortunatov, professor at the Moscow Conservatory; since 1955 he was a regular consultant of the so-called Ivanovo Academy.

Workshops participants met with a composer-consultant-mentor at least twice weekly. After finishing the piece they were working on, each composer showed it to other colleagues. Sergey Berinsky later added the tradition that each mentor-composer should also present their newest piece for discussion.

Workshops in the 1980s–90s were given by V. Dougan, A. Boyarsky, A. Luppov, B. Getselev, A. Golovin, V. Ekimovsky, Vasily Lobanov, M. Bronner, and others.

One of the most active supporters of the workshops in Ivanovo was Sergey Berinsky. Under his leadership were organised the Creative Workshop festival and the Sergey Berinsky Club, where many pieces by young composers and workshop participants were premiered. After his death in 1998, former Ivanovo participant Marina Shmotova continued to organize these activities in his memory.

Among the composers participating in these workshops were T. Shkerbina, E. Lebedeva, L. Rodionova, Tatiana A. Gordeeva, O. Paiberdin, S. Patromansky, O. Zarodnuk, B. Dondokov, A. Pavluchuk, Andrey Zelenskiy, N. Miroshnichenko, L. Terskaya, Marina Shmotova, B. Filanovsky, D. Yanov-Yanovsky, V. Abaeva, Galina Grigorjeva, M. Gribinchik, R. Kronlaks, A. Gavrilets, and others.

Berinsky wrote My Ivanovo about the typical daily life of a composer residing in Ivanovo.

== Legacy ==
The workshops at the Creative House were fertile ground for the development of new musical ideas by composers such as E. Rakhmadiyev, B. Yampilov, O. Krasotov, A. Melikov, A. Rzaev, P. Rivilis, V. Tormis, S. Cortes, D. Smolsky, Dilorom Saidaminova, S. Belimov, A. Terterian, S. Berinsky, V. Lobanov, A. Luppov, A. Boyarsky and others. Many of them, taking over the baton from the older masters, became themselves consultants for the Ivanovo workshops.

After the collapse of the USSR in 1991 the Union of Composers of Russia took over the responsibility of the Creative House for Composers in Ivanovo. The Union, through its Music Foundation, is also responsible for the preservation of the extensive collection of workshop material, scores and audio recordings of composers from all over the world.
