= Petrit Çeku =

- Born: 2 June 1985 (age 40); Prizren, Yugoslavia (now Kosovo)
- Genres: Classical
- Occupation: Musician
- Instrument: Guitar

Petrit Çeku (born 2 June 1985) is a Kosovar classical guitarist.

== Biography ==
Born in Prizren, Kosovo, Çeku was inspired to play guitar by his father from the age of six. He attended the Lorenc Antoni music school from age 9 to 17, where he took lessons in classical guitar from Luan Sapunxhiu.

In 2002, Çeku was invited by Xhevdet Sahatxhija to study in Zagreb, Croatia, at the Pavao Markovac school of music. In 2008, Çeku graduated from the Zagreb Academy of Music in the class of Darko Petrinjak. From 2009–13 he went on to study with Manuel Barrueco at the Peabody Conservatory in Baltimore, USA.

Çeku has performed many recitals throughout Europe and the Americas and was a soloist with orchestras such as Baltimore Symphony, Czech Chamber Philharmonic, State Hermitage Orchestra of St. Petersburg and Zagreb Philharmonic. He also appears regularly with the famed Zagreb Soloists and is a founding member of Guitar Trio Elogio.

He regularly performs at music festivals such as Next Generation Festival, Samobor Festival, Panama Guitar Festival, Moscow Guitar Virtuosi and Prishtina’s Remusica Festival. He also teaches regularly at the Polish Guitar Academy and the Young Masters Samobor Festival. From time to time, the musician returns to his hometown with concerts and various musical performances.

Petrit Çeku plays on a guitar made by Ross Gutmeier.

== Awards ==
=== Prizes ===
- 2012 Parkening International Guitar Competition, Malibu, California
- 2011 Allentown Symphony Schadt String Competition, Allentown, Pennsylvania
- 2011 Maurizio Biasini International Guitar Competition, Bologna, Italy
- 2007 Michele Pittaluga International Classical Guitar Competition, Alessandria, Italy
- 2005 Ferdo Livadic Competition, Samobor, Croatia, Best Concert Performance
- 2004 Andres Segovia International Competition for Young Guitarists, Velbert Germany
- 2004 Emilio Pujol Competition, Sassari, Italy
- 2003 All Croatia Competition, Dubrovnik, Croatia
- 2003 Anna Amalia Guitar Competition, Weimar, Germany

=== Second Prizes ===
- 2012 JoAnn Falletta International Guitar Concerto Competition, Buffalo, New York
- 2006 Parkening International Guitar Competition, Malibu, California
- 2006 Printemps de la Guitare, Charleroi, Belgium

=== Other Awards ===
- 2012 JoAnn Falletta International Guitar Concerto Competition, Buffalo, New York, Audience Favorite and Musicians Favorite Honors
- 2008 Zagreb Philharmonic, Best Young Musician of the Year, Zagreb, Croatia
- 2005 Ivo Vuljevic Best Young Musician of the Year Award

== Discography ==
Çeku's first CD was released in 2008 at the Naxos label. His recordings of Bach's complete cello suites, arranged by Valter Dešpalj, were released in 2016 under the Spanish label Eudora
