= Alhambra International Guitar Competition =

The Concurso Internacional de Guitarra Alhambra (English: Alhambra International Guitar Competition) is a biannual competition for classical guitarists which takes place at the Palau de la Música in Valencia, Spain.

Established in 1990 by Manufacturas Alhambra S.L. of Muro de Alcoy, Alicante, Spain, a well-known manufacturer of Spanish guitars, in order to mark their 25th anniversary, the event has since become one of the most prestigious awards for young guitarists. Participation is restricted to those of 35 years or younger, and previous first prize winners may not re-enter the competition in later years. There is a substantial monetary prize, with lesser amounts for the other finalists. In recent years the Concurso Alhambra has additionally awarded a Public's Prize as well as special prizes aimed at the promotion of Spanish composition for the guitar. The audience is open to members of the public.

== List of Previous Winners ==
Year	First Prize		Second Prize		Third Prize		Finalist	
2016	Andrea González Caballero	Spain	Marko Topchii	Ukraine	Mircea-Stefan Gogoncea	Romania	Isabel Sánchez Millán	Spain
2014	Ali Arango	Cuba	Anton Baranov	Russia	Hugo Molto Medina	Spain	Thomas Viloteau	France
2012	Kyuhee Park	Korea	Emanuele Buono	Italy	Emerson Salazar	Chile	Andrea González	Spain
2010	Rafael Aguirre Miñarro	Spain	Srdjan Bulat	Croatia	Jorge Caballero	Peru	Fernando Espí Cremades	Spain
2008	Irina Kulikova	Russia	Esteban Espinoza	Chile	Isaac Bustos	Nicaragua	Li Meng Yi	China
2006	Juuso Nieminen	Finland	Anders Clemens Oien	Norway	Bertrand Pietu	France	Alí Jorge Arango Marcano	Cuba
2004	Goran Krivokapic	Serbia and Montenegro	Marco Tamayo	Cuba	Johan Fostier	Belgium	David Martínez García	Spain
2002	Graham Anthony Devine	Great Britain	José Antonio Escobar Olivos	Chile	Goran Krivokapic	Yugoslavia	Grzegorz Krawiec	Poland
2000	Marcin Dylla	Poland	Fotis Koutsothodoros	Greece	Johan Fostier	Belgium	Graham Anthony Devine	Great Britain
1998	Ricardo Jesús Gallen García	Spain	Marcin Dylla	Poland	Nangialai Nashir	Afghanistan	Dae-Kun Jang	South Korea
1996	Denis Azabagić	Bosnia Herzegovina	Zoran Dukic	Netherlands	Nuria Mora Fernández	Spain	None	None
1994	Iván Rijos Guzmán	Puerto Rico	Denis Azabagić	Bosnia and Herzegovina	Antonio Manuel Duro Herrera	Spain	María Dolores Gutiérrez Viloria	Spain
1990	Eduardo Baranzano Fernández	Uruguay	Margarita García Escarpa	Spain	Carlos Oramas Cabrera	Spain	Alexander Sergei Ramírez	Germany
