= Marco Sartor =

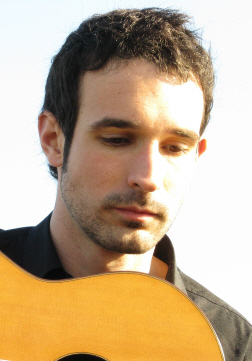

Background information
- Born: Montevideo
- Genre: Classical music
- Occupation: Guitarist
- Instrument: Guitar
- Label: Fleur de Son
- Website: www.marcosartor.com

Marco Sartor is a Uruguayan classical guitarist.

== Biography ==
Born in Montevideo, Uruguay, Marco Sartor has won numerous international competitions including the Schadt String Competition, Texas Guitar Competition, and the JoAnn Falletta International Guitar Concerto Competition. He has performed extensively across the United States and appeared as a soloist with the Allentown Symphony, Virginia Symphony, Buffalo Philharmonic, Ann Arbor Symphony, Indianapolis Chamber and other orchestras in the USA.

Sartor has also performed and been featured in radio and television broadcasts throughout Spain, Germany, Mexico, Chile, Canada, Argentina and Uruguay.

Sartor completed his Doctor of Musical Arts degree at Yale University, and holds degrees from the College of Charleston and Carnegie Mellon University as well.

He studied with Robert Ravera, Mario Paysee and Eduardo Fernandez in Uruguay and Marc Regnier, James Ferla, and Benjamin Verdery in the US. In 2009 he recorded his debut CD for the Fleur de Son label and performed with the Buffalo Philharmonic and the Sodre Orchestra in Uruguay.

As a teacher, he has given master-classes in Uruguay, Argentina, and a number of universities and conservatories in the USA. He has started the guitar programs at the Carnegie Mellon Music Preparatory School in Pittsburgh, PA and at the Charleston Academy of Music in Charleston, SC. He has been in the faculty of the New World School of the Arts in Miami, and is currently a faculty member at Wake Forest University in Winston-Salem, NC, where he teaches classical and jazz guitar, chamber music, Western music history and Latin American music.

== Discography ==
Fleur de Son released Marco's debut CD in May 2010. The recording includes works by John Dowland, Domenico Scarlatti, Fernando Sor, Manuel Ponce, Abel Fleury, Tom Eastwood and Nikola Starcevic.

== Awards ==
- 1st prize: 1998 Centro Guitarristico del Uruguay
- 1st prize: 2002 Schadt String Competition Allentown, Pennsylvania
- 1st prize: 2003 Music Teachers National Association Salt Lake City, Utah
- 1st prize: 2004 Appalachian GuitarFest Boone, North Carolina
- 1st prize: 2006 Texas Guitar Competition. Dallas, Texas
- 1st prize: 2007 Pittsburgh Concert Society Pittsburgh, Pennsylvania
- 1st prize: 2008 JoAnn Falletta International Guitar Concerto Competition, Buffalo, New York
- 2nd prize: 2000 Colon Competition (Argentina)
- 2nd prize: 2000 Ciudad de Montevideo Competition (Uruguay)
- 2nd prize: 2005 Texas Guitar Competition. Dallas, Texas
- 2nd prize: 2005 St. Joseph International Guitar Competition St. Joseph, Missouri
- 2nd prize: 2005 National Guitar Workshop. New Milford, Connecticut
- 3rd prize: Guitar Foundation of America (California 2001 & Florida 2002)
- 3rd prize: International Koblenz Guitar Competition 2007 "Hubert Kappel"
- 3rd prize: Miami International Guitar Competition 2007 Miami, Florida

== Reviews ==
“Sartor’s playing is characterized by the smoothness and assurance of his technique that seems casual in difficult moments. This contributes to the artist’s shaping of the musical line and the grace of his rapid figurations. The most prominent view of Sartor is his nimble fingering, fluent long runs, and articulate solo passages. In the rousing Finale, his rhythmic acuity struck in staking out the movement’s opposition of guitar and orchestra. The audience loved it... a truly magical spell.”

"Piccolo introduces us to a lot of new talent, but none can top the prodigious talent of Sartor...plays with great heart...consummate skill, sparkling technique and cleanly executed embellishments... a sizzling example of sterling talent." Post and Courier, Charleston, SC.
