= Graham Anthony Devine =

English classical guitarist (born 1971)

Graham Anthony Devine (born 1971 in Liverpool, Merseyside) is an English classical guitarist.

== Biography ==
Devine studied with Gordon Crosskey at Chetham's School of Music in Manchester. He moved to Brazil aged 19, where he performed and taught guitar.

Devine has won international competitions including the Mottola International Guitar Competition in Italy, the Francisco Tárrega International Guitar Competition in Benicàssim, Spain, and the Stotsenberg International Guitar Competition in the United States. He won first prize at the 2002 Alhambra International Guitar Competition in Alcoy, Spain, and again at the Emilio Pujol Guitar Competition in Italy.

He has recorded three albums for Naxos Records, featuring music by Leo Brouwer, Antonio Carlos Jobim, Alan Rawsthorne, Heitor Villa-Lobos and William Walton, among others. His other recordings for Granary-Guitars include music by Johann Sebastian Bach, Enrique Granados, Manuel Ponce, Joaquín Rodrigo and Domenico Scarlatti and the first recording of Federico Moreno Torroba's Sonata-Fantasia.

He is currently a guitar tutor at Trinity College of Music in London.

== Discography ==
- Appassionata (Granary Guitars 2002) Granary Guitars
- Leo Brouwer: Guitar Music, Vol. 3 (Naxos 2003)
- Burgalesa (Granary Guitars 2004)
- Manhã de Carnaval: Guitar Music from Brazil (Naxos 2004)
- British Guitar Music (Naxos 2005)
- Leo Brouwer: Guitar Music, Vol. 4 to be released (Naxos 2007)
