= Frauchi International Competition and Festival =

- Genre: Classical guitar
- Frequency: Bi-annually (odd years)
- Location(s): Moscow, Russia
- Years active: 2009 – present
- Organised by: Alexander Frauchi Foundation
- Website: alexanderfrauchi.com/en/

The Frauchi International Competition and Festival (Russian: Международный конкурс и фестиваль имени Фраучи) is a biannual competition for classical guitarists and festival which takes place in Moscow, Russia.

Founded in 2009 by pianist Maria Latinskaya-Frauchi in memory of her late husband, the famous Russian guitarist and guitar professor Alexander Frauchi, this competition has become one of the most prestigious awards for guitarists in Russia and abroad. The competition has no age limit, and winners of previous first prizes cannot re-enter the competition in subsequent years. There is a substantial cash prize, with smaller amounts for other finalists.

During the competitional years, the stars of the Frauchi festivals have included Roland Dyens, Marcin Dylla, Aniello Desiderio, Zoran Dukic, Sérgio and Odair Assad, Roberto Aussel, Pavel Steidl, Leo Brouwer, Ricardo Gallen, David Pavlovic, José María Gallardo Del Rey, Yamandu Costa, Artyom Dervoed, Dimitri Illarionov and the Kupinski Guitar Duo.

== List of previous winners ==
Year	First Prize	Second Prize	Third Prize	Diploma
2023	Vera Danilina, Russia	Vyacheslav Shugaev, Russia	Nikita Nedelko, Russia	Sergey Perelekhov and Ivan Smertin, Russia
2021	Marko Topchii, Ukraine	Vera Danilina, Russia	Domenico Savio Mottola, Italy	Georgi Dimitrov, Bulgaria, and Sergey Perelekhov, Russia
2019	not awarded	Marko Topchii, Ukraine	Vera Danilina, Russia, and Carlotta Dalia, Italy	Dmytro Omelchak, Ukraine
2017	Tengyue Zhang, China	Marco Piperno, Italy	Giulia Ballare, Italy	Nikita Nedelko, Russia, and Bogdan Mihailescu, Romania
2015	not awarded	Andrea De Vitis, Italy, and Vera Danilina, Russia	Roman Zorkin, Russia, and Marko Topchii, Ukraine	Mircea Stefan Gogoncea, Romania
2013	Artyom Dervoed, Russia	Anton Baranov, Russia	Marko Topchii, Ukraine, and Yuri Aleshnikov, Russia	Dmitry Zagumennikov, Russia
2011	Rovshan Mamedkuliev, Russia	Artyom Dervoed, Russia	Marko Topchii, Ukraine, and Konstantin Okudzhava, Russia	Anton Baranov, Russia
2009	not awarded	Konstantin Okudzhava, Russia, and Pavel Kukhta, Belarus	Rovshan Mamedkuliev, Russia	Ilya Makhov and Anton Baranov, Russia

== See also ==
- International classical guitar competitions
- List of classical music competitions
- Classical guitar
