= Dušan Bogdanović =

Serbian-American composer and guitarist

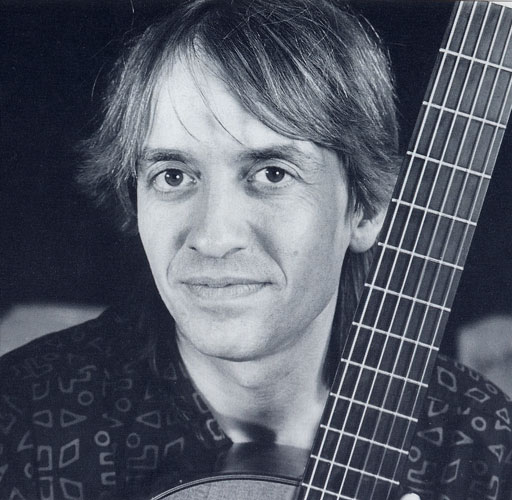
- Dusan Bogdanovic, Tokyo, 1992

Background information
- Born: February 11, 1955 (age 71); Belgrade, PR Serbia, Yugoslavia
- Genres: Classical, jazz
- Occupations: Musician, composer
- Instrument: Guitar
- Labels: Doberman-Yppan Palo Alto, Brilliant Classics Concord, M. A., GSP
- Website: www.dusanbogdanovic.com

Dušan Bogdanović (Serbian: Душан Богдановић) (born 1955) is a Serbian-born American composer and classical guitarist. He has explored musical languages which are reflected in his style today: a synthesis of classical, jazz, and ethnic music. As a soloist and in collaboration with other artists, he has toured extensively throughout Europe, Japan, and the U.S. He has taught at the University of Southern California, San Francisco Conservatory, and the Geneva University of Music.

His performing and recording activities include work with chamber ensembles of diverse stylistic orientations: the Falla Guitar Trio; a harpsichord and guitar duo with Elaine Comparone; and jazz collaborations with Anthony Cox, Charlie Haden, James Newton, Milcho Leviev, Arto Tunçboyacıyan, and others. Notably, he is a co-author with Sting on "Prisms (Six Song by Sting)" published by Singidunum Music and Steerpike Overseas Limited.

Dušan Bogdanović's recording credits include close to twenty albums (on Intuition, Doberman, Ess.a.y, M.A. Recordings, GSP and other labels), ranging from Bach Trio Sonatas to contemporary works. Over two hundred of his compositions are published by Bèrben Editions (Italy), Doberman-Yppan (Canada) and Guitar Solo publications (San Francisco).

His theoretical work includes polyrhythmic and polymetric studies, as well as a bilingual publication covering three-voice counterpoint and Renaissance improvisation for guitar (Bèrben) and Ex Ovo. (Doberman-Yppan). He has also collaborated on multi-disciplinary projects involving music, psychology, philosophy, and fine arts.

== Partial discography ==
- Worlds, M.A (1989)
- Keys to Talk By, M.A (1992)
- Bach with Pluck! ESS.A.Y (1992)
- Levantine Tales, M.A (1992)
- Bach with Pluck! Vol. 2, ESS.A.Y (1994)
- In the Midst of Winds, (1994)
- Mysterious Habitats, Guitar Solo Publications, (1995)
- Unconscious in Brazil, Guitar Solo Publications (1999)
- Yano Mori, Intuition (1999)
- Canticles, Editions Doberman (2001)
- Early to Rise, (Palo Alto, 2003)
- And Yet..., Editions Doberman (2005)
- Winter Tale, Editions Doberman (2008)
- Look at the Big Birds, Carmen Alvarez, Francisco Bernier, Contrastes (2014)
- En la tierra, Editions Doberman (2015)
- Bogdanovic: Guitar Music, Angelo Marchese, Brilliant Classics (2015)

== Partial list of works ==
Solo guitar

- Sonata no.1 (1978), Berben 2445
- Cinq Miniatures Printanieres (1979), Berben 2308
- Jazz Sonata (1982), Guitar Solo Publications 44
- Introduction, Passacaglia and Fugue for the Golden Flower (1985), Berben 3015
- Sonata no.2, (1985), Berben 2581
- Polyrhythmic and Polymetric Studies, (1990), Berben 3320
- Raguette no.2, (1991), Berben 3601
- Six Balkan Miniatures (1991), Guitar Solo Publications 79
- Mysterious Habitats (1994), Guitar Solo Publications 131
- In Winter Garden (1996), Guitar Solo Publications 163
- Three African Sketches (1996), Guitar Solo Publications 195
- Book of the Unknown Standards (1997), Doberman 267
- Three Ricercars (1998), Doberman 258
- Triptico en Omenaje a Garcia Lorca (2002), Doberman 532
- Hymn to the Muse (2003), Doberman 525
- Fantasia (hommage a Maurice Ohana) (2009), Doberman 697

Chamber music with guitar

- Sonata Fantasia, 2 guitars (1990–91), Berben 3501
- No Feathers on This Frog, 2 guitars (1990), Doberman 300
- Canticles, 2 guitars (1998), Doberman 281
- Tres Nubes, 2 guitars (2004), Doberman 488
- Tombeau de Purcell, 2 guitars (2004), Doberman 504
- Trio, 3 prepared guitars (1989), Doberman 675
- Pastorale, 3 guitars (1991), Guitar Solo Publications 190
- Lyric Quartet, 4 guitars (1993), Berben 3669
- Introduction and Dance, 4 guitars (1995), Doberman 278
- Codex XV, 4 guitars or guitar ensemble (1998), Doberman 263
- The Snow Queen (A Musical Fairy Tale after H. C. Andersen), guitar ensemble (7) and narrator (2008), Doberman 669
- Pure Land, voice, flute and guitar (poetry by Patricia Capetola) (1981) Doberman 681
- Crow, voice, flute, guitar and bass (poetry by Ted Hughes) (1990), Doberman 269
- Five Songs on poetry by Gabriela Mistral, voice and guitar (1991), Doberman 318
- Metamorphoses, harp and guitar (1993), Berben 3777
- Like a String of Jade Jewels (Six Native American Songs), voice and guitar (1994), Doberman 306
- Do the Dead Know What Time it is? (poetry by Kenneth Patchen), voice and guitar (1996), Doberman 296
- And Yet..., flute, koto and guitar (flute and 2 guitars) (1997), Doberman 236
- Sevdalinka, 2 guitars and string quartet (1999), Doberman 406
- Byzantine Theme and Variations, guitar and string quartet (2002), Doberman 453
- Games, (poetry by Vasko Popa), voice, flute, guitar, bass and percussion (2) (2002), Doberman 465

Guitar and orchestra

- Concerto, guitar and string orchestra (1979), Doberman 400
- Prayers, 2 guitars and string orchestra (2005), Doberman 570
- Kaleidoscope, concerto for guitar and chamber ensemble (2008), Doberman 659
- No Feathers on This Frog, 2 guitars and symphonic orchestra (1990), Doberman 694
- Silence for guitar and orchestra (2015), Doberman 991

Miscellaneous

- A Journey Home, with Georgia Kelly, (1989) Global Pacific ON 54152
- Six Illuminations, piano (1994), Berben 3778
- Cantilena and Fantasia, piano (1995), Doberman 357
- Do the Dead Know What Time it is? (poetry by Kenneth Patchen), voice, flute, cello and piano (1996), Singidunum Music
- Balkan Mosaic, oboe, flute, violin, cello, keyboards and percussion (2000), Doberman 364
- Three Obfuscations, piano (2001), Doberman 397
- To Where Does the One Return?, 7 non- specified percussion instruments,(2001), Doberman 296
- Over the Face of the Water, piano 4 hands (2003), Singidunum Music
- Codex XV, string orchestra (2004), Doberman 486

== Critical and scholarly studies ==
- Kishimine, Hiroshi. A Close Look Into the Diverse World of Dusan Bogdanovic; discovering influences through analyses of selected solo guitar works. DMA diss., Shenandoah Conservatory, Virginia, 2007.
- Yen, Ruey Shyang, Exoticism in Modern Guitar Music: works of Carlo Domeniconi; Ravi Shankar; Benjamin Britten; Dusan Bogdanovic. DMA diss. Arizona State University, 1996.
- Curry, Jane, Balkan ecumene and synthesis in selected compositions for classical guitar by Bogdanovic, Mamangakis and Ian Krouse D.M.A. diss.Arizona State University 2010, 89 pages; AAT 3434345
- Hong Chu Tee, Modern Classical Guitar its use of Scordatura: a Historical Background and its Exploration from the Late Twentieth Century to the Present, A Dissertation submitted in partial fulfilment of the requirements of University of Glamorgan for the degree of MMus, 2012, pages 50–56
- Morey II, Michael J., A Pedagogical and Analytical Study of Dušan Bogdanović’s Polyrhythmic and Polymetric Studies for Guitar, diss. D.M.A., University of North Texas,2011
- García Álvarez, Ma. Carmen. "Dusan Bogdanovic (Serbia 1955 -) Eclecticismo musical en su obra para guitarra". Andalucía educa, no. 109. (Julio 2013) p. 8-9.
- Samuele Benvenuti," Jazz Sonata di Dusan Bogdanovic contestualizzazione e spunti analitici,"Università degli studi di Pavia, Laurea in musicologia, 2013-2014
- Clarysse Silke, Dušan Bogdanović, een componist in dialoog met de wereld; Etnologische invloeden op "Six Balkan Miniatures", "3 African Sketches" en op het oeuvre van Dušan Bogdanović in het algemeen. D. M. A., Leuven University College of Arts, 2014
- Counterpoint for Guitar, (Bèrben, 1996)
