= Jeffrey McFadden =

Canadian musician

Jeffrey McFadden is a Canadian classical guitarist, and a recording artist for Naxos Records. He is known for his recordings of works by composers of the romantic era such as Fernando Sor and Napoleon Coste. He has also recorded the works of the Paraguayan guitarist-composer Agustín Barrios, and the cello suites of J.S. Bach. He is also a noted editor and arranger, and wrote the standard text on guitar harmony Fretboard Harmony: Common Practice Harmony on the Guitar (d'OZ, 2010). His performances and recordings have received critical notice in major media outlets such as the London Daily Telegraph, The Ottawa Citizen, and Gramophone UK.

McFadden was born in 1963 in Hamilton, Ontario, Canada. He attended the University of Western Ontario, finishing first in his class in 1984. Later he attended the University of Toronto where he was an Eaton Graduate Fellow and studied under Norbert Kraft. He was a silver medalist in the 1992 Guitar Foundation of America competition. He is currently Head of Guitar Studies and Associate Professor in the Faculty of Music at the University of Toronto. In 2010, McFadden became the first ever graduate of the Doctor of Musical Arts degree program at the University of Toronto. McFadden is currently the artistic director of the Sauble Beach Guitar Festival.

== Discography ==
- Guitar Recital (Naxos 8.553401)
- Sor - Works for Solo Guitar Opp. 26–30 (Naxos 8.553451)
- Sor - Works for Solo Guitar Opp. 46–51 (Naxos 8.553985)
- Coste - Works for Solo Guitar (Naxos 8.554192)
- Coste - 25 études, Op. 38 (Naxos 8.554354)
- Riley and others - Music for Guitar and Flute (Naxos 8.559146)
- Barrios - Guitar Music vol.3 (Naxos 8.557807)
- J.S. Bach - Cello Suites Vol. 1 - Nos. 1-3, BWV 1007-1009 (Naxos 8.573625)
