= Denis Azabagić =

Bosnia and Herzegovina musician

- Born: 1972 (age 52–53); Tuzla, Socialist Republic of Bosnia and Herzegovina, Yugoslavia
- Genres: Classical
- Occupation: Guitarist
- Instrument: Guitar

Denis Azabagić (born 1972) is a Bosnian classical guitarist.

Denis Azabagić was born in Tuzla, Yugoslavia and is married to Eugenia Moliner (flutist).

== Musical background ==
In 1993, at the age of 20, he became the youngest winner of one of the most prestigious international guitar competitions Jacinto Guerrero and Inocencio Guerrero, in Madrid, Spain.

Between 1992 and 1999, Azabagić won twenty-four prizes in international competitions, of which eleven were first prizes including Alhambra International Guitar Competition in 1996 and Guitar Foundation of America International Concert Artist Competition in 1998.

In 1993 Denis Azabagić formed duo with a flutist Eugenia Moliner and as a member of the "Cavatina Duo" performed in concert halls and festivals in more than 30 countries.

He has written a book published by Mel Bay, On Competitions, based on his experience during these years.

Azabagić has recorded seven CDs for international labels such as Naxos, Cedille, Opera Tres and Orobroy as well as two DVDs for Mel Bay.

As a guest instrumentalist and soloist Azabagić has appeared with the Chicago Symphony Orchestra, Tallahassee Symphony Orchestra, Illinois Symphony Orchestra, Sacramento Chamber Orchestra, Madrid Symphony Orchestra, Orchestre Royal de Chambre de Wallonie, among others.

He has been a guest performer at Chicago's Symphony Center, Masters of the Guitar at the Royal Concertgebouw in Amsterdam, Radio France in Paris, Aix-en-Provence Festival, France, El Palau de la Musica, Valencia, Spain, Savannah on Stage, United States, Omni Foundation, USA, Ravinia Festival, USA, National Chang Kai Shek Cultural Center, Taiwan, and the National Center for the Performing Arts, Beijing, China.

Azabagić's performances have been broadcast live on radio (NPR, WFMT) and television in Asia, Europe and the United States.
