= Ekachai Jearakul =

Thai musician

- Also known as: Bird
- Born: 5 July 1987 (age 38); Ubon Ratchathani, Thailand
- Occupations: Guitar Performer, Guitarist
- Instruments: Matthias Dammann
- Members: Matthias Dammann
- Website: ekachaiguitarist.com

Ekachai Jearakul (born 5 July 1987) is a Thai classical guitarist.

Ekachai studied guitar with Kiattipong Tangsakul at Yamaha Ubonratchatani at age 13. He moved to Bangkok in 2003 to study at the College of Music, Mahidol University, where he studied with Worakarn Saengsomboon, Dr.Paul Cesarczyk and many other fine teachers at the university. He was awarded a scholarship to study at the College of Music at Mahidol University where he majored in classical guitar. He later completed and graduated his bachelor's degree in Classical Guitar Performance with first class honors in 2010. Ekachai was able to earn a good living as a student by teaching guitar and in competitions, winning the 2008 Berlin International Guitar Competition. During this time he attended numerous master classes where he met internationally renowned guitarists including Carlo Domeniconi, Álvaro Pierri, Scott Tennant, Shin-Ichi Fukuda, William Kanengiser, Pavel Steidl, Katona Twins and many others.

In late 2010, he received a scholarship to complete a master's degree in Classical Guitar Performance at the University Mozarteum in Salzburg, Austria with Professor Marco Tamayo. He attended many competitions around the world in Europe, Asia and America. Ekachai, representing Thailand in numerous classical guitar international competitions and concerts around the world with solo performances in Japan, China, South Korea, USA, France, Italy, United Kingdom, Russia and Greece. He played Joaquín Rodrigo's "Fantasia para un Gentilhombre" with Princess Galyani Vadhana Institute Orchestra conducted by Leo Phillips and with Thailand Philharmonic Orchestra in Bangkok, Thailand.

He has performed as a soloist with the Dr. Sax Chamber Orchestra, the International Orchestra of Italy, the Seoul Philharmonic Orchestra, the Unity Philharmonic Orchestra, and the Ukraine Philharmonic Orchestra.

== Awards ==
2010

- 3rd Prize of International Guitar Competition 2010 in Fiuggi Italy

2011

- 1st Prize in Luis Milan Competition 2011 in Spain

2014

- 1st Prize of the Guitar Foundation of America International Concert Artist Competition - June 25, 2014.
