= Sergei Dogadin =

Russian violinist (born 1988)

Sergei Dogadin (born September 1988) is a Russian violinist.

Born in a musical family, Dogadin began studying the violin at the age of six. He made his major debut in 2002 with Vasily Petrenko and the St. Petersburg Philharmonic Orchestra, and went on to perform with such conductors as Valery Gergiev, Yuri Temirkanov, Vladimir Ashkenazy, Vladimir Spivakov and Manfred Honeck and share the stage with such artists as Elisabeth Leonskaja, David Geringas, Denis Matsuev, Nikolay Sivchuk and Daniil Trifonov. Dogadin has won accolades in ten international competitions, including second prize (with no first prize awarded) at the Tchaikovsky International Competition in 2011, first prize at the International Joseph Joachim Violin Competition in Hanover in 2015, the second prize at the first Shanghai Isaac Stern Violin Competition in 2016, and the first prize at the Singapore International Violin Competition in 2018. In 2019, eight years after his second prize win in the 2011 Tchaikovsky Competition, Dogadin won the first prize in the 2019 Tchaikovsky International Competition.

Dogadin currently studies with Boris Kuschnir at the Music and Arts University in Vienna.
