= Marcin Dylla =

Polish classical guitarist

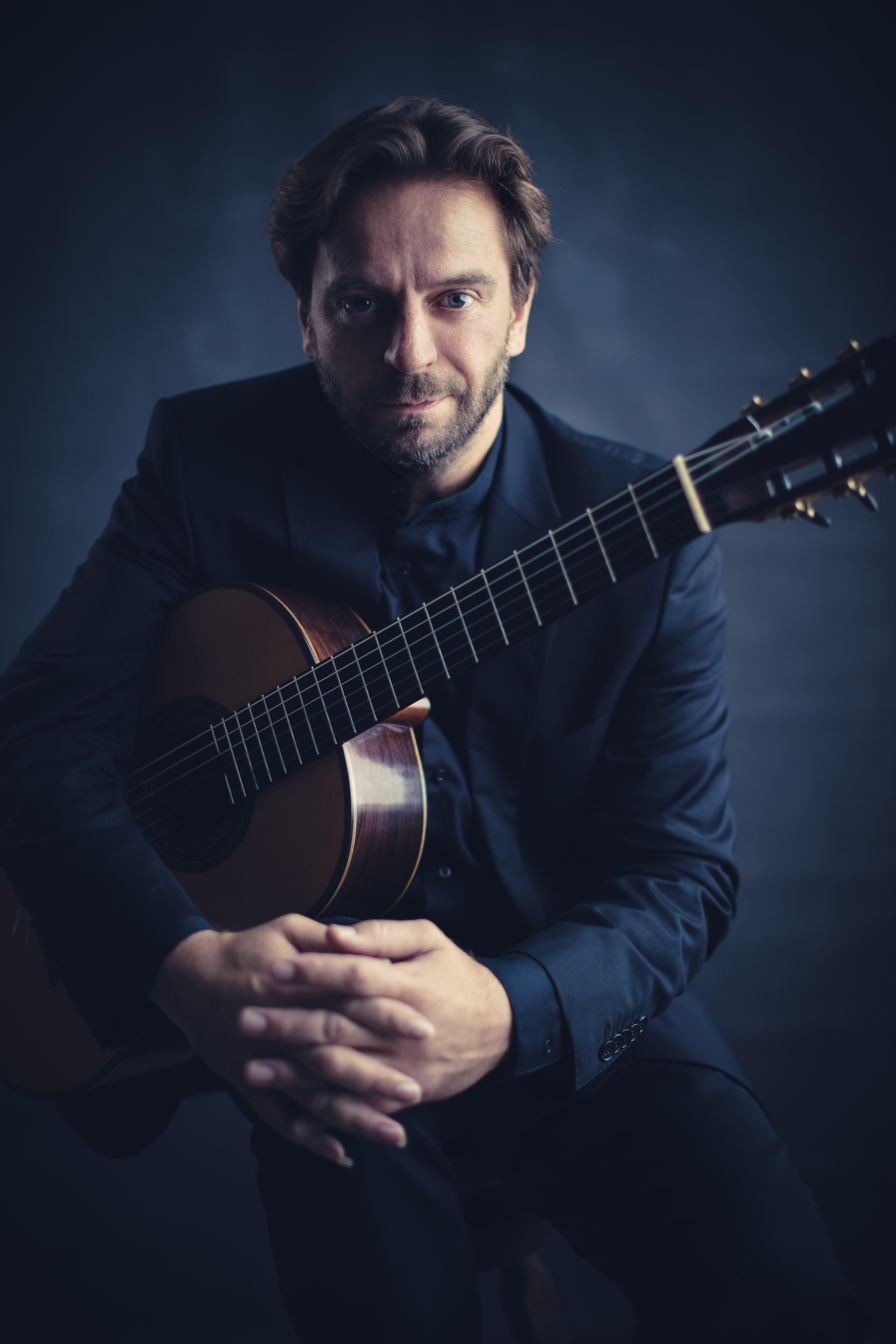
- Marcin Dylla by Łukasz Rajchert

Background information
- Born: 6 June 1976; Chorzów, Poland
- Genres: Classical
- Occupation: Musician
- Instrument: Classical guitar
- Labels: Naxos
- Website: www.marcindylla.com

Marcin Dylla is a Polish classical guitarist who has won over fifteen international classical guitar competitions.

He was born in Chorzów, Poland, and took lessons at the Ruda Śląska Music High School, attended the Academy of Music in Katowice, and academies in Basel, Freiburg, and Maastricht. His teachers included Oscar Ghiglia, Carlo Marchione, and Sonja Prunnbauer.

In 2007, he won the gold medal at the international hosted by the Guitar Foundation of America in Los Angeles, California.

== See also ==
- Michele Pittaluga International Classical Guitar Competition
- JoAnn Falletta International Guitar Concerto Competition
