= Ricardo Gallén =

Spanish guitarist (born 1972)

- Born: Ricardo Jesús Gallén García; March 12, 1972; Linares, Jaén, Spain
- Genre: Classical
- Occupation: Musician
- Instrument: Guitar
- Years active: 1990–present
- Labels: Naxos, Sunnyside, Eudora, Ibs
- Website: www.ricardogallen.com

Ricardo Jesús Gallén García (12 March 1972), is a Spanish classical guitarist who has been active since the mid-1990s. He is currently a professor of guitar at the Hochschule für Musik Franz Liszt, Weimar, Germany.

== Career ==
Gallén was born in Linares, Jaén, Spain in 1972. He started playing classical guitar at the age of four, performing in public just a year later. At the age of ten, he entered the Conservatory of Music in Cordoba, receiving his first formal music education by the Conservatory's director and founder Tomás Villajos Soler. He continued his studies at the Conservatories of Jaén, Cordoba, Madrid and Granada, studying under Professors Victor Valls, Miguel Barberá, Demetrio Ballesteros and Carmelo Martinez and at the same time he attended a number of master classes both in Spain and abroad. He studied guitar and ancient music at the Universities of Mozarteum University of Salzburg and Hochschule für Musik und Theater München, with the Masters Eliot Fisk, Christoph Eglhuber, Jürgen Hübscher and Joaquin Clerch. In 1999 he completed the Meisterklassendiplom (Konzertexam) in the Hochschule für Musik und Theater München, under Joaquin Clerch.

During the years 2001–2006, he worked as a professor in Ramon Llull University, Spain (Escola Luthier). He became an assistant professor in the class of Eliot Fisk in the Mozarteum University of Salzburg (2004–2009). He also served as a professor at the University of Extremadura, Spain (2005–2013) and was a guest professor in the Conservatories, Superior de Música en Palma de Mallorca and, Superior de Música de Aragón, Zaragoza, in Spain, during the years 2011–2013. Since 2009, Ricardo Gallén is a professor in the Hochschule für Musik "Franz Liszt", Weimar, Germany.

Gallén has given numerous recitals all over the world, in solo performances, duets, or with orchestras, under the direction of well known conductors, such as Maximiano Valdes, En Shao, Juan Jose Mena, Monica Huggett, Leo Brouwer, Jordi Savall and Seirgiu Comisiona, in more than 30 countries throughout Europe and America, including Mexico, Chile, Argentina, Cuba, USA, Costa Rica, Brazil, Australia, New Zealand, Russia, Norway, Denmark, Finland, Egypt, Jordan, Lebanon and Israel, in important concert halls like the Royal Concertgebouw in Amsterdam, National National Auditorium of Music, in Madrid, L'Auditori and Palau de la Música Catalana in Barcelona, Shostakovich Hall in Saint Petersburg and Tchaikovsky Hall in Moscow.

Gallén has been a member of the jury in several International Guitar Competitions and has given a number of master classes in several countries including Austria, Germany, Poland, Israel, USA, Chile, Lebanon, Portugal, Mexico, Norway, Russia, Slovakia, France, Greece, Romania, Spain, Finland, France, Australia, and New Zealand.

His first album, was one of Naxos Records best-selling albums in 2001 and received sensational reviews in the specialized press. It was followed by five more albums published by Naxos, in which he performs music by Mauro Giuliani, Leo Brouwer, Toru Takemitsu, etc., as well as all of the concerts for guitar and orchestra by the Spanish Maestro Joaquin Rodrigo. In 2013 his double CD with the Bach Complete Lute Suites was released with Sunnyside Records and in May 2014 his last CD, Fernando Sor – Guitar Sonatas was released, by Eudora Records.

He has also recorded for Radio and Television in various countries including Spain, Finland, Belgium, Romania, Germany, Cuba, Mexico, South Korea and Bulgaria.

Ricardo Gallén plays a classical guitar by Paco Santiago Marín and a romantic guitar by Arnoldo García with Savarez Alliance Strings.

== Awards and recognition ==
Gallén has participated in over twenty international guitar competitions, having won five first prize awards including: the 32nd Markneukirchen International Instrumental Competition (1997), the 14th Andrés Segovia International Classical Guitar Competition (1998), where he also got a Special Prize, the Fourth Alhambra International Guitar Competition (1998), the 33rd Francisco Tarrega International Guitar Contest (1999), where he also got the Special Audience Prize and the 11th International Guitar Competition (2002), where he also got five special prizes.

== Discography ==
- Sor: Guitar Sonatas (Eudora)
- Bach: Complete Lute Works (Sunnyside)
- Tales · Diego Barber (Sunnyside)
- Giuliani: Variations (Naxos)
- Guitar Recital: Ricardo Gallen (Naxos)
- Regondi: Airs Varies / Reverie, Op. 19 / Mertz: Bardenklange, Op. 13 (Naxos)
- Rodrigo: Concierto de Aranjuez / Concierto Andaluz (Complete Orchestral Works, Vol. 2) (Naxos)
- Rodrigo Concierto Madrigal / Concierto para una Fiesta (Complete Orchestral Works, Vol. 5) (Naxos)
- Rodrigo: Joaquin Rodrigo – A Portrait (Naxos)
- Adagio Chillout (Naxos)
- Classical Chillout – The Essential Collection (Naxos)
