= Doberman-Yppan =

Les Éditions Doberman-Yppan (Doberman-Yppan) is a Canadian music publishing firm. The company's headquarters is based in Lévis, Quebec. The publishing company was acquired in 2010 by Canadian publisher Les Productions d’OZ.

== Notable publications ==
- Prelude and Fugue by Marc-André Hamelin
- Concerto for Guitar and string orchestra by Jacques Hétu
- Suite pour guitare by Jacques Hétu
- Works of Welsh composer Stephen Goss
- All published arrangements by David Russell
- More than 125 guitar works by Roland Dyens
- Many recent works by Sergio Assad
