= Dario Sotelo =

Dario Sotelo Calvo (born in São José do Rio Preto, 1960), known artistically as Dario Sotelo, is a Brazilian conductor and music educator known for his leadership in symphonic wind music. Throughout his career, he has directed major ensembles, commissioned and premiered works by Brazilian composers, and promoted educational initiatives that influenced generations of musicians. His international activity includes guest appearances in the Americas, Europe, Asia, and Africa, as well as serving as President of the World Association of Symphonic Bands and Ensembles (WASBE).

== Early life and education ==
Sotelo graduated with degrees in piano, violin, and viola, and earned his master's degree in orchestral conducting from City University of London, where he studied under Ezra Rachlin, one of Fritz Reiner's disciples. He enrolled in the Conservatory of Tatuí in 1983.

== Career ==
Sotelo served as coordinator of the strings department at the Conservatory of Tatuí from 1988 to 1991 and from 1998 to 2003, where he restructured the string instrument course programs and integrated them with chamber music and orchestra activities at equivalent levels.

He created and established youth orchestras in Tatuí, Belo Horizonte, and São Paulo.

After two years in London (1991 and 1992), he was invited to take on the direction of the Brazilian Wind Orchestra and establish the instrumental conducting course at the Conservatory of Tatuí. From 1998 until 2003, he became the conductor of the newly created Paulista Symphony Orchestra at the Conservatory of Tatuí.

As a clinician and guest conductor, he participated in dozens of international activities, including the Brazilian Music Festival in Wattwill, Switzerland, recordings for Hungarian State Radio, and tours in the United States and Spain. He also performed at the Minnesota State Convention in Minneapolis, at the University of Duluth, and at the Berklee College of Music in Boston. Additionally, he conducted as a guest in Hungary, Australia, Germany, England, Spain, South Africa, Colombia, Uruguay, Costa Rica, Paraguay, Argentina, Taiwan, and China. In Brazil, he conducted in Curitiba, São Paulo, Rio de Janeiro, Belo Horizonte, Blumenau, Caxias do Sul, Porto Alegre, and festivals such as in Campos do Jordão, São João del-Rei, Sesc-Pelotas, the Divinópolis Winter Festival (MG), and the Music Workshop of Curitiba. In 2023, he also conducted and mentored musicians and students in the United States.

He established the Ibero-American Conference of Composers, Arrangers, and Conductors of Symphonic Bands in Tatuí and served as its General and Artistic Coordinator in 2002 and 2004. He was Secretary-General of the IV Ibero-American Congress of Composers, Arrangers, and Conductors of Symphonic Bands in Tenerife, Spain, in 2013, and in Llíria, Spain.

He was Artistic Director and Conductor of the Brazilian Wind Orchestra of the Conservatory of Tatuí for 25 years, recording seven CDs featuring works by various Brazilian composers. As of 2025, he has conducted 150 world premieres of works by Brazilian composers and 98 Brazilian premieres of international composers.

In July 2011, he conducted the World Wind Orchestra at the 15th WASBE Conference in Taiwan.

He served as a jury member at the International Band Competition "Ciudad de Valencia" in 2003, 2010, and 2019.

He was a member of the WASBE (World Association of Symphonic Bands and Ensembles) Board from 2002 to 2008 and its President from 2017 to 2019. In 2019, he organized and coordinated the WASBE World Conference in Buñol, Spain.

In 2022, he served as President of the First Ibero-American Band Forum in Buñol, Spain.

In 2023, he was invited to establish the First Conducting Course in Cheste, Spain, conducting the second course in 2024. Also, in 2024, he participated in the Sarzedo Music Festival (MG), the Wind Band Festival in Sichuan, China and at the University of St. Thomas Band Festival in Saint Paul, Minnesota.

== Works and productions ==
Through the Conservatory of Tatuí, he commissioned and premiered numerous works by Brazilian composers, including the opera "A Peste e o Intrigante" by Mario Ficarelli, "Cantata de Natal" by Ernest Mahler, and "Sonho de Uma Noite de Verão" by Edson Beltrami.

He has written several musical productions for children, youth, and adults, including "Retratos", "Villa-Lobos Encontra Guarnieri", "Vinda da Família Real para o Brasil", "Villa-Lobos e o Momoprece", "Sonho de Criança", "As Estórias de Petrushka", "O Tango e Suas Histórias", "As Estórias do Tião", and "Mambos, Boleros e Chá-chá-chás".

During the centennial celebrations of The Rite of Spring in 2013, he carried out the "Stravinsky Project," featuring performances of original works for symphonic winds influenced by The Rite and a concert dedicated to a complete transcription of the iconic ballet.

In 2013, he organized and coordinated the First National Seminar on Symphonic Band Conducting, an event repeated over four more editions in subsequent years, mobilizing over 1,200 participants from across Brazil and South America. He also continues to teach conducting workshops and courses for young conductors across Brazil.

In 2014, he organized and coordinated the First National Week of Band Composition, the Tatuí Winter Festival "Summer Course," and the National Composition Competition for Bands. He debuted as Guest Conductor of the Madrid Municipal Symphonic Band and contributed to the series "Teaching Music Through Performance in Band" with the chapter on "Danzón No.2" by Arturo Márquez.

== Awards and honors ==
In 2020, he received the "Distinción Pare Antoni" from the Ateneo Música y Enseñanza "Banda Primitiva de Llíria," the oldest musical society in Spain.

As a guest of the Valencia Municipal Symphonic Band, he conducted a concert honoring Vicente Mas Quiles in December 2021, where he received the "Pare Antoni Award" in Llíria, Spain.

== Articles ==
- A Música e Seu Tempo (1998)
- Música – Linguagem da Razão e Emoção (1998)
- Ouvir Música (1998)
- Porque a Música é Universal (1999)
- Música e Compositores Sudamericanos – Variedade de Sotaques (WASBE Magazine, Spanish and English, 2002)
- Repertório Sudamericano para Sopros (WASBE Magazine, Spanish and English, 2003)
- Repertório Brasileiro para Sopros (WASBE Magazine, Spanish and English, 2004)
- Obras Brasileiras para Saxofone e Orquestra (CD booklet, esp. e ing., 2004)
- O Brasil na Obra Sinfônica de Hudson Nogueira (2005)
- Edson Beltrami e o Universalismo Brasileiro (2006)
- Antônio Meneses – Influenciando Novas Gerações (Revista Piauí, 2006)
- Tabela de Parâmetros Técnicos e Musicais de Classificação do Repertório de Sopros e Banda Sinfônica (capítulo do Pequeno Guia Prático para o Regente de Banda, Funarte, 2007)
- Proposta de Adaptação aos Ritmos Brasileiros (capítulo do Manual da Funarte, 2007)
- Rumos da Música Erudita no Brasil (Gazeta do Povo, Curitiba, 12 January 2008)
- Panorama dos Sopros e Percussão no Brasil (2008)
