= Rafael Serrallet =

Spanish classical guitarist (born 1971)

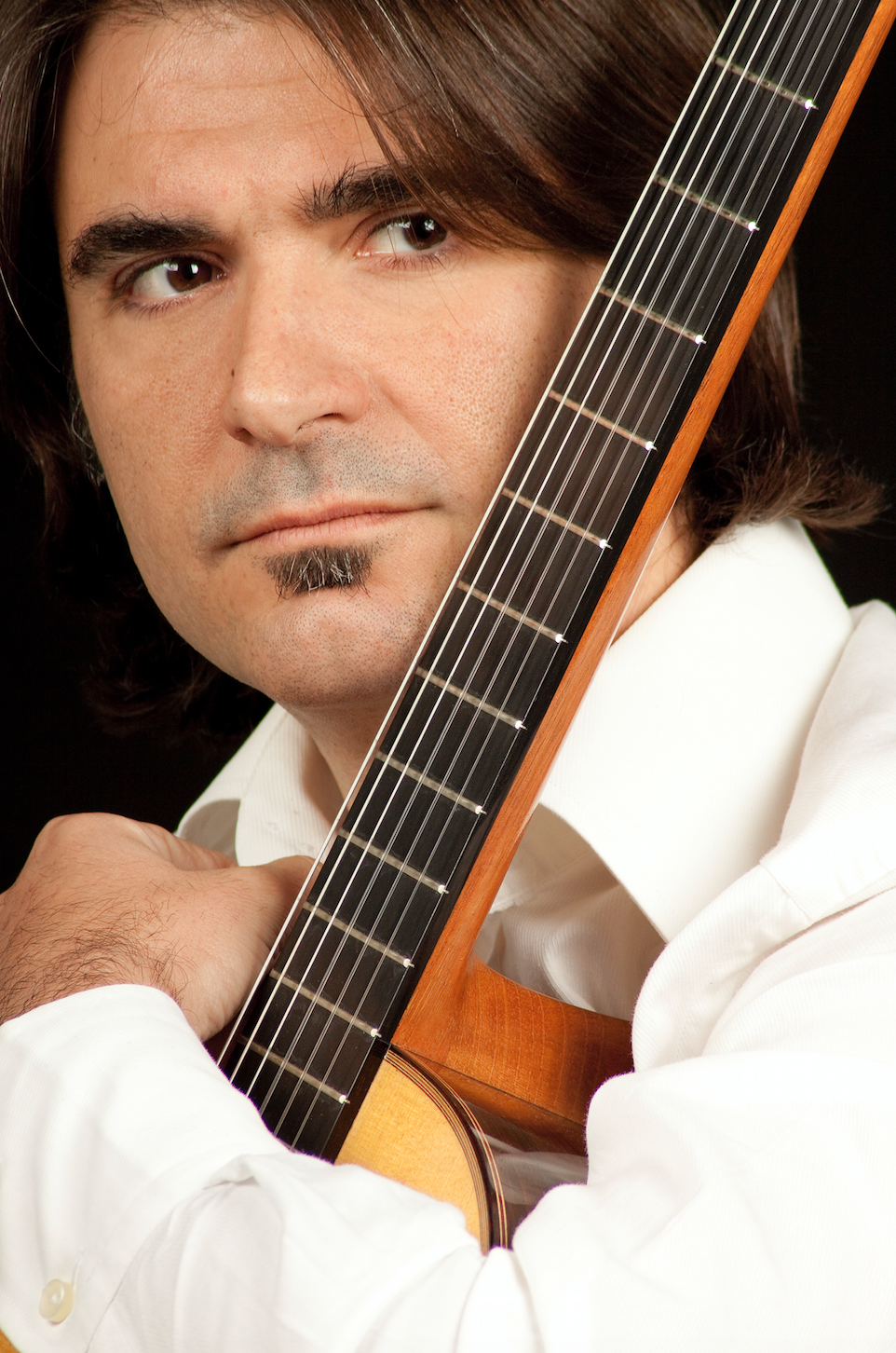
- Serrallet in 2015
- Born: 14 July 1971 (age 55); Valencian Community, Spain
- Occupation: Guitarist
- Years active: 1992 - present
- Website: serrallet.com

Rafael Serrallet (born in Valencia, Spain on July 14, 1971) is a Spanish classical guitarist.

== Career ==
Rafael Serrallet was born in Valencia and started playing the guitar at the age of 12.

Serrallet studied with Andres Segovia’s pupil and assistant, José Tomás; he also attended the Spanish Academy in Rome; and received a doctorate in music (PhD) by the Universidad Politecnica de Valencia, and a Master of Education by the UNED.

During his 2018 world tour, Serrallet became the first classical musician to play in all seven continents, including Antarctica, in one year.

As a soloist performer, Serrallet has played with orchestras such as the Malaysian Philharmonic Orchestra, the Panama Symphony Orchestra, the Philharmonic of Morocco, the Novosibirsk Chamber Orchestra, the Transylvania State Philharmonic Orchestra, the Czech Sinfonietta and the Ukraine Philharmonic.

Besides being an acclaimed soloist, he also performs chamber music. His curiosity as a musician has led him to collaborate in cross-over projects with musicians from around the world. He has recorded many different CDs as a soloist, with orchestras, and with different chamber music groups.

== Guinness World Record ==
Rafael Serrallet set a Guinness World Record in 2018 for being the first musician to play a concert on each continent in 154 days and 22 hours. The concerts were hold at Chicago (USA), Kuala Lumpur (Malaysia), Christchurch (New Zealand), Ushuaia (Argentina), Neko Harbour (Antarctica), Oviedo (Spain), and Mombasa (Kenya).

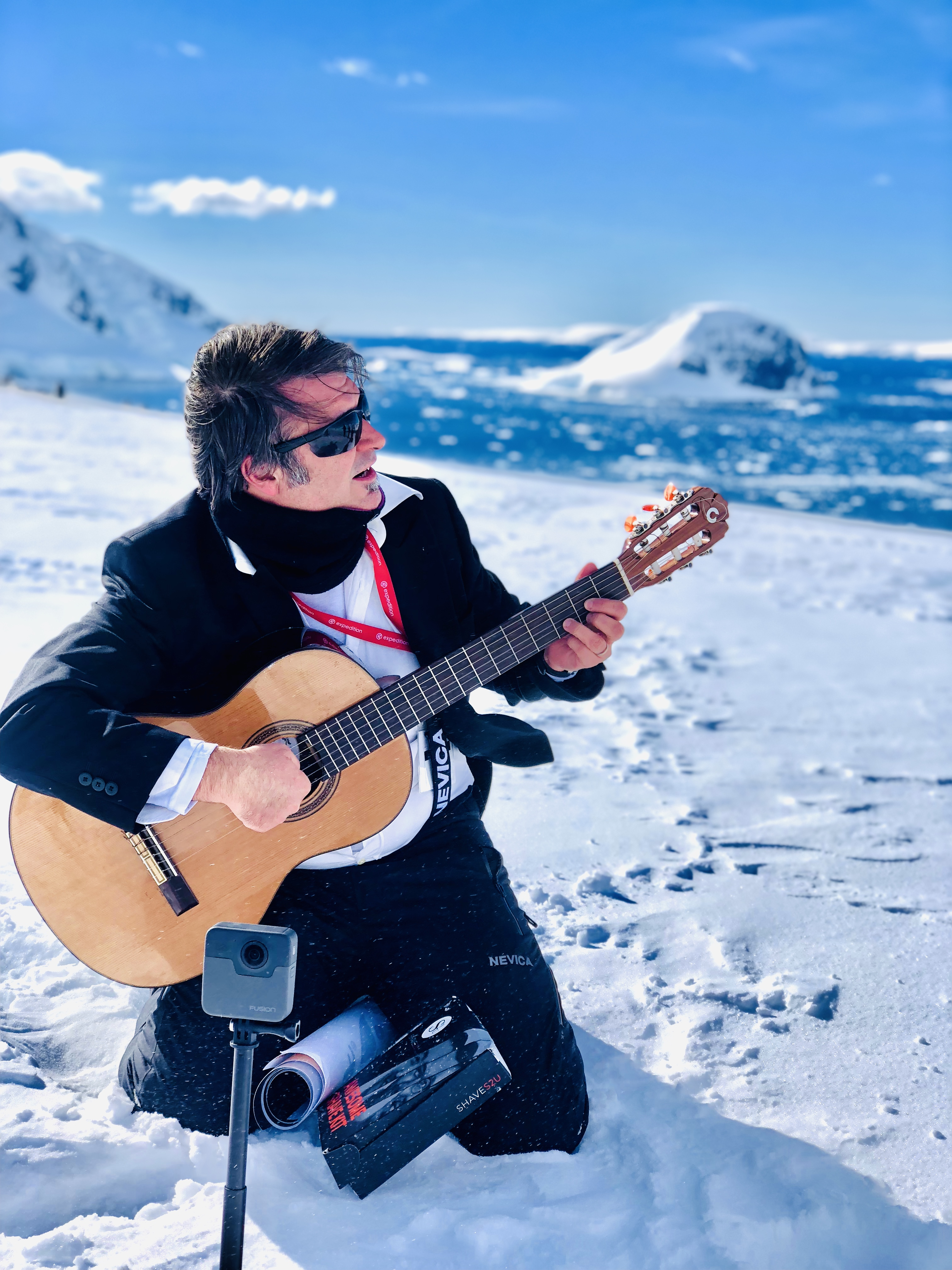
Rafael Serrallet in Antarctica in 2018.

== Teacher ==
Rafael Serrallet has been a resident teacher in Santiago de Compostela Conservatory and Conservatory of Lliria in Spain and today teaches master classes in universities and conservatories throughout the world. He has also been a judge on the panel for international music competitions. Rafael has been the Director of the International Iberian Musical Institute, which developed musical projects with schools and conservatories around the world. He has conducted master classes throughout including: the University of Zagreb, University Santo Tomas of Manila, University Sultan Qaboos in Oman, Hannover University, University Teknologi Mara in Malaysia, Conservatory of Pardubice, the network of National Conservatories in Morocco, Yared Music School in the Addis Ababa University, Edward Saïd Conservatory in Jerusalem, National Conservatory of Peru, Hokoriku University (Japan), Conservatory of the UPOLI in Nicaragua, Honduras National Music School, Conservatory of the Universidad Católica de Asunción (Paraguay), Conservatoire of Kenya to name but a few.

== Charitable outreach ==
Serrallet has worked with music pedagogical projects with disadvantaged children’s groups in Morocco, the Middle East, West Bank, countries in Africa, Central and South America and parts of Asia

He has participated in outreach activities at hospitals, prisons, schools and refugee camps. He also plays in benefit concerts in order to raise funds for campaigns such climate change, cancer, and gender violence.

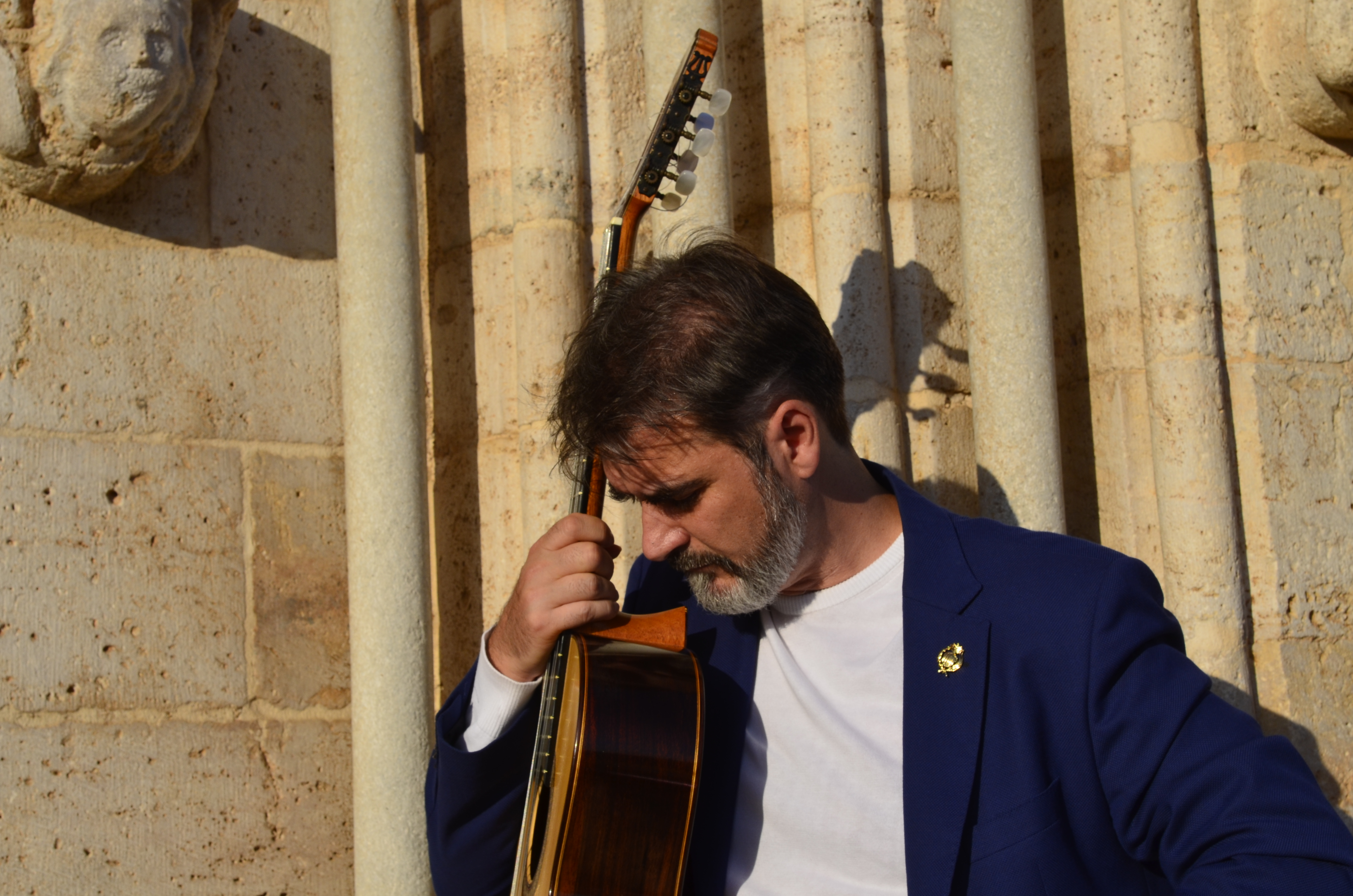
Rafael Serrallet in La Sang church in Lliria (Valencia) in 2020
