= Damian Vidagany =

Spanish journalist (born 1974)

Damià Vidagany
Personal information
- Full name: Damià Vidagany Igual
- Date of birth: 1974 (age 51–52)
- Place of birth: Llíria, Spain

Managerial career
- Years: Team
- 2008–2017: Valencia (chief media officer)
- 2023–: Aston Villa (Director of Football Operations)

Damià Vidagany Igual (born 1974) also known as Damian Vidagany is a Spanish football executive and former journalist who is the director of football operations of Aston Villa.

== Career ==
Vidagany worked as a journalist for Spanish media outlet Nou Ràdio. During the summer of 2008, he was appointed chief media officer of Spanish La Liga side Valencia. Following his stint there, he was appointed director of football operations of English Premier League side Aston Villa ahead of the 2023–24 season.

== Personal life ==
Vidagany was born in 1974 in Llíria, Spain. Growing up, he aspired to become a professional basketball player. Nicknamed "Dami", he has been friends with Spanish football manager Unai Emery.
