= José Tomás =

Spanish musician (1934–2001)

José Tomás, c. 1955

José Tomás Pérez Sellés (26 August 1934, in Alicante – 7 August 2001) was a Spanish classical guitarist and teacher. Considered a major influence on the evolution of classical guitar technique in the second half of the 20th century, he trained many guitarists from all over the world.

== Biography ==
José Tomás began his musical studies with Óscar Esplá. He would later transcribe Esplá's piano suite, Levante, for the guitar as well as re-discover and transcribe Esplá's previously unknown work, Tempo di Sonata. The sonata, originally composed for the harp, was given its first performance in 1978 by Tomás himself. Tomás was initially a self-taught guitarist, but then continued his studies with Regino Sainz de la Maza, Emilio Pujol, and Alirio Diaz. On Diaz's recommendation, he went to study with Andrés Segovia in Siena. After Siena he continued his training with Segovia in 1958 and 1959 at Música en Compostela, and served as Segovia's assistant there.

In 1961 he won first prize at the Concurso Internacional de Guitarra in Ourense founded by Segovia, after which he primarily dedicated himself to teaching in his native city, where he was Professor of Guitar at the Conservatorio Superior de Música "Óscar Esplá", a post which he held for two decades. From 1964 until the mid-1970s, he also took over from Segovia as director of Música en Compostela.

As a concert performer, Tomás was known for his enviable sound and interpretative skill. He was also known for his transcriptions, especially those of scores from the Renaissance and Baroque eras. This in turn led him to adopt an eight string guitar, developed for him by José Ramírez III. The two extra strings allowed him to play music originally composed for the vihuela and lute on a modern guitar without sacrificing any notes. However, his primary contribution was to guitar pedagogy. "Pragmatic and erudite, but at the same time humble", he received a constant stream of guitarists who visited his home in Alicante seeking his advice. Amongst the classical guitarists who studied with Tomás are David Russell, Raphaella Smits, Thomas Müller-Pering, Ahmet Kanneci, Cornel Imry, Edson Lopes, Yoshimi Otani, Ignacio Rodes, Rafael Serrallet, Carles Trepat, Mario Caserta, Edoardo Catemario, Jonathan Baker, Klaus Helminen, Jim Frazee, Patrick Gaudi, Bauke Oosterhuit, Luis Diego Martin, Alex de Valera, Masahiro Umemoto, Ichiro Suzuki, Spencer Burleson, Eric Madriguera, Benjamin Bolt, Ross Benavides, Philip Rosheger, Tom Johnson, Bryan Townsend, Marco Antonio Anguiano, Ryuhei Kobayashi, Baltazar Benitez and Jesús Castro-Balbi.

The Conservatorio Profesional de Música "Guitarrista José Tomás" in Alicante is named in his honour, as is an international classical guitar competition, the Concurso Internacional de Guitarra Clásica "José Tomás - Villa de Petrer".
