= Thomas Müller-Pering =

German classical guitarist (born 1958)

Thomas Müller-Pering (born 1958 in Cologne) is a classical guitarist from Germany. He studied under Prof. Tadashi Sasaki at the Hochschule für Musik Köln and performed in the master classes of John Williams, José Tomás, Oscar Ghiglia and Siegfried Behrend. In 1983 he was awarded 1st Prize in the "Concurso internacional de ejecución musical" in Viña del Mar, Chile. He has concertized throughout Europe, North and South-America, Africa and Asia. His numerous recordings include a collaboration with Manuel Barrueco with whom he recorded the "Danzas Españolas" by Enrique Granados for EMI. He taught at the Hochschule für Musik Köln from 1980 to 1998. He began teaching at the Hochschule für Musik "Franz Liszt" Weimar in 1994 becoming a full professor at this school in 1997.

== Discography ==
- Gitarren von Richard Jacob Weißgerber (1877–1960) gespielt von Thomas Müller-Pering (Instrumentarium Lipsiense - Vol. 4)

(recorded 28.8. - 3.9.2000) (see 6th item) (CD Raumklang 2006)

- Anton Diabelli (1781–1858) Guitar Duos - Johannes Tappert, Thomas Müller-Pering

(MDG 603 1389-2 MDG-Musikproduktion Dabringhaus und Grimm)

- Falla / Granados - Second guitar with Manuel Barrueco on the Granados works (recorded 1993/1997) (EMI)
- Guitar Classics (Sheetmusic with CD, 1996) (Gerig Musikverlag)
