= Héctor García (guitarist) =

Hector Garcia
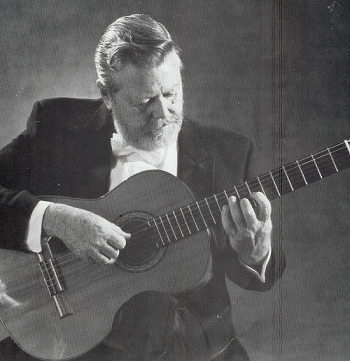

Background information
- Born: Hector Antonio Garcia Hernandez; 19 November 1930; Havana, Cuba
- Died: 15 July 2022 (aged 91) Boise, Idaho
- Genre: Classical
- Occupation: Musician
- Instrument: Classical guitar

Héctor Antonio García Hernandez (November 19, 1930 - July 15, 2022) was a Cuban-American classical guitarist and composer. He established the first guitar departments in United States universities, at the College of St. Joseph on the Rio Grande in 1963 and the University of New Mexico at Albuquerque in 1967, where he taught for about 20 years.

== Biography ==
García was born in Havana, Cuba. He received Master of Guitar and Master of Music degrees from the Peyrellade Conservatory, joining their faculty upon graduation in 1954.

He chose to leave Cuba to escape the communist regime at the age of 30, buying a two-way ticket from Havana to Miami, Florida (but using only one part of the ticket). He sought and was granted asylum in the United States with the support of family and friends. He returned to Cuba as part of the unsuccessful Bay of Pigs Invasion, was captured, and was imprisoned. In prison, he worked on the first of two unpublished concertos, and convinced his captors to "find him a guitar". With this guitar, he formed a makeshift studio in prison with other students. Some went on to become accomplished musicians and professors.

After two years of imprisonment, García was released ($50,000 was paid by the Kennedy administration to Fidel Castro and returned to the U.S., where they became a concert guitarist and educator, performing worldwide with major orchestras, including the Havana Symphony, Los Angeles Sinfonietta, New Mexico Symphony Orchestra, and the Dupont Consortium in Washington D.C. He appeared on The Ed Sullivan Show and founded the first academic department dedicated to classical guitar at the University of New Mexico. Mario Castelnuovo-Tedesco dedicated a composition (Op. 170/39) Cancion Cubana to Hector Garcia.

García studied with Emilio Pujol (a pupil of Francisco Tárrega) and he was appointed assistant in 1969, not only to improve his mastery of the guitar and vihuela but also to help Pujol develop musical materials and notes and to conduct master classes attended by advanced students and performing artists worldwide. García adopted and expanded upon the traditions of both Tárrega and Pujol. Some of these influences led him to adopt a "no-nails" approach to guitar playing, which runs counter to the contemporary trend in classical guitar for players to grow the nails of the right hand used to pluck strings. The nails are grown and shaped to optimize sound production, but in the "no-nails" approach, the nails are cut short so that fingertips contact the string directly. The technique produces a sound that has a distinctive, softer characteristic, although the control is often more difficult, especially in passages requiring a rapid arpeggio or tremolo technique. The "no-nails" approach remains controversial amongst contemporary classical guitarists.

His grandson, Jeffrey Alexander, is a guitarist for the metal band Ascendence and also releases solo music. He is a musician within the family of Hector.

Garcia married Jeanne Marie Baum November 12, 1988. He last resided with his family in Idaho (he previously lived in Albuquerque, New Mexico and Miami, Florida).
