= Edoardo Catemario =

Italian classical guitarist

Edoardo Catemario

Edoardo Catemario (born 25 September 1965) is an Italian classical guitarist.

== Biography ==
Edoardo Catemario was born in Naples. He studied guitar with Salvatore Canino, Antimo Pedata, José Tomás, Stefano Aruta and Maria Luisa Anido, piano and analysis with Titina De Fazio and the South American composers Leo Brouwer and Oscar Casares. At the age of 11 gave his first solo recital.

In January 1991 Catemario was the first prize winner of the "Andrés Segovia" guitar competition in Almuñécar, and in 1992 of the Michele Pittaluga International Classical Guitar Competition in Alessandria.

His performances include the romantic repertoire (played on original instruments), baroque, 20th-century music, contemporary and avant-garde music, and include solo, chamber works and concertos for guitar and orchestra. He has performed across Europe, the United States and South America in venues such as the Grosser Saal of the Wiener Musikverein (Vienna), Auditorio Nacional de Musica (Madrid), St John's and the Royal Academy of Music (London), Weill Hall at Carnegie Hall (New York City), Cité de la Musique (Paris), Teatro Coliseo (Buenos Aires), and the Musikhalle Hamburg. He is frequently invited as a guest soloist by various orchestras, and has collaborated with many of the world's chamber musicians. Catemario has recorded for the Decca, ARTS Music, and Koch Schwann labels.

As a teacher, he has held master classes in Europe and the United States. He has taught at the Accademia Musicale di Firenze since 2006. He is also a visiting professor at the Royal Academy of Music (London) and taught in the "Sommer Akademie" of the Salzburg Mozarteum from 2001 to 2007.

Catemario is the artistic director of Associazione QuattroQuarti, which organizes several music festivals in Italy. He owns and plays on his collection of old instruments dated between 1890 and 1935.

== Recordings ==
- Recuerdos (Decca)
- Bach for guitar (Decca)
- Conciertango (ARTS Music)
- Mauro Giuliani Concerto for Guitar and Orchestra No. 3, Gran Quintetto for Guitar and Strings, Variations for Guitar and String Quartet (ARTS Music)
- Mauro Giuliani Concertos for guitar and Orchestra n 1 & 2. (ARTS Music)
- Italian Virtuoso (ARTS Music)
- Guitar XX (ARTS Music)
- Astor Piazzolla complete works with guitar. (ARTS Music)
- Guitar Concertos (ARTS Music)
- Barocco Napoletano (ARTS Music)
- Spanish guitar music (ARTS Music)
- Concierto Sefaradi (Koch Schwann) (no longer available)
