= Carles Trepat =

Spanish classical guitarist (born 1960)

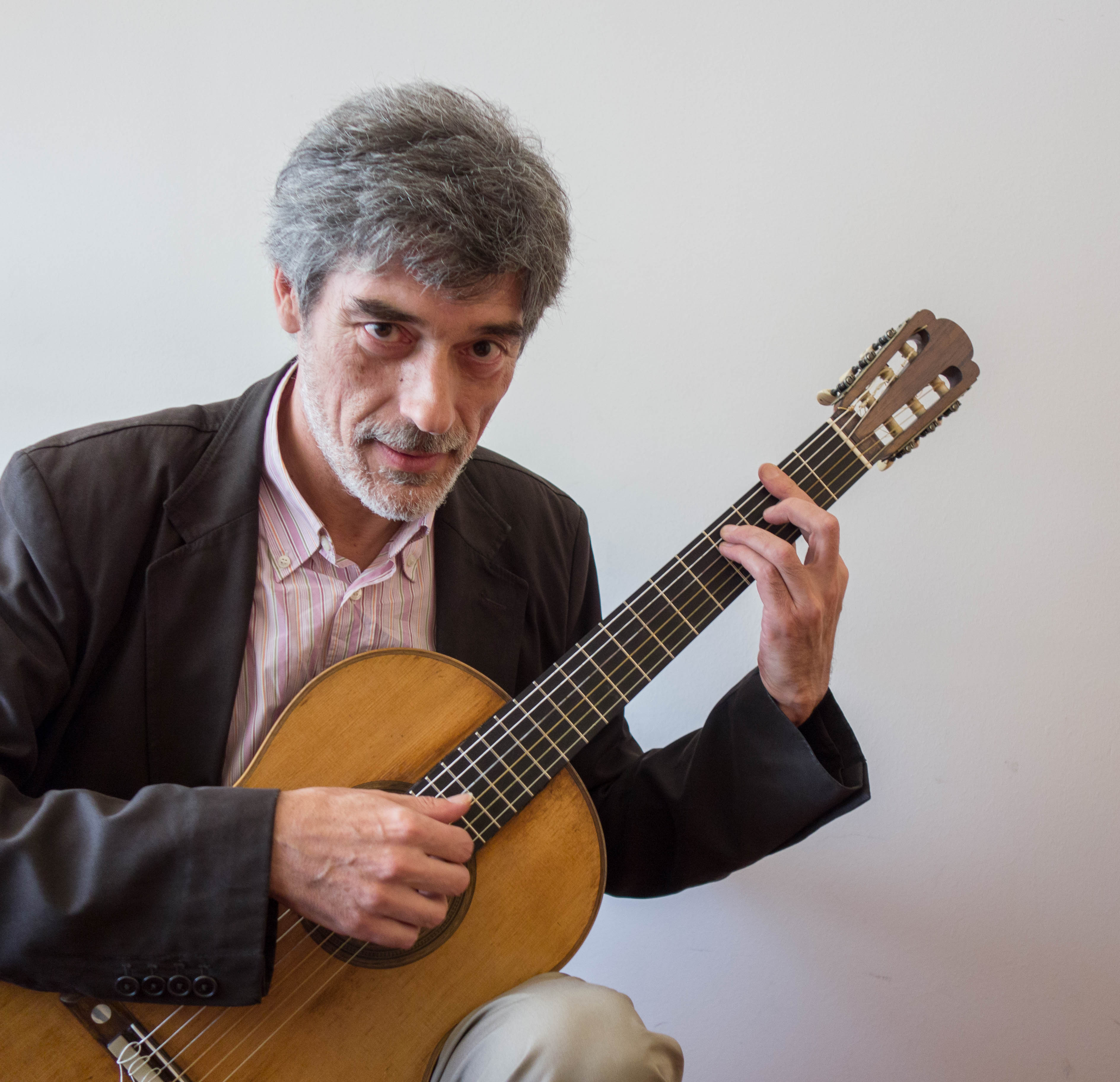
Carles Trepat, guitarist

Carles Trepat (born 1960) is a Spanish classical guitarist. He has won several international prizes, including the "Premio Tárrega" in the "Certamen Internacional Francisco Tárrega de Benicàssim". In July 2014, he was awarded with the "Honorific Prize José Tomás" in Petrer.

Trepat was born in Lérida (Spain) in 1960, where he started studying guitar when he was thirteen with Jordi Montagut. In 1976, he attended the last classical guitar course given by Emilio Pujol who was a student of Francisco Tárrega. Some of his other teachers were José Tomás, Alberto Ponce, Eduardo Sainz de la Maza and Rafael Andia.

Trepat was an assistant professor of José Tomás and he usually plays with historical guitars made by luthiers like Antonio Torres, Joseph Pagés, Santos Hernández, Hermanos Conde or modern guitars build by José Luis Romanillos and Daniel Bernaert. Some of his latest performances were given with real gut and silk strings on his 1892 Antonio Torres guitar.

He is credited for discovering and playing music of Miguel García -Padre Basilio-, who was Dionisio Aguado's teacher. Some of his CD recordings include music by Federico Mompou, Manuel Quiroga, Isaac Albéniz, Enrique Granados, Francisco Tárrega, Julián Arcas, Antonio José and Miguel Llobet among others.

== Discography ==
- "Música espanyola per a guitarra" CD, La mà de guido, 1995
- "Llora la Guitarra" Maestro Quiroga/Carles Trepat CD, Nuevos Medios, 1999
- "El Romancero Gitano i 10 Cançons Tradicionals" Carles Trepat, Jordi Casas Bayer Cor De Cambra Del Palau De La Musica Catalana CD, Discmedi, 1999
- "Carles Trepat interpreta Frederic Mompou" CD, ZANFONIA, 2000
- "El Albaicín" CD, Nuevos Medios, 2007
- "Boccherini: La musica notturna delle strade di Madrid" Cuarteto Casals, Carles Trepat, Eckart Runge. CD Harmonia Mundi 2011
- "Granados-LLobet: ...100 anys d'un viatge" Carles Trepat. 2015
- "Quiroga. Versiones a la guitarra de la copla por Carles Trepat" Double CD, EMEC, 2015
