= Ignacio Rodes =

Spanish Classical guitarist

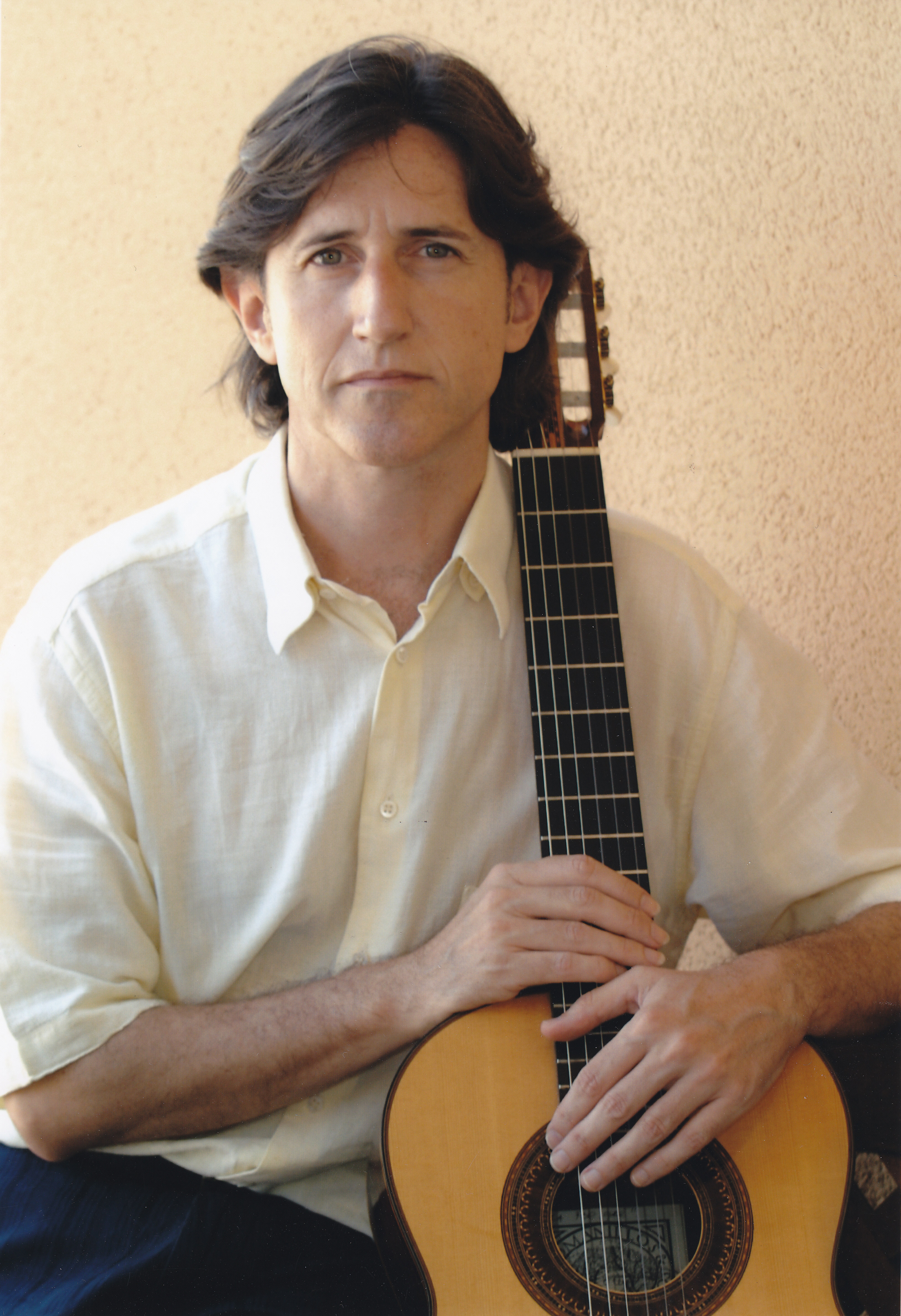
Ignacio Rodes, Spanish Classical guitarist

Ignacio Rodes (born 24 August 1961 in Alicante, Spain) is a Spanish Classical guitarist.

== Biography ==
Ignacio Rodes started the guitar studies with his mother when he was 8, then went to the Conservatory of Alicante where he studied with José Tomás, participating in international courses taught by David Russell, Manuel Barrueco and John Williams, among others. Between 1983 and 1986, with a scholarship from the British Council and the Spanish Ministry of Culture, he studied early music and the instrumental music of J. S. Bach in London. Ignacio Rodes is currently Professor of the Conservatory of Alicante and director in the Guitar Master of Guitar Performance the University of Alicante.

== Career ==
Since his debut at London's Wigmore Hall in 1986, his career developed rapidly, leading to appearances at international festivals across most European countries, as well as in the United States, South America, China, Japan, Turkey, and Vietnam

He has performed in major concert halls around the world: Alte Oper (Frankfurt), Alice Tully Hall-Lincoln Centre (New York), Performing Arts Centre (San Francisco), Tonhalle Maag (Zurich), Grand Philharmonic Hall (St Petersburg), Kolarac Hall (Belgrade), Roetke Auditorium (Seattle), Chopin Museum (Warsaw), Palau de la Música Catalana in Barcelona, Auditorio Nacional in Madrid, Patio de los Arrayanes (La Alhambra, Granada), Chillida Leku Museum (San Sebastián), Sala Nezahualcoyotl (Mexico City), Cairo Opera House, Damascus Opera House (Syria), Saigon Opera House (Vietnam), Yamaha Concert Hall (Osaka), etc.

Highlights include concerts and recordings as a soloist with the English Chamber Orchestra, Belgrade Philharmonic Orchestra, Hartford Symphony Orchestra, St Petersburg Camerata, Antalya Symphony Orchestra, Orchestre de Picardie, Zurich Chamber Players, Ho Chi Minh Symphony Orchestra, Barcelona Symphony Orchestra, Real Filharmonía de Galicia, Palau de Les Arts Orchestra, Madrid Symphony Orchestra, Tenerife Symphony Orchestra and ADDA Sinfónica, among others. He has made recordings for radio and television in various European and American countries.

His discography includes five CDs with the companies Opera Tres, Fundación de Música Contemporánea and EMI Classics. He has been invited to give courses at conservatories and universities such as the Manhattan School of Music (New York), Mannes School of Music (New York), Bloomington School of Music (Indiana University, USA), University of Washington (Seattle, USA), Yale School of Music, The Boston Conservatory, North Carolina School of Music, California State University, Houston Fine Arts Centre, Guildhall School of Music (London), Sibelius Academy (Helsinki), The Royal Danish Academy of Music (Copenhagen), The Norwegian Academy of Music (Oslo), University of British Columbia (Vancouver), Conservatorio Nacional de México, Conservatorio de El Cairo, as well as other important Spanish and European music centres.

He holds a PhD from the University of Alicante. He won the Juan Andrés Prize for Essays and Research in the Humanities (2023) for his book on The origin and evolution of guitar technique, published by Verbum.

In November 2022, the Provincial Council of Alicante awarded him the Miguel Hernández Prize for his professional career.

== Orchestras ==
He has appeared as soloist with:

- English Chamber Orchestra
- Belgrade Philharmonic Orchestra
- Hartford Symphony Orchestra
- Orchestre de Picardie
- Camerata Hermitage of Saint Petersburg
- Zurich Chamber Players
- Ho Chi Minh Simphony Orchestra
- Orquesta Sinfónica Carlos Chávez
- Sinfonietta del Isste
- Orquesta Sinfónica de Antalya
- Orquesta Simfonica de Barcelona i Nacional de Catalunya
- Real Filharmonía de Galicia
- Orquesta Sinfónica de Madrid
- Orquesta Sinfónica de Tenerife
- Joven Orquesta Nacional de España
- Oviedo Filarmonía
- Orquesta Sinfónica de la Región de Murcia
- Orquesta de la Comunidad Valenciana
- ADDA Sinfónica de Alicante
- Orquesta de Cámara Ibérica
- Orquesta Ciudad de Elche
- Orquesta Sinfónica de Cuzco

== Educational activity ==
His highly significant teaching work has led him to give numerous courses at major music institutions and guitar festivals around the world. He is currently a professor at the Conservatorio Superior de Música de Alicante and academic director of the Máster en Interpretación de Guitarra Clásica at the Universidad de Alicante.

He has taught courses and masterclasses at institutions including:

- Manhattan School of Music (New York)
- Mannes School of Music (New York)
- Bloomington School of Music at Indiana University
- University of Washington (Seattle)
- Yale School of Music (Connecticut)
- The Boston Conservatory (Massachusetts)
- North Carolina School of Music
- California State University (Los Angeles)
- Lamont School of Music (Denver)
- University of British Columbia (Vancouver)
- Conservatorio Nacional de México
- Guildhall School of Music (London)
- The Royal Danish Academy of Music (Denmark)
- Sibelius Academy (Finland)
- Conservatorio di Musica di Salerno (Italy)
- Conservatorio Superior San Pietro di Napoli (Italy)
- Academy of Arts (Iceland)
- Conservatorio Superior de Murcia
- Conservatorio Superior de La Coruña
- Conservatorio Superior Santa Cruz de Tenerife
- Ikasmúsica (San Sebastián)
- Escola Luthier (Barcelona)
- Conservatorio de Damasco (Syria)
- Hacettepe Üniversitesi Ankara Devlet Konservatuvarı (Turkey)

== Awards ==
First Prize winner of five international competitions, including the prestigious Andrés Segovia, Francisco Tárrega and José Ramírez.

== Recordings ==
Discography includes five Cds published by Opera Tres, EMEC, Fundación de Música Contemporánea and EMI classics.
