= Miguel Ablóniz =

Italian-Greek Musician and composer

- Born: 29 May 1917; Cairo, Egypt
- Died: 19 July 2001 (aged 84); Acqui Terme, Italy
- Occupation: guitarist

Miguel Ablóniz, also known as Michelis Ablonitis (29 May 1917 – 19 July 2001) was a Greek-Italian guitarist and composer who composed and performed in diverse styles, including classical and Bossa Nova.

== Career ==
Ablóniz began playing the guitar at the age of eight in self-study. He began his musical career as a teenager when he appeared on the radio and gave concerts in Cairo. Later he studied music theory, piano, violin and guitar at the Barcelona Conservatory. He was taught by Emilio Pujol, Juan Díaz del Moral, and Pujol's wife Matilde Cuervas, from whom he learned to play flamenco. After he moved to Italy, he initially continued his career as a concertizing musician, but in 1953 he founded his own music school in Milan. He also taught the master class at the School of Music at Ithaca College in New York City for many years. He had great success as a teacher: his ideas on technique and performance aesthetics proved influential in the international guitar scene; he held renowned annual masterclasses in New York, and was the teacher of musicians such as Aldo Minella and Riccardo Zappa. He was also an influential musicologist, having written regularly for some of the main guitar magazines of the time, including La Chitarra, Arte Chitarristica, Guitar Review, and Guitar News.

In addition to a large number of transcriptions to guitar for existing works, Ablóniz composed many original pieces, as well as several didactic books. In total, he created more than 350 works and transcribed compositions by, for example, Manuel María Ponce. As a composer, he collaborated mainly with the publishing houses Casa Ricordi and Bèrben. Among his most famous works are Recuerdo Pompeano, Tanguillo, Tres Ritmos Sudamericanos, Recreational Pieces, and Pequeña Romanza.

== Select publications ==
- 2 Ricercari Moderni (Ricordi)
- 2 Sambas (Bèrben)
- 4 Preludi (Ricordi)
- An Incorrigibile Dreamer (Bossa Nova) (Bèrben)
- Back From Pernambuco (Bossa Nova) (Bèrben)
- Bailecito (Armonia)
- Brazilian Games (Bèrben)
- Brazilian Ragtime (Bèrben)
- Bulería Gitana (Ricordi)
- Capriccio Flamenco (on the theme "El Vito") (Bèrben)
- Capriccio N.3 (1954 – Armonia)
- Chôrinho (1959 – Ricordi)
- Chôro no.1 and 2 (Metron)
- Cowboy Melody (based on "Colorado Trail") (Ricordi)
- Due capricci (Bèrben)
- Giga (Ricordi)
- Guitar Chôro (Bèrben)
- Guitar Serenade (1959 – Ricordi),
- Improvvisazione (Omaggio a Villa-Lobos) (1955 – Ricordi)
- Malagueña (Capriccio) (Bèrben)
- Moods (Jazz in Bossa Nova) (Bèrben)
- Multiple Thinking (Bèrben)
- Partita in Mi (Ricordi)
- Polo (Ricordi)
- Prelude & Guitar Bossa (Bèrben)
- Quattro Bagatelle (Bèrben)
- Romantic Bossa (Bossa Nova) (Bèrben)
- Sequential (Bèrben)
- Tango Andaluz (Ricordi)
- Tanguillo (Bèrben)
- Tarantella Burlesca & Bossa Nova (Bèrben)
- Tres Gitanerías (1960 – Ricordi)
- Tres Ritmos Sudamericanos (Bèrben)
- Valsette e Marcetta (Ricordi)
- You And Me (Waltz & Samba) (Bèrben)

== Bibliography ==
- Giorgio Ferraris – "Miguel Ablóniz" from il Fronimo issue #116, October 2001.
- Simona Boni – Romolo Ferrari e la chitarra in Italia nella prima metà del Novecento, Mucchi Editore, 2009.
