= Conservatory of Lliria =

Music school in Spain

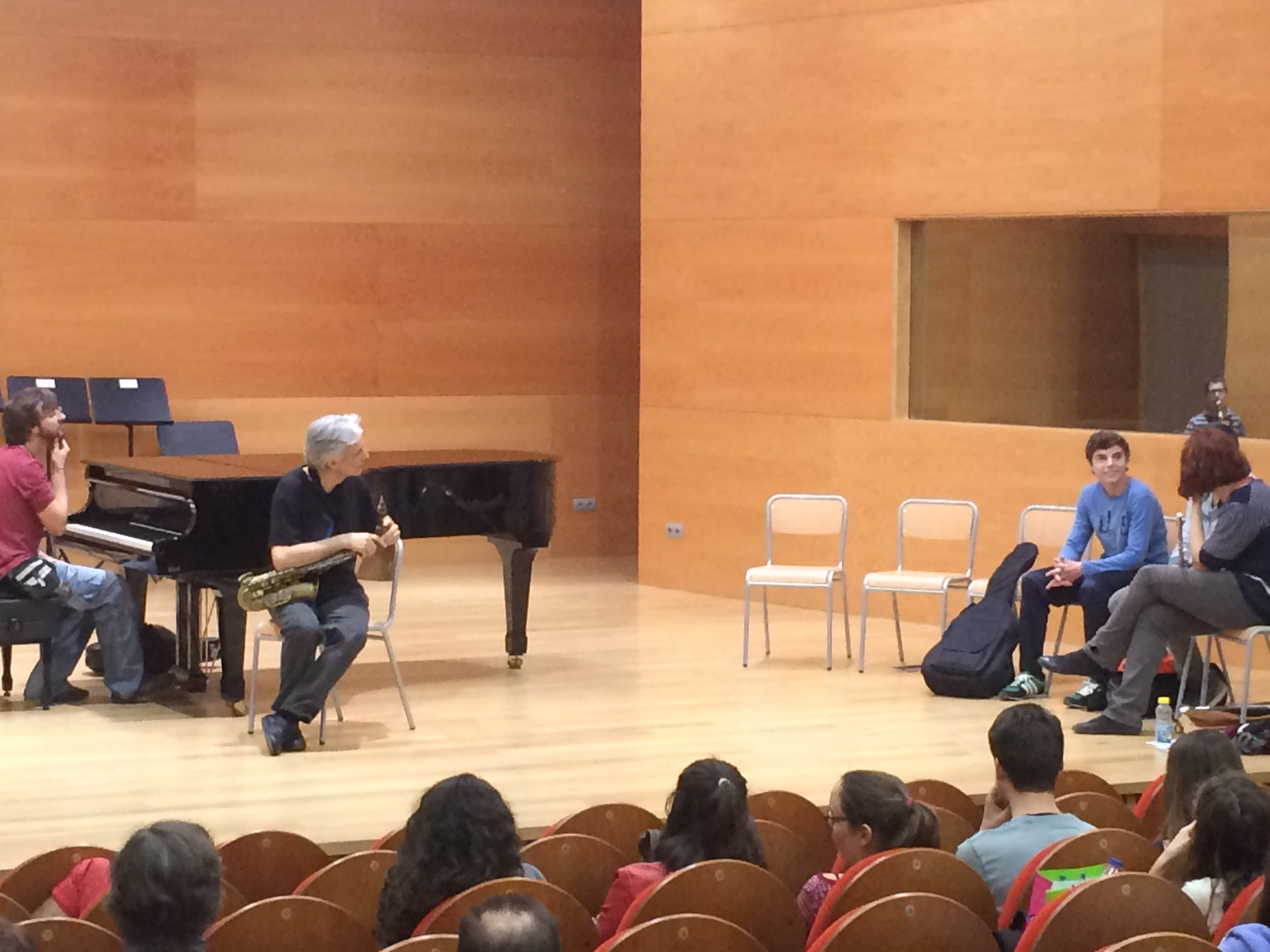

The Conservatory of music in Llíria (Valencia) is a public music school, depending administratively on the Conservatory number 2 in Valencia. The conservatory offers the following subjects: clarinet, bassoon, flute, hautbois, saxophone, French horn, trombone, trumpet, tuba, double bass, viola, violin, violoncello, percussion, piano and guitar. There are also music ensembles to complete the students educational program: orchestra, wind ensemble, big band and a choir.

== History ==
Lliria is called the city of music and is known for having a very old musical tradition. There are two wind orchestras, Banda Primitiva of Llíria and Unión Musical. In the 1990s, the city council decided to create a music school to provide proper musical education.
