= Llíria =

Llíria Liria
- Town and municipality
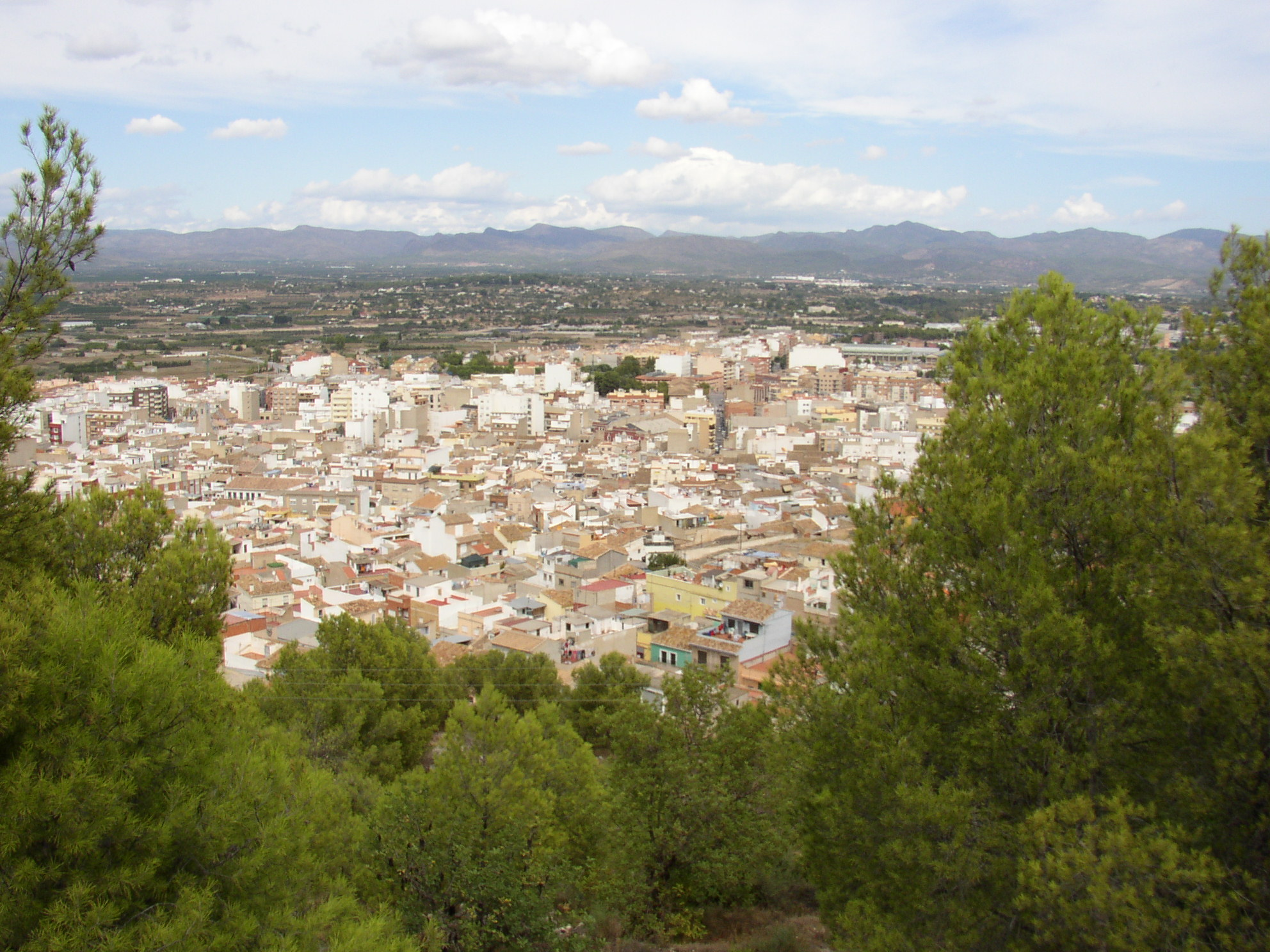

- Coat of arms

- Location within Province of Valencia Location within Valencian Community Location within Spain
- Coordinates: 39°37′33″N 0°35′39″W
- Country: Spain
- Autonomous community: Valencian Community
- Province: Valencia
- Comarca: Camp de Túria
- Judicial district: Liria

Government
  - Alcalde (Mayor): Joanma Miguel León(2021-) (Compromís)

Area
  - Total: 228 km^{2} (88 sq mi)
- Elevation: 164 m (538 ft)

Population (2025-01-01)
  - Total: 25,333
  - Density: 111/km^{2} (288/sq mi)
- Demonyms: • llirià, -ana (Val.) • liriano/a (Sp.)
- Official language(s): Valencian; Spanish
- Linguistic area: Valencian
- Time zone: UTC+01:00 (CET)
  - Summer (DST): UTC+02:00 (CEST)
- Postal code: 46160
- Website: Official website

Llíria, (Note: Pronunciation of Llíria: Valencian: [ˈʎiɾia]) in Valencian (known in Spanish as Liria), (Note: Pronunciation of Liria (unofficial): Spanish: [ˈliɾja]) is a medium-sized town off the CV35 motorway to the north of Valencia, Spain. Known as Edeta in ancient Iberian times, it is the musical capital of the region. On October 30, 2019, Llíria was declared a Creative City in the category of Music by UNESCO.

== Location ==
Llíria is the capital of the area known as Camp de Túria in the province of Valencia. It is approximately 25 km (16 mi) north-west of the city of Valencia. It sits at an altitude of 164m (530'). The traditional economy is based on agriculture, but industries such as textiles, construction materials, plastics, and furniture are becoming increasingly important. The city is at the end of the Metrovalencia train system. Construction of a new general hospital in Llíria began in 2007 and finished in 2015. Due to the severe financial crisis, the building of the hospital took much longer than initially expected.

The local Festes are Pilgrimage of Saint Vincent (29 April), and Saint Michael (29 September).

== History and architecture ==
=== Pre-Roman Age ===
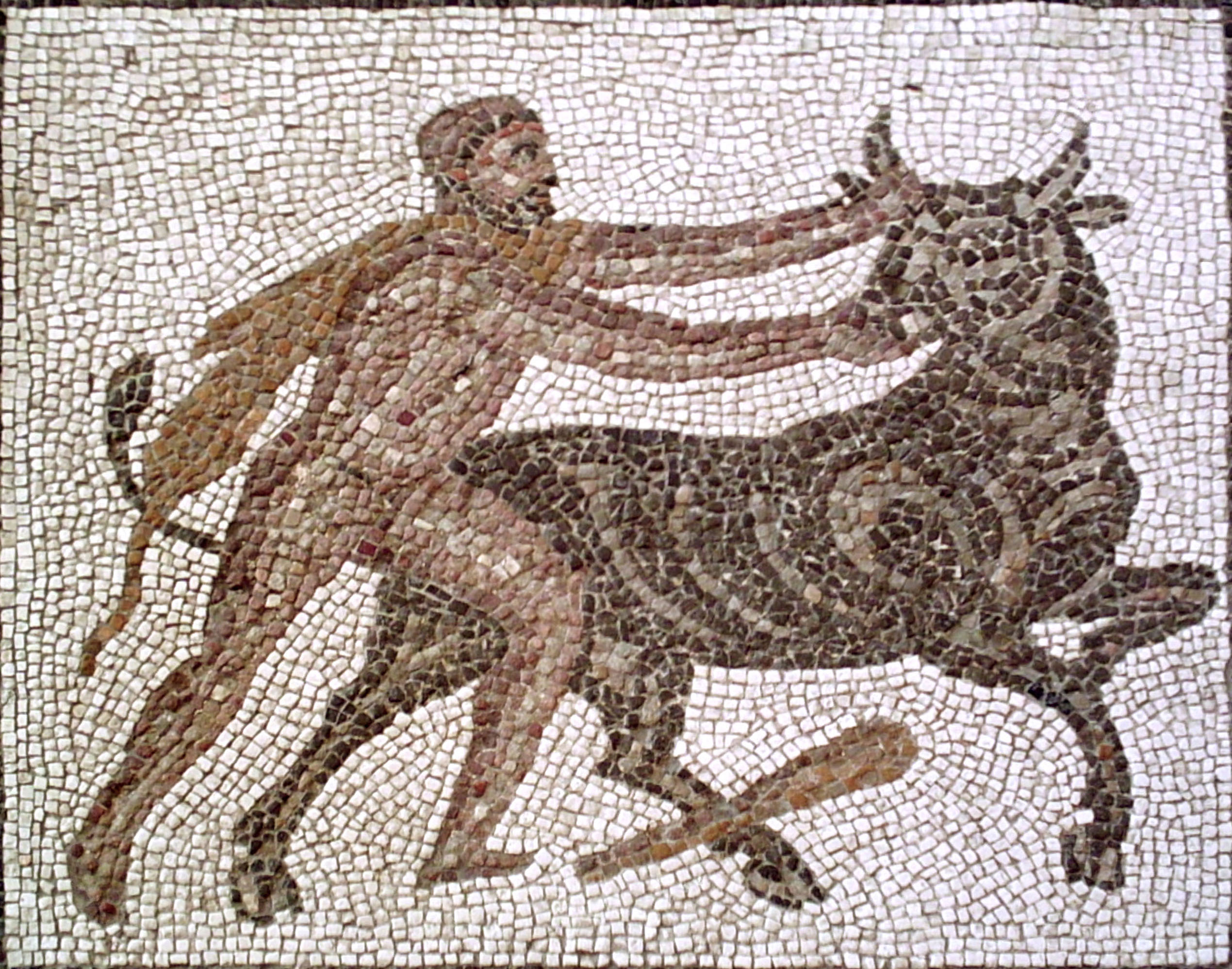
Detail of The Twelve Labours mosaic (3rd century).

Under Llíria lie the ruins of what was one of the most important Iberian cities in Spain. The city was then known as Edeta and it was the administrative centre of Edetania, an extensive territory between the rivers Júcar / Xúquer and Palancia River / Riu Palància.

Edeta was built on a hilltop known as Sant Miquel, which overlooks the modern city. The city was moved downhill to its current location by Quintus Sertorius after Roman troops destroyed the town in 76 BC.

=== Roman Age ===
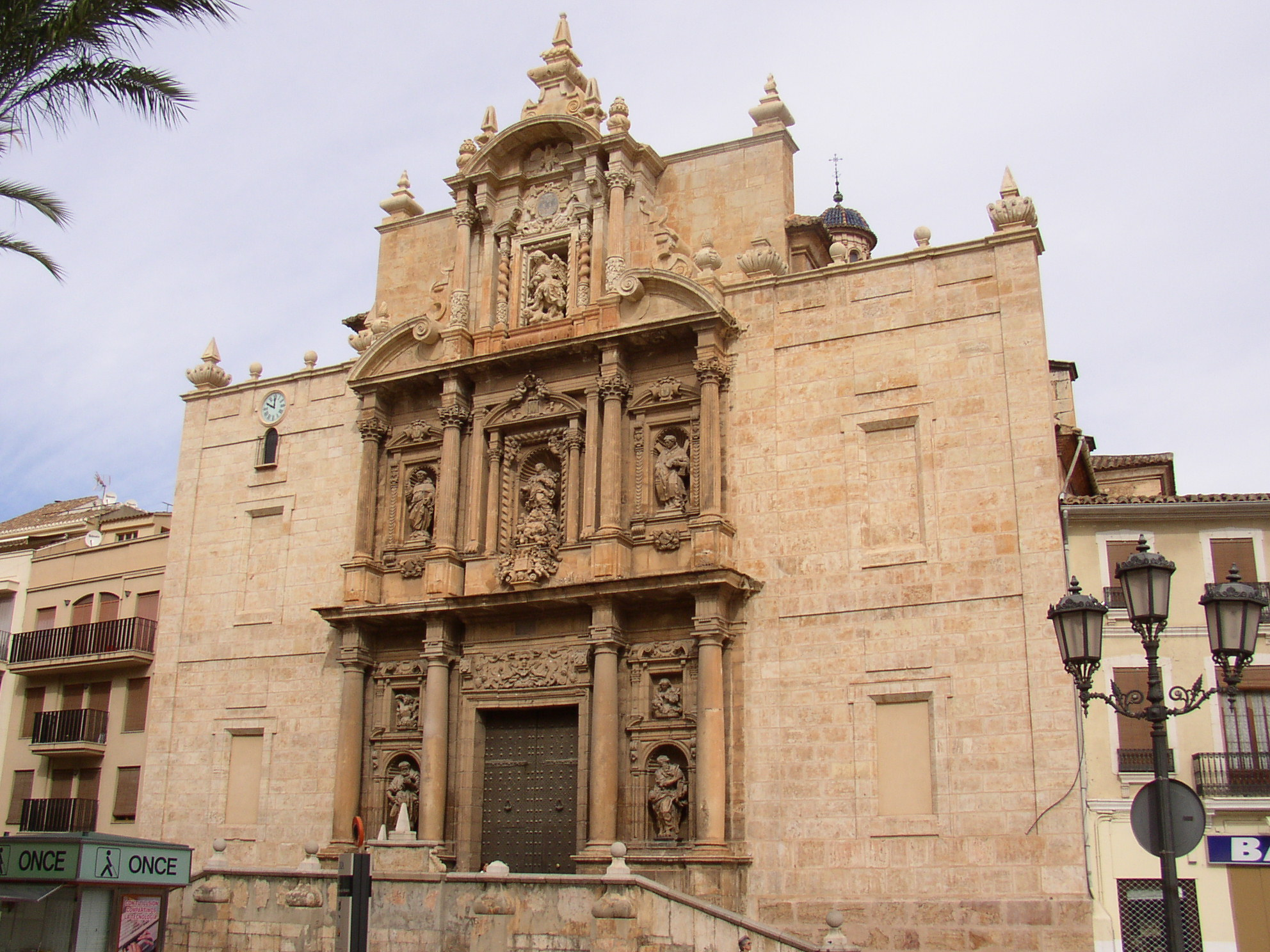
L'Assumpció / La Asunción Baroque church (17th century).

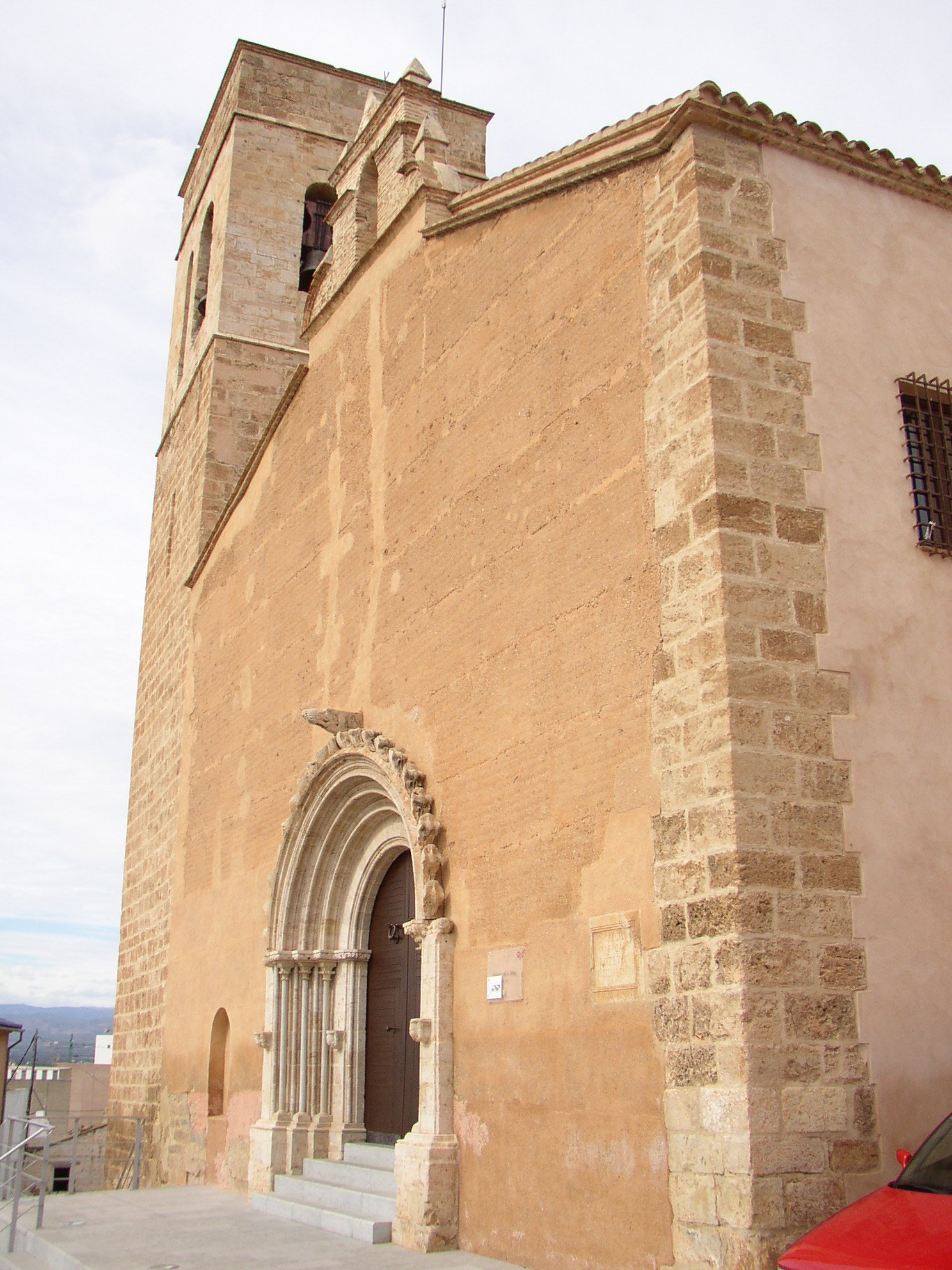
Església de la Sang.

Under the Romans, Llíria was as important as Valencia or Sagunt. The town is very rich in Roman finds, including a large Roman leisure centre with a temple, shops, pools, and hot baths.

Recent archaeological excavations have uncovered one of Spain's largest-ever caches of buried coins. Popularly known as the Treasure of Carrer Duc de Llíria, it totals some 6,000 silver denarii minted in the first and third centuries. Another archaeological find was a mosaic of The Twelve Labours of Hercules, which was excavated from a Domus Romana (Roman home) at Can Porcar or Casa de Porcar (Porcar House) in Llíria. It is currently displayed at the National Archaeological Museum of Spain (in Madrid). Additionally, Llíria's own archaeological museum contains imagery from its original location including details of each of the labors along with other Roman artifacts from the town.

=== Medieval Period ===
The first church in Llíria was built in 1238 by King James I of Aragon, after his victory over the Moors and the conquest of the Valencian region. The Church of the Blood (església de la Sang) was built on the site of a mosque and is a typical example of Valencian Gothic architecture with Roman and Valencian influences. Some remains of the original mosque can still be seen.

In 1919 the church was gazetted as a National Monument and was the first religious monument in the Valencian Community to receive this distinction. The church was recently restored and opened to the public.

== Climate ==
The climate is Mediterranean, but with slight continental influence due to the inland location with occasional cool nights in winter, snow is a very rare phenomenon. The average temperature is between 10°/11° C (50°/52° F) in January and 26°/29 °C (79°/84 °F) in July and August. Rainfall is very irregular but with heavy showers common in September and October.

== Population ==
The city has about 24,000 residents (2022). Llíria and the surrounding area has one of fastest rates of population growth in the entire nation. Utility services are struggling to keep up with largely unplanned growth. The largest immigrant communities are from Morocco (434), Romania (344) and the United Kingdom (323).

== Festivals ==
- Holy Week in Llíria: (Valencian: Setmana Santa de Llíria, Spanish: Semana Santa de Liria) is one of the most important traditional events in the city and also one of the most ancient traditional Holy Week celebrations in the Region of Valencia. It is celebrated between Friday of Sorrows and Resurrection Sunday, including also Palm Sunday, Maundy Thursday (Holy Thursday), Good Friday, and Holy Saturday. Llíria has elaborate processions during Holy Week, a tradition that dates from medieval times. Like in other regions of Spain, its Holy Week is notable for featuring the procession of "imágenes", lifelike wood or plaster sculptures of individual scenes of the events that happened between Jesus' arrest and his burial, or images of the Virgin Mary showing grief for the torture and killing of her son.
- Saint Michael's Festival or Feast Day: on 29 September
- Saint Vincent's Festival or Feast Day: Next Monday after Easter
- Festival of the Immaculate Conception: end of August
- Festival of Our Lady of the Remedy: mid-September
- Taurine Week: First week of October

== Music ==
Several thousand of Llíria's residents play musical instruments and the city is well known for its two intensely rival bands (wind orchestras). The first band, the "Banda Primitiva", was formed by a Franciscan friar Antoni Albarracín Enguídanos in 1819 and the subsequent band divided in 1903 to form the rival Unió Musical.

The Conservatory of Lliria is a public center created by the city council in the 1990s.

== Language ==
Both Spanish and Valencian are spoken in the town; however, the number speaking Valencian in their homes is steadily decreasing as the town is slowly absorbed into the Spanish-speaking conurbation of Valencia.

== Schools ==
- Spanish-language grant-aided schools: El Prat (962 780 071)
- Valencian-language grant-aided schools: La Unió (962 780 254)
- Spanish language church schools: Francisco Llopis (962 781 091) and Santa Ana (962 781 091)

Spanish & Valencian language schools (State): Sant Vicent (962 780 374), Sant Miquel (962 781 217), Camp de Túria (962 780 503), and Laurona (962 790 125).

== See also ==
- List of municipalities in Valencia
