= Emilio Pujol =

Spanish composer (1886–1980)

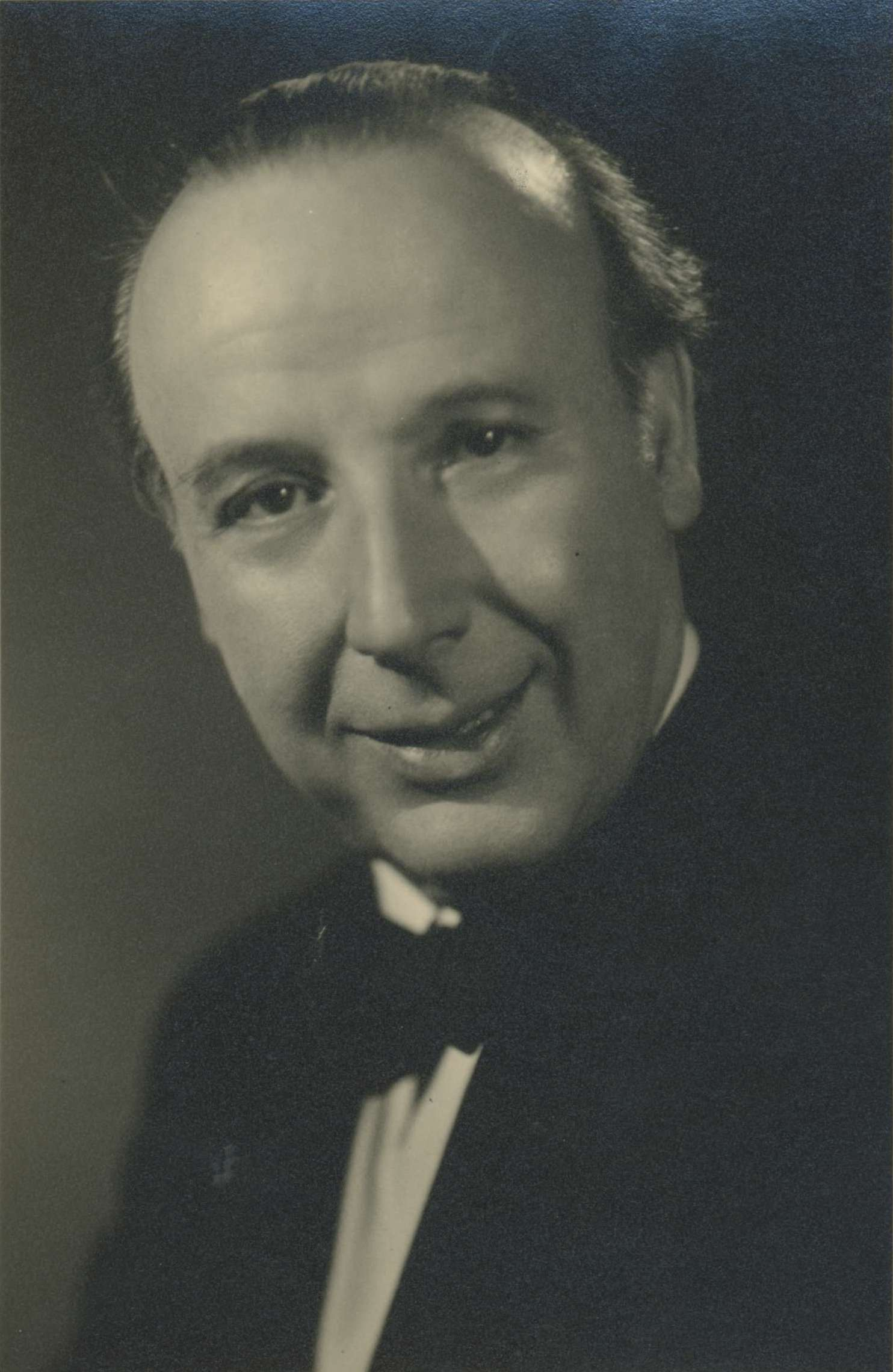
Emilio Pujol

Emilio Pujol Vilarrubí (or Emili; 7 April 1886 – 15 November 1980) was a Spanish composer, guitarist and a leading teacher of the classical guitar.

== Biography ==
Emili Pujol was born in the little village of Granadella just outside Lleida, Spain. He began his studies with Francisco Tárrega in 1902, when he was sixteen years of age. At this time, Miguel Llobet was making his debut as a concert artist outside Barcelona. Pujol fondly remembered his first encounter with Tárrega and in his biography of his teacher, he described his mestre in very endearing, romantic terms.

During the war years 1914–1918 he did not travel much and mainly remained in Catalonia. In 1918 he undertook his first tour of South America, starting in Buenos Aires. The only major interruptions in his concert travels were his marriage to Matilde Cuervas in Paris, an Andalusian flamenco guitarist, and the period of time he devoted to historical research in Paris into the instrumental predecessors of the guitar. During this period he partnered with the publisher Max Eschig in publishing his "Bibliothèque de musique ancienne et moderne pour guitare" (from 1927), resulting in numerous works for solo guitar by historical and contemporary composers. The beginning signs of World War II also prevented him from continuing his concert career.

From 1935 through 1940, Pujol continued giving a few concerts and lectures as well as pursuing his research in Spain, London and Paris. By 1941 he was back in Spain to the end of his life, and he started preparing the volume covering the composer for vihuela, Luis de Narváez, for the series Monumentos de la Música Española (vol. III). The volume was eventually followed by volumes covering Alonso Mudarra (1949) and Valderrábano (1963). Prior to his death, Pujol had begun work on the largest of vihuela music books, the Orphenica Lyra by Miguel Fuenllana, published in 1554. He considered this book to be the pinnacle of the vihuela school and regarded Fuenllana as the final spokesman for this brief, courtly instrumental period in Spanish music.

In 1946, Pujol began his guitar classes at the Lisbon Conservatory of Music, which continued through to 1969. During this period he was involved in giving master classes (in 1953 he was personally invited by Andrés Segovia to give classes at the Accademia Musicale Chigiana) and adjudicating at guitar competitions. Notable students included Héctor García, Maria Luisa Anido and Miguel Ablóniz. Also at this time, Pujol's first wife Matilde Cuervas died (1956). Seven years later he married Maria Adelaide Robert, a noted Portuguese pianist and singer who greatly assisted him in his final years.

Beginning in the summer of 1965, Pujol launched his International Courses of Guitar, Lute and Vihuela in the city of Lleida, Spain. This event became quite popular and was attended by students and teachers from throughout the world. It was repeated every summer over a ten-year period, and in 1969 it was moved to the thirteenth-century village of Cervera.

His words on Tárrega's School of Guitar are also applicable to his own spirit, which constantly strived to "resolving in advance all the problems, which can arise out of the diverse elements which contribute to the performance of a work: instrument, hands and spirit."

== Prominent students ==
- Alberto Ponce
- Pieter van der Staak
- Hopkinson Smith
- Giuliano Balestra
- Carles Trepat
- Armando Marrosu
- Hector Garcia
- Ned Sublette
- Manuel Cubedo (guitarist)

== Original compositions ==
124 original compositions (Joan Riera)

=== ?? ===
Escuela Razonada de la Guitarra Vol I-IV

- El Abejorro
- Ondinas
- Canción de Cuna
- Barcarolle
- Cubana
- Impromptu
- Piezas Españolas
- Pieza nº 2 (Guajira o Evocación Cubana)
- Pieza nº 3 (Tango Español)
- Preludios
- Scottish Madrileño
- Sevilla
- Danzas Españolas
- Tango
- Tonadilla
- Guajira
- La Libelula
- Etude Romantico
- Variations on a theme by Aguado
- Etude Romantico
- Festivola

=== Solo guitar ===
(ME numbers refer to the catalogue number of his publisher, Max Eschig, Paris)

- ME 7899 Aquelarre (Danse des sorcières - 1969) Pujol n°1246
- ME 7028 Atardecer (Crépuscule) Pujol n°1229
- ME 7238 Barcarolle Pujol n°1235
- ME 7580 Becqueriana (Endecha) Pujol n°1240
- ME 3130 Cancion de Cuna (Berceuse) Pujol n°1203
- ME 7884 Canto de Otono (Chant d’automne) Pujol n°1245
- ME 7939 Cap i Cua (Variation désuète sur l’exercice 19 d’Aguado) Pujol n°1248
- ME 7848 Caprice varié sur un thème d’Aguado Pujol n°1242
- ME 7541 Endecha a la Amada Ausente Pujol n°1238
- ME 2186 Étude n°1 Pujol n°1200
- ME 2187 Étude n°2 Pujol n°1201
- ME 2188 Étude n°3 Pujol n°1202
- ME 3128 Exercices en formes d’études, 1. Cahier Pujol n°1221
- ME 7847 2. Cahier Pujol n°1243
- ME 2189 Impromptu Pujol n°1206
- ME 7579 La Libelula Pujol n°1239
- ME 2586-88 Trois Morceaux espagnols: 1. Tonadilla; 2. Tango; 3. Guajira Pujol n°1204
- ME 3129 Pequena Romanza Pujol n°1222
- ME 7885 Pizzicato Pujol n°1247
- ME 7236 Deux Préludes Pujol n°1233
- ME 7027 Rapsodie Valenciana Pujol n°1228
- ME 2190 Sevilla (Evocation) Pujol n°1205
- ME 7030 Triquilandia (Jugando al Escondite) Pujol n°1231
- ME 7237 2e Triquilandia: 1. Œdipe et le Sphinx; 2. Variation; 3. Jeu; 4. La Plume de perdreau; 5. Branle bourguignon Pujol n°1234
- ME 7533 3e Triquilandia: 1. Le Petit Grenadier; 2. Cantilène; 3. Valse Pujol n°1241,
- ME 7991 Triptyque campagnard (1971): 1. Aube; 2. Bucolique; 3. Fête Pujol n°1249
- ME 7883 Variations sur un thème obsédant Pujol n°1244
- ME 7029 Veneciana Pujol n°1230

=== Guitar duos ===
- ME 8046 Canaries (Canarios), air de danse populaire ancienne Pujol n°1415
- ME 8081-01 Duet (étude) Pujol n°1417a
- ME 6942 Manola del Avapies (Tonadilla) Pujol n°1403
- ME 7239 Ricercare Pujol n°1409
- ME 8081 Tyrolienne (Tirolesa) Pujol n°1417b

== Transcriptions ==
275 transcriptions (Juan Riera)

=== Guitar duo ===
Francis Poulenc (1899–1963). Waltzes, arr from the piano Paris : Editions M. Eschig, c1970.

== Discography ==
=== Recordings by Emilio Pujol ===
- Musique instrumentale espagnole au 16e siècle; Paris, France [ca 1936]
- Romances et villancicos espagnols du 16e siècle; Anthologie Sonore, Disque No.17, Paris, France [1935]
- Spanish Songs - Historical Live Recording Of The 1954 Madrid Recital (Rosa Barbany, soprano; Emilio Pujol vihuela) (EMEC Discos; E-050)

=== Compositions by Emilio Pujol ===
- Emilio Pujol : Intégrale, 3CD (complete recording of Pujol compositions by students of Alberto Ponce), France, 1999.
- Emilio Pujol. Works for guitar, by Claudio Marcotulli, 1 CD Dynamic, Italy, 2002 [Program notes and biographical notes in Italian, English, and French and German (19p., portrs). Contents: Seguidilla—Canción amatoria—Tango—Studio in si minore—Barcarolle—Romanza—Preludio romantico—Guajira—Homenaje a Tárrega—Ondinas—Canción de cuna—Manola del Avapies (tonadilla) -- El cant dels Ocels—Paisaje—Cubana—Studio romantico—Festivola—Scottish madrilène—Salve]
- Emili Pujol. Obres per a guitarra / Guitar Works, by Josep Antoni Chic, 1 CD Là mas de guido, Spain, 2003.
- Maria Ribera Gibal interpreta Emili Puijol, 1 CD Audiovisuals de Sarrià, Barcelona, Spain, 2018.
- Emilio Pujol. Estudios, by Frank Bungarten, 1 CD MDG, Germany, 2019
- Emilio Pujol Guitar Duets, by Duo Imbesi Zangarà (players : Carmelo Imbesi and Carmen Zangarà), 1 CD Classical Music 3.0, 2023

== Bibliography ==
=== Musicologic works by Emilio Pujol ===
- Emilio Pujol: El Dilema Del Sonido en la Guitarra. 4 editions:
  - Hamburg: Trekel, c1975. 1975 German 28, iv, [i] p. ///Das Dilemma des Klanges bei der Gitarre / Emilio Pujol; hrsg. u. mit e. Vorw. vers. von Wolf Moser; [Dt. von Wolf Moser], Hamburg: Trekel, c1975. Edition Date:1975 Language:GermanNotes:Translation of Dilema del sonido en la guitarra. Cover title. Physical Details:28, iv, [i] p.; 21 cm. Other Authors:Moser, Wolf.
  - Buenos Aires: Ricordi Americana [1960] 1960 Spanish 84 p
  - Buenos Aires: Ricordi Americana, c1960. 1960 Spanish Ed. corr. y amp., con texto inglés y francés. 84 p.
  - Buenos Aires: Ricerdi Americana [1960] 1960 Spanish Edición corregida y ampliada. con texto inglés y francés. 84 p (?? 1960/1966. OCLC: 1061872 / 1960 OCLC: 58964343)
    - El Dilema Del Sonido en la Guitarra (PDF).
- Emilio Pujol: "La Guitare", in: Encyclopédie de la Musique et Dictionnaire du Conservatoire, second part, vol. III, Delagrave. Paris, 1926, pp. 2011–12.
- Emilio Pujol: La Guitarra y su historia; conferencia, Buenos Aires: Casa Romero y Fernandez (1932), OCLC: 48131009
- Emilio Pujol: Tárrega. Ensayo biográfico, Lison: Los Talleres Gráficos de Ramos, Afonso & Moita, Lda., 1960. 2nd edition: S.l., s.n. (Valencia: Artes Gráficas Soler, 1978), Notes:"Obras de Tárrega para guitarra": p. 259-[267] Includes indexes,ISBN 84-300-0090-9, OCLC 5287791.

=== Early music editions ===
- Emilio Pujol - Tres Libros de música en cifra para vihuela (Sevilla, 1546) / Alonso Mudarra; transcripción y estudio por Emilio Pujol. Barcelona: Consejo Superior de Investigaciones Científicas, 1984 (Reprint of 1949 edition), ISBN 84-00-05680-9, OCLC 39171049.
- Emilio Pujol - Los Seys libros del Delphin, de música de cifra para tañer vihuela by Luis de Siglo XVI Nerváez; Barcelona: Consejo Superior de Investigaciones Científicas, 1945; OCLC 48310460.
- Emilio Pujol - Libro de música de vihuela, institulado Silva de sirenas (Valladolid, 1547); Barcelona: C.S.I.C. Instituto español de musicología, 1965; OCLC 67466655.

=== Poems ===
- Emilio Pujol: Poemes; Lleida: Cátedra de Cultura Catalana Samuel Gili i Gaya, Institut d'Estudis Ilerdencs de l'Excma. Diputació Provincial, 1976; ISBN 84-00-03504-6, OCLC 4229333.

=== Guitar School by Emilio Pujol ===
A guitar method based on the principles of Francisco Tarrega consisting of four historical and technical volumes:

- Emilio Pujol: Escuela razonada de la guitarra: basada en los principos de la técnica de Tárrega; Buenos Aires: Ricordi Americana, 1954; OCLC 55156339.

=== Publications about Emilio Pujol ===
- Renata Borgatti: Due aspetti del romanticismo: Schumann e Chopin; Apporto italiano alla chitarra classica [di] Emilio Pujol; Siena: Ticci, 1953; OCLC: 1913194.
- Curtis Nunley: Emilio Pujol: The Guitar Pedagogue in Escuela Razonada de la Guitarra, book one and the right hand technique written in El dilemma del sonido en la guitarra (1993); OCLC 31333907.
- Daniela Polcher: La Méthode de guitare d'Emilio Pujol (The Emilio Pujol guitar method), bachelor thesis, Paris: Institut de Formation des Enseignants de la Musique, 1999.
- Juan Riera: Emilio Pujol Lérida: Instituto de Estudios Ilerdenses de la Excma, 1974; ISBN 84-00-04029-5, OCLC 2467063.
