= Banda Primitiva of Llíria =

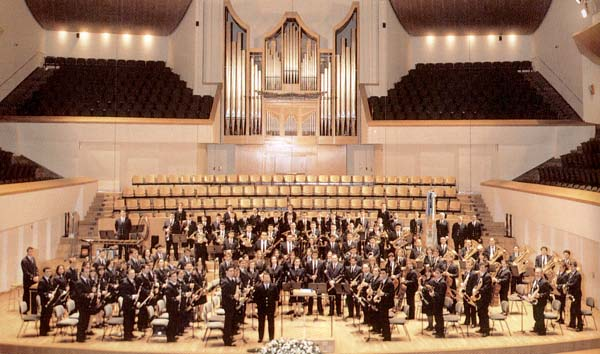
La Banda Primitiva de Llíria

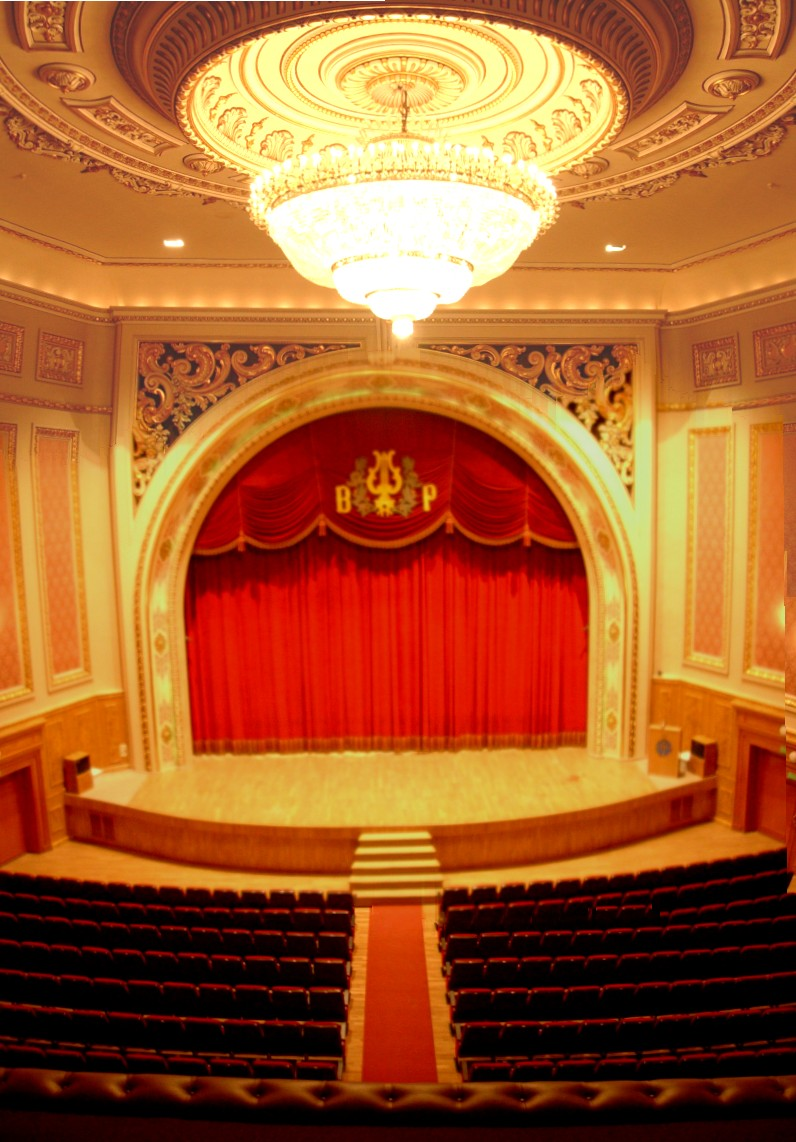
Theatre

La Banda Primitiva of Llíria (Valencia, Spain) was founded in 1819 by the Franciscan father Antoni Albarracín Enguídanos. It is the oldest civil band in Spain.

In 1888, the band participated for the first time in the Certamen de Bandas in Valencia and obtained the first prize. La Banda Primitiva has been awarded the first prize many times since then.

The band has performed in concerts, civil and religious parades, as well as on television and radio programs, and has showcased its music across major Spanish cities and various countries, including Germany, Belgium, France, the Netherlands, and Switzerland, as well as in the United States (New York and Los Angeles) and China (Beijing and Shanghai).

La Banda Primitiva de Llíria has been conducted by the most famous Valencian conductors and by some very prestigious European conductors, including Sergiu Celibidache, Desirée Dondaine, Odón Alonso, Rafael Früebeck de Burgos, Jan Molenar, Luis Cobos, Manuel Galduf and Jan Cober.

== Prizes ==
First prize in the Exposición Universal de Barcelona in 1929. The official opening of the current Theatre-Concert Hall on 23 September 1951. First prize with Honours in the International Musical Competition in Kerkrade, The Netherlands, in 1962. First prize with Honours, Flag of the Council and Gold Trumpet from the Ministry of Foreign Affairs of Czechoslovakia in the International Musical Competition in Kerkrade, The Netherlands, in 1966. Guest band in the New York Parade of the Columbus Day in 1981. First prize with Honours in the Certamen Internacional de Valencia in 1986 (first centenary of the Certamen). First prize with Honours in the Certamen Internacional de Valencia in 1988 (centenary of the first prize the band obtained in this Certamen) Reopening of the Theatre-Concert Hall on 22 June 1991, after its restoration. Guest band representing Spain in the Parade of the Tournament of Roses, Pasadena (Los Angeles), in 1992, celebrating the 5th Centenary of the Discovery of America. First Spanish band touring in China in 2002, playing concerts in Beijing and Shanghai.
