= Granada (disambiguation) =

Granada is a city in Spain.

Granada may also refer to:

== Arts and entertainment ==
- "Granada" (song), a 1932 Mexican song about the Spanish city
- "Granada" (Albéniz), an 1886 piano composition by Isaac Albéniz
- Granada (board game), a 2009 finance-themed Eurogame by Dirk Henn
- Granada (video game), a video game for the X68000 and Mega Drive/Genesis
- Camp Granada, a 1965 children's board game based on "Hello Muddah, Hello Fadduh"

== Businesses ==
- Granada plc, a former British media and catering conglomerate:
  - ITV Granada, formerly Granada Television, a British commercial television station, based in Manchester
  - Granada Productions, the production arm of Granada Television merged with Carlton International to form ITV Studios in 2009
- Moto Hospitality, a chain of British service stations previously called Granada

== Places ==
=== Colombia ===
- New Kingdom of Granada, a Spanish colony with similar borders to modern Colombia
- Granada, Antioquia, a town
- Granada, Cundinamarca, a town
- Granada, Meta, a town

=== Kuwait ===
- Granada (Kuwait), a residential area in Kuwait

=== Nicaragua ===
- Granada, Nicaragua, a colonial city
  - Granada Department, a subdivision of Nicaragua, similar to a province

=== Peru ===
- Granada District, a district in the province of Chachapoyas
  - Granada, Peru, the capital city of the Granada District

=== Spain ===
- Granada (province), a province of Spain
  - Granada (Congress of Deputies constituency)
  - Granada (Senate constituency)
  - Granada (Parliament of Andalusia constituency)
  - Granada (wine), a Spanish wine region
- Emirate of Granada, a former Moorish kingdom in Spain, and the last Moorish kingdom on the Iberian Peninsula to fall to the Christian kingdoms in 1492
- Kingdom of Granada (Crown of Castile), a former territory of the Crown of Castile

=== United States ===
- Granada, Colorado
  - Granada War Relocation Center in Colorado during World War II
- Granada Hills, Los Angeles, California
- Granada, Minnesota
- Granada, Missouri
- Granada Middle School in Whittier, California

== Education ==
- Granada High School (disambiguation)
- Granada Hills Charter High School in California

== Other uses ==
- Ford Granada (Europe) and Ford Granada (North America), automobiles produced by the Ford Motor Company
- 1159 Granada, an asteroid
- Granada CF, a Spanish football club

== See also ==
- 1066 Granada massacre, a pogrom against the Jews
- El Granadas, a British rope spinning variety act
- Granadilla (disambiguation)
- Grenada (disambiguation)
- Grenade (disambiguation)
- Kingdom of Granada (disambiguation)
- Emirate of Granada
- New Granada (disambiguation)
- Granada Cinema (disambiguation), several cinemas
- Granada Theater (disambiguation), or theatre, several buildings
