= Classical guitar making =

A person who is specialized in the making of stringed instruments such as guitars, lutes and violins is called a luthier.

== Skills ==
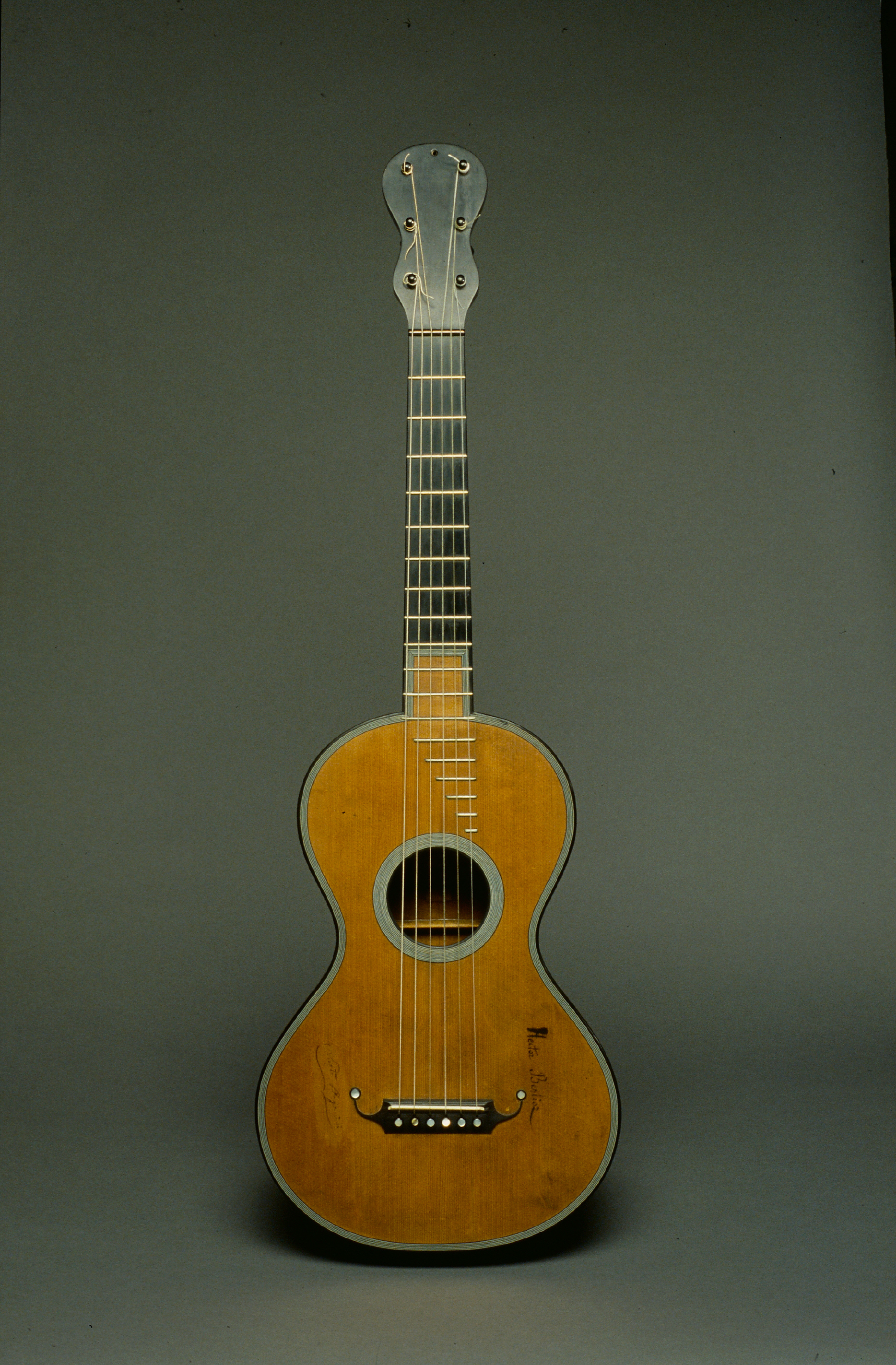
Early romantic guitar (Paris around 1830) by Jean-Nicolas Grobert (1794–1869). *String scale-length: 635 mm. Instrument top shows signatures of Paganini and Berlioz. The guitar was loaned to Paganini by Jean-Baptiste Vuillaume in 1838 and later given by Vuillaume to Berlioz, who later donated it to the Musée du Conservatoire de musique in 1866. Today the guitar is displayed at the Museum Cité de la Musique in Paris (Inventory Number E.375). Zoom image

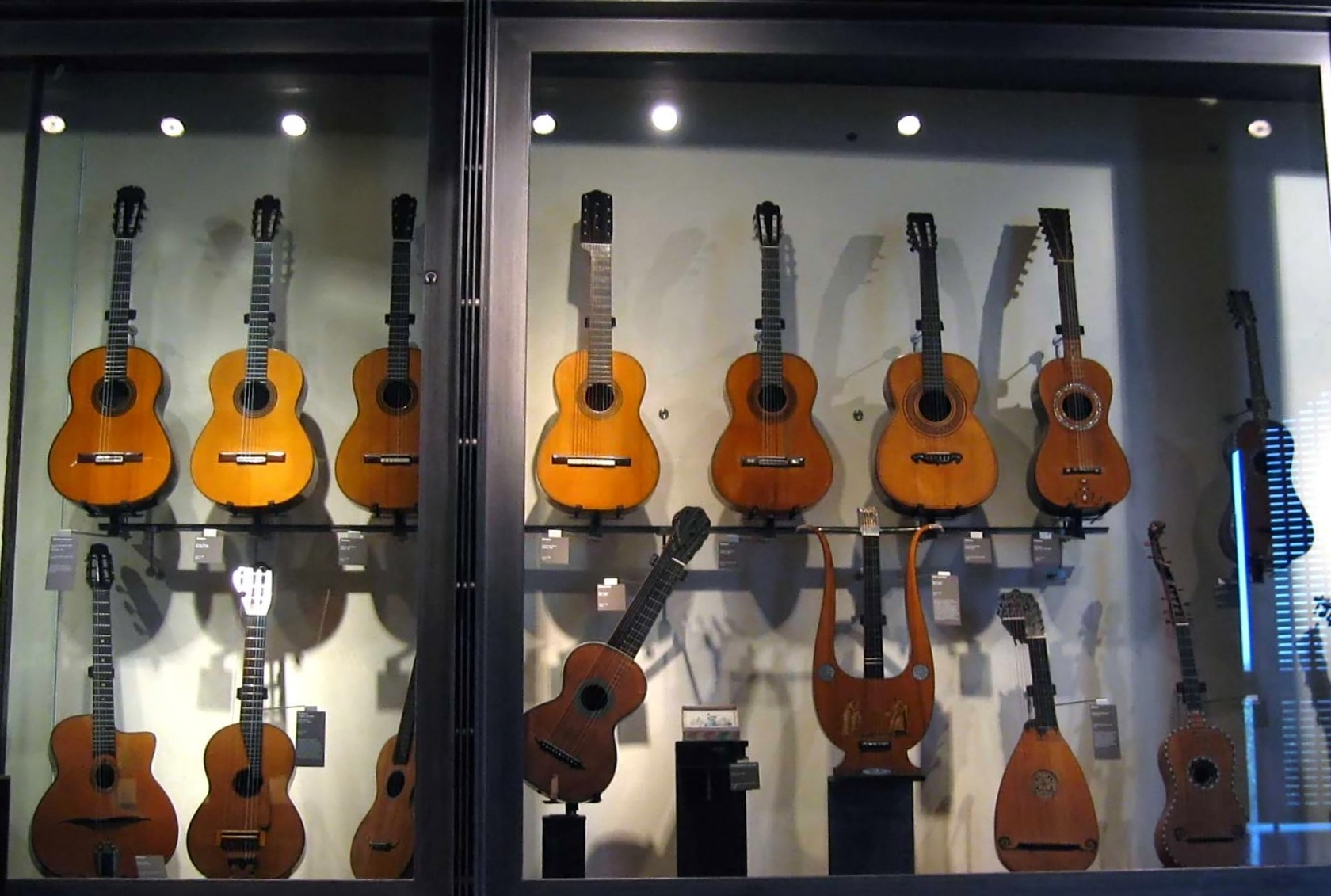
Guitars from the Museum Cité de la Musique in Paris (which houses almost 200 classical guitars)

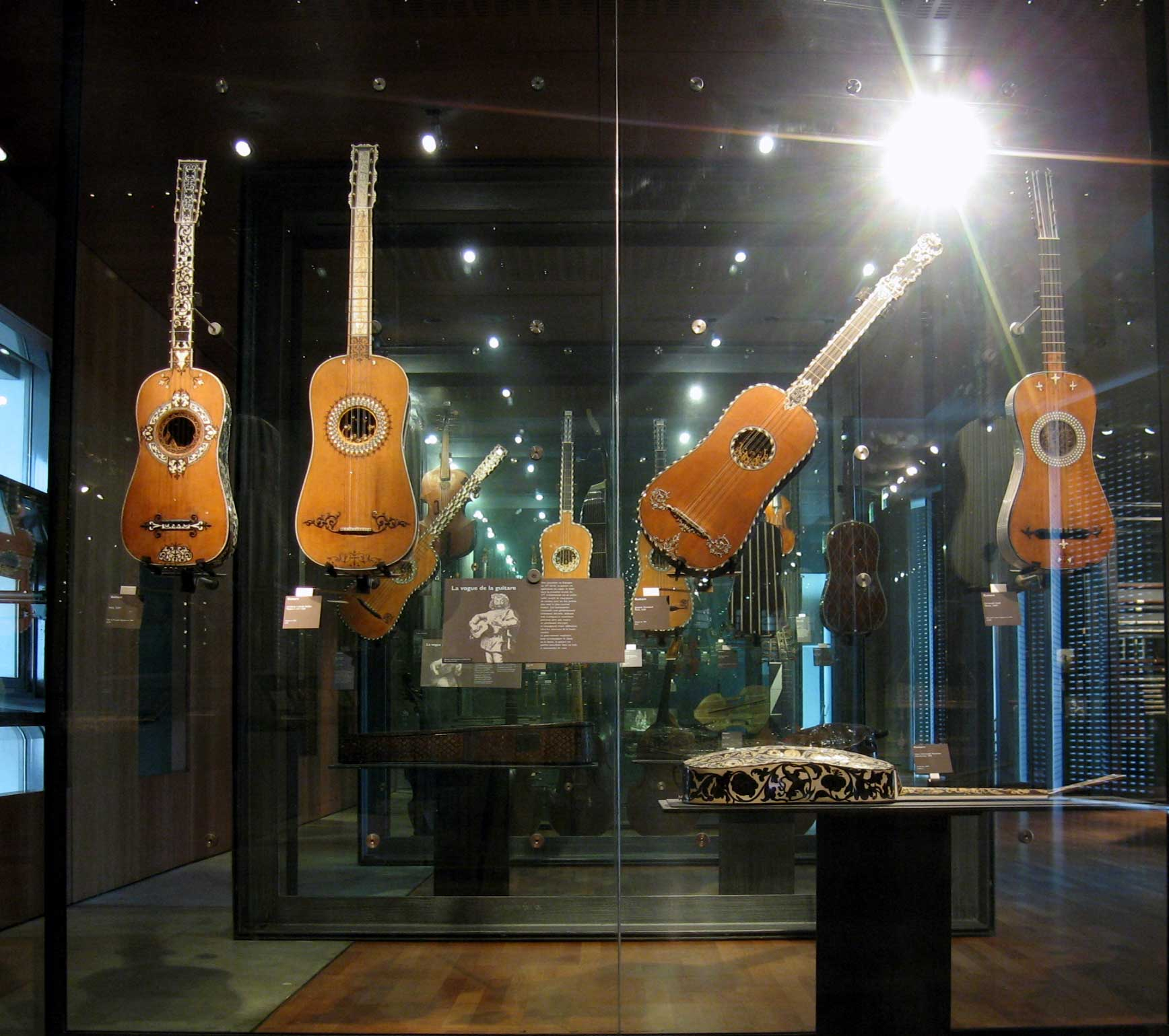
Baroque Guitars from the Museum Cité de la Musique in Paris (which houses almost 200 classical guitars)

In general one can distinguish three main aspects of guitar making:

1. "Sound" feature that includes shaping the wood (vibrational aspects: densities, stiffness), wood-selection, shaping the bracing; to design; etc. The goal aim is a sound quality that helps the musician create music. Guitars by different builders often reflect different sound preferences—e.g., when comparing instruments of Lacôte or Grobert, with Torres, etc. All can have high sound quality, yet multiple guitarists feel one may be more appropriate for particular repertoire choices, e.g., Lacôte or Grobert for "classical era repertoire" or "central European romantic repertoire"; versus Torres for "Spanish or late-romantic nationalist repertoire", etc.).
2. "Playability" aspects
  This includes the shaping of the frets, string-spacing, neck-width, neck, nut and bridge height (influence on action); decisions about scale-length; etc.
  The aim is a guitar that is easy and comfortable to play, does not have string-buzz, and suits the requirements/desires of a particular player.
3. "Visual/decorative" aspects
  This includes the visual features of the guitar, including rosette design, inlays, ornamentation, etc. (In general these creative visual aspects should not interfere or diminish the sound features, or hinder the playability of the guitar).

Fernando Sor has written that an instrument-maker "should be an accurate draughtsman, understand the common principles of mechanics, the composition and resolution of forces, and the laws of vibrating strings and surfaces".

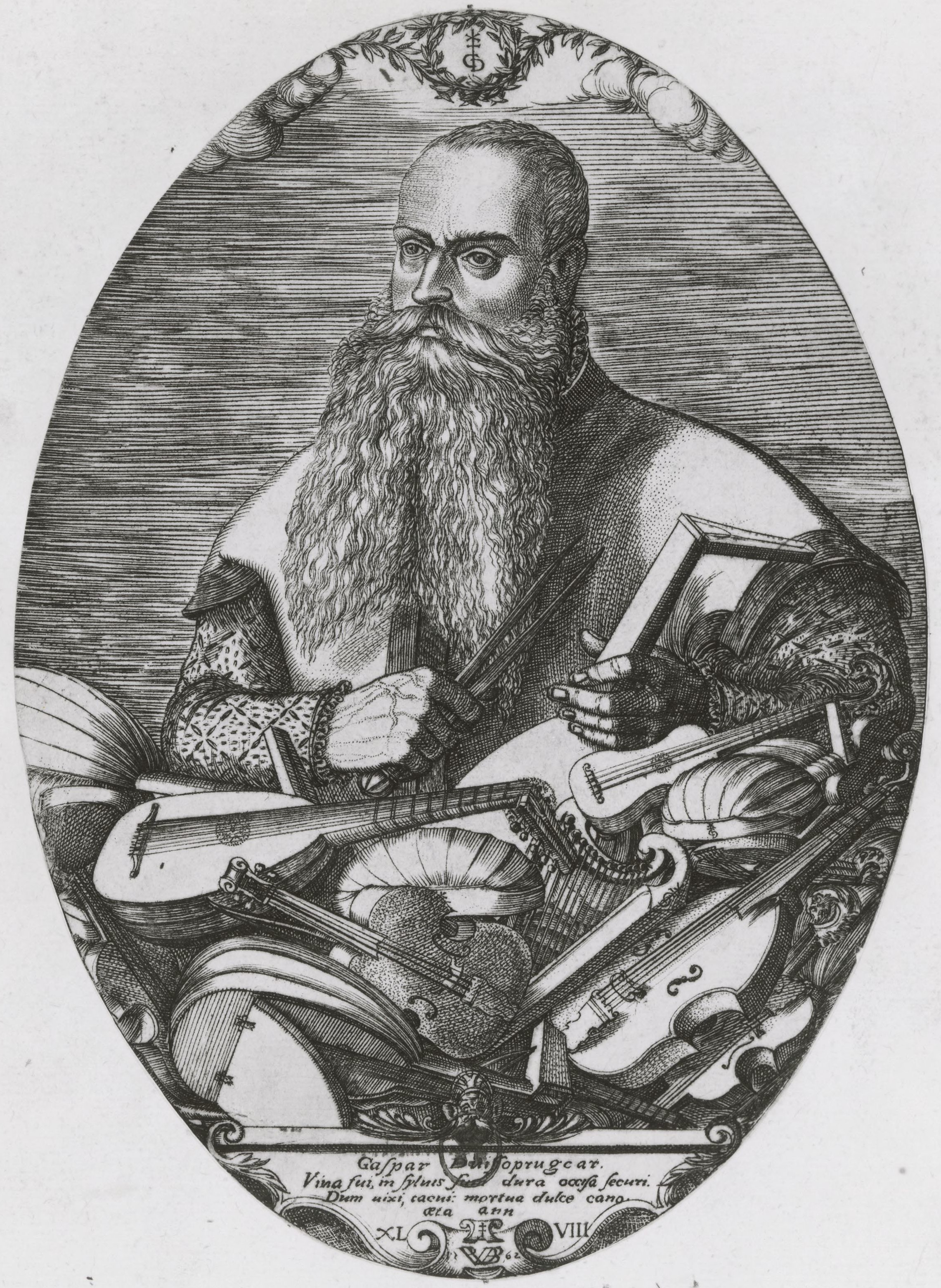
Gasparo Duiffopruggar (1514 - c. 1570) - Engraving by Pierre Woeiriot (1532–1599) Viva fui in sylvis, sum dura occisa securi, dum vixi, tacui, mortua dulce cano

=== Shaping of wood with acoustics and resonance aims ===
This shaping of the wood is known as "resonance plate tuning" (or "plate tuning"). It refers to a comprehensive tuning of the wood and bracing (its density, thickness, tension, sound-influence) to influence the acoustic properties. It does not refer to a tuning of the guitar-body to a single "default" frequency. Instead, it is a comprehensive way of shaping the wood and its response and resonance properties to improve the guitar's sound. The "tuning" of the wood is also called "voicing" the instrument. The techniques used trace to previous centuries, especially in violin-making (example: attempt at understanding some of the tuning schemes of Italian violins: 1, 2).

Some guitarmakers believe that the actual voicing of the wood, and working with and "shaping" the wood (during and even after construction) is more important than the outer construction itself (such as chosen bracing):
"As my skill and experience have grown I have come to believe that what makes a good guitar good is firstly how well fine tuned and balanced it is rather than what type of strutting system it is built with. Different strutting systems can add different flavours to the sound but is never the main factor in the Good Guitar." (Per Hallgren)

=== Sound characteristics (Timbre) ===
==== Spectrum ====
One of the important aspects that good luthiers need to understand, is that a single tone consists of the "fundamental and simultaneous overtones". (Historically the scientific analysis of this discovery can be associated with Nicole Oresme, Marin Mersenne and Joseph Sauveur.) The ratio of the "intensity of fundamental" and the various overtones, defines the "colour" (Frequency spectrum) of the tone. Overtones are simply frequencies that are at a multiple of the base fundamental frequency. (Overtones defining colour, do not only occur in instruments, but also in the human voice. When singing a note, there are multiple overtones present. Singers experienced in overtone singing are able to control their voice in such a way, that they can increase the intensity of any high overtone to such an extent, that it becomes clearly audible, whilst simultaneously singing the fundamental. In this way two pitches (fundamental and high-intensity overtone) can be made clearly audible while singing.)

Tonal colour is an important characteristic on a guitar. Usually the notes of the guitar's different registers (low bass, mid-range, high, etc.) have different colour-spectrums, i.e., differing relative intensities of fundamental to different overtones.

Various types of guitars have tone-differences in the various registers (also differences in response, action, etc.). Specific colour-spectrum characteristics of certain types of guitars can be said to form a specific "sound aesthetic"—this is like a "fingerprint" of the characteristic of that type of guitar. Other guitars have a different "sound aesthetic", i.e., a different colour-spectrum characteristic. Different historic instruments reflect various sound aesthetics.

==== Temporal change of spectrum (attack/onset, decay) ====
Important in characterizing the sound of instruments (or more precisely, notes of particular registers), is how the player initiates the sound. This is the attack or onset: a short-duration transient. This occurs at the moment when a string is plucked - the string builds up motion for some time, before it can vibrate in the normal way. The attack is nonlinear and usually has high-pitched frequencies present. The duration of the transient (until normal string vibration continues) and frequencies occurring during the transient, are an important factor in how we perceive the tone.

Once the string is in its normal mode of vibration, the standard colour-spectrum is present. As time progresses the amplitude of the vibrations decreases, and usually the intensities of higher pitched overtones decay at a faster rate than the intensities of fundamental and lower overtones (thus a change of colour over the vibrating-time).

In this way one can observe the acoustic "envelope": the attack, followed by the way the intensity of frequencies (fundamental and overtones) decrease with time. The "envelope" can thus be regarded as the temporal change of the spectrum of the sound. This envelope is different for notes in different registers.

Thus the tone or timbre is determined by:

- Attack or onset (how long until normal vibration of the string? -> response of the guitar)
- Relative intensities of frequency spectrum: fundamental to overtones (defines colour -> colour change over vibrating time, since the higher-freq overtones decay quicker)

These factors can be influenced by the shaping of the wood. A good luthier understands how to shape the wood to directly influence these acoustic properties.

Guitar players can actively vary the timbre by the way they pluck the string—by changing the nail or finger angle, the distance from the bridge, etc. A good instrument helps the musician produce widely varying timbres and have yet have good resonance. Nevertheless, a default colour and response is identifiable for notes in the different registers and define the instrument's sound.

=== Styles of "sound aesthetic" ===
As was mentioned, it is possible to group historic instruments according to the colour and response sound characteristic (present for notes in the various registers). A baroque guitar has a different "sound aesthetic" than a 19th-century guitar, i.e. a differing colour-spectrum in the various registers (low, mid, high) and a different duration of attack (response of the instrument).

The "sound aesthetic" is determined by the sound characteristic of notes in specific registers (an instrument's low notes has a different relative timbre, than its high notes).

There is a historical parallel between musical styles (baroque, classical, romantic, Spanish nationalist, flamenco, jazz) and the style of "sound aesthetic" of the musical instruments used: Robert de Visée played on a baroque guitar with a different sound aesthetic than the guitars used by Mauro Giuliani or Luigi Legnani - they used 19th-century guitars.

Whilst the difference between baroque guitars and 19th-century guitars is large and immediately obvious, one can also identify differences in style within the 19th-century guitars themselves: They are part of the same family, but one can distinguish early Italian instruments (Fabricatore), then French instruments and Viennese instruments, etc.

==== Guitar making in the 19th century ====
To get a picture some of the ideas on guitar-building from the 19th century, some newspaper reports of guitar-related patents (note that the newspaper reports given in the cross-references are only brief mentionings, with the actual patent papers providing more details and drawings etc.) and other newspaper writings are listed:

- Arzberger
- Johann Georg Staufer and Johann Ertl
- Bernhard Enzensperger
- Franz Besetzny
- Wenzel Soukup
- Lacôte, Carulli: Décacorde
- J.F. Salomon: Harpolyre
- Ventura: Harp Ventura (modification of harp and guitar)

There are also 19th-century mentionings of Lacôte winning a prize for the quality of his instrument - the second prize went to Laprevotte. In the competition organized by Makaroff, it was the guitar of Scherzer that took first place.

Guitars in the 19th century were initially all ladder-braced and had their tonal energy spread over a lot of overtones (a desirable characteristic in instruments of the early classical and romantic era), as opposed to the more fundamental-rich guitars of Torres. Francisco Sanguino was one of the first to experiment with fan-bracing, then came Páges and Panormo—but Torres did not use it, so Panormo and Páges still had more tonal energy spread over overtones, compared to the Torres guitars, which focus tonal energy more in the fundamental (desirable in Spanish music).

== Movable frets ==
To solve all guitar intonation problems, or help guitarists use different musical temperaments (or to play microtonal music) it is necessary for the frets on the guitar to be adjustable. Work in this field began in the 19th century, when Thomas Perronet Thompson (1783–1869) wrote a work on the Enharmonic Guitar, with ideas used by Panormo. Lacôte also built a "guitare enharmonique" with movable frets.

The luthier Walter J. Vogt (1935–1990) developed a contemporary mechanism with movable frets, now also used by other luthiers e.g. Herve R. Chouard. Tolgahan Cogulu has also designed an "adjustable microtonal guitar" in 2008, based on Vogt's design.

Other concepts for changeable frets, include removable detachable fingerboards: "switchboards".

See also: article "Just guitar" by John Schneider

== Contemporary classical guitar making ==
The basis of most modern classical guitar designs was developed by Spanish luthier Antonio Torres Jurado in the mid-19th century. Earlier guitars were often smaller bodied (though there are exceptions: Scherzer, Guadagnini, etc.). Torres created a Spanish design, with light materials supported by fan bracing. Torres' fan bracing was influential for modern classical guitars: it consists of wooden strips glued inside the body to provide support and particular deep resonance that is saturated in fundamental. (However, a type of fan bracing was already used before, in some guitars by the Spanish builder Joseph Páges, and after him Louis Panormo used a fan bracing too in some of his guitars from 1823 to 1854; but both Páges' and Panormo's guitars have a different sound aesthetic to Torres' guitars.) Torres used a string scale-length of 650 mm, which is usually the standard length for today's modern classical guitars.

The designs Torres developed were later adapted by several influential luthiers; Manuel Ramirez (1864–1916) and his brother José Ramírez (1858–1923), Hermann Hauser, Sr. (1882–1952) and Ignacio Fleta (1897–1977). More contemporary luthiers such as Robert Bouchet and Victor Bedikian also use the ideas and designs of Torres, Hauser, and Fleta in their own guitars. Some luthiers experiment with their own bracing, and some also offer cutaway, acoustic electric and composite top models.

For the soundboard of the guitar, the wood that has been traditionally used is spruce (commonly Engelmann spruce or Sitka spruce). In the 1960s. Western Red Cedar (Thuja plicata) became popular after its introduction by the Spanish luthier Jose Ramirez III, and it continues to be commonly used as an alternative to spruce. Spruce soundboards are recognised as giving great clarity and dynamic range, but take time to reach their full potential, while cedar gives a warmer tone with less clarity, and does not need time to improve.

For years, Brazilian rosewood was the industry standard as the best wood for the backs and sides of guitars. Unfortunately, the export of Brazilian rosewood has been restricted due to the endangerment of the species. Much of the Brazilian rosewood used for guitars is of poor quality, and the inflated price of the wood has caused some luthiers to search for alternative tonewoods. There are many other good very dry woods for guitar construction. Of the surviving Torres instruments, the most common back and side wood used was maple. Many guitars made today use East Indian Rosewood because it is a close substitute for Brazilian rosewood, is readily available in high-quality, and has desirable characteristics as tonewood. There are other woods with the characteristics to make excellent guitars and are excellent alternatives: cocobolo, maple, bubinga (African rosewood), African blackwood, Camatillo rosewood, Spanish cypress (used exclusively for flamenco guitars), granadillo, ebony, satinwood, ziricote, among others, are excellent choices for backs and sides.

== Contemporary Innovations ==
=== Lattice braced guitars ===
The Australian guitarmaker Greg Smallman introduced guitars with an extremely thin soundboard, which is supported by bracing in the shape of a lattice. Smallman combines this with heavier, laminated back and sides with a frame. Smallman is well known for building the guitars played by John Williams. A large number of luthiers worldwide have incorporated Smallman's design innovations into their own guitars.

=== Double-top, sandwich-top and composite-top ===
The terms double-top, sandwich-top, and composite-top all refer to a relatively new way to construct the soundboard of a guitar, developed by Matthias Dammann in Germany in the late 1980s. Other luthiers such as Robert Ruck, Fritz Mueller, Jim Redgate, Michel Bruck, Boguslaw Teryks and Gernot Wagner have since adopted the method. A double top usually consists of a material called Nomex sandwiched by two thin sheets of tonewood. A flame resistant meta-aramid (a polymer used to make synthetic fiber) material, Nomex was originally designed by DuPont Chemical Co. in the 1960s as a lightweight material for use in the aviation industry. Luthiers use the honeycomb sheet (calendered paper) version of the product: the low mass, strength, and ease of shaping make it ideally suited for guitar soundboards. Though the construction of a double top significantly differs from the traditional soundboard, a double top guitar often looks just like a traditional guitar. A thin soundboard is often incorporated and used to obtain the most vibration and to allow for optimal sound.

=== Criticism of Lattice Bracing, Double Tops, etc. ===
While some people are positive towards innovations that directly affect a guitar's loudness, prefer the full round bodied tone, change in tone that can come with it (if done well), and feel that the loudness of some of these guitars (in particular Smallman guitars) is a by-product of their musical qualities rather than an end in itself; there are also a number of people who are generally critical of the tonal qualities of these guitars; why should guitar makers devote so much time in producing loud guitars with a thin sound, when the vast majority of guitarists do not need an exceptionally loud guitars?

=== Side Soundport ===
A number of luthiers are now incorporating a soundport, an additional small soundhole on the guitar's side, usually facing the player. This is said to allow air to move more freely in and out of the body of the guitar as it is vibrating, and to have the advantage of allowing the player to better hear the sound projecting from the guitar. The only published formal research on the latter subject suggests however that players may not be able to hear any difference in a soundport equipped guitar.

=== Finger board ===
Improvement of intonation and playability.

==== Elevated fingerboard ====
Some guitar makers like American Thomas Humphrey (who patented such a system in US patent 4,873,909), Italian guitarmaker Renato Barone, Frenchman Antoine Pappalardo, and the Canadian Fritz Mueller, make elevated fingerboard guitars. The primary advantage is to improve left hand playability on the upper frets, although the increased distance between the strings and the top is also advantageous for the right hand. The elevated fingerboard is visually unobtrusive from the front, and the instrument retains its traditional appearance.

==== Curved fingerboard ====
Some guitar makers like the French Antoine Pappalardo make a Curved fingerboard to improve the playability.

==== High frets ====
High frets facilitate vibrato and barreing, and generally aid in the development of a "lighter" left hand.

==== Multiple scale length fretboards ====
The 17th-century wire-strung instruments, Orpharion and Bandora are early examples of instruments featuring multiple scale fretboards.

==== Armrest ====
An armrest provides three primary benefits: it lessens damping of the top caused by the right forearm; it is potentially more comfortable for the player; and it absorbs the wear to the finish that would otherwise happen on the top, the binding, and the side. These benefits are of particular importance for ultra-thin-topped instruments, such as Smallman's, but could subtly improve any guitar, including double-tops.

== The state of classical guitar making ==
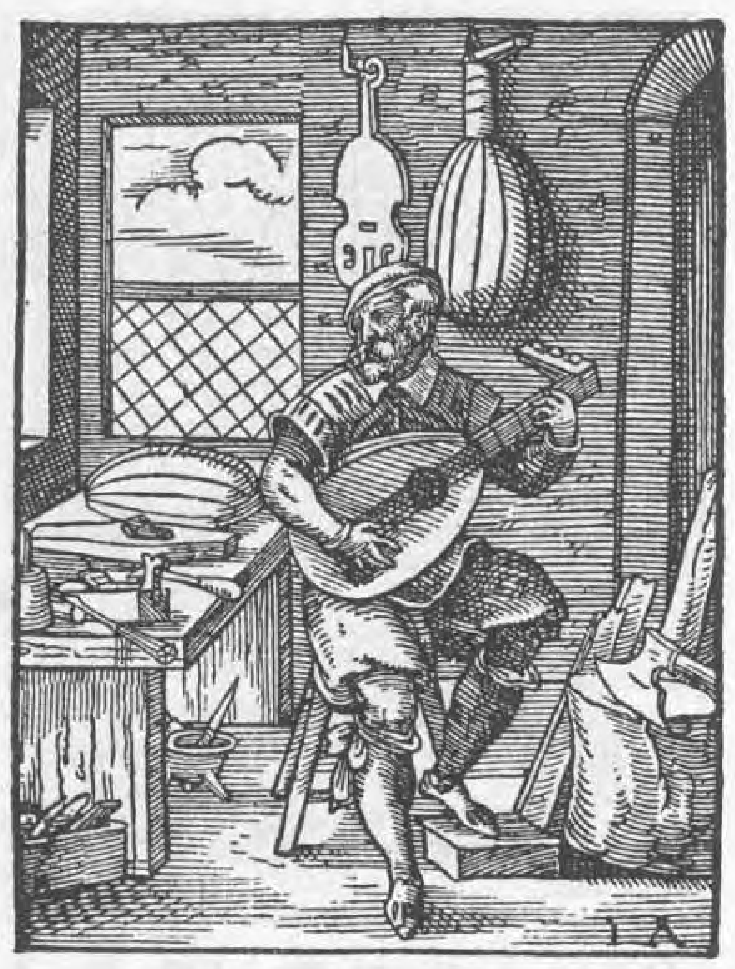
Der Lautenmacher (The lute maker) by Jost Amman (1539–1591)

While most classical guitar makers are today mainly concerned with making modern classical guitars with their typical fan-bracing or experimenting to make the instrument louder (e.g., "thin-top lattice-braced", "double-top", with results that are not without criticism); they seem to give little consideration to historical sound ideals, or to tuning and voicing of the parts of the instrument.

On the other hand, there are opinions that those guitar makers who openly refer to using plate tuning, may be using it more as a marketing gimmick, than something that they truly understand; and has a marked influence on the instrument's sound.

- "[...] my building technique doesn't include "component tuning." My experience of thirty five years has led me to the conclusion that "tuning" the sound of a guitar is an illusion and a chimera, and those who publicly advocate that they can accurately control the response of a guitar by responding to noises derived from tapping parts of it, are simply seducing the innocent, or at best, self-deluded." (William R. Cumpiano on "Tap Tuning")

And yet: plate tuning (voicing the instrument) is a significant part of violin-making culture—recently considerable advances have been made in the voicing of violins, so that modern violins by some makers are finally beginning to compete tonally with the best violins of the past (Stradivari, Guarneri, Amati, etc.). In fact, top violinists who traditionally played Stradivari, are now slowly beginning to use modern violins (this was rather uncommon up till recently). Making an exact copy does not guarantee an instrument with sound qualities identical to the original. There is, however, some evidence that violinists may be under some similar self-delusion as regards the end result of these efforts on the finished violin.

Thus, while some consider that in this respect (and considerations of sound aesthetic), that guitar making today is still lagging behind professional violin-making, the scientific evidence is ambiguous, at best.

In violin culture multiple good old master-violins have been analyzed for their sound qualities (e.g. Stradivari, or Guarneri are favoured by a number of people; though some consider these instruments as too "outwardly" loud, yet lacking the "inner" tonal qualities of say Amati).

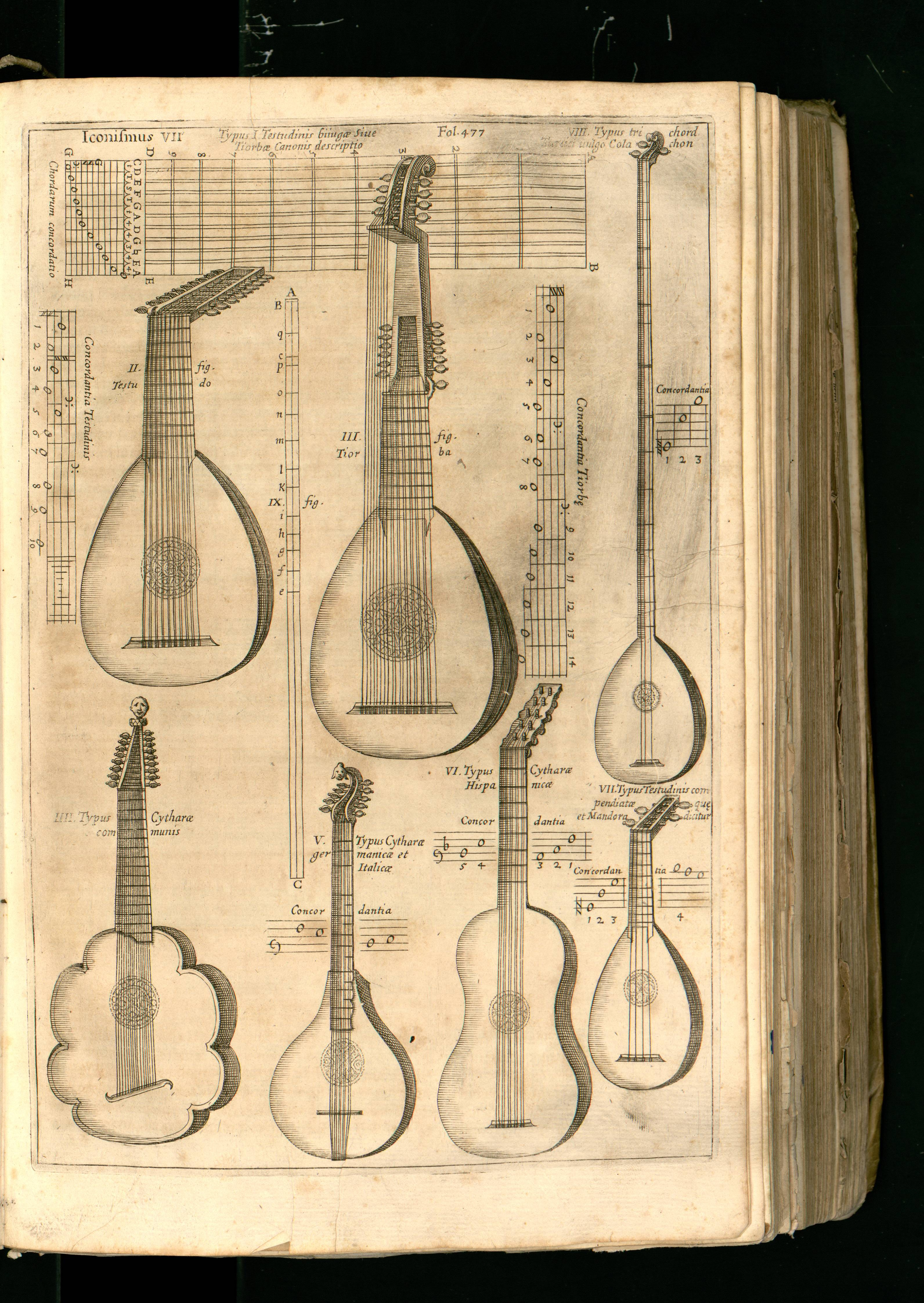
Plucked instruments from Musurgia universalis (1650) by Athanasius Kircher (1602–1680).

In guitar making, it is in multiple cases more difficult to find similarly idealized instruments for a number of reasons:

- There are multiple guitar traditions still currently active, each with its own ideals of tone, voicing, projection, etc. The flamenco tradition, for example, favors a very different kind of instrument construction from that of the concert classical guitar. And the ideal concert instrument for concerto performance with orchestra may not be the best choice for solo or salon-ensemble playing.
- There are not many guitars still in existence, from the period that some people consider the "Golden Age of Acoustics or instrument making" (17th and 18th centuries); e.g. there are only five guitars from Stradivari still known to exist and luthiers and players are unlikely to have even heard them to judge their tonal quality.
- As can be seen from violin making, there was a decrease in luthiers' tonal quality in the 19th century, when compared to the "Golden Age" (some people attribute this to luthiers' greater focus on the visible aspects, as opposed to the sound itself). Also, in this time, the guitar went through a number of different outer shapes, and luthiers also had to cater for guitar demands from many amateurs at the time; so ultimately, for any given instrument from about 1800 to 1900, it could be one of high tonal quality, but might just as well be a mediocre instrument; or one with a design and tonal characteristic, that was later abandoned by the maker (though there are 19th-century guitar-makers such as Lacôte and Scherzer, who are generally considered as having built guitars with high tonal quality).
- Most guitars today are still built using Spanish Torres or post-Torres fan-bracing. This has become the de facto classical guitar instrument today, but while being suitable for most modern Spanish repertoire, it is rather unsuitable for much of the earlier repertoire from the baroque, classical and romantic era. Neither guitarists, nor luthiers have a lot of knowledge on earlier design idioms, or sound aesthetics; though this is improving with an increasing interest in historically informed performance; and luthiers who do not only limit themselves and their interests to guitars (but also consider violin-making culture, lute-making culture (ladder-bracing!) and draw parallels).

The de facto standard classical guitar today is the Spanish guitar: usually fan-braced and strong in fundamental. While fan-braced Spanish (Torres, post-Torres style) instruments coexisted with traditional central European ladder-braced (19th-century style) guitars at the beginning of the 20th century, the central European guitars eventually fell away. Some attribute this to the popularity of Segovia, considering him "the catalyst for change toward the Spanish design and the so-called 'modern' school in the 1920s and beyond". The styles of music performed on ladder-braced guitars, were becoming more and more unfashionable; and e.g. in Germany musicians were in part turning towards folk-style music (Schrammel-music and the Contraguitar), which only remained localized in Germany, etc. On the other hand, Segovia was concertizing around the world popularizing his Spanish guitar, as well as a new style of music in the 1920s: Spanish romantic-modern style, with guitar works by Moreno Torroba, de Falla, etc.

In fact, Segovia's Santos Hernandez (Ramirez) guitar from 1912, has a slightly different sound aesthetic, than the earlier Torres design. While the Torres is a guitar that some consider more appropriate to the salon style music of Tarrega, Arcas or Llobet (or arrangements of Granados, Albeniz), the later romantic-modern style of Moreno Torroba (whom Segovia met in 1918), Castelnuovo-Tedesco (whom Segovia met in 1932), etc.—combined with requirements of performing in large concert halls—was uniquely suited to Segovia's performance on the Santos Hernandez and later on the multiple Hauser guitars (1929, 1931, 1937, etc.) that he owned.

Yet "Andrés Segovia presented the Spanish guitar as a versatile model for all playing styles", to the extent that still today, "many guitarists have tunnel-vision to the world of guitar, coming from the modern Segovia tradition of revisionism". Torres and post-Torres style modern guitars with their fan-bracing, have a thick and strong tone: but they are considered too saturated in fundamental for earlier repertoire (Classical/Romantic: Carulli, Sor, Giuliani, Mertz, ...; Baroque: de Visee, ...; etc.).

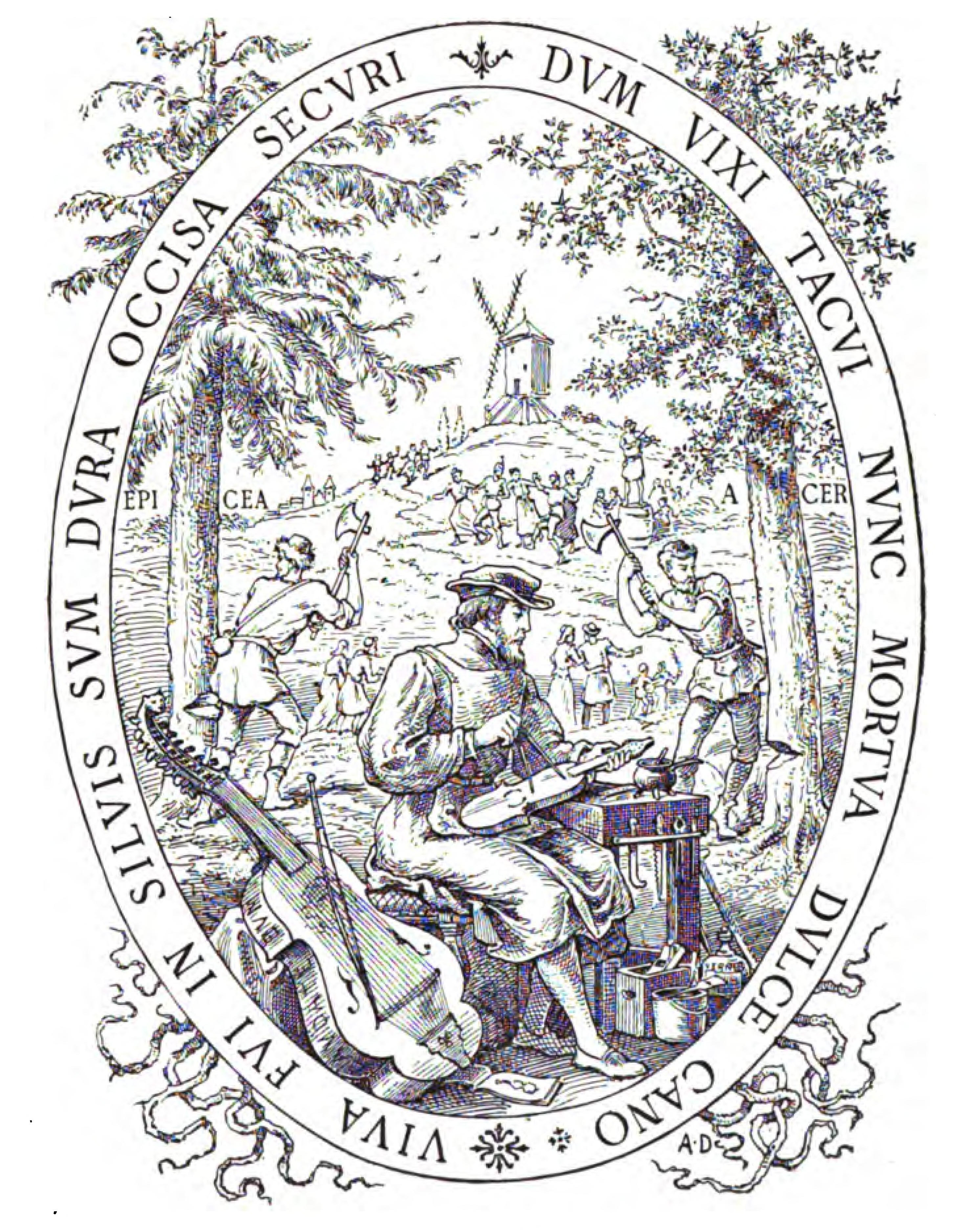
Cover art of L'art du Luthier by Auguste Tolbecque (1830–1919)

Torres and post-Torres guitars have a strong thick sound (not to be confused with rich overtones, since these guitars are rather saturated in fundamental).

- "With the change of music a stronger fundamental was demanded and the fan bracing system was approached. [...] the guitar tone has been changed from a transparent tone, rich in higher partials to a more "broad" tone with a strong fundamental."

The sound aesthetic of early romantic guitars (such as Lacôte) on the other hand, has stronger overtones (yet without being starved in fundamental—which would again be undesirable). This stronger overtone presence is due to the ladder-bracing and soundboard design, and the particular voicing of the instrument. A comparison with lutes (ladder bracing) can be made, which also have strong overtones, which gives these instruments (lutes, early romantic guitars) a type of "inner" vulnerability, lacking in the modern guitars. (In fact there are people who claim that a performer's interpretational style is psychologically related to the instrument's aesthetic; and that this can even be observed in contemporary recordings, e.g., Bach's lute works as performed on lute(with convincing expressive phrasing), versus the markedly different interpretations of these works on the modern classical guitar. Alternately, the Spanish repertoire such as Moreno Torroba, would be completely unfitting, for a lute or early-guitar sound aesthetic.)

Some parlor guitar players, who played on smaller and narrower guitars, consider ladder bracing necessary for achieving the desired "old-time sound".

With an increase in interest in historically informed interpretation, there are more and more luthiers that are beginning to look at traditions of guitar building.

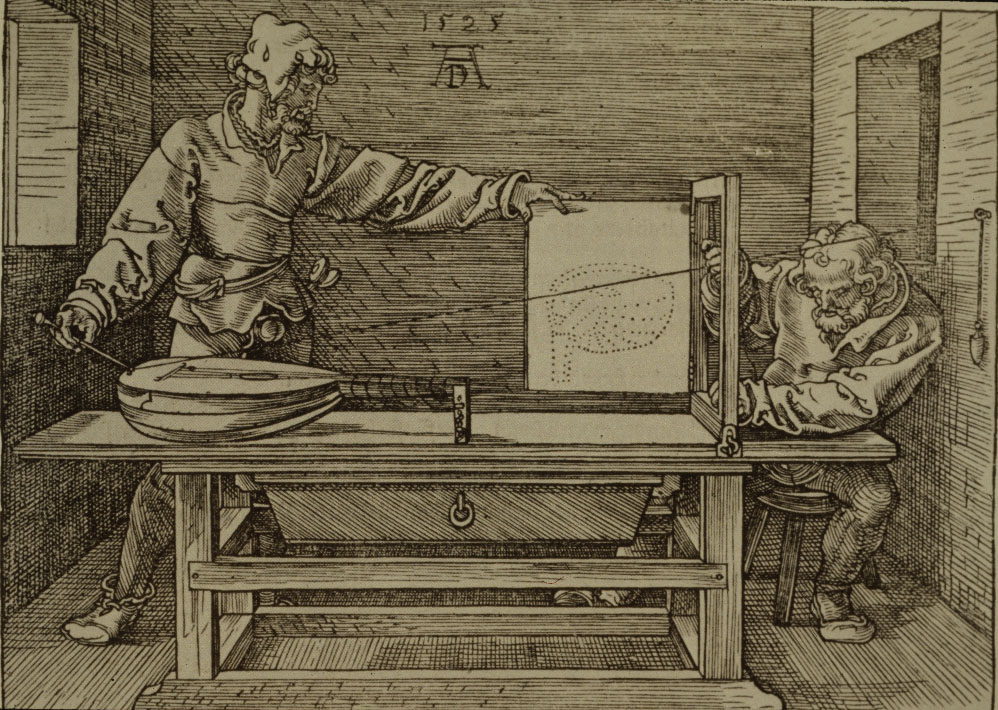
Man drawing a lute by Albrecht Dürer (1471–1528)

Some contemporary luthiers suggest building historic instruments based not only on outer visual details, but based on acoustic principles from master luthiers of the 17th and 18th centuries, leaning towards and learning from the great makers (Stradivari, Amati, Ruckers, etc.). Drawing a parallel to violin-making culture, and lutherie as a broader art, it might be interesting to deriving indications for the possible aims and ideals of "sound aesthetic in guitars" from other instruments (e.g., of the "Golden Age of Acoustics"), which would open up the possibility of tonally competing with luthiers from earlier periods, instead of only visually imitating and copying them.

== See also ==
- Luthier
- Lucien Gélas
- Brahms guitar
- Classical guitar strings
- Classical guitar accessories
