= Grenade (disambiguation) =

A grenade is a small explosive device which is hand thrown at its target.

Grenade may also refer to:

== Armed forces ==
- Grenade (insignia), on military uniforms
- Operation Grenade, an American World War II plan
- HMS Grenade (H86), a British Royal Navy destroyer

== Places ==
- Grenade, Haute-Garonne département, France
- Grenade-sur-l'Adour, Landes département, France

== Music ==
- "Grenade", pseudonym of the electronic musician Paul Kalkbrenner
- "Grenade" (song), a song by Bruno Mars
- "La grenade", a song by Clara Luciani

== Other ==
- "Grenade", the third episode in the television series Pluribus
- Hand Grenade (cocktail)

== See also ==
- Granada (disambiguation)
- Grenada (disambiguation)
- Kingdom of Granada (disambiguation)
- Grenadier
- Grenadine (disambiguation)
- Pomegranate (disambiguation)
