= Granada (board game) =

2009 Alhambra-spin-off Eurogame with a financial theme

Granada is a 2009 German-style board game developed by Dirk Henn and published by Queen Games. It is based on and heavily inspired by Henn's earlier game, the Spiel des Jahres-winning Alhambra. Due to its similar theme, it is published as a "standalone game in the Alhambra family".

== Gameplay ==
Gameplay is, for the most part, similar to Alhambra, consisting of a deck of currency cards of various values in four currencies, a bag of building tiles of various prices, and a building market board which also serves as the game's scoring track. At the start of the game, each player is given one starting tile and a number of currency cards such that the total value is greater than or equal to 20. A "currency market" is set up, consisting of four cards, and the tile market is established, consisting of four tiles, each assigned to a specific currency. The set of tiles connected to a player's starting tile is termed their "Granada".

Unlike Alhambra, tiles are double-sided, with an even value on one side and the next higher odd value on the other. At the start of the game, the four tiles in the tile market is placed with their even-side placed up. Each tile consists of a type of building (there are nine types in the game), and moats on up to three sides. Tiles typically have different buildings on each side, though the moats are identically arranged on both sides.

Players, on their turns, may perform one of the following:

- Draw currency cards - either one card may be taken from the currency market, or multiple cards with combined value no greater than 5 may be taken.
- Purchase building tiles - by discarding currency cards of the one type of combined value greater than or equal to the value printed on the tile assigned to the currency in the tile market, a player may purchase the tile and either place it in their reserve or in their Granada. A player may also choose to flip the tile over before placing it: if the player chooses to flip the tile and immediately place it in their Granada, a number of currency cards with combined value at least 3 must be discarded; flipping the tile and placing it in the reserve is free. Once placed tiles may not be flipped for the remainder of the game.
- Move building tiles - a player may either place a tile from their reserve, remove a tile from their Granada, or swap a tile from their reserve with one from their Granada.

At the end of a player's turn, currency cards and building tiles are added to any empty spaces in the currency or tile markets. Tiles are placed odd-side up if they were placed even-side up the last time the tile market has been replenished, and vice versa.

At the start of the game, two scoring cards are placed in the deck, roughly one-third and two-thirds through the deck. When a scoring card is drawn, or when there are fewer than four tiles left to be sold, scoring occurs. Each player scores one point for each moat side on the perimeter of their Granada, and the players with the most buildings of each type in their Granada score points according to that type (ties are broken based on having the most expensive tile of the type purchased). In the first scoring, only the player with the most buildings of a type score one point for each building of that type, while in the second round of scoring the player with the most buildings scores two points per building and the runner-up one. In the final scoring, the player with the most buildings scores three points per building, followed by two and one points, respectively, for the first and second runners up. The player with the most points at the end of the final scoring wins.
