= Granadilla =

Granadilla may refer to:

== Plants ==
- Granadilla, a taxonomic synonym for the flowering plant species genus Passiflora
- Passion fruit (fruit), also known as Granadilla, a common name for fruit of Passiflora species
- Giant granadilla (Passiflora quadrangularis)
- Sweet granadilla (Passiflora ligularis)

== Places ==
- Port of Granadilla, a port located in the municipality of Granadilla de Abona
- Granadilla de Abona, a municipality of Tenerife in the Canary Islands
- Granadilla, Spain, a ghost town in Extremadura

== Football clubs ==
- Atlético Granadilla, a men's football club in Granadilla de Abona
- UD Granadilla Tenerife, a women's football club in Granadilla de Abona

== See also ==
- Granada (disambiguation)
- Granadillo (disambiguation)
- Grenadilla (Dalbergia melanoxylon), a flowering plant in the family Fabaceae
- La Granadella, a town in the autonomous community of Catalonia in northeast Spain
