= Metro (board game) =

Board game by Dirk Henn

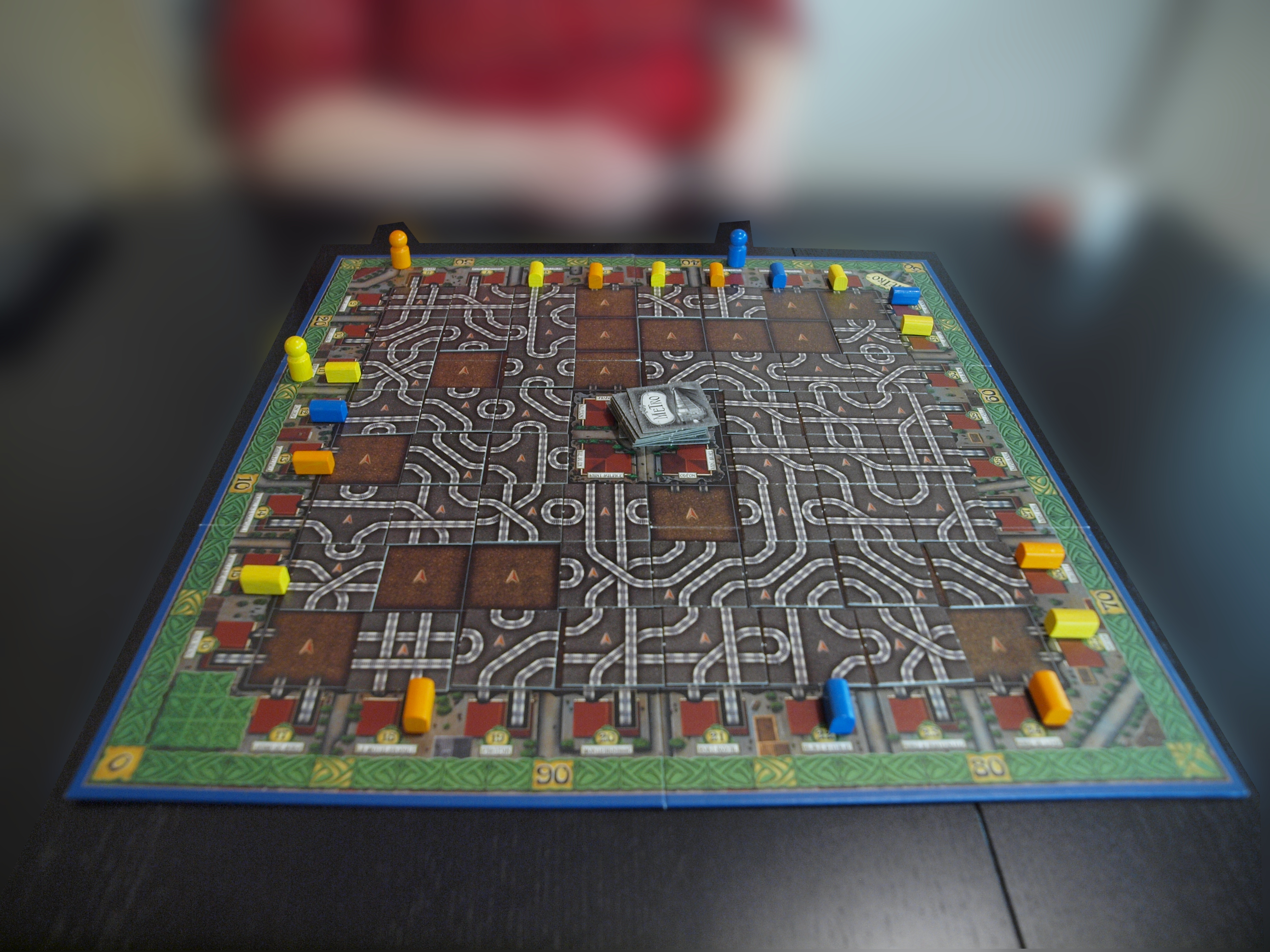
- A three-player game of Metro in the middle of play.
- Other names: Iron Horse
- Designers: Dirk Henn
- Illustrators: Franz Vohwinkel
- Publishers: db-Spiele (1997), Queen Games (2000), Tactic, Überplay
- Publication: 1997, 2000
- Genres: Board game
- Players: 2–6
- Setup time: 5 minutes
- Playing time: 45 minutes
- Chance: Low
- Skills: Route planning

Metro is a board game by Dirk Henn, for 2 to 6 players.

Queen Games produced the game in 2000 after Henn had published it as Iron Horse in the company db-Spiele in 1997.

The game was nominated in the Spiel des Jahres awards in 2000 and was one of the finalists in the Gamers Choice Award in 2001. It was also awarded the Mensa Select award in 2001.

== Contents ==
- 1 foldable game board
- 60 track tiles
- 6 overview boards in various player colours
- 61 metro trains
- 6 score counters
- 1 rulebook

== Rules ==
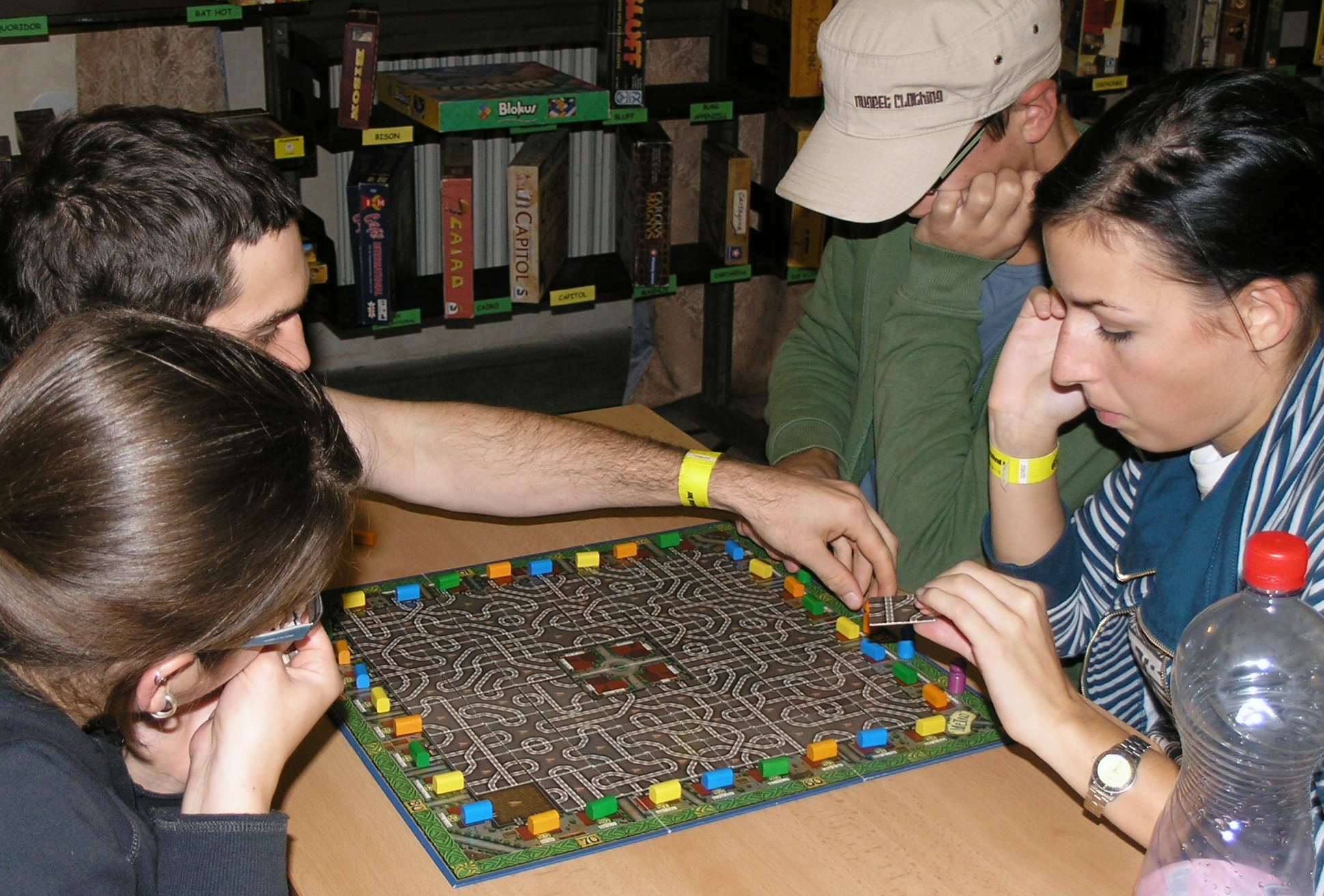
A four-player game of Metro being played in the Czech Republic in 2008.

=== Background ===
The players take the role of metro track designers who are building the Paris Metro to be opened in the 1900 World's Fair.

=== Game board ===
The game board is square and consists of 10×10 places, of which the four corners remain free. The squares on the edges between the corners represent metro stations, of which each player is assigned a certain number. Connecting these stations with metro tracks earns points; the 2×2 place square in the middle represents the main stations, connecting to which earns double points. The 60 remaining squares are free to build tracks onto.

=== Objective ===
The objective of the game is to build the longest track connections between as many metro stations as possible. Each track connection earns points, and the player with the most points at the end of the game wins.

=== Course of the game ===
The players take turns. The current player takes a track tile face down at random. The player then has a choice between placing the tile on the board or taking another tile, which they must then place on the board. If the tile placed completes one or more metro train tracks, these are scored. The turn then ends.

=== End of the game ===
The game ends when all stations have been connected with metro tracks or when all tiles have been placed on the board.

== Variations ==
The game can be varied by replacing the initial quite large random chance with strategy. This is done by allowing rotation of the tiles, which is not allowed in the basic game. Another variation is to give each player a specific number of tiles in their hand, so the players have a better chance to plan their routes in advance.

== Cable Car ==
In 2009, Queen Games published the game San Francisco Cable Car based on Metro and Iron Horse; The setting was changed and more variations in developing businesses were added. In this variation the colours do not correspond to the players. Instead, players buy stock of metro companies (colours). The players then earn points based on the amount of stock they own in the businesses.
