= Kingdom of Granada (disambiguation) =

Emirate of Granada was an Islamic realm in southern Iberia during the Late Middle Ages

Kingdom of Granada may also refer to:

in Europe

- Taifa of Granada, earlier state ruled by the Zirids from 1013 to 1090
- Kingdom of Granada (Crown of Castile), a territorial jurisdiction of the Crown of Castile from 1492 until 1833

in America

- New Kingdom of Granada, the name given to a group of colonial provinces in northern South America, an area corresponding mainly to modern-day Colombia
- Viceroyalty of New Granada, the name given to the jurisdiction of the Spanish Empire in northern South America, corresponding to modern Colombia, Ecuador, Panama and Venezuela

== See also ==
- Grenada (disambiguation)
- Granada (disambiguation)
- Grenade (disambiguation)
