= Lucien Gélas =

French musician

Lucien Gélas (1 January 1873 or 12 January 1873 – 5 June 1944) was a luthier, classical guitarist, and teacher.

Gélas was born in Menton, Alpes Maritimes. He composed for solo guitar and as well as works for voice and guitar set to his own texts. Gélas owned the complete historic works of Sor as published by Meissonnier (Paris 1820–1836) and Pacini (1830–1836). The works are now a part of the Spencer Collection at the Royal Academy of Music in London.

== Gélas Guitar (double-top guitar) ==
Gélas is well known for inventing and patenting a guitar design which uses a double top: It is often called a Gélas guitar, or a double-top guitar (or double-resonance-guitar) and was common in the first half of the 20th century.

Gélas was awarded a gold medal at the Bordeaux Exhibition in 1907 and a gold medal at the Brussels Exhibition in 1910 for his double-top instruments.

The two tops of the instruments have a resonating space between them. The inner top is not parallel to the outer one, such that the guitar can be observed to have a particular tilt. Also, the strings run through the bridge (which is on the inner top) and are attached at the bottom, in such a way that the plucked part of the string before the bridge is at an angle to the part of the string after the bridge. This is achieved by having the plucked part of the string slightly angled to the inner top (in conventional guitar it would be parallel), resulting in a raised tension in the inner top.

The patent was first filed in Paris in 1905; and the patent text is downloadable in French and English.

His guitars were played by numerous important artists, particularly in the first half of the 20th century. Heinrich Albert (1870–1950) obtained a Gélas guitar (from Gaudet in Paris) and ascribes his concert successes in a large part to the guitar, praising its carrying sound, ease of responsiveness, and tone-colour. Other players of Gélas guitars included Luise Walker (1910–1998) and Bruno Henze (1900–1978).

Gélas produced the instruments with the help of guitar-makers (following his patent), at first Théodore Gaudet and later Jean Roviès, Beuscher, Richard Jacob and others. The instruments included classical guitars, mandolins, jazz double-basses and Hawaiian guitars.

== See also ==
- Classical guitar making
