= Grenada (disambiguation) =

Grenada is an island country in the Caribbean.

Grenada may also refer to:

== Places ==
=== United States ===
- Grenada, California, a town
- Grenada, Mississippi, a city
- Grenada County, Mississippi, a county

=== New Zealand ===
- Grenada, New Zealand, a suburb in Wellington
- Grenada North, a suburb in Wellington

== Other uses ==
- Grenada (horse)

== See also ==
- Grenda (disambiguation)
- Granada (disambiguation)
- Grenade (disambiguation)
- Kingdom of Granada (disambiguation)
