= Shogun (2006 board game) =

Board Game

- Designers: Dirk Henn
- Publishers: Queen Games
- Players: 3–5
- Setup time: ~10 minutes
- Playing time: 150 minutes
- Chance: Low-Medium
- Age range: 12+
- Skills: Resource management

Shogun is a strategy board game designed by Dirk Henn and published by Queen Games in 2006. It is based on his earlier game Wallenstein, but it is set in the Sengoku period, which ends with the inception of the Tokugawa Shogunate.

== Background ==
The game is set in Japan during the Sengoku or "Warring States" period. Each player assumes the role of a great Daimyo with troops. Each Daimyo has the same ten possible actions to develop a kingdom and secure points. To do so, the Daimyo must deploy armies with great skill. Each round, the players decide which of the actions are to be played out and in which of their provinces. If battle ensues between opposing armies, the unique Cubetower plays the leading role. The troops from both sides are thrown in together and the cubes that fall out at the bottom show who has won immediately. Owning provinces, temples, theaters and castles means points when scores are tallied. Whichever Daimyo accumulates the greatest number of points after the second tally becomes shogun and wins the game.

== Equipment ==
=== Main game board ===
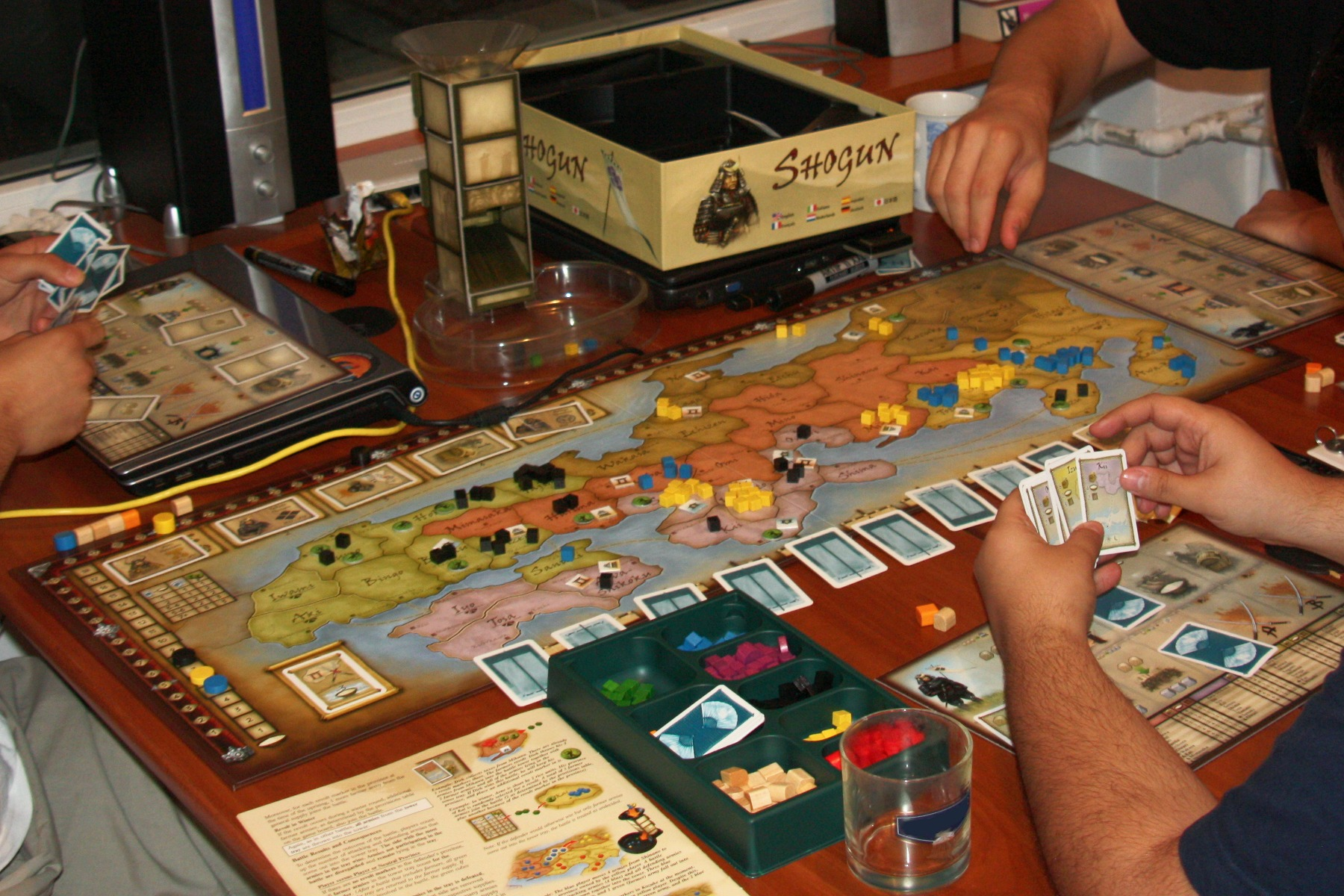
People playing Shogun

The main game board is printed on both sides, one being printed with a sun symbol and the other with a moon symbol. Each side displays five regions. These five regions each contain nine internal provinces. These configurations differ on either side of the board.

=== Cards ===
Shogun contains six different types of cards:

- Province Cards: For each province on the main game board there is a corresponding province card. If the province is shown on both sides, there will be two province cards; One with a sun symbol and one with a moon symbol indicating which side of the game board it corresponds to.
- War Chest Cards: Displaying war chests with values (0–4).
- Special Cards: This card grants the owner a unique ability. Every player receives one and only one.
- Action Cards: Determine the order in which game events take place.
- Event Cards: Display random events that affect all players.
- Daimyo Cards: Used to show player turn order.

=== Others ===
- Cubes: Shogun uses colored cubes to represent armies. There are 310 cubes in five colors (black, red, yellow, purple and blue), so that each color has 62 cubes. There are also plus 20 green cubes to represent neutral farmer armies.
- War Chests: 35 wood-colored chest with a value of 1, and 20 orange-colored chests with a value of 5.
- Building Tiles: 28 castles, 26 temples, and 26 theatres. Players may build these buildings in their provinces to earn victory points.
- Battle Tower: Used to conduct battles. Both the attacking and defending player resolve the battle by throwing their cubes in Battle Tower.

== Honors and awards ==
Shogun has received the following awards:

- Jogo do Ano Nominee (2006)
- Golden Geek Best Board Game Artwork/Presentation Nominee (2007)
- Golden Geek Best Gamer's Board Game Nominee (2007)
- Golden Geek Best Gamer's Board Game Winner (2007)
- Golden Geek Best Wargame Nominee (2007)
- Golden Geek Board Game of the Year Winner (2007)
- Nederlandse Spellenprijs Nominee (2007)
- Tric Trac d'Argent (2007)
- Tric Trac Nominee (2007)
- JoTa Best Wargame Nominee (2008)

== Reception ==
Alex Meehan of Dicebreaker called Shogun "one of the best board games of the modern era".

== Reviews ==
- Pyramid
- Rebel Times #4
