= Granada Theater =

Granada Theater may refer to:

- Granada Theater (Emporia, Kansas)
- Granada Theater (Kansas City, Kansas)
- Granada Theater (Lawrence, Kansas)
- Granada Theater (Dallas, Texas)
- Granada Theater (The Dalles, Oregon)
- Granada Theater (Wilmington, California)
- Granada Theater (Santa Barbara, California)

Granada Theatre may refer to:

- Granada Theatre, original name of and now the smaller screen at the Liberty Theatre in Camas, Washington
- Granada Theatre, Clapham Junction, London and others
- Granada Theatre (Chicago)
- Granada Theatre (Sherbrooke), Quebec
- Granada Theatre (Racine, Wisconsin), designed by J. Mandor Matson
- Granada Theatres Ltd, former cinema company and forerunner of Granada plc

== See also ==
- Granada Cinema (disambiguation), several cinemas owned by Granada Theatres Ltd
