= Wallenstein (board game) =

German-style board game

- Designers: Dirk Henn
- Publishers: Queen Games
- Players: 3 to 5
- Setup time: approx. 10 minutes
- Playing time: 90 - 120 minutes
- Chance: Medium-Low
- Age range: 12 years and up
- Skills: Resource Management, Area Control

Wallenstein is a medium-weight German-style board game designed by Dirk Henn and published by Queen Games in 2002. Though set during the Thirty Years' War, Wallenstein should not be confused with a complex wargame. Rather, it has the feel of a light strategy game with the familiar Euro elements of area control and resource management mixed in. As such, it has a wide range of appeal that attracts wargamers and non-wargamers alike.

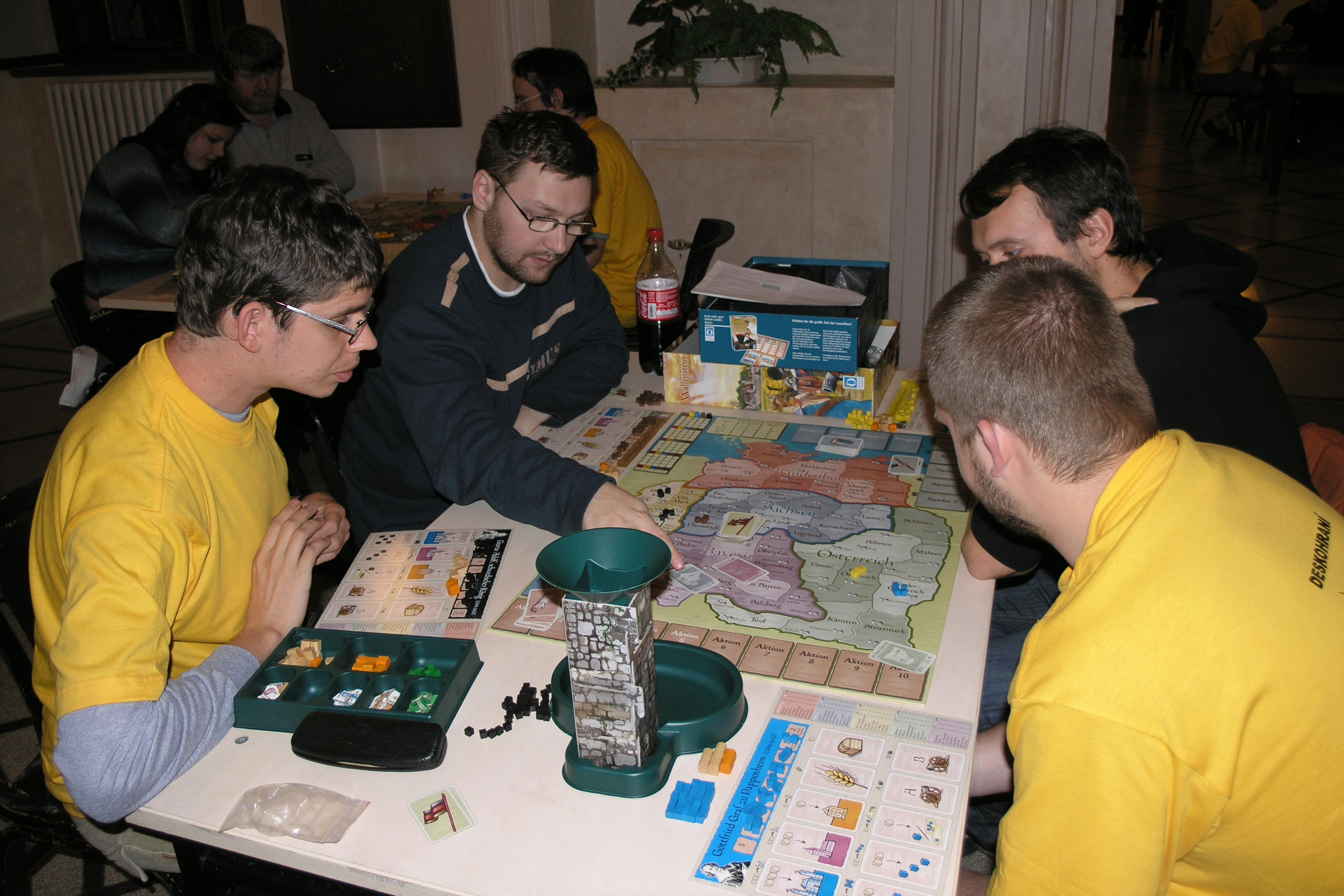
Wallenstein

== Theme ==
=== Historical Context ===
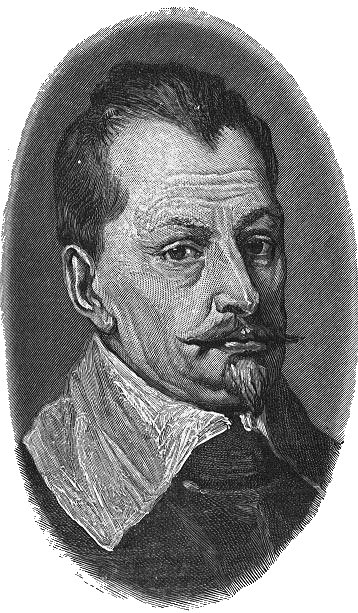
Albrecht von Wallenstein

Wallenstein is named for Albrecht von Wallenstein, the most influential commander of the Imperial Army during the Thirty Years' War (1618–48).

He won a series of victories, gaining the title of Duke of Mecklenburg. His goal was a large central European empire dominating Western Europe. His ambitions led to his dismissal in 1630, but he was reinstated to defend the empire against Swedish attack. He recovered Bohemia, but was defeated by Gustavus Adolphus at Lutzen, and was again dismissed.

Wallenstein's intrigues with the Protestants and his rapidly growing power alarmed the Catholic princes, and he was murdered in his bedroom at Eger by Irish mercenaries.

=== Integration of Theme and Mechanics ===
The game Wallenstein represents two years of the Thirty Years' War. It does not pretend to be a conflict simulation of war. Rather, it is a multiplayer game set in that historical period. Elements from that era intermix with the game mechanics to create an engaging experience.

Wallenstein is represented abstractly in the game by whoever chooses the yellow player. Other important figures of the period are represented by the other colors.

The game board is a map of Germany during the Thirty Years' War. Players must raise grain and gold, feed the masses, stave off rebellions, build churches, trade houses, and palaces, and possibly conquer other provinces. Game play and historical setting mesh to create a compelling gaming experience.

== Gameplay ==
=== Turn Phases ===
The game takes place over the course of two years. Each year is divided into the four seasons: Spring, Summer, Fall, and Winter. During the first three phases, players take actions to build, gather resources, and battle. During the last phase (Winter), players camp and feed their troops and score victory points for buildings. At the end of the second year, players score victory points for buildings again, and the player with the highest total wins.

Therefore, there are six phases in the game where players may take actions. There are 10 actions the players may take during these seasons, the order of which is randomly decided at the beginning of each season. The first five actions are placed on the game board face up, allowing players to plan based on their order. However, the last five actions remain hidden. The first of the hidden actions is revealed after the completion by all players of the first action, and so on until all actions are revealed by the time the fifth action is taken by all players. In this way, the order of the next five actions is always known to the players.

=== Mechanics ===
Turn order is randomly set at the beginning of each season by shuffling then ordering the Leader cards. This order is used throughout the entire season for all actions taken by the players.

At the start of a year, special “season” event cards are randomly chosen from a deck. All players learn the modifiers these cards may have on the game. These four cards are then shuffled and placed face down on the season track. The first three seasons, a card is revealed and its modifiers applied to the game. During the last season (Winter), the modifiers are ignored, but a number on the card reveals the extent of grain shortage for that year. This element allows players a certain level of planning, but an uncertainty of when (or even if) the season event will happen.

Players may only take actions with regions they control, and only one per region. Each player has a player board that shows the available actions. At the beginning of each season, each player secretly plans which action a region will take. Players assign actions to regions by placing the proper region card face down over the appropriate action. Blank region cards allow each player to hide which actions a player has selected to pass on.

==== Actions ====
Build a Palace, Church, or Trading Firm – Choosing this action for a region allows you to build the appropriate building in the region, providing there is a space. A region may not have more than one of the same building. The regions have varying numbers of available building spaces...one to three. Once full, no more building action may be made in the region.

Produce Gold/Grain – Each region produces a set amount of gold and grain. By choosing one of these actions, the region produces that resource. However, this action also causes unrest in the region, represented by a revolt marker placed on the region. If the region is already in unrest (already has one or more revolt markers), a battle must occur to determine if the player still controls the region. A battle triggered by this action involves placing 1 Farmer army for each revolt marker into the cube tower along with any Farmer armies currently in the cup of the tower. A successful revolt will cause the player to lose the region, all buildings will be destroyed, and he receives none of the income from the territory. A revolt marker is always placed in the region, even if one already existed. Pressing the same region over and over results in stronger unrest and increases the chances of a successful revolt.

Supply Army – Creation of new armies. There are three different supply actions such that a player may increase armies in three different regions per season. One of the actions allows an addition of five armies for the cost of three gold. A second allows the addition of three armies for the cost of two gold. The last allows the addition of one army for one gold. This last action additionally allows the player to move as many troops as he wants from one friendly region to an adjacent friendly region. The player may take either or both of these actions.

Movement/Battle – The movement action allows a player to move armies from a country they own into a neighboring country. The player is allowed to move any number of armies they wish, with the exception that they must leave at least one army in the originating country. If the neighboring country does not belong to that player, a battle occurs.

==== Battles ====
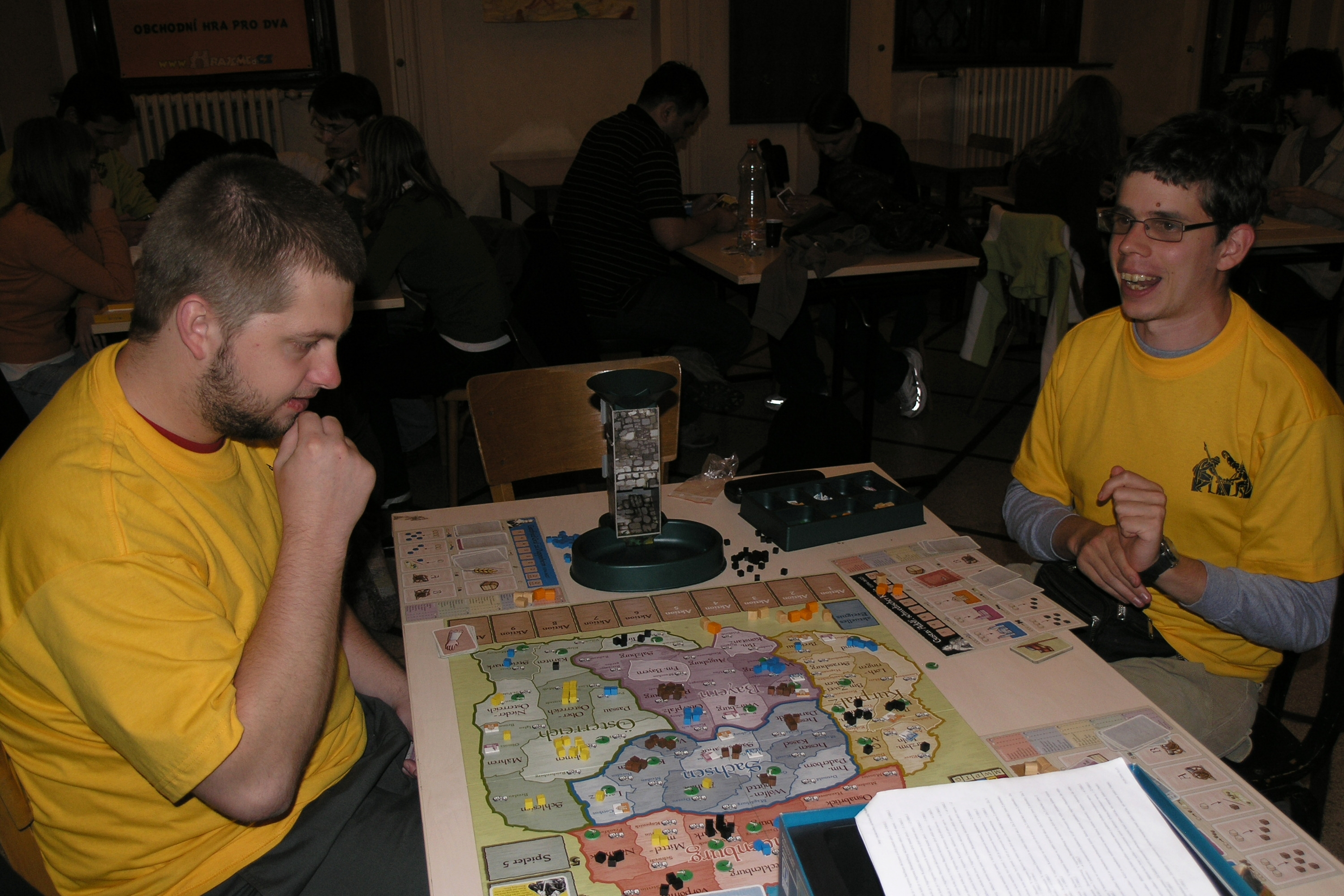
Wallenstein

A battle will take place when a player moves armies into a country belonging to another player, into a neutral country, or when a revolt occurs. All battles are determined by the cube tower. The cube tower is a small, cardboard, tube-like structure. At the beginning of any battle, the two combatants gather their armies (cubes) along with all cubes in the bottom tray of the tower. After all cubes have passed through the tower, the cubes of the two combatants are tallied. Each opponent loses a cube for each enemy cube that makes it through the tower. For example, if four red army cubes and five yellow army cubes ended up in the tray, both players would lose four cubes. The yellow player would win the battle and put the one surviving yellow army cube in the region. The lost army cubes of each combatant are returned to their supply. If one fewer yellow cube had fallen out of the tower, the country would have been devastated, destroying any buildings present and leaving the country uncontrolled by either player.

Due to the vagaries of the cube tower, it can be very difficult to predict the outcome of any battle. Many cubes can be poured into the tower, while only a few may come out. During initial setup, armies from all players are added to the tower as well, so it is also possible that in some battles, more cubes come out than were poured in.

=== Victory Conditions ===
During each Winter phase, players score victory points based on their positions on the board.

For every territory and building owned, a player scores 1 point. Then each colored region is considered as a whole. The player with the most Palaces in a region scores 3 points, the player with most Churches in a region scores 2 points and the player with the most Trading Firms in a region scores 1 point. If there is a tie in any region, the players with the most buildings of a particular type score 1 point fewer. Each colored region is scored in this manner.

e.g. If Jack and Kim are scoring the red region and each of them has 2 Palaces in red territories (provided that no other player has more than 1 Palace in that region), they both score 2 points (3 for the most Palaces, minus 1 for the tie). In this manner, tying another player for the most Trading Firms results in zero points.

At the end of 2 years the player with the most victory points wins the game.

== Strategy ==
=== Elements of Luck ===
One of the largest elements of uncertainty in Wallenstein is the cube tower used to decide the outcome of battles. At the beginning of the game, players put some of their army cubes into the tower and some neutral farmer armies as well. With each battle, army cubes from the two combatants (or possibly neutral 'peasant' cubes) are poured in the top of the tower and a random number of cubes fall out, including some or all of those just put in, and possible some left from previous encounters or the initial load.

This randomness makes for a good amount of luck, without letting it overpower the game. This system, though, tends to make sure that most battles tend to be fought when the attacker has superior numbers and can reasonably count on the tower favoring him with its outcome.

The event cards that play out each season are another small level of randomness. They are known to all players, but the order in which they appear is random each game, leaving players able to plan ahead for possible outcomes, but also forcing them to choose which outcomes to prepare for.

As with most German-style board games, Wallenstein tends to favor player skill and foresight in planning over randomness when deciding the winner for each game.

=== Strategy ===
As a general rule, Wallenstein is more about developing territories rather than conquering them. However, it can certainly be beneficial to take another player's territory after they have already spent resources to develop it. Because of the reliability of receiving victory points from buildings and the uncertainties of battles due to the cube tower, most players tend to avoid conflict in the first year in order to amass larger armies for the second year.

The following more-detailed strategy tips were selected from Innovan's excellent Wallenstein Strategy (V 2004.1.1) document on BoardGameGeek.

- When picking your starting countries look for high wheat or gold production and pass on 2s and 3s. When expanding into neutral countries all the high production countries are usually already taken. Look instead to expand into countries with 3 or 2 cities spaces while being defensible from the other players. Basically you’re looking for a safe place to build palaces and churches without worrying about them being stolen away or devastated in the remainder of the game. These are the countries where you’ll be too busy with building actions to use them for gold or wheat actions.
- Linked countries allow linked actions. The more countries in an area of the map, the more actions you can perform each season in that area. A single country by itself is not survivable. But two otherwise isolated countries side by side are usually survivable because of the greater number of actions they together have in that area.
- Buildings built the first year score victory points both year 1 and year 2. So spending one gold each turn building Trade Firms will net you 9 VPs for cost 6 gold by game end, which is the best return in the game.
- Logistically, particularly because of the “conquered neutral countries get a peasant riot token” rule, it is extremely difficult to get grain and gold from neutral countries taken in year 2. Any expansion for grain and gold countries should happen in year 1. Year 2 expansion into neutral countries should only be about “Where can I build more buildings safely/Steal that Palace from a neighbor and make 5 points?”
- In the three harvesting seasons you can usually gather 12 wheat per year and will lose 3-4 wheat from spoilage in the winter, so you would have to limit yourself to 8-9 countries to completely avoid winter revolts. Certainly expanding to 12 countries is guaranteeing heavy winter revolt losses from over expansion.
- Performing all actions in a season costs 12 gold, yet you’ll usually only raise 6. Your starting gold divided by six turns is how much in deficit you can go each season. On the other hand, ending the game with unspent gold means actions you could have made but didn’t. Starting with 18 gold I aim to raise six gold each turn and spend nine gold in actions each turn.
- Churchpeace is the most likely event of all. A common strategy is to place trade buildings in countries with only one city, but try to place churches and palaces in your 2 and 3 city countries. That way when churchpeace happens it’ll protect not just the church but the palace in that country as well.
- You have 3 ways to buys armies: 5 for 3gold, 3 for 2 gold, and 1 for 1 gold (plus the optional non-combat move). The one army for one gold should be your least used of the three. Instead buy troops in bulk and use your free moveA and moveB on the next turn to move your troops instead.
- Troops in the center of the board have many more movement options than troops on the edge of the board. Try to buy troops in countries in the center.

== Components ==
As included in the 2002 release of Wallenstein by Queen Games.

=== Board ===
- 1 Large game board representing Germany, divided into five regions, each divided into nine smaller territories.
- 5 Individual player boards (one for each player). Each player board shows the player's color, a chart of all the territories and their attributes, and a central area in which to place cards for each of the ten actions.

=== Cards ===
- 45 Land cards representing each different territory.
- 25 Blank land cards.
- 5 Leader cards
- 10 Action cards
- 25 Event cards

=== Pieces ===
- 28 Palace tokens
- 26 Church tokens
- 26 Trading firm tokens
- 42 Revolt markers
- 62 Colored wooden cubes for each player, representing armies
- 20 Green wooden cubes, representing farmers
- 35 Natural-colored wooden chests, representing 1 gold
- 20 Orange wooden chests, representing 5 gold

=== Other ===
- 1 Cube tower
- 1 Plastic sorting container
- 1 Rulebook
- 1 Brief history book

== Variations ==
=== 2-Player Variation ===
A two-player variant created by fans of the game is available at BoardGameGeek.

=== Shogun ===
The game was rethemed as Shogun, released by Queen in multi-language international edition in 2006.

== Awards ==
Games – Best Advanced Strategy Game Runner-Up 2003 International Gamers Award – Best Strategy Game Nominee (special award) 2003

== Availability ==
As of 2005, the Queen Games release of Wallenstein is no longer available. Though this is a German edition, various language translations can be found on BoardGameGeek. Aside from the rules, the game is fairly language independent. Most of the cards contain little or no text, preferring to convey meaning graphically. Being able to pronounce the countries depicted on the board is not essential to gameplay.

Queen Games is also planning to release a multilingual game based on Wallenstein with a new theme. As reported by Gamewire:

It's official - Queen Games will be publishing a game based on the Wallenstein game system to be titled Shogun. The game is designed by Dirk Henn. The game is set in the Sengoku period (approx 1467-1573) which ends with the inception of the well-known Tokugawa Shogunate. The game will be an international edition with language-independent components and a multilingual rules booklet. Here is a small picture of the box cover. The game is to be released in 2006.

Rio Grande Games also lists Wallenstein as a 2006 release. These two releases may or may not be referring to the same game.
