= Classical guitar accessories =

A guitar accessory is a piece of equipment attached to either the guitar or somewhere around the guitar.

== Guitar support ==
A guitar support is an ergonomic alternative to the more commonly used foot-stool. The guitar support lifts the guitar from the player's knee while he or she keeps both feet firmly on the ground. This it is argued improves overall posture by reducing the twisting of the body normally associated with the use of a foot-rest. Flamenco guitarists and acoustic players also benefit from this modern alternative.

=== List of guitar supports ===
- Traditional adjustable guitar footstool
- Dionisio Aguado's tripode.
- Paul Galbraith's endpin.
- Classical Guitar Support
- Arm-n-Track: Made in England? Suction cup based. Wood or plastic models.
- Guitar Efel: Made in Czech Republic. endorsed by Štěpán Rak. Suction cup based. Plastic.
- Gitano: Made in Germany. Suction cup based. Metal. Used by Carlo Marchione, Andrew York, Antigoni Goni, etc.
- Gracie Guitar Stands: Made in USA. Metal guitar stand.
- Neck Up: Made in USA. Suction cup based. Leather.
- Ponticello: Made in Germany. Suction cup based. 3 sizes available.
- Slider Straps: Made in USA. Ergonomic Straps.
- Liikanen's Classical Guitar Knee Support: made in Finland, wood.
- Suction Support: Made in Canada, wood.
- Suction cup style finish in Sapelle Mahogany: Handmade in Australia.
- Tenuto Guitar Support: Made in Canada, rests on the knee and supports the guitar, custom manufactured, with parts available and two styles. Online sales available.

== Armrest ==
Some guitar makers, like Greg Smallman propose an armrest integrated to the guitar. An armrest provides three primary benefits: it lessens damping of the top caused by the right forearm; it is potentially more comfortable for the player; and it absorbs the wear to the finish that would otherwise happen on the top, the binding, and the side. These benefits are of particular importance for ultra-thin-topped instruments, such as Smallman's, but will subtly improve any guitar, including double-tops. The Rasgueo-Rest armrest additionally helps large and tall players avoid hunching-over the Guitar, since the Guitar's surface area is in effect, "expanded" using the arm-rest, giving the arm-height support needed for good playing posture.

=== List of armrests ===
- Saddle-A-Bout Leather Armrest for Guitar is a natural and aesthetic solution for soundboard protection and forearm relief. Made in America.
- Plenosom Armrest, made in Brazil by Tessarin & Bellinati. Wood.
- Cumberland Acoustic Armrest for Guitar
- QT armrest (Qualey-Traudt Armrest), made in Germany.
- Liikanen Classical Guitar Armrest, made in Finland
- John Pearse wood armrests, made in the USA
- Rasgueo-Rest: Ergonomically designed, adjustable Guitar arm rest presenting an elegant solution to discomfort Guitar players experience from resting their arm on the sharp top-edge of Acoustic Guitar. Resonance is promoted, Guitar finish is protected from wear, perspiration damage. Light-weight, Removable

== Capo ==
A capo for a classical - or a flamenco - guitar differs from that used on a steel strung guitar in that it is designed to fit the flat profile of the guitar's neck.

See Capo Shubb

== Slide ==
Porcelain and ceramic slides are better for nylon strings.

See Dunlop Manufacturing and Slide guitar.

== Strap lock ==
A strap lock is a device that prevents the guitar strap from slipping off the strap peg. Several companies make these, and players also improvise various devices that fit over the part of the strap peg that protrudes through the strap end—rubber washers, plastic bag closures, etc.

- Dunlop Ergo Lok
- LOXX Strap Lock

== Guitar Strap ==
A guitar strap connects to the guitar and allows a user to play standing up.

== Nails kits ==
- Miro's Professional Nailcare Kit
- Del Maestro Nail Kit
- Nailkit Royal Classics
- Nail Care Savarez
- The NailScale

== Damper ==
- Damper Pock
- GG Super Mute (Gendai guitar)

== Pickups ==
- DYN-G Schertler
- RMC Pickup Co. (Richard McClish)
- Carlos Juan Acoustic Pickups & Amps, handmade in Germany.
- B-Band pickups and microphones

== Amps ==
Selection of the some classical guitar amplifiers:

- AER Amplifiers Acousticube, Germany.
- Schertler: "David" 80w Acoustic Amp, Switzerland.
- Fishman: Fishman Acoustic Performer Pro / Monitor Pro (Discontinued, produced from 199? to 2003?) testing by Tom Mulhern PDF.
- Carlos Juan Acoustic Pickups & Amps, handmade in Germany.
- Roland AC-60 Acoustic Chorus.

== Bibliography ==
The Guitarist's Guide to Fingernails by Rico Stover. Mel Bay Publications inc. ISBN 0-7866-7395-8
