= Pomegranate (disambiguation) =

A pomegranate is a fruit-bearing shrub or tree.

Pomegranate may also refer to:

== Music ==
- Pomegranates (band), an American indie rock band
- Pomegranate (Astronautalis album), 2008
- Pomegranate (Poi Dog Pondering album), 1995
- Pomegranates (album), a 2015 album by Nicolas Jaar
- Pomegranate, a song by Deadmau5 and the Neptunes

== Other uses ==
- Pomegranate (phone), a fictional mobile phone created on behalf of the Government of Nova Scotia
- The Pomegranate, an academic journal covering the field of Pagan studies
- Pomegranate (publisher), a California-based art book and print publisher
- Pomegranate Supermarket, a supermarket in Brooklyn, New York City
- Pomegranate Press, a vanity press run by Kathryn Leigh Scott
