= Fresco (board game) =

Board game

- Box cover
- Designers: Marco Ruskowski; Marcel Süßelbeck
- Publishers: Queen Games
- Players: 2 to 4
- Playing time: 45 minutes
- Age range: 10 and up

Fresco is a 2010 designer board game by Marco Ruskowski and Marcel Süßelbeck. It was nominated for the 2010 Spiel des Jahres award and won the 2010 Deutscher Spiele Preis. Each player in Fresco takes the role of master painter attempting to restore the fresco on a cathedral ceiling, earning points for each section they repair. Players must manage a team of apprentices who will buy or mix the required paints, paint portraits to earn money, and keep the bishop happy. Overworked apprentices may leave the painter's service, reducing the actions the player can take. A player can improve morale, and even gain extra actions, by letting his workers sleep late. However, this can allow earlier players to block his ability to buy necessary paints or to restore a section of the fresco before he can get to it.

During each turn in Fresco, players secretly assign their five apprentices to any of several locations. Choices are then revealed and each location is visited in turn. At the market apprentices can buy paint in the primary colors. At the cathedral they can restore a fresco using specified colors to score points and gain income for future turns. In the studio they can paint portraits for the bourgeois to earn money. At the workshop they mix the purchased paints into more valuable secondary colors. Or apprentices can be given a night off at the theater to improve morale. Play continues until most or all of the fresco is restored, whereupon the points are totaled and the painter who has impressed to bishop most greatly is the winner.

Fresco can be played with the standard game only or with any of eleven "expansion modules." Modules 1-3 were included in the original publication of Fresco. Queen published a boxed expansion featuring Modules 4-6 in 2010 and a second expansion containing Modules 8-10 in 2013. The Modules include:

- In the original box:
  - Module 1: The Portraits. Gives the player various random rewards for painting portraits in the studio.
  - Module 2: The Bishop's Request: Gives additional point and paint rewards if players forfeit some of their income from the restored fresco to meet specific requests.
  - Module 3: Special Blend Colors: Makes available additional paint colors (brown and pink) that must be mixed and can provide higher points if used to restore the cathedral.
- First expansion (2010):
  - Module 4: The Wishing Well: Gives early players in the market each turn an opportunity to get a small random bonus.
  - Module 5: The Leaf Gold: Painters can acquire gold leaf. If they use this to gild paint of a particular, randomly determined, color, they earn additional points.
  - Module 6: The Glaziers: Painters may acquire pieces of stained glass in various colors at the glaziery! A new location. When they restore a segment of the fresco near a cathedral window, they must also supply glass in specified colors for additional points. But if they fail, their point reward for restoring the fresco is reduced.
- 2010 Essen Spiel module:
  - Module 7: The Scrolls: Players can get substantial extra points for restoring fresco sections in a particular row or column. A small addition made available at Essen, Queen Games later published this as a standalone expansion.
- 2011 Essen Spiel module:
  - The Bishop's Favor (unnumbered "mini-expansion"): An additional random small reward is given to a painter for each fresco segment he restores under the bishop's supervision. Created for the 2011 Essen Spiel, this mini-expansion was later made available to purchase online.
- Second expansion (2013):
  - Module 8: The Bells: The painters may contribute to the restoration of the cathedral bells for additional points. However, if they cannot afford the full cost they cannot earn income until they fulfill their pledge.
  - Module 9: The Wall Fresco: Adds an additional small fresco to be restored. The sections of the wall fresco require only one paint to restore, but their rewards are smaller.
  - Module 10: The Medico: An illness is spreading among the apprentices, reducing their ability to work, but a visiting medicine seller has the cure.

In 2014 Queen Games published the Fresco Big Box, a single large package containing the base game and all eleven expansion modules.
