= Carat (board game) =

- Publishers: Queen Games
- Publication: 1993
- Genres: Board game
- Players: 2–4
- Chance: Low
- Skills: Strategy; Adaptability

Carat is an abstract tile laying German style board game designed by Dirk Henn and published in 1993 by Queen Games and db Spiele. In 2004, after the success of Alhambra, Queen Games released an updated version of the game with an Arabian theme called Die Gärten der Alhambra.

== Gameplay ==
The game board consists of regular octagons and squares, tiled such that each square is surrounded by four octagons. Players first take turns to place square tiles on the squares to set up the game. They then place octagonal tiles around the squares. Each square tile is worth a number of victory points, and each octagonal tile contains a number of each player's influence markers. When a square tile is surrounded by octagonal tiles, each player totals the number of influence markers around that tile. The player with the highest unique number of influence markers scores the victory points for that square tile - so if two players tie for first place, the third player will win the victory points. When all tiles are placed, the player with the most victory points is the winner.
