= Granada High School =

Granada High School may refer to:

- Granada High School (California), Livermore, California
- Granada Hills Charter High School, Granada Hills, California
- Granada High School (Granada, Colorado)

== See also ==
- Grenada High School in Grenada, Mississippi
