= Grenadine (disambiguation) =

Grenadine is a non-alcoholic red syrup.

Grenadine may also refer to:

- Grenadine (cloth), a light silk weave
- Grenadine (band), American band comprising members of Tsunami, Unrest, and Eggs
- Grenadine Records, a record label
- Grenadine Airways
- Grenadines, a group of islands

== See also ==
- Saint Vincent and the Grenadines, a nation
- Granadaene, an organic chemical
