= Pomegranate Supermarket =

Pomegranate
- Interactive map of Pomegranate

Restaurant information
- Established: August 19, 2008; 18 years ago
- Owner: Abraham Banda
- Location: 1507 Coney Island Ave, Brooklyn, New York, 11230, United States
- Coordinates: 40.6207°N 73.964°W
- Website: thepompeopleonline.com

Pomegranate is a kosher supermarket on Coney Island Avenue in Brooklyn, New York City, United States.

== Background ==
It opened on August 19, 2008, after two years of construction, on the site of a former bakery, auto repair shop, and another store. It is 18,000 square feet and a block long. It has three on-site kitchens, as well as a fourth down the street, from which they produce 3,00 cooked foods every week. The owner is Abraham Banda, a Satmar Hasidic Jew from Williamsburg, Brooklyn, who also owns a grocery store in Long Island. The marketing director is Sam Ash.

It focuses on gourmet delicacies and organic produce. They sell luxury products as well as traditional Jewish cuisine like challah and gefilte fish. It has a 50-car parking lot with valet parking. It has full-time rabbinical supervision.

During Israeli Prime Minister Benjamin Netanyahu's September 2019 visit to the United States for the United Nations General Assembly, his staff ordered $1,800 worth of food for him, including both prime rib and other meat as well as traditional Shabbat food like challah, chulent, gefilte fish, and noodle kugel. Other notable shoppers have included Ivanka Trump and Itzhak Perlman.

David Brooks praised Pomegranate in The New York Times, writing that "Pomegranate looks like any island of upscale consumerism, but deep down it is based on a countercultural understanding of how life should work." The New York Post called the store the "kosher Whole Foods".
