= Alhambra (board game) =

2003 board game

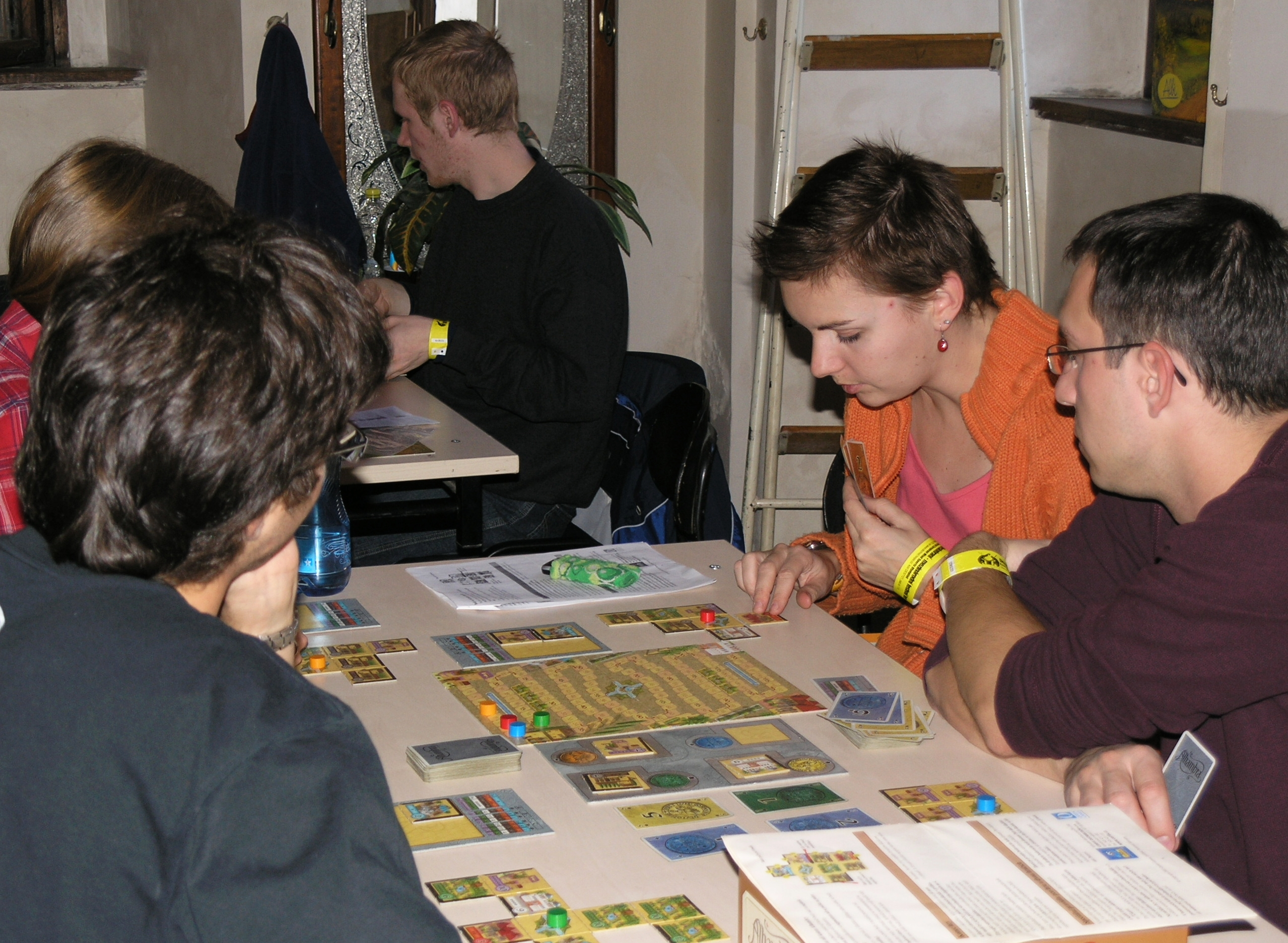
- Players trade currencies and place tiles to build an Arabian palace.
- Designers: Dirk Henn
- Publishers: Queen Games; Überplay
- Players: 2–6
- Playing time: 60 minutes
- Chance: Medium
- Age range: 8 Years Up
- Skills: Currency trading

Alhambra (German: Der Palast von Alhambra, literally "The Palace of Alhambra") is a 2003 tile-based German-style board game designed by Dirk Henn. It was originally published in Germany by Queen Games in a language-interdependent version; an English-specific version was released in North America by the now-defunct Überplay. The game is an update, set during the construction of the Alhambra palace in 14th century Granada, of the 1998 stock trading board game Stimmt So!, which in turn was an update of the 1992 mafia influence board game Al Capone; the original version was subsequently released as Alhambra: The Card Game. Upon its release, Alhambra won numerous awards, including the Spiel des Jahres award. Its success has led to the release of numerous expansion packs and spin-off games, and is becoming Queen Games' flagship franchise.

== Gameplay ==
The game consists of a deck of "currency cards" of various values in four currencies (suits) and a bag of "building tiles" of various prices, as well as a number of boards (a currency market, a building market, a reserve board for each player and a scoring track). Six of the building tiles are "fountain" tiles; one is given to each player to form the starting point of their palace, or "Alhambra", and the rest of the building tiles are placed in the bag. Each player is then dealt currency cards until the total value of cards in their hand is greater than or equal to twenty. The remaining currency cards are distributed into five piles, and two special scoring cards are inserted into the second and fourth piles. The five piles are then placed in order to form the currency deck. Four currency cards are drawn and placed face up to form the currency market, and four building tiles are drawn and placed face up on the four spaces of the building market. The player with the fewest currency cards in their hand takes the first turn; if tied, the tied player with the lower total value of currency cards in their hand takes the first turn.

Players then take turns, during which they may perform one of the following actions:

- Draw currency cards from the currency market – either one card of any value or multiple cards totaling five or less.
- Buy building tiles from the building market – by discarding currency cards totaling the value of the tile or greater. Each space on the building market has a currency type next to it; all cards discarded must be of that currency type, as each builder wants to be paid in their own currency. If the value of cards discarded exactly equals the price of the tile, the player may take another action during the turn.
- Redesign their Alhambra – move a building tile from their reserve board to their Alhambra or from their Alhambra to their reserve board, or swap one tile from their reserve board with one already in their Alhambra.

At the end of a player's turn, they must add the tiles they purchased this turn to their Alhambra or place them on their reserve board (however, if they purchased multiple tiles on their turn, they do not have to add them in the order they were purchased). Currency cards and Building tiles are then added to any spaces in the Currency market or the Building market.

Some tiles have walls along one or more edges. When players add tiles to their Alhambra, it must be possible to "walk" from the new tile to their starting fountain, i.e. it must be possible to trace a path from the fountain to the new tile while remaining within tiles and without crossing through any walls. It is also not permitted to create "holes" such that all four sides of a gap are closed in.

When the scoring cards are drawn from the Currency deck, or when not enough tiles are left in the bag to completely refill the building market, scoring occurs. The player with the most of a given building card type scores points indicated on the scoring card, according to the building type; in case of a tie, points are divided equally among tying players. More common building types are worth more points, and building types are worth more points in later scoring rounds. Each player also scores one point for each wall segment in their longest wall. In the final scoring round, the player with the most of a given currency type takes the tile of that currency type and may add it to their Alhambra before scoring.

The game contains special rules for two-player games. Two-player games use an imaginary third player called Dirk. Dirk does not use money, he is given a set of buildings automatically. During each scoring, Dirk's buildings are scored like the players', but he gets no points for walls.

== Expansions ==
Due to the original game's popularity, as of 2013, six expansion packs, termed "extensions," have been designed for Alhambra, each of which adds four "modules" to the game. These modules may be played together or separately and modules may be combined from different expansions. The extensions are designed by both Dirk Henn and Wolfgang Panning and are named for one of its modules. These are, in order of release:

1. The Vizier's Favor (Die Gunst des Wesirs, 2004)
  - Winning the Vizier's Favor introduces a vizier for each player. A player may use their vizier to buy a building tile out of turn provided they can pay exact change for it. A player may bring their vizier back into play by skipping their action on their turn.
  - The Bureau de Change introduces special cards to the deck. These special cards allow players to mix currencies when buying tiles.
  - The Bonus Cards introduces cards which are given out to each player at the start of the game. The cards grant its player a bonus if they possess the tile on the card in their Alhambra.
  - The Worker's Hut introduces worker hut tiles. Worker hut tiles are free to take but count as a player's action. They score nothing if they are placed by themselves, but if adjacent to other tiles of the same colour, they count as 1 extra building of that colour for each they are adjacent to.
2. The City Gates (Die Tore der Stadt, 2004)
  - The City Gates introduces six city gates and six city gate cards to the deck. A player may during their turn pick up a city gate card, which allows them to, at a later point in time, place a city gate. City gates, which are placed on walls, allow buildings to be separated by walls while still being accessible – as if the wall did not exist.
  - The Diamonds introduces a new currency into the game: diamonds. Diamonds may be used in place of any currency when buying tiles but may not be combined with other currencies when doing so.
  - The Camps introduces eight camp tiles, which are bought as with other buildings. However, camps must be separated from the city by a wall, and may not be adjacent to each other if there is a wall in the way. Camps score points for every building tile in the direction of its walls.
  - The Characters adds ten character cards representing persons. These character cards are shuffled into the currency deck and, once drawn, are immediately auctioned off to the highest bidder and grant players special privileges or abilities.
3. The Thief's Turn (Die Stunde der Diebe, 2005)
  - The City Walls adds eight city wall cards to the deck, which allows the player to add wall segments to tiles without them. Walls added in this manner, however, cannot be removed for the remainder of the game, and may not have city gates built on them.
  - The Thieves adds 12 thief cards, which are given to the players at the start of the game. A player may play a thief card between turns (except before their own turn) and take a currency card matching the type of thief card played.
  - The Change adds coins to the game. Whenever a player overpays for a building, half of the difference is refunded in coins of random currencies. Coins are worth one unit of their particular currency, and may be used with cards to buy buildings.
  - The Street Trader adds traders and circular trader tiles. Trader tiles are given to each player at the start of the game, and are placed adjacent to any tile. If a player builds in the location of the trader tile, they may place a trader of a matching colour from the trader tile to the building (or exchange a trader for one of another color), and the trader tile is moved. There are three traders on the trader tile at any given time. Points are awarded based on the number of traders in building tiles.
4. The Treasure Chamber (Die Schatzkammer des Kalifen, literally "The Caliphs' Treasury," 2006)
  - The Treasure Chamber adds treasure chests to the game. There are three treasure chambers, each containing four chests. At any point in the game players may buy the chests in one chamber, and place the chests on buildings in their Alhambra matching the colour of the chests. Players gain additional points for the number of chests in their Alhambra.
  - The Master Builders adds Master Builder cards, which are given to players at the start of the game. Master Builder cards may be used either as currency or may be discarded to move a building tile.
  - The Invaders adds invasion cards and scout cards to the game. Whenever scoring occurs, an invasion card is drawn. Players lose points for each building tile on the edge of their Alhambra without a wall in the direction specified by the invasion card. Scout cards may be used to look into the next invasion card, and may be taken whenever a building of the same type is bought.
  - The Bazaars adds bazaar tiles to the game. Bazaars, when drawn, are placed next to the building market, and may be bought (with exact change only) for the same price as the building of the corresponding currency type being sold. Bazaars score only in the final round of play, and score a point for each adjacent or diagonal building matching the colours on the bazaar.
5. The Power of Sultan (Die Macht des Sultans, 2008)
  - The Caravanserai adds special Caravanserai cards to the game. Each player may buy up to two Caravanserai (which cost less if their Alhambra is more diverse). Caravanserai cards provide income to the player, and appreciates in value the longer they are unused.
  - The Art of the Moorish adds culture counters to the game. Culture counters are obtained when a player builds at least two buildings of the same cost. During a player's turn, a player may choose to develop culture, in addition to the existing actions. Victory points are awarded during normal scoring based on the number of times that culture was developed as well as the number of buildings of the same cost that has been built.
  - The new Score Cards changes the relative score values of the six basic types of buildings in each of the three scoring phases.
  - The Power of Sultan adds Sultan cards to the game. Sultan cards may be bought as with any other building. Once bought, a special die is rolled, and the building type corresponding to the rolled value (or the building type opposite to this value) is marked. When a new building is drawn, players who have marked the particular type of building may use the Sultan card to immediately claim the tile and use it.
6. The Falconers (Die Falkner, 2013)
  - The Falconers: players can now purchase and place falcons on intersections of four buildings in their Alhambra. The magnificent birds of prey will certainly delight their owners – with victory points.
  - The Portals: portals offer players new ways to build their walls and gain even more victory points for them, especially if they are part of their longest contiguous wall.
  - The Building Sites: allows players to purchase and place buildings for half price. Its walls are completed instantly but the building itself will only score once it's finished.
  - The Exchange Certificates: if a player overpays for a purchase he gains a voucher for the amount he overpaid in a currency of his choice.

=== Promotional expansion ===
The promotional expansion/module "The Magic Buildings" was also released. It adds 6 magic building tiles to the game. When drawn, these tiles can be placed to score extra points depending on their surrounding tiles. The promotional expansion/module "The Medina Buildings" adds 9 Medina building tiles to the game. During the scoring rounds, they award "negative" points to the player with the fewest of these tiles in his/her Alhambra.

== Spin-offs ==
The success of Alhambra has also led Henn to release or re-release some other games under the Alhambra name and Moorish theme:

- The Gardens of the Alhambra (Die Gärten der Alhambra, 2004) is an updated version of the tile-laying board game Carat, originally released in a more abstract form by db Spiele in 1993.
- Troisdorf (2005) is a limited, re-themed edition of Alhambra, with identical rules, set in and only sold in Troisdorf, the town in which Queen Games is based.
- Alhambra: The Dice Game (Alhambra: Das Würfelspiel, 2006) is a die-rolling game, broadly similar in play to Yahtzee.

== Video game ==
Early development version of the video game for Xbox Live Arcade

A video game version was being developed by Vivendi Games for the Xbox 360 via Xbox Live Arcade, but was cancelled due to "unforeseen difficulties".

== Reception ==
Upon its release, Alhambra won the Spiel des Jahres the Schweizer Spielepreis for Family Games, the As d'Or, and the Essen Feather for the year of its release, It also placed second in the Deutscher Spiele Preis. The game was also reviewed by Pyramid, with the reviewer praising its components and describing it as a "simple-themed tile-laying and resource management game".
