= Queen Games =

German board game publisher

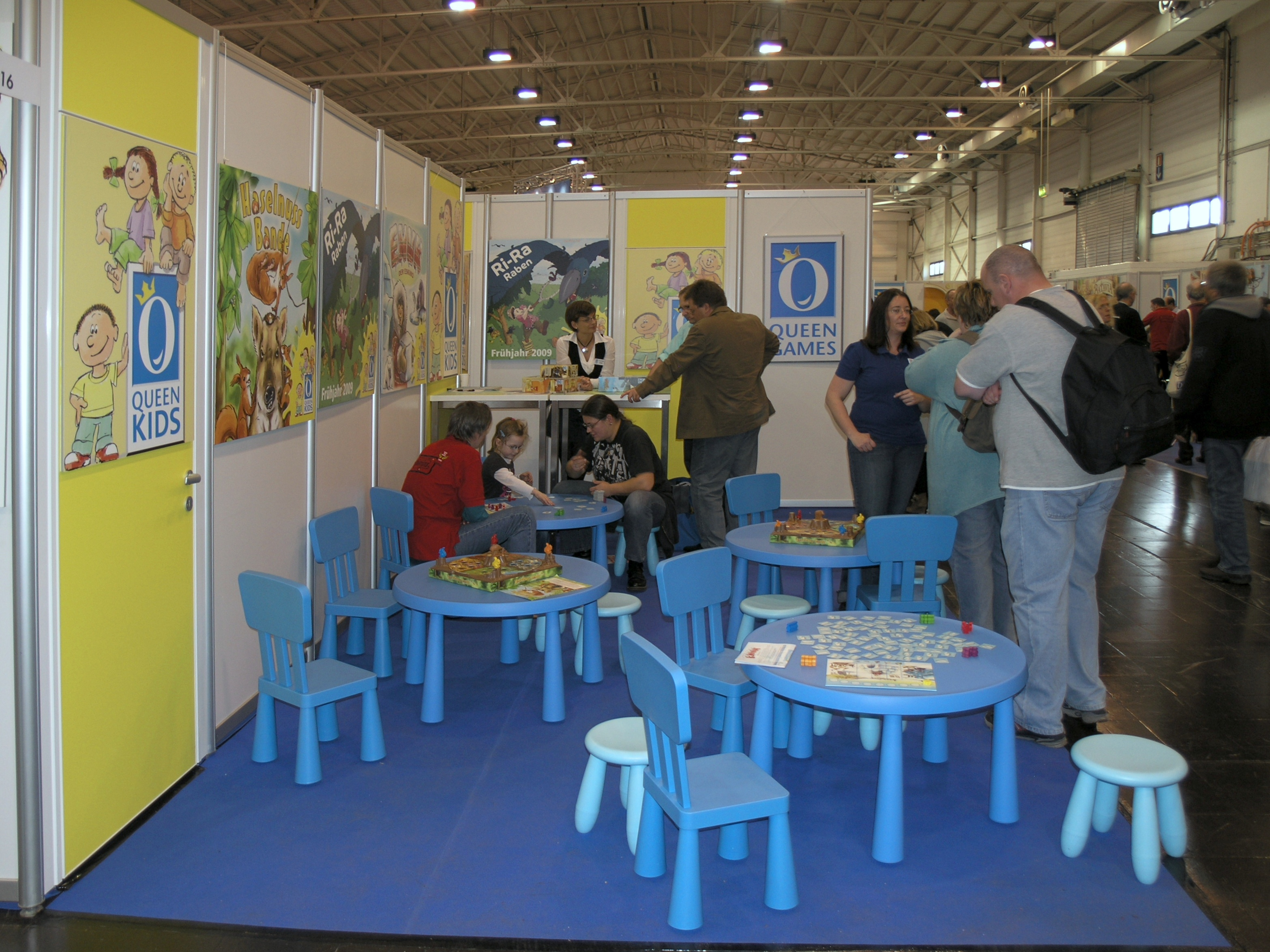
Queen Kids display at Essen Spiel 2008

Queen Games is a German publisher of tabletop games, based in Troisdorf and founded in 1992 by head Rajive Gupta, which specialises primarily in German-style, family-level games but has also published smaller numbers of both simpler, children's games and more complex, gamers' games.

They have shown a propensity for re-releasing previously self-published games in professionally illustrated editions, having drawn multiple times from the catalogues of db-Spiele and, more recently, Winsome Games, and re-releasing those already published by themselves with a different theme and varying degrees of revision of the rules. One of their more popular releases is Alhambra, itself developed from a game originally self-published in 1992, which won the Spiel des Jahres and placed second in the Deutscher Spiele Preis in 2003. Alhambra has since spawned many expansions and a number of standalone spin-offs and could be considered the "franchise" of the company. They are also known to some extent for publishing many games designed by Dirk Henn (and not only, though primarily, those previously self-published by him), with illustration by Jo Hartwig or Michael Menzel and/or with an Arabian theme, whether set within the Arabian Peninsula itself or an Islamic culture such as Al-Andalus. Other games published by Queen Games include Industria: 600 Years of Progress, San Francisco Cable Car and Wallenstein.

In 2000, Queen Games switched from publishing their games in traditionally horizontal, shallow, rectangularly faced boxes in various shapes and sizes to using distinctively "fatter" boxes designed for being stacked vertically in only four standardised box sizes and their publications from about 2005 to 2010 have typically been produced in both a domestic version with only German rules and an export version (recognisable by the flags indicating the included languages on the front of the box) with rules in English, French, Spanish, Italian, Dutch and German and the title on the box changed to be more language-independent (such as Alhambra instead of Der Palast von Alhambra). If the game components contain text this is replaced in the export version with either language-independent symbols (as has been the case with Alhambra and Roma) or a translation into English (as is the case with more recent releases such as Granada and Arena: Roma II). Some of their games have, however, also been re-published by publishers based in other countries in fully translated versions (these include, in the case of English-language versions, Überplay and Esdevium Games; Queen's own export versions are, as of February 2010, distributed in the United States by Rio Grande Games and in the United Kingdom by Esdevium Games). Both practices appear to be being gradually phased out as of February 2010, with most new games being packaged in shallower, square-fronted boxes and produced in one German-titled, multilingual edition; only those that are language-dependent have separate domestic and export editions.

== Notable publications ==
Listed below are games published at some point by Queen Games that have been recommended by international awards or considered notable enough to be re-released by Queen or other publishers.

| Export name | German name | Translated name | Release | Designer | Notes |
|---|---|---|---|---|---|
| – | Expedition | – | 1996 | Ursula and Wolfgang Kramer | Previously published as Wildlife Adventure (Abenteuer Tierwelt) in 1985 by Ravensburger; recommended for the 1997 Spiel des Jahres, 8th place in the 1997 Deutscher Spiele Preis, winner of the 1996 Meeples' Choice Award |
| – | Res publica | Res publica | 1998 | Reiner Knizia | Previously published in 1991 by Hexagames; published in English in 1999 by Avalanche Press and in 2011/2012 by Queen Games |
| – | Schnäppchen Jagd | Bargain Hunt | 1998 | Uwe Rosenberg | Published in English as Bargain Hunter in November 2010 by Valley Games |
| – | Die Händler | The Traders | 1999 | Wolfgang Kramer and Richard Ulrich | Recommended for the 1999 Spiel des Jahres, 5th place in the 1999 Deutscher Spiele Preis; published in English as Merchants of the Middle Ages in 2010 by Z-Man Games |
| – | Don | – | 2001 | Michael Schacht | Republished as Serengeti in 2006 by Asmodée Éditions and in English as Serengeti in 2007 by ABACUSSPIELE |
| Industria: 600 Years of Progress | Industria – 600 Jahre Entwicklung | – | 2003 | Michael Schacht | A different box was produced for each individual language but components remained in German; finalist for the 2004 International Gamers Award in the general strategy games, multiplayer category; republished as Industry in 2010 by Ystari Games |
| Alhambra | Der Palast von Alhambra | The Palace of Alhambra | 2003-03 | Dirk Henn | Previously implemented as Al Capone in 1992 by db-Spiele and as Stimmt so! in 1998 by Queen Games; winner of the 2003 Spiel des Jahres, winner of the 2003 Essen Feather, 2nd place in the 2003 Deutscher Spiele Preis, winner of the 2003 As d'Or, winner of the 2005 game of the year award in Finland, Sweden and Norway; published in English in 2004 by Überplay and in 2009 by Esdevium Games, republished as Alhambra: Anniversary Edition (Der Palast von Alhambra – Jubiläumsedition) in 2008 and as New York in 2010, reimplemented as Granada in 2009 |
| The Gardens of the Alhambra | Die Gärten der Alhambra | – | 2004–10 | Dirk Henn | Previously published as Carat in 1993 by db-Spiele and as Carat in 1998 by Queen Games; recommended for the 2005 Spiel des Jahres |
| Architekton | Architekton | | 2005-04 | Michael Schacht | Previously published as Contra in 2001 by Spiele aus Timbuktu |
| Tombouctou | Timbuktu | Timbuktu | 2005–10 | Dirk Henn | Previously published as Timbuktu in 1993 by db-Spiele; recommended for the 2006 Spiel des Jahres |
| Shogun | Shogun | – | 2006–10 | Dirk Henn | Previously implemented as Wallenstein in 2002 by Queen Games; finalist for the 2003 International Gamers Award in the general strategy games, multiplayer category |
| Thebes | Jenseits von Theben | Beyond Thebes | 2007-03 | Peter Prinz | Previously published as Jenseits von Theben in 2004 by Prinz Spiele; nominated for the 2007 Spiel des Jahres |
| Eketorp | Eketorp – Die Wikingerburg | Eketorp: The Viking Stronghold | 2007–10 | Dirk Henn | Previously published as Eketorp in 2003 by db-Spiele |
| The Thief of Baghdad | Der Dieb von Bagdad | – | 2006–10 | Thorsten Gimmler | Nominated for the 2007 Spiel des Jahres |
| Chicago Express | Chicago Express | – | 2008–10 | Harry Wu | Previously published as Wabash Cannonball in 2007 by Winsome Games |
| Sultan | Sultan | – | 2009-09 | André Zatz and Sérgio Halaban | Previously published as Riquezas do Sultão in 2007 by Estrela |
| Granada | Granada | – | 2009–10 | Dirk Henn | Previously implemented as Alhambra |
| Arena: Roma II | Arena – Revolte in Rom II | Arena: Revolt in Rome II | 2009–10 | Stefan Feld | Sequel to Roma (Revolte in Rom), published in 2005 by Queen Games, sharing the same system but having different cards; both have the components to be played as a standalone games but may be combined with one another |
| San Francisco Cable Car | San Francisco Cable Car | – | 2009–10 | Dirk Henn | Previously published as Iron Horse in 1997 by db-Spiele and as Metro in 2000 by Queen Games; recommended for the 2000 Spiel des Jahres, winner of the 2001 Mensa Select award, finalist for the 2001 International Gamers Award in the general strategy games, multiplayer category |
| Fresco | Fresko | – | 2010-03 | Marco Ruskowski and Marcel Süßelbeck | Winner of the 2010 Deutscher Spiele Preis, nominated for the 2010 Spiel des Jahres |
| Samarkand: Routes to Riches | Samarkand – Karawane zum Reichtum | Samarkand: Caravan to Riches | 2010-03 | David V. H. Peters and Harry Wu | Previously implemented as Age of Scheme: Routes to Riches in 2008 by Winsome Games; recommended for the 2010 Spiel des Jahres |
| Showmanager | – | – | 2010-09 | Dirk Henn | Previously published as Premiere in 1992 by db-Spiele, as Showmanager in 1997 by Queen Games and as Atlantic Star in 2002 by Queen Games; recommended for the 1997 Spiel des Jahres, recommended for the 2002 Spiel des Jahres, 3rd place in the 1997 Deutscher Spiele Preis, winner of the 1997 Meeples' Choice Award |
| Paris Connection | – | – | 2011-01 | David V. H. Peters | Previously published as SNCF in 2010 by Winsome Games |
| German Railways | – | – | 2011/2012 | Harry Wu | Previously implemented as Preußische Ostbahn in 2008 by Winsome Games |
| Dschunke | – | Junk | 2011/2012 | Michael Schacht | Previously published in 2002 by Queen Games; recommended for the 2002 Spiel des Jahres, 3rd place in the 2002 Deutscher Spiele Preis, finalist for the 2003 International Gamers Award in the general strategy games, multiplayer category |
| Escape: The Curse of the Temple | Escape: Der Fluch des Tempels | – | 2012 | Kristian Amundsen Østby | 2012 Meeples' Choice Nominee, 2013 Origins Awards Best Family, Party or Children's Game Nominee, 2013 Spiel des Jahres Game of the Year Recommended, 2013 UK Games Expo Best Boardgame Nominee. |

== See also ==
- List of game manufacturers
