= Victor Bedikian =

French guitar maker

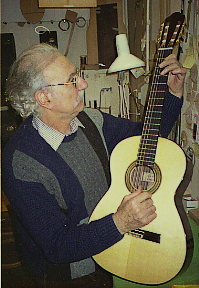
Victor Bedikian with one of his guitars

Victor Bedikian is a French guitar maker.

Bedikian worked with Robert Bouchet to learn the style of Antonio de Torres, a Spanish guitar maker from the 19th century. Bedikian created his first guitar by 1965 and opened a workshop in Paris in 1977, where Bouchet would often visit. Bedikian is now retired.
