= Granadilla, Spain =

Spanish medieval walled town forcibly abandoned in the 1960s

Coordinates: 40°16′5.5″N 6°6′23.4″W

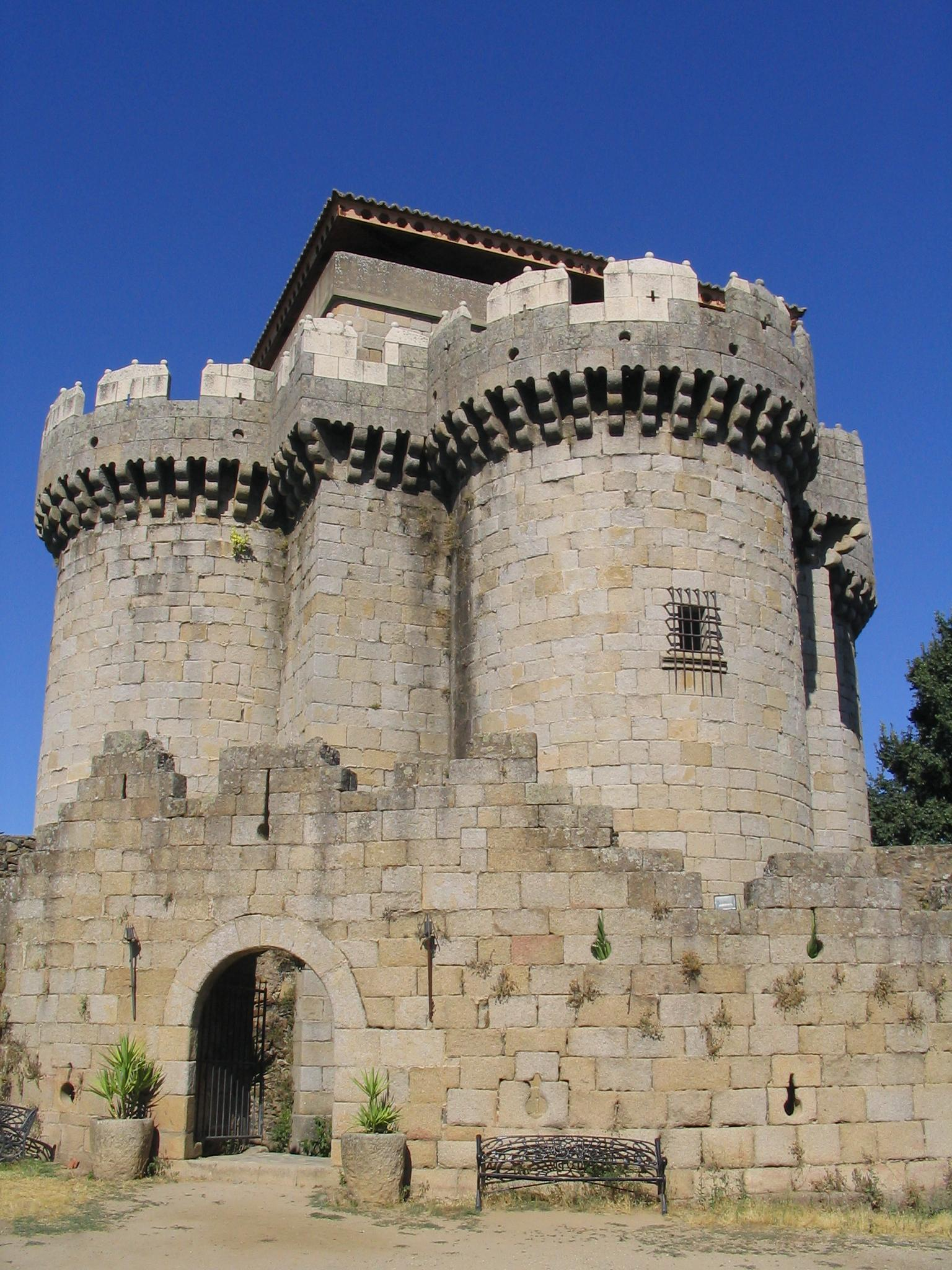
Granadilla's castle

Granadilla is a ghost town in Spain. It is located in Extremadura. Since 1960, it has belonged to Zarza de Granadilla's municipality. On 24 June 1955, during the Franco regime, its residents had to leave when the Council of Ministers ordered a reservoir to be built nearby. Currently, the area is a summer campsite for young people and tourists.
