= Greg Smallman =

Australian luthier (born 1947)

Greg Smallman (born 19 June 1947 in Cronulla, Australia) is the first internationally successful non-traditional Australian guitar-maker. He is known worldwide for his innovative guitar designs Although his guitars are in outward appearance similar to a traditional Spanish classical guitar, there are numerous innovative differences.

== Description ==
Among the differences from the classical Spanish guitar is the use of a high, arched and carved back, which is considerably thicker and heavier than for a conventional guitar. The back is made of Madagascar rosewood, while the top is always made of western red cedar. The light weight of the top combined with Smallman's unique system of bracing makes the guitar very responsive to input with a full rounded sound (not thin). The top of Smallman guitars is braced using a "lattice" framework composed of balsa wood and carbon fibre. By contrast, traditional classical guitars use struts made of cedar or spruce arranged in a "fan" shape.

The world-renowned classical guitarists John Williams, Miloš Karadaglić, Xuefei Yang and many others use Greg Smallman guitars.

In 1999 the Greg Smallman label changed to Greg Smallman & Sons Damon & Kym. Based for many years in Glen Innes, New South Wales, in 2002 the Smallmans briefly relocated to the Mornington Peninsula outside Melbourne. The Greg Smallman and Sons workshop is now located near Esperance, Western Australia. They did not have a website till 2012.

Greg Smallman is often admired for openly sharing his knowledge. Many luthiers worldwide have incorporated Smallman's innovations into their own guitars.

== Quotes ==
"The Australian luthier, Greg Smallman has been responsible for a minor revolution in guitar design, bringing some subtle but important changes to the classical instrument that have had a more profound effect than those contributed by any other modern maker."

— Tony Bacon

"What I find interesting and wonderful about Greg's approach, is that he starts from admiring the traditional - not knocking it, but wanting to know if it's possible to improve it in some way. He has quite clearly done that for me. Basically, he is making the guitar a more musical instrument."

— John Williams in 1993

"Smallman's significance to the development of the classical guitar worldwide places him on an evolutionary chart as successor to the heritage established by Torres and Fleta."

— Ron K. Payne

"I feel that the loudness of Greg's guitars is a by-product of their musical qualities rather than an end in itself"

— John Williams

== Gallery ==
John Williams playing a Smallman guitar in 2005

Smallman rosette

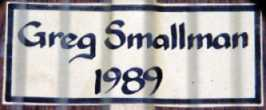
Smallman label as used until 2002

== See also ==
- Classical guitar making
