= Granada Cinema =

Granada Cinema may refer to the following establishments in England:

- Granada Cinema, Chichester
- Granada Cinema, Harrow
- Granada Cinema, Tooting
- Granada Cinema, Woolwich

== See also ==
- Granada plc
