= Dirk Henn =

German-style board game designer (born 1960)

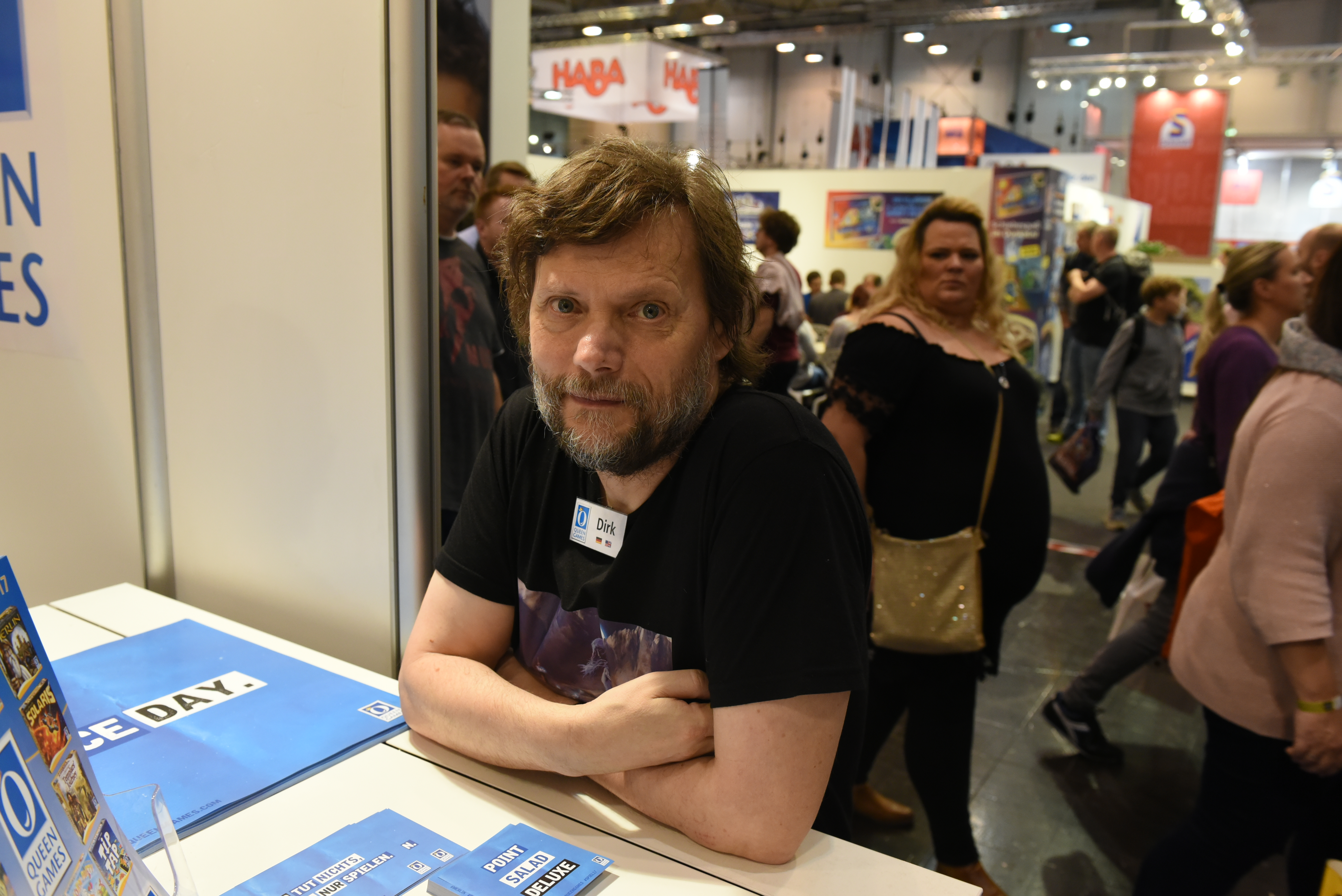
Henn 2017 at the Spiel game convention in Essen, Germany

Dirk Henn (born 1960) is a German-style board game designer who was born in Bendorf, Germany.

Dirk Henn is best known for his game Alhambra, which won the Spiel des Jahres and placed 2nd in the Deutscher Spiele Preis in 2003.

== Career ==
Henn began his game‑design career in 1992 by self‑publishing Al Capone, which he later redesigned into the stock‑collecting game Stimmt so! (1998).

Henn designed the theater management game Show Manager (1996) by Queen Games, which was later rethemed to focus on ocean cruises for Atlantic Star (2001). Atlantic Star was recommended for the 2002 Spiel des Jahres Awards.

Henn designed the train board game Metro (1997). Metro was recommended for the 2000 Spiel des Jahres Awards.

Henn designed the board game Alhambra (2003) to blend set collection with worker placement as a central mechanic. For Alhambra, Henn reworked the same design that he previously used for Al Capone and Stimmt so!. Henn won the 2003 Spiel des Jahres for Alhambra.

Henn's The Gardens of the Alhambra was recommended for the 2005 Spiel des Jahres Awards. Henn's Timbuktu was recommended for the 2006 Spiel des Jahres Awards.

Henn designed the board game Shogun (2006), which Alex Meehan of Dicebreaker called "one of the best board games of the modern era".

Henn rethemed his previous Stimmt so! as Alhambra: The Card Game (2010).

Henn designed Alhambra: Roll & Write (2020), a dice-rolling spin-off of the original game.

== Game company affiliation ==
- db-Spiele, a self-publishing company
- Queen Games

== Selected list of games ==
A full list is available in the external links section.

- Carat, 1993
- Rosenkönig, 1997
- Wallenstein, 2002
- Alhambra, 2003
- Shogun, 2006 (revision of Wallenstein)
