= Granadillo =

Granadillo may refer to:

- Brya ebenus, a species of flowering tree native to Cuba and Jamaica
- Dalbergia granadillo, a tree species native to Mexico and El Salvador
- Dalbergia retusa, a tree species native to Central America
- Hypericum canariense, a species of St. John's wort
- Zygia pithecolobioides (Granadillo de Río), a tree species in the legume family (Fabaceae)
- Platymiscium, a genus of legumes native to central and south America.
