= Antonio de Torres Jurado =

Spanish guitarist and luthier (1817-1892)

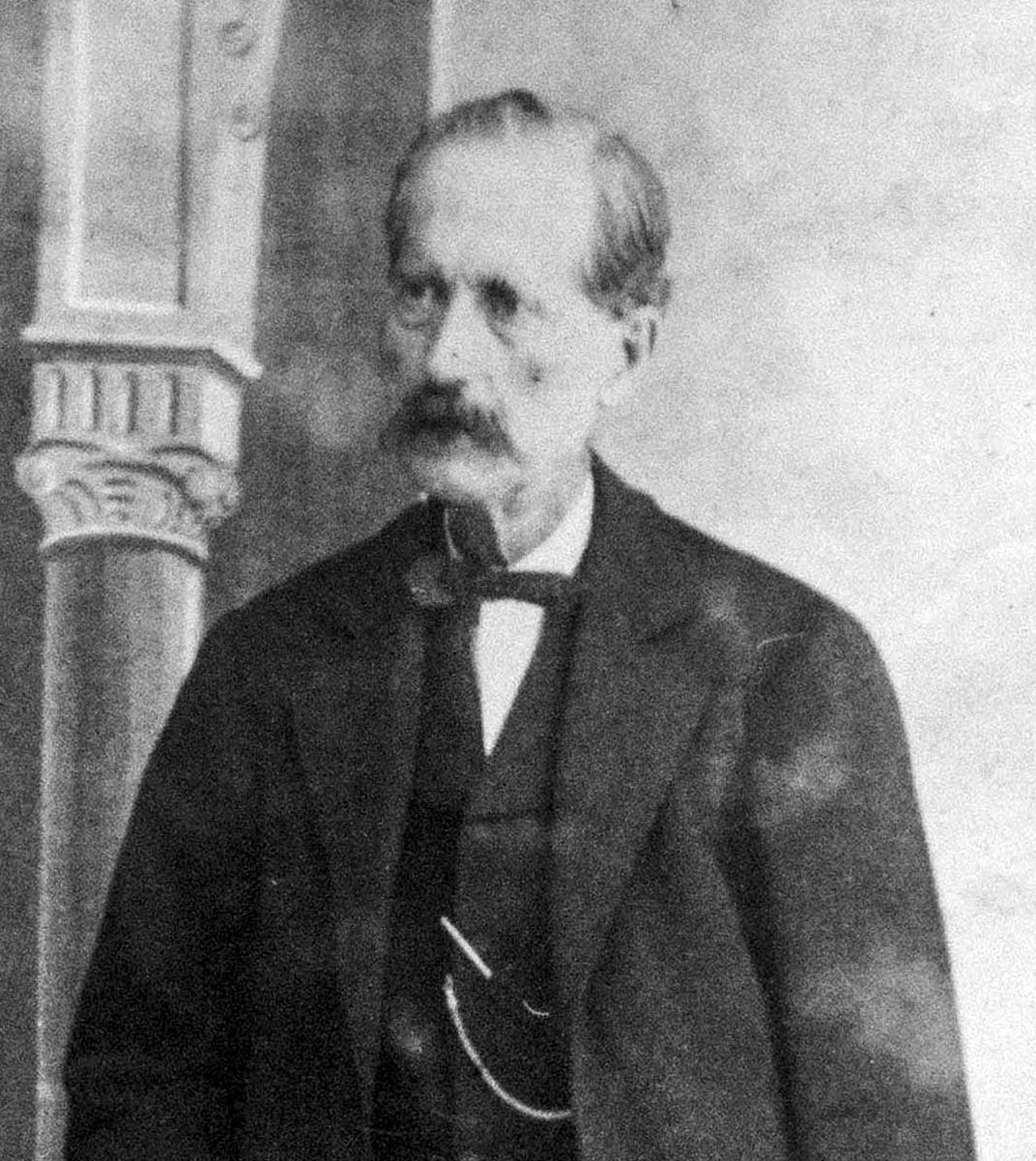
- 1884 portrait of de Torres Jurado
- Born: Antonio de Torres Jurado; 13 June 1817; Almería, Andalucía, Spain
- Died: 19 November 1892 (aged 75); Almería, Andalucía, Spain
- Occupations: Guitarist; luthier
- Spouses: Juana María López (m. 1835; died 1845) Josefa Martín Rosada (m. 1868; died 1883)
- Parents: Juan Torres (father); Maria Jurado (mother)

Antonio de Torres Jurado (13 June 1817 – 19 November 1892) was a Spanish guitarist and luthier, and "the most important Spanish guitar maker of the 19th century."

It is with his designs that the first recognizably modern classical guitars are to be seen. Most acoustic guitars in use today are derivatives of his designs.

== Biography ==
Antonio de Torres was the son of Juan Torres, a local tax collector, and Maria Jurado. As was common, when he was 12 he started an apprenticeship as a carpenter. In 1833, a dynastic war broke out, and soon after Torres was conscripted into the army. Through his father's machinations, young Antonio was dismissed as medically unfit for service. As only single men and widowers without children were subject to conscription, in 1835 his family pushed Torres into a hastily arranged marriage to Juana María López, the 13-year-old daughter of a shopkeeper. Children soon followed: a daughter in 1836, another in 1839, and a third in 1842, who died a few months later. His second daughter also died. In 1845 his wife died at the age of 23, of tuberculosis. These were difficult years for Torres, who was often in debt and forced to look for more lucrative forms of employment.

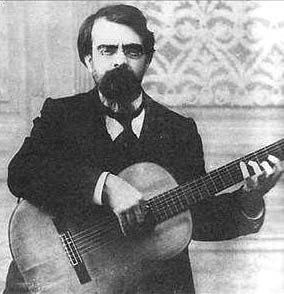
Francisco Tárrega playing a Torres-guitar

Although there is some debate as to who taught Torres, one theory is that sometime around 1842, Torres may have gone to work for José Pernas in Granada, rapidly learning to build guitars. He soon returned to Seville and opened a shop on the Calle de Cerrajería No. 7 that he shared with Manuel Soto y Solares. Although he made some guitars during the 1840s, it was not until the 1850s on the advice of the guitarist and composer Julián Arcas, that Torres made it his profession, and he began building in earnest. Julián Arcas offered Torres advice on building, and their collaboration turned Torres into an inveterate investigator of the guitar construction. Torres reasoned that the soundboard was key. To increase its volume, he not only made his guitars larger, but fitted them with thinner, hence lighter soundboards that were arched in both directions, made possible by a system of fan bracing for strength. These bracing struts were laid out geometrically, based on two isosceles triangles joined at their base creating a kite shape, within which the struts were set out symmetrically.

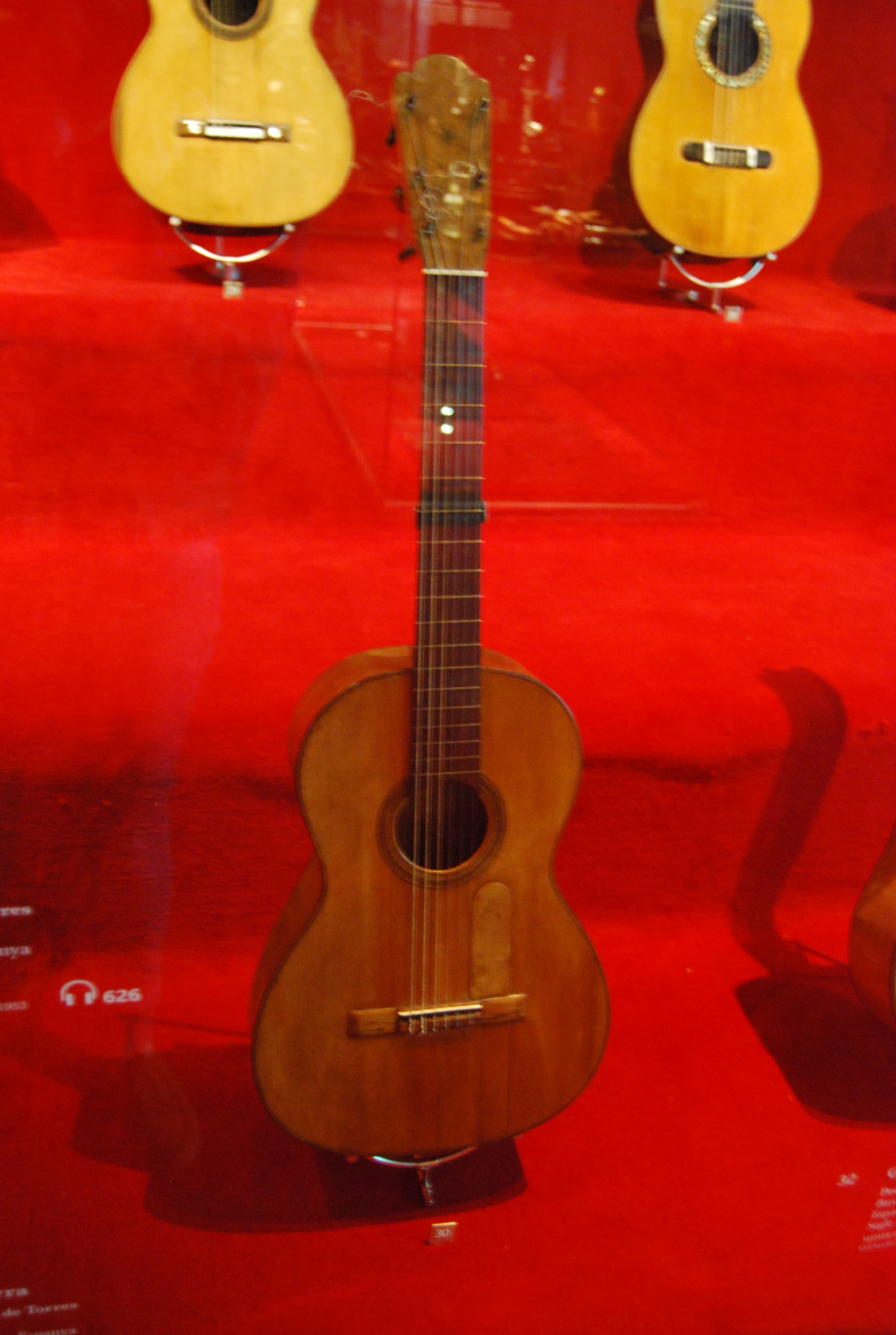
Guitar by Torres (1862) at Museu de la Música de Barcelona (MDMB 625).

While Torres was not the first to use this method he was the one who perfected the symmetrical design. To prove that it was the top, and not the back and sides of the guitar that gave the instrument its sound, in 1862 he built a guitar with back and sides of papier-mâché. (This guitar resides in the Museu de la Musica in Barcelona, and before the year 2000 it was restored to playable condition by the brothers Yagüe, Barcelona).

During his later years, Torres's close friend, a priest named Juan Martínez Sirvent, lent him a hand in his workshop. Many years later, in 1931 Sirvent wrote a letter to Francisco Rodríguez Torres, mentioning the following explanation Torres made when he, at the age of 68 was asked by the famous father Garzón at a dinner about his "secret" of how to make his outstandingly sounding guitars:

"[...] smilingly [Torres] responded: 'Father, I am very sorry that a man like you also falls victim to that idea that runs among ignorant people, Juanito (that is how he addressed me) has been witness to the secret many times, but it is impossible for me to leave the secret behind for posterity; this will go to the tomb with me for it is the result of the feel of the tips of the thumb and forefinger communicating to my intellect whether the soundboard is properly worked out to correspond with the guitar maker's concept and the sound required of the instrument'. Everyone was left convinced that the artistic genius cannot be passed on [...]"

In 1868, Torres married again, wedding Josefa Martín Rosada. Shortly after, Torres met Francisco Tárrega for the first time. Tárrega, who was then aged seventeen, had come to Seville from Barcelona to buy a Torres guitar from the maker of Julián Arcas' instrument. Torres offered him a modest guitar he had in stock, but on hearing him play, offered him a much better guitar that he had made for himself a few years before.

About 1870, Torres, who was then in his 50s, closed his shop in Seville and moved back to Almería where he and his wife opened up a china and crystal shop on the Calle Real. About five years later, Torres began his "second epoch" (as he referred to it on the labels of his guitars), building part-time when not busy in the china shop. After the death of his wife Josefa, in 1883, Torres began to devote increasing amounts of time to building guitars, making somewhere around 12 guitars a year until his death in La Cañada de San Urbano, Almería at the age of 75.

== Guitars ==
Torres guitars are divided into two periods: the first belonging to Sevilla from 1852 to 1870, the second being the years 1871–1893 in Almería. The guitars Torres made were so superior to those of his contemporaries that their example changed the way guitars were built, first in Spain, and then in the rest of the world. Although they are not particularly loud by modern standards, they have a clear, balanced, firm, and rounded tone that projects very well. His guitars were widely imitated and copied. Because he never signed his guitars, and only numbered those from his second epoch, many fake Torres have been made, some by well-known and expert makers.

While the overall pattern of the modern classical guitar derives from Torres, there are some differences between Torres's classical guitars and the modern instrument. Torres's guitars all had soundboards of European spruce; now western red cedar is also frequently used. Luthiers have continued to develop the bracing of the soundboard, but most still use some version of the fan-bracing that Torres's pioneered. Torres's guitars were strung with gut trebles and basses of silk threads, overwound with silver. Since the 1950s almost all classical guitars have been strung with nylon. The tuning heads of Torres's guitars were often set with traditional ebony friction pegs, similar to those of other string instruments. His later instruments were fitted with mechanical tuners, which are universal on classical guitars today.

== Inventory of guitars ==
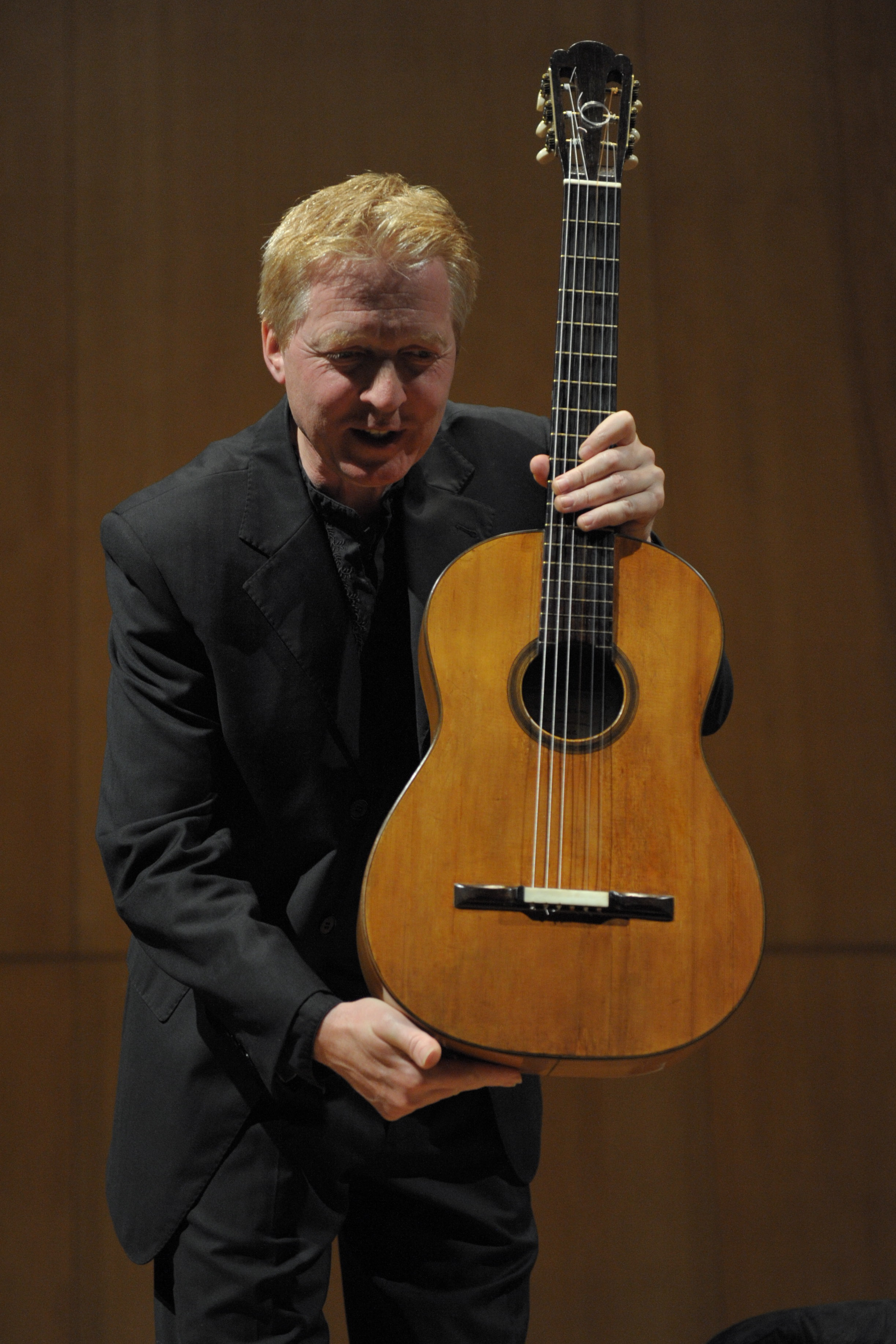
La Leona (1856) and Wulfin Lieske

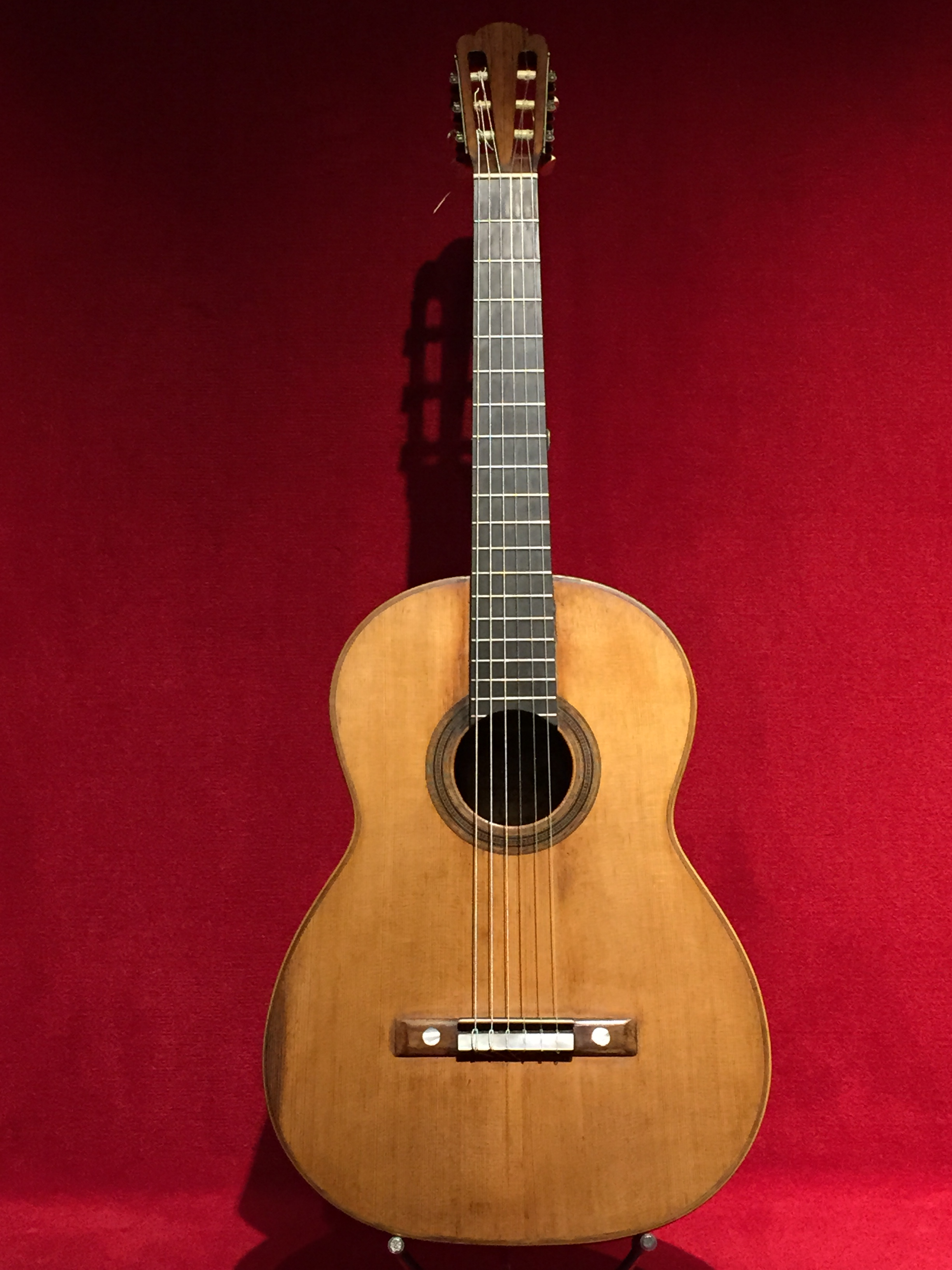
Guitar by Torres (1859) at Museu de la Música de Barcelona (MDMB 626)

This is an incomplete list of guitars made by Antonio de Torres.

- The Romeros have five Torres guitars of uncertain year. Pepe Romero owns three Torres guitars (including the FE03 of 1856); Celin Romero and Angel Romero each own one.
- FE 04 La Leona (1856) - owned by Erhard Hannen, now is being played by Wulfin Lieske.
- FE 09 (1859) - owned by Miguel Llobet, now in the collection of the Museu de la Música de Barcelona, Spain
- Sevilla, 1862 - Collection of José Luis Postigo
- FE 13 (1860): owned by Miguel Llobet, who often used it in concerts in Germany together with the FE09 (1859). Llobet sold it in the first half of the 1920s to Hermann Hauser I, who kept it throughout his life, drawing inspiration from it for the development of his famous guitar of 1937. The guitar is a rare example of the originality of the guitar concept that Torres carried forward in the First Epoch period as it has never undergone restoration and is still in the condition in which its maker left it. The guitar is currently part of the Raccosta Collection (Verona, Italy);
- FE 17 (1864) - initially made by Torres for his personal use, acquired by Francisco Tárrega in Seville, in 1869. The back and ribs were made from flamed maple. Sold by Vicente Tárrega (brother of Francisco Tárrega) to Domingo Prat in 1917.
- Almería, 1864 - Collection of Félix Manzanero
- FE 18 (1864), presently owned by James Westbrook, www.theguitarmuseum.com
- FE 28 (1868) - Collection of Marcos Villanueva
- SE 49 (1883) - owned by Francisco Tárrega
- SE 52 (1883) - owned by Angel Romero.
- SE 70 La Invencible (1884)
- SE 107 (1887) - now is being played by Stefano Grondona.
- SE 114 (1888) - owned by Francisco Tárrega, now in the collection of Sheldon Urlik
- SE 116 La Itálica (1888) - Once owned by Leon Farre, one of the great enthusiasts of the Barcelona guitar world in the first half of the 20th century. Due to its particular sound qualities, the guitar received special attention from Miguel Llobet, Domingo Prat, Emilio Pujol and other guitar enthusiasts. Due to the beauty of its voice, Prat and Pujol gave it the nickname “La Italica”, while Llobet christened it with the epithet “La Leona de Farre”, in honour of its owner Leon Farre. The guitar later belonged to the Barcelona luthier Enrique Coll (a student of Simplicio and a mentor to Fleta). The guitar seems to have come out of a time machine, as it has never undergone restoration and is still in the original condition in which Torres left it in 1888. The guitar currently belongs to the Raccosta Collection (Verona, Italy);
- SE 124 (1888) - Once owned by Regino Sainz de la Maza, restored and owned by luthier R. E. Bruné. Nearly identical to SE 114 but with birds eye maple sides and back.
- In the Museum Cité de la Musique in Paris
  - Almeria, 1885 (Torres 11-string model)
  - Sevilla, 1882
  - Almeria, 1852
  - Almeria, 1883
  - Almeria, 1875 (actually housed in: Musée du Palais Lascaris in Nice)
- In the Museu de la Música in Barcelona
