= Concierto Andaluz =

Musical work by Joaquín Rodrigo

The Concierto Andaluz (Spanish: Andalusian concerto) is a concerto for four guitars and orchestra by Spanish composer Joaquín Rodrigo. First played by Los Romeros in San Antonio, Texas, USA on 18 November 1967.

The three movements are:

1. Tiempo de Bolero
2. Adagio
3. Allegretto

== See also ==
- Los Romeros
- Concierto de Aranjuez
- Fantasia para un Gentilhombre
- Spanish guitar
