= Sonata a la Española =

Spanish sonata for solo guitar by Joaquín Rodrigo

Sonata a la Española is a sonata for solo guitar composed in 1969 by the Spanish composer Joaquín Rodrigo.

The piece has three movements. The first of these, allegro assai, introduces a steady tread against music with a nasal-like sound. The second, adagio, has a theme centered on the lower strings of the guitar. The final, allegro moderato, is a bolero mixed with the Spanish music.

== Movements ==
The Sonata a la Española has three movements:

1. Allegro assai
2. Adagio
3. Tempo de bolero

The third and final movement is more fully entitled "Allegro moderato (Tiempo de bolero)."

== Context ==
Rodrigo had personal and professional successes in the late 1960s: his first granddaughter was born in 1967, he was named Musician of the Year also in 1967, and he had been accepted into three academies in as many years from 1967 through 1969, when he published his Sonata a la Española.

== See also ==
- Fantasía para un gentilhombre
- Concierto de Aranjuez
