= Joaquín Rodrigo =

Spanish composer and pianist (1901–1999)

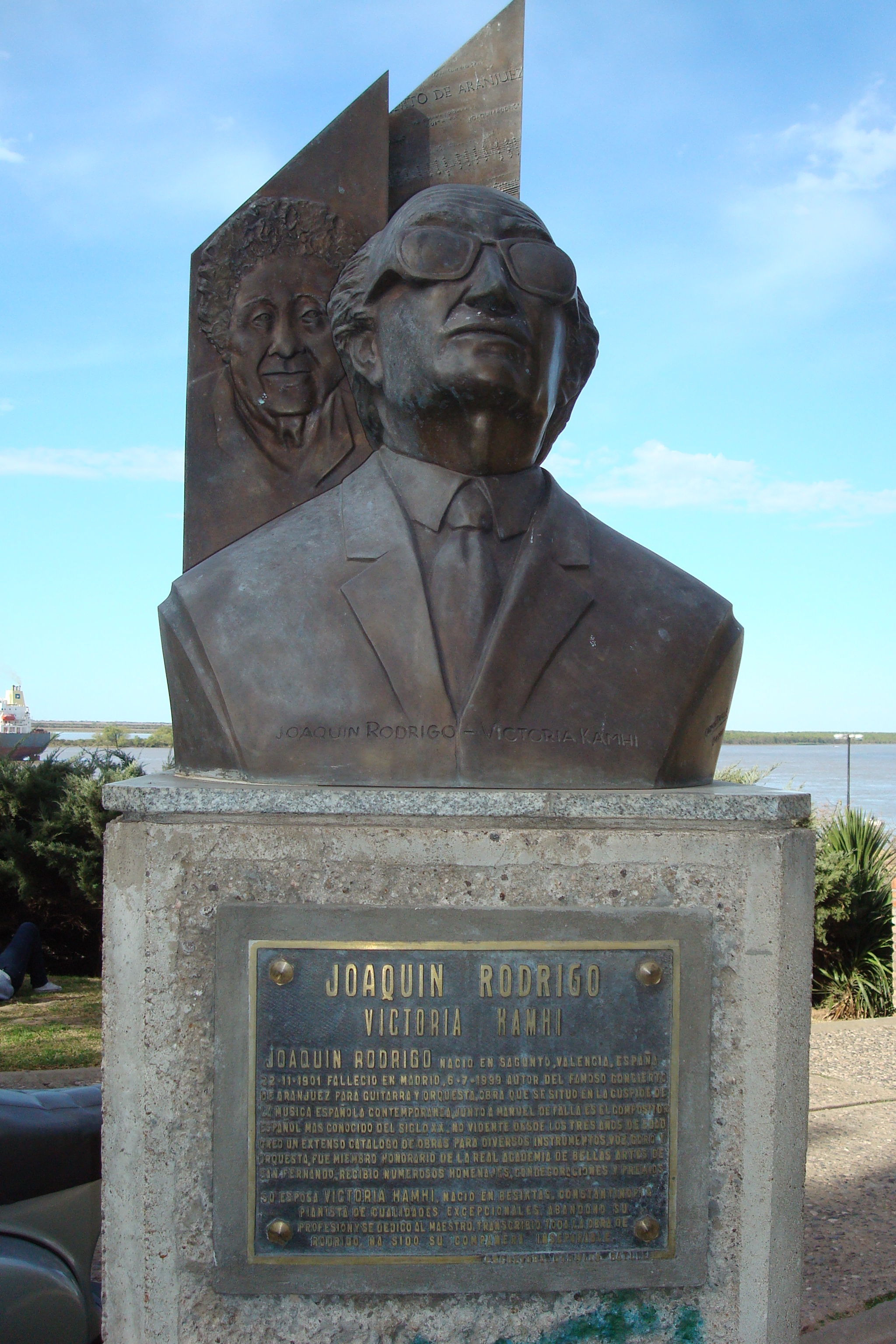
- Monument in Rosario, Argentina

Background information
- Born: 22 November 1901; Sagunto, Spain
- Died: 6 July 1999 (aged 97) Madrid, Spain
- Occupations: Composer; pianist
- Spouse: Victoria Kamhi (m. 1933; died 1997)
- Website: joaquin-rodrigo.com

Joaquín Rodrigo Vidre, 1st Marquess of the Gardens of Aranjuez (Spanish: [xoaˈkin roˈðɾiɣo]; 22 November 1901 – 6 July 1999), was a Spanish composer and a virtuoso pianist. He is best known for composing the Concierto de Aranjuez, a cornerstone of the classical guitar repertoire.

== Life ==
Rodrigo was born in Sagunto, Province of Valencia. At the age of three, he lost his sight completely after contracting diphtheria. At the age of eight he began to study solfège, piano, and violin and from the age of 16 he studied harmony and composition. He wrote his compositions in Braille and they were transcribed for publication. Although distinguished by having raised the Spanish guitar to dignity as a universal concert instrument and being best known for his guitar music, he never mastered playing the instrument.

Rodrigo studied music under Francisco Antich in Valencia and under Paul Dukas at the École Normale de Musique in Paris. After briefly returning to Spain, he returned to Paris to study musicology, first under Maurice Emmanuel, and then under André Pirro. His first published compositions date from 1923. From 1947, Rodrigo was a professor of music history, holding the Manuel de Falla Chair of Music in the Faculty of Philosophy and Letters, at Complutense University of Madrid. Notable students include Yüksel Koptagel, Turkish composer and pianist.

His most famous work, the Concierto de Aranjuez, was composed in 1939 in Paris for the guitarist Regino Sainz de la Maza. In later life, he and his wife, Victoria, declared that the work was written as a response to the miscarriage of their first child. The composition is a concerto for guitar and orchestra. The central adagio movement is one of the most recognizable in twentieth-century classical music, featuring the interplay of guitar with cor anglais.

This movement was later adapted by the jazz arranger Gil Evans for the 1960 album Sketches of Spain by Miles Davis. At the request of Nicanor Zabaleta, Rodrigo adapted the concerto for the 1974 Harp and Orchestra Concerto and he dedicated the adaptation to Zabaleta. Jazz guitarist Jim Hall further adapted the second movement on his recording titled "Concierto" (1975, Creed) which featured performances by Paul Desmond (alto sax), Steve Gadd (drums), Chet Baker (trumpet), Ron Carter (bass guitar) and Roland Hanna 8(piano).

The success of this concerto led to commissions from a number of prominent soloists, including Zabaleta, for whom Rodrigo dedicated his Concierto serenata for Harp and Orchestra. For Julian Lloyd Webber, Rodrigo composed his Concierto como un divertimento for cello and orchestra. For flutist James Galway, Rodrigo composed his Concierto pastoral for flute and orchestra.

In 1954, Rodrigo composed Fantasía para un gentilhombre at the request of Andrés Segovia. His Concierto Andaluz, for four guitars and orchestra, was commissioned by Celedonio Romero for him and his three sons.

Of Rodrigo's works, those that have achieved the greatest popular and critical success are his Concierto de Aranjuez and Fantasia para un gentilhombre. These two works are very often paired in recordings.

== Honors ==
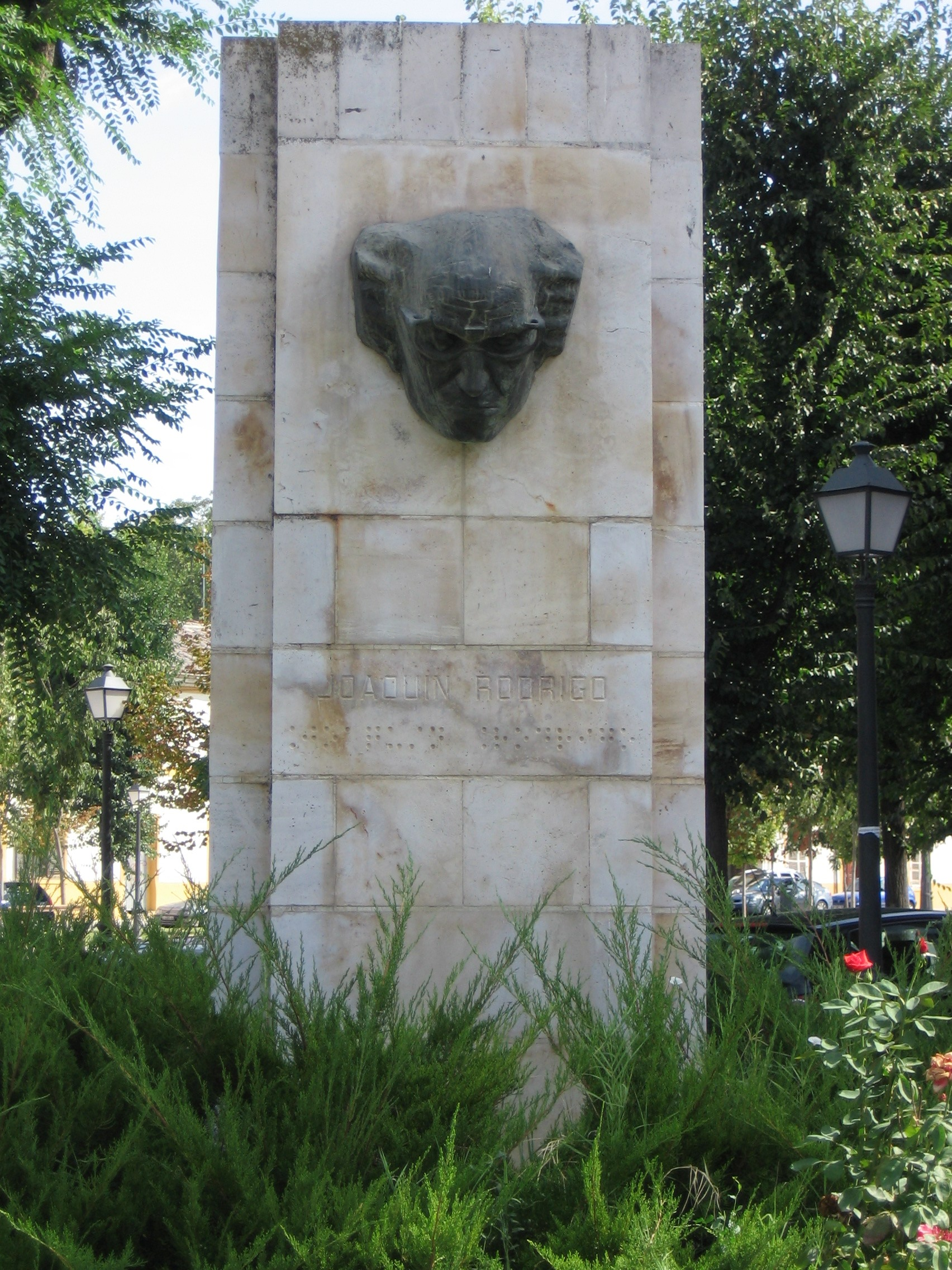
Monument in Aranjuez, Spain

Arms of the 1st Marquess of the Gardens of Aranjuez

He was awarded Spain's highest award for composition, the Premio Nacional de Música, in 1983. On 30 December 1991, Rodrigo was raised into the Spanish nobility by King Juan Carlos I with the hereditary title of Marqués de los Jardines de Aranjuez (English: Marquess of the Gardens of Aranjuez). He received the prestigious Prince of Asturias Award – Spain's highest civilian honor – in 1996. He was named Commander of the Order of Arts and Letters by the French government in 1998.

== Personal life ==
He married Victoria Kamhi in 1933. She was a Turkish-born pianist whom he had met in Paris. They shared professional interests and she documented their life together in Hand in Hand With Joaquín Rodrigo: My Life at the Maestro's Side (1992). Their marriage lasted until her death in 1997. Their daughter, Cecilia, was born on 27 January 1941.

Rodrigo died at his home in Madrid on 6 July 1999, aged 97. His daughter succeeded him as Marquesa de los Jardines de Aranjuez. Joaquín Rodrigo and his wife Victoria are buried at the cemetery at Aranjuez.

== Works ==
=== Orchestral ===
- Orchestra
  - Juglares (1923); first public performance: 1924, Valencia
  - Cinco Piezas Infantiles (1928)
  - Tres viejos aires de danza (1929; first performance on 20 January 1930 by the Orquesta Sinfónica de Valencia conducted by José Manuel Izquierdo)
  - Dos miniaturas andaluzas (1929; first performance on 22 November 1999 at the Palau de la Música de Valencia, Spain, by the Orquesta de Cámara Joaquín Rodrigo)
  - Zarabanda lejana y Villancico (1930; first performance on 9 March 1931 at the Ecole Normale de Musique in Paris, by the Orquesta Femenina de París, conducted by Jane Evrard)
  - Per la flor del Lliri Blau, symphonic poem (1934; First Prize, Círculo de Bellas Artes)
  - Soleriana (first performance by the Berlin Philharmonic conducted by Hans von Benda, on 22 August 1953 in Berlin)
  - Pavana Real (1955)
  - Música para un jardín (1957) [Orchestration of his two piano Berceuses]
  - A la busca del más allá (1976; commissioned by the Houston Symphony for the United States Bicentennial, Rodrigo was inspired by the thought of space exploration)
  - Palillos y panderetas (1982)
- Rondalla
  - Estudiantina (1962)
- Symphonic Wind Ensemble
  - Homenaje a la Tempranica (1939; first performance, 1939, in Paris by the Orquesta Femenina de París, conducted by Jane Evrard)
  - Homenaje a Sagunto (1955)
  - Adagio Para Orquesta de Instrumentos de Viento (1966; first performance in June 1966 in Pittsburgh, Pennsylvania, by the American Wind Symphony Orchestra, conducted by Robert Austin Boudreau)
  - Pasodoble para Paco Alcalde (1975)

=== Concertante ===
- Cello
  - Dos piezas caballerescas for four-piece cello orchestra (1945; first performance on 27 May 1945 in Madrid by cello ensemble students of Juan Ruiz Casaux) – later transcribed for four guitars by Peter Jermer
  - Concierto en modo galante (1949; first performance on 4 November 1949 in Madrid by Gaspar Cassadó, with the Orquesta Nacional de España, conducted by Ataulfo Argenta)
  - Concierto como un divertimento (1981)
- Flute
  - Aria antigua (1960)
  - Concierto pastoral (1978)
- Guitar
  - Concierto de Aranjuez (1939)
  - Fantasía para un gentilhombre (1954)
  - Concierto madrigal for two guitars (1966; commissioned by Alexandre Lagoya and Ida Presti; first performance on 30 July 1967 at the Hollywood Bowl in Los Angeles, by Angel Romero and Pepe Romero, with the Los Angeles Symphony conducted by Rafael Frühbeck de Burgos)
  - Concierto Andaluz for four guitars (1967)
  - Concierto para una fiesta (1982; first performance on 5 March 1983 at the Ridglea Country Club in Fort Worth, by Pepe Romero, with the Texas Little Symphony conducted by John Giordano)
  - Rincones de España (1990; first performance by Angel Romero on 7 March 1991 at New York's Lincoln Center)
- Harp
  - Concierto serenata (1952)
  - Sones en la Giralda (1963; written as a wedding present for the harpist Marisa Robles) – later transcribed for guitar and orchestra by Pepe Romero
- Piano
  - Concierto heroico (1943) (revised by the composer as Piano Concerto (1995) and first performed in 1999)
- Violin
  - Dos esbozos for violin and piano (1923; Rodrigo's "Opus 1")
  - Cançoneta for violin and string orchestra (1923; first performance in 1923 in Valencia, Spain, by the Orquesta Sinfónica de Valencia, conducted by José Manuel Izquierdo)
  - Concierto de estío (1944; first performance on 16 April 1944 by Enrique Iniesta, at the Teatro San Carlos in Lisbon, with the Orquesta Nacional de España, conducted by Bartolomé Pérez Casas)
  - Set Cançons Valencianes for violin and piano (1982)

=== Instrumental ===
- Bandoneón
  - Motu perpetuo (1960)
- Cello
  - Como una fantasía (1979; first performance on 17 March 1981 by Carlos Prieto, in Mexico City)
- Guitar
  - Zarabanda lejana (1926; first performance by Joaquín Nin-Culmell, in Paris)
  - Toccata para guitarra (1933; first performance on 1 June 2006 by Marcin Dylla, in Madrid)
  - En Los Trigales (1938; first performance by Regino Sainz de la Maza; later published as part of Por los campos de España)
  - Tiento Antiguo (1942; first performance in 1942 by Regino Sainz de la Maza)
  - Three Spanish Pieces – Tres Piezas Españolas (Fandango, Passacaglia, Zapateado) (1954; dedicated to Andrés Segovia)
  - Bajando de la meseta (1954; first performance by Nicolás Alfonso in Brussels; later published as part of Por los campos de España)
  - Entre olivares (1956; dedicated to Manuel López Ramos; later published as part of Por los campos de España)
  - En tierras de Jerez (1957; dedicated to Luise Walker)
  - Tonadilla (1959; first performance by the guitar duo of Ida Presti and Alexandre Lagoya)
  - Junto al Generalife (1959; first performance by Siegfried Behrend)
  - Sonata Giocosa (1960; dedicated to Renata Tarragó)
  - Invocación y danza (1961; first performance on 12 May 1962 by Alirio Díaz at the Château de la Brède near Bordeaux, France – first prize, Coupe International de Guitare, awarded by Office de Radiodiffusion-Télévision Française [ORTF])
  - Sonata a la Española (1963; dedicated to Ernesto Bitetti)
  - Tres pequeñas piezas (Ya se van los pastores, Por caminos de Santiago, Pequeña Sevillana) (1963)
  - Elogio de la guitarra (1971; written for the guitarist Angelo Gilardino, who gave the first performance)
  - Pajaros de primavera (1972; commissioned by Dr. Isao Takahashi, a promoter of classical guitar in Japan, for his wife Take Takahashi; first performed in 1972 at the hospital bedside of Take Takahashi in Japan, "interpreted by a guitarist friend", as she was dying of cancer; Christopher Parkening gave the first public performance, also in Japan).
  - Dos preludios (1976; first performance in 1989 by Celedonio Romero in Los Angeles, and first recording by Wolfgang Lendle)
  - Tríptico (1978; first performance in 1978 by Alexandre Lagoya at the Château de Rougerie in France)
  - Un tiempo fue Itálica famosa (1981; first performance in 1989 by Randy Pile in San Diego)
  - Ecos de Sefarad (1987; first performance in 1989 by Sherri Rottersman at the Círculo Medina in Madrid)
  - ¡Qué buen caminito! (1987; first performance in 1987 by María Esther Guzmán at the Conservatorio de Música de Sevilla)
  - Aranjuez, ma pensée (1988) (arranged by the composer from his Concierto de Aranjuez)
- Harp
  - Impromptu (1959; first performance by Ana María Martini Gil)
- Piano (solo), and harpsichord
  - Suite pour piano (1923)
  - Berceuse d'automne (1923)
  - Preludio al Gallo mañanero (1926)
  - Zarabanda lejana (1926)
  - Pastorale (1926)
  - Bagatela (1926)
  - Berceuse de printemps (1928)
  - Air de Ballet sur le nom d'une Jeune Fille (1930)
  - Serenata Española (1931)
  - Sonada de adiós ('Homenaje a Paul Dukas') (1935)
  - Cuatro Piezas (Caleseras, Fandango del ventorrillo, Prayer of the Princess of Castile, Danza Valenciana) (1936–1938)
  - Tres Danzas de España (Rústica, Danza de los tres doncellas, Serrana) (1941)
  - A l'ombre de Torre Bermeja (1945)
  - Cuatro Estampas Andaluzas (1946–1952)
  - El Album de Cecilia (María de los Reyes, Jota de las Palomas, Canción del Hada rubia, Canción del Hada morena, El negrito Pepo, Borriquillos a Belén) (1948)
  - Cinco Sonatas de Castilla, con Toccata a modo de Pregón (1950–1951)
  - Aranjuez, ma pensée (1968) (arranged by the composer from his Concierto de Aranjuez)
  - Danza de la Amapola (1972)
  - Preludio y Ritornello (1979) (for HARPSICHORD)
  - Tres Evocaciones (Tarde en el parque, Noche en el Guadalquivir, Triana) (1980–1981)
  - Preludio de Añoranza (1987)
- Piano (duet and two pianos)
  - Juglares (1923) (piano duet) (arranged by the composer from his first work for orchestra)
  - Cinco Piezas Infantiles (Son chicos que pasan, Después de un cuento, Mazurka, Plegaria, Gritería) (1924) (TWO PIANOS) (arranged by the composer from his second work for orchestra)
  - Gran Marcha de los Subsecretarios (1941) (piano duet)
  - Atardecer (1975) (piano duet)
  - Sonatina para dos Muñecas (1977) (piano duet)
- Violin
  - Capriccio (1944; first performance on 8 January 1946 by Enrique Iniesta in Madrid)

=== Vocal and choral ===
- Ave Maria for unaccompanied choir (1923)
- Ausencias de Dulcinea (1948); First prize, Cervantes Competition
- Cuatro Madrigales Amatorios (1948)
- De las doce canciones españolas (Textos populares adaptados por Victoria Kamhi) (1951)
- Villancicos y canciones de navidad (1952); Ateneo de Madrid Prize
- Música para un códice salamantino (1953), lyrics by Miguel de Unamuno
- Cuatro canciones sefardíes (1965)
- El Hijo Fingido, Zarzuela
- Porque toco el pandero
- Cántico de San Francisco de Asís (1982)
- Tres canciones

=== Guitar and voice ===
- Coplas del Pastor Enamorado (1935)
- Tres Canciones Españolas (1951)
- Tres Villancicos (1952)
- Romance de Durandarte (1955)
- Folías Canarias (1958)
- Aranjuez, ma pensée (1988)

Spanish nobility
New title	Marquess of the Gardens of Aranjuez; 30 December 1991 – 6 July 1999	Succeeded by Cecilia Rodrigo Kamhi
