= Concierto pastoral =

Flute concerto by Joaquín Rodrigo

The Concierto pastoral is a flute concerto by Joaquín Rodrigo. Rodrigo wrote the work during 1977–78 on commission from James Galway, who had first encountered the composer's work in 1974 when he asked permission to transcribe the Fantasia para un Gentilhombre for flute. Galway gave its premiere on October 17, 1978, in London, with Eduardo Mata conducting the Philharmonia Orchestra.

As the concerto being labeled pastoral, it has hints of shepherd themes and folk melodies as part of a nostalgic Spanish rural idyll of Andalusia. The concerto has gained a reputation among flautists for its exceptional technical requirements.

== Movements ==
The concerto is in three movements, the second of which is the source of the name "pastoral":

1. Allegro
2. Adagio
3. Rondo (allegro)

The first and third movements contain many intervals of sevenths, octaves and ninths, as well as considerable use of grace notes and appoggiaturas.
