= Manuel de Soto y Solares =

Spanish luthier

Manuel de Soto y Solares (born 1839 in Sevilla, Andalucía – d. 1906) was a Spanish luthier.

== Biography ==
Manuel de Soto was born in Seville on 1 February 1839, the son of Manuel de Soto Castañón, also a guitar maker, and María del Carmen Solares. Both grandfathers (Manuel de Soto Castañón and Manuel Solares) were also guitar makers.

Manuel de Soto y Soares had his workshop at street Cerragería 7 in Seville and had a close relationship with Antonio de Torres, whose workshop was a few doors from his. According to Jose Ramirez III, if Torres made a guitar that didn't meet his expectations, he would sell it to Manuel who would sell it under his label

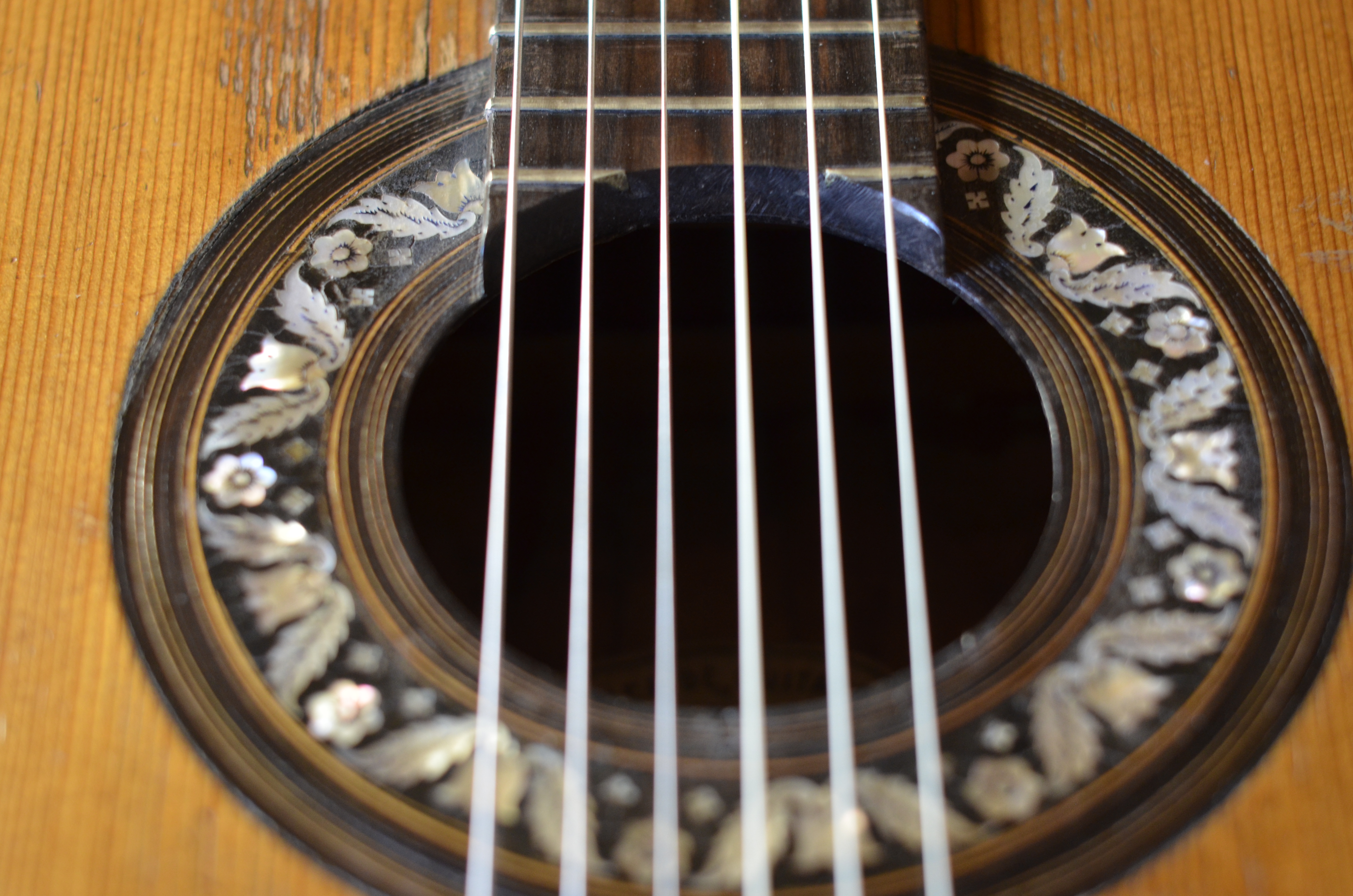
Rosette detail in a Manuel de Soto's guitar.

== Guitars ==
Manuel de Soto's guitars were influenced heavily by Antonio de Torres. He embraced enthusiastically Torres' style of construction and some important guitarists used his guitars, after Torres moved from Seville to Almeria in 1870. One of the most important ones was Juan Breva (1844–1918) who used a Manuel de Soto y Solares guitar made between 1870 and 1890.

There are only twenty or so guitars known by Manuel de Soto y Solares and all of them so that he was a highly skilled artisan.

He died of a heart attack on 28 July 1906.

His daughter Francisca de Soto kept the business and labelled her guitars as the successor to Manuel Soto (sucesora de Manuel de Soto).
