= Marquess of the Jardines de Aranjuez =

Arms of Joaquín Rodrigo, 1st Marquess of the Gardens of Aranjuez

Marquess of the Jardines de Aranjuez (Spanish: Marqués de los Jardines de Aranjuez) is a hereditary title in the Spanish nobility. This marquessate was created by King Juan Carlos I in favor of composer Joaquín Rodrigo on 30 December 1991. His music counts among some of the most popular of the 20th century. Rodrigo's title recalls his Concierto de Aranjuez, which is considered one of the pinnacles of the Spanish music. It was inspired by the gardens of the Royal Palace of Aranjuez, the spring resort palace and gardens built by King Philip II in the last half of the 16th century. The work attempts to transport the listener to another place and time through the evocation of the sounds of nature.

The current holder of the title is Joaquín Rodrigo's only child, Cecilia Rodrigo Kamhi (b. 1941)
The heir apparent is the present holder’s elder daughter, Cecilia León Rodrigo (b. 1967)

== List of Marquesses ==
- Joaquín Rodrigo Vidre, 1st Marquess of the Jardines de Aranjuez (1901–1999)
- Cecilia Rodrigo Kamhi, 2nd Marchioness of the Jardines de Aranjuez (b. 1941)
