= Patti Laursen =

American classical music record producer

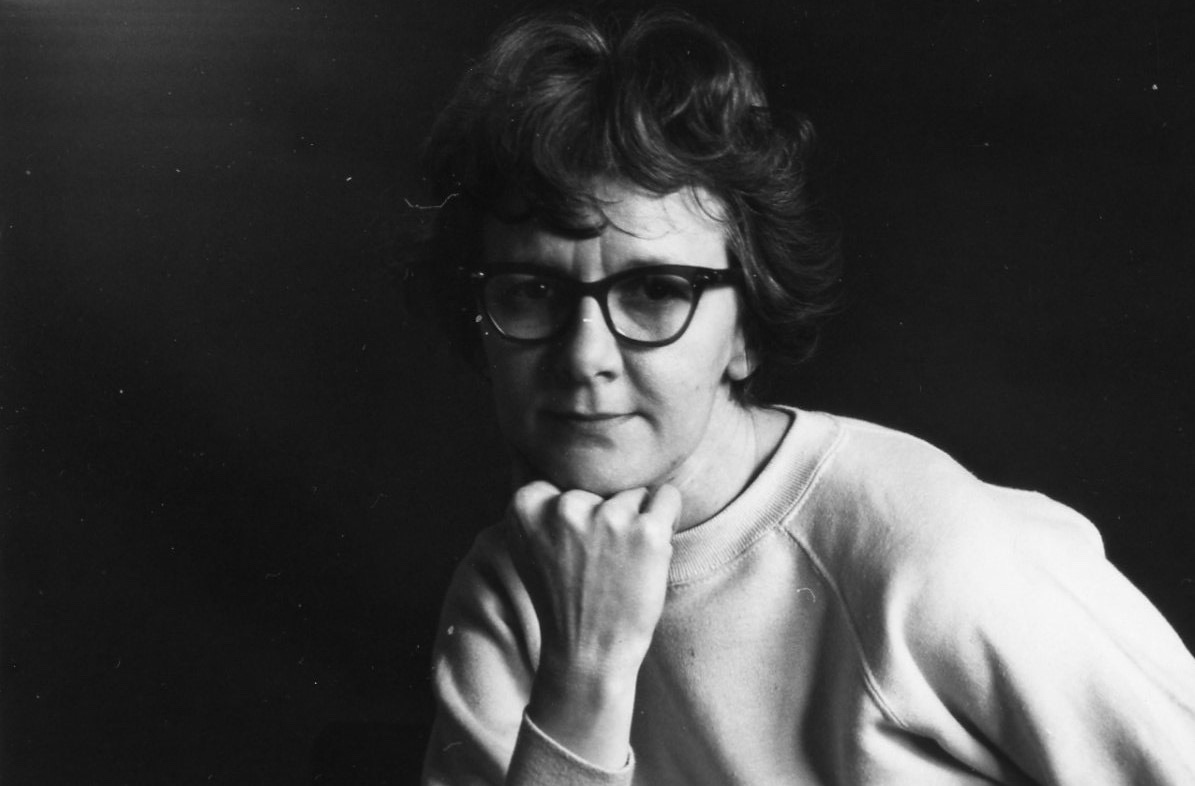
Classical music producer Patti Laursen.

Patti Laursen (September 19, 1927 – June 16, 2013) was an internationally renowned classical music record producer from the United States. Laursen produced a discography of distinguished recordings primarily for the Capitol, Angel and EMI labels. Commencing her recording career in the 1960s, Patti Laursen was one of the first female record producers and an industry leader in the “digital revolution” in the late 1970s. Laursen was nominated for the Classical Producer of the Year Grammy in 1990.

== Early life ==
She was born Patti Whitney in South Pasadena, California, United States, the youngest of the six children of Patti and Howard Almeron Whitney.

== Recording career ==
Laursen joined the classical music division of Capitol Records in 1963, and assumed in-house producer responsibilities in 1969. During her three decade tenure with the company, she rose to become the Director of Artists and Repertoire, Angel Records, then Capitol’s classical label in the United States. Laursen produced recordings for the Angel/EMI label as well as on a freelance basis internationally after her retirement from Capitol in 1987.

=== Artists ===
During her career, Laursen produced recordings by leading classical artists, including: Kathleen Battle, Martha Argerich, Itzhak Perlman, Yehudi Menuhin, Ravi Shankar, Andre Watts, Christopher Parkening, Angel Romero, Ransom Wilson, David Shifrin, Florence Quivar, Aprile Millo, Elly Ameling, Bruce Hubbard, Nadja Salerno-Sonnenberg, Leonard Pennario, George Shearing, Michael Feinstein, Lee Erwin, Richard Kline, John Bayless, Nancy Allen, Sir Simon Rattle, Dennis Russell Davies, Gerard Schwarz, Leonard Slatkin, Edo de Waart, James Judd, the Los Angeles Chamber Orchestra, Empire Brass, the Tokyo String Quartet, the London Philharmonia Orchestra, the New York Chamber Symphony, the St. Louis Symphony, the Minnesota Orchestra, among others.

=== Recordings ===
Notable recordings produced by Laursen include:

- Pleasures of Their Company (Kathleen Battle and Christopher Parkening—nominated for the 1986 Best Classical Album Grammy Award)
- Music from Saratoga (Martha Argerich and Itzhak Perlman) EMI Classics 5190878
- John Adams Grand Pianola Music/Steve Reich Vermont Counterpoint (first recording; Ransom Wilson with the Solisti NY) Angel 4DS-37345
- Andre Watts at Carnegie Hall 25th Anniversary Recital (Andre Watts) EMI Classics 64598
- Improvisations West Meets East Vol. 3 (Yehudi Menuhin, Ravi Shankar and Jean-Pierre Rampal) Angel SFO-37200
- Guitar Transcriptions of J.S. Bach (Christopher Parkening) EMI 1049E
- Spanish Virtuoso; Romantic Music for Guitar (Angel Romero) Angel CDC-49885

Laursen produced the first recordings of significant contemporary music, and was an early and enthusiastic collaborator with composers John Adams, Steve Reich, and Daniel Lentz.

In addition, Laursen pioneered the labels’ bestselling classical crossover recordings including:

- Claude Bolling’s Concerto for Guitar and Jazz Piano (Angel Romero, George Shearing, Shelly Manne, Ray Brown) Angel DS37327
- Sound of Silents; Music for Classic Silent Films (organist Lee Erwin) Angel S-36073
- A Christmas Celebration (Kathleen Battle, Leonard Slatkin, the Boys’ Choir of Harlem) EMI Classics CDC-47687
- Over There; Songs of War and Peace c. 1900-1920 by Berlin, Cohan, Lehar, Schoenberg, Weill and many more (Michael Feinstein) Angel CDC 7 497682
- Ride On, King Jesus! African-American Spirituals (Florence Quivar, Harlem Boys’ Choir) Angel CDC-49885
- Koto Vivaldi (New Koto Ensemble of Japan) Angel S-37450
- Jonathan Winters Tells the Stories of Peter and the Wolf (Efrem Kurtz and the Philharmonia Orchestra) Angel CDC7499182

=== Digital leader ===
Laursen was one of the first producers to anticipate the transition from analog to digital recording. She learned the new systems before many of her colleagues and is recognized in the industry for her leading role as change revolutionized recorded sound. In 1979, Laursen produced the first digital recordings made by Capitol Records, with engineers Bob Norberg and Mitchell Tanenbaum. In a one-week period in November of that year, Laursen, Norberg, and Tanenbaum digitally recorded Bach and Telemann Suites (flutist Ransom Wilson with Gerard Schwarz conducting the Los Angeles Chamber Orchestra), the Claude Bolling Concerto for Guitar and Jazz Piano (Romero, Shearing, Manne, and Browne, referenced above) and Bach’s The Six Brandenburg Concertos (Gerard Schwarz conducting the Los Angeles Chamber Orchestra, Angel DSSC-4504).

At the beginning of the digital era, growth was hampered because there were only a few production facilities and limited capacity. In the interim as facilities were built, Laursen devised a concept to improve the sound quality of long playing records by producing albums recorded at 45 RPM. She introduced the “Angel Sonic Series;” LPs with sound recorded at cleaner, higher frequencies. Albums in the series are now collector's items.

=== Laursen in the recording studio ===
As a record producer, Laursen played a dynamic role in the recording studio, as described in this written account:

Laursen followed every note of the score. No intonation slip escaped her notice; no weak attack or blurred passage got past her. She quickly stopped any take that didn't measure up, but was just as fast to give out praise -- she repeatedly sent out a "Bravo" to the orchestra via an intercom. On a phone hookup, she communicated privately with Judd between takes, suggesting a slight change in phrasing here, a dynamic shift there. He trusted her judgment, and so did the players. Many of them joined the conductor during breaks to listen to playbacks on speakers and the more revealing headphones...The focus then shifted to the suite from Henry V. The load-carrying brass section was tired, but Laursen's instincts told her to keep going. "The sap is up – let's do it," she said, and the orchestra plunged into the Charge and Battle movement. She was right -- the results were electric.

== National Academy of Recording Arts and Sciences (NARAS) ==
Patti Laursen was nominated for the “Classical Producer of the Year” award at the 1990 NARAS Grammy Awards. In addition, Laursen was nominated as the producer of the 1986 Best Classical Album nominee Pleasures of Their Company with Christopher Parkening and Kathleen Battle as well the 1978 Best Classical Album award for Parkening and the Guitar. Additional albums with Laursen received Grammy nominations in various categories, including Koto Flute; Four Flute Concertos by Vivaldi (produced in Japan and remastered by Laursen in the US; Angel Records S-37325) with Ransom Wilson and the New Koto Ensemble of Tokyo; Ravel Introduction and Allegro (produced by Laursen; Angel Records DS-537339) with Nancy Allen, Ransom Wilson, David Shifrin and the Tokyo Quartet. She served for several years on the NARAS classical music nominations screening committee.

== Personal background ==
Laursen earned a Bachelor of Arts from California State University, Los Angeles in 1950. She was married to artist Tom Laursen who predeceased her in 1992. Patti Laursen’s many interests included sewing, weaving, bookbinding, the Sierra Club Advocacy Program, cats, and fighting City Hall.

== Death ==
Patti Laursen died on Sunday, June 16, 2013 in Los Angeles, California, after a long illness.
