= Celedonio Romero =

Cuban guitarist, composer and poet (1913–1996)

Celedonio Romero - An Evening of Guitar Music

Celedonio Romero (2 March 1913 – 8 May 1996) was a guitarist, composer and poet, perhaps best known as the founder of The Romeros guitar quartet.

== Biography ==
Celedonio Romero was born in Cienfuegos, Cuba, while his parents were on a business trip to the island. He began playing the guitar at the age of 5, and eventually studied music theory, harmony, composition, and counterpoint at the Conservatory of Málaga and at the Madrid Royal Conservatory, where he was taught by Joaquín Turina. Romero never studied with a guitar teacher. Although he made his concert debut at the age of 22 and was well known in Spain, the Franco government refused to permit him to give concerts abroad, keeping him unknown from the rest of the world. His wife, Angelita, was a singer and stage actress who had studied at Málaga's Royal Academy of Fine Arts.

After secretly obtaining an American visa, the family secured permission to visit an ailing relative in Portugal in 1957. However, rather than returning to Spain, the family settled in Southern California, and Celedonio and his three sons Celin, Pepe, and Angel started a guitar quartet, The Romeros, and also began to take on guitar students. Celedonio Romero was Christopher Parkening's first teacher; and then Pepe also taught Parkening. Flamenco guitarist David Maldonado also studied under Celedonio Romero. Angelita Romero can be heard playing castanets on some of the quartet's recordings.

Celedonio made a large number of recordings, both solo and with the Romeros, which appeared on the Delos and Philips labels. He also wrote over 100 compositions for guitar, including a dozen concertos.

Romero died of lung cancer at the age of 83 in San Diego, California. He was inducted into the Orden de Isabel la Católica by King Juan Carlos I. He was also made a "Caballero del Santo Sepulcro" ("Knight of the Holy Sepulchre") by Pope John Paul II.

== Compositions ==
Many of the dates below are publication dates rather than when the work was first composed.

- Suite andaluza: para guitarra
- Estudio. La Mariposa
- Tango Angelita: for voice and guitar or solo guitar (1931)
- Noche en malaga (1940)
- Romantic Prelude (1945)
- Gavota para guitarra (1980)
- Tema y variaciones: Homenaje a Fernando Sor: para guitarra (1981)
- Cinco preludios para guitarra (1981)
- Concierto de Malaga: por soleares (1981; orchestration by Federico Moreno Torroba)
- La Catedral de Colonia: para guitarra (1983)
- Diez preludios: VI al XV, para guitarra (1983)
- Preludios; y, Canción para guitarra (1983)
- Dos mazurkas para guitarra (1983)
- Sonata scarlatta: para guitarra: no. 1 para guitarra (1984)
- Celin: tango: para guitarra (1984)
- Fiesta andaluza: concierto para guitarra y orquesta (1985)
- Sonata Scarlatta: no. 2 para guitarra (1986)
- El cortijo de Don Sancho: suite para guitarra y orquesta (1986)
- Fantasia cortesana : suite antigua para guitarra y orquesta (1986)
- Los Maestros: tres canciones para tres principales: guitarra (1986)
- Suite madrileña, no. 1 para guitarra (1986)
- Suite madrileña, no. 2 (1986)
- Pepe: vals, para guitarra (1986)
- Angel: vals no. 1 para guitarra (1986)
- Angel vals: no. 2 para guitarra (1986)
- Guitarras del museo : para quintarra y orquesta (1987)
- Nocturno de la bahia y la farola (1987)
- La Petenera se ha muerto y los pajaros vuelan: for guitar (1987)
- El Embrujo de gibralfaro y puerta oscura: concierto no. 8 (1988)
- Fantasia española: poema a la guitarra (guitarra y orquesta) (1988)
- Suite number 9 (La española): Concerto for 2 guitars and orchestra (1992)
- Canción(sobre la petenera) (1993)
- Habanera (1993)
- Danza andaluza: no 1 (1993)
- Danza andaluza: no 2 (1993)

== See also ==
The Romero Guitar Quartet

- 1960–90: Celedonio Romero, Celin Romero, Pepe Romero, Angel Romero
- 1990–96: Celedonio Romero, Celin Romero, Pepe Romero, Celino Romero
- since 1996: Celin Romero, Pepe Romero, Celino Romero, Lito Romero
