= Angel Romero (guitarist) =

Spanish guitarist and conductor

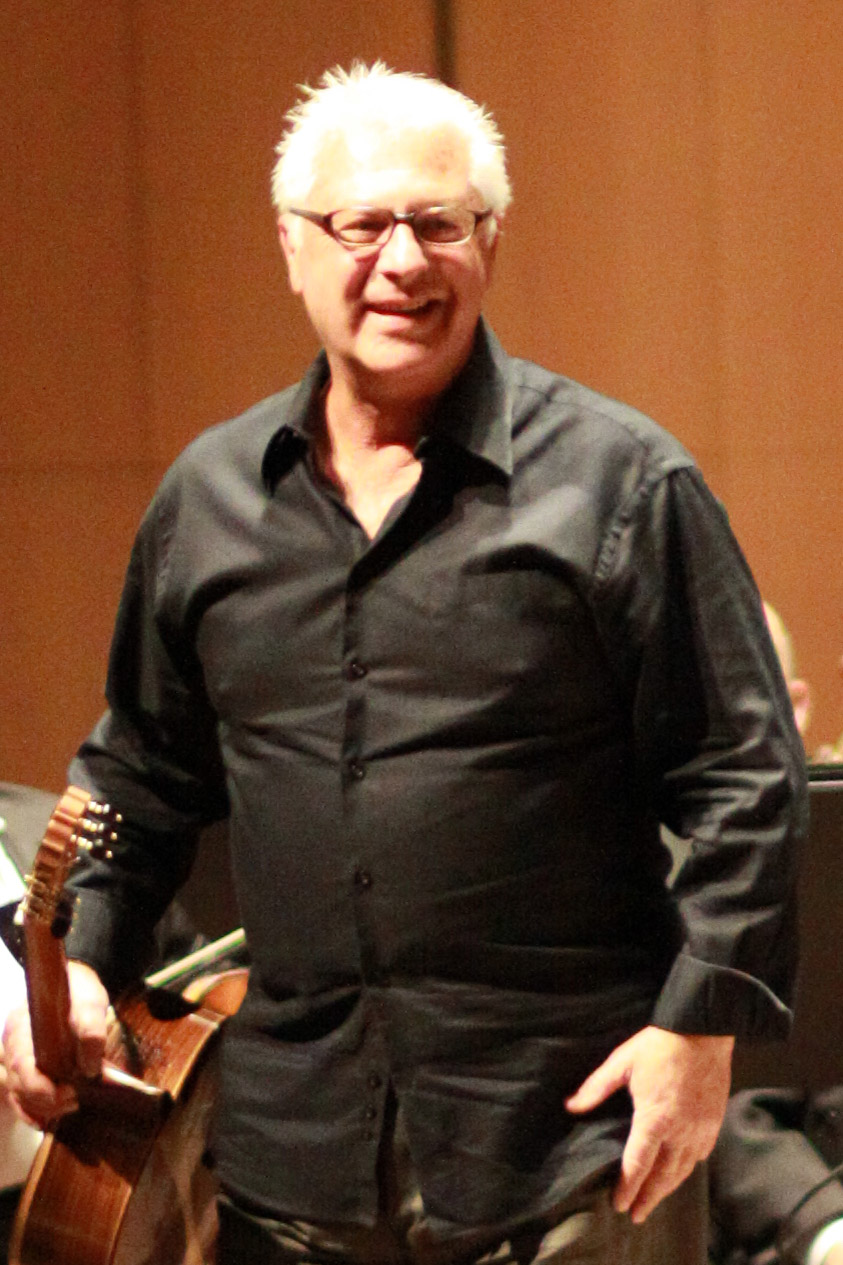

Background information
- Born: 17 August 1946 (age 79); Málaga, Spain
- Genres: Classical music
- Occupations: musician, composer, conductor
- Instrument: classical guitar
- Label: RCA Victor
- Website: angelromero.com

Angel Romero (born 17 August 1946) is a Spanish classical guitarist, conductor and former member of the guitar quartet Los Romeros. He is the youngest son of Celedonio Romero, who in 1957 left Spain for the United States with his family.

Romero made his professional debut at the age of six. At the age of sixteen, at his United States debut, he appeared as the Los Angeles Philharmonic's first guitar soloist, giving Joaquín Rodrigo's Concierto de Aranjuez its premiere for the US West Coast. He has studied conducting with Eugene Ormandy, the conductor of the Philadelphia Orchestra.

He has performed as a soloist with orchestras including the New York Philharmonic, the Cleveland Orchestra, the Royal Philharmonic, the New World Symphony, and the Royal Concertgebouw Orchestra. He has also conducted the Pittsburgh Symphony, the Academy of St Martin in the Fields, the Royal Philharmonic, Germany’s NDR Symphony Orchestra and the Berliner Symphoniker, the Beijing Philharmonic, the Euro-Asia Philharmonic, the Shanghai Symphony, the Bogotá Philharmonic, the Chicago Sinfonietta, the Orquesta de Baja California, the Santa Barbara Symphony, the San Diego Symphony and the San Diego Chamber Orchestra, among others. He has made highly acclaimed recordings for Delos International, RCA Victor Red Seal and RCA Victor Worldwide, Telarc and Angel/EMI (Angel/EMI recordings produced by Patti Laursen).

On 11 February 2000 at the USC Thornton School of Music, he and his brothers, Pepe and Celin, were each presented with the Grand Cross of Isabel la Catolica (the highest honour that can be offered in Spain), and were knighted for their musical accomplishments; the ceremony included a gala performance by The Romeros and the Thornton Chamber Orchestra.

In 2007, he was honoured by the Recording Academy, producer of the Grammy Awards, with the Recording Academy President’s Merit Award.

He has also been involved in the film industry. In 1989, he performed the score for The Milagro Beanfield War, directed by Robert Redford. In 1994, he composed and directed the musical score for Bienvenido-Welcome, a film by Gabriele Retes, for which he won the 1995 ARIEL (the "Academy Award" of Mexico). He also performed and recorded the score for By the Sword composed by Bill Conti, and played a cameo role in Bound by Honor, a Taylor Hackford film.

== Discography ==
- Concierto de Aranjuez and Fantasia para un Gentilhombre
- A Touch of Class: Popular Classics Transcribed for Guitar
- A Touch of Romance: Spanish & Latin Favorites Transcribed for Guitar
- Angel Romero Plays Bach: The Music of Bach Transcribed for Guitar
- Granados: Twelve Spanish Dances
- Vivaldi Concertos with the Academy of St Martin in the Fields
- Remembering the Future
- Romero/Rodrigo – Solo works for guitar
- Bella: The Incomparable Artistry of Angel Romero

== Bibliography ==
- Bella: The Incomparable Artistry of Angel Romero” instructional book

== Videography ==
- Angel Romero: The Art of Classical Guitar DVD
- Angel Romero, Virtuoso DVD

== Premieres ==
Date	Venue	Composer	Composition	Orchestra	Conductor
1986–11–07	Madrid	Lalo Schifrin	Guitar Concerto	Spanish National	Jesús López Cobos

== See also ==
The Romero Guitar Quartet

- 1960–90: Celedonio Romero, Celin Romero, Pepe Romero, Angel Romero
- 1990–96: Celedonio Romero, Celin Romero, Pepe Romero, Celino Romero
- since 1996: Celin Romero, Pepe Romero, Celino Romero, Lito Romero
