= The Romeros =

Spanish family guitar quartet

Los Romeros Guitar Quartet
- Origin: Spain, United States of America
- Genres: classical, flamenco
- Occupation: guitarist
- Instruments: classical guitar, flamenco guitar
- Years active: 1960–present
- Label: Mercury
- Members: Celin Romero, Pepe Romero, Celino Romero, Lito Romero
- Past members: Celedonio Romero, Angel Romero
- Website: https://web.archive.org/web/20070222133038/http://www.romeroguitarquartet.com/

Los Romeros, The Romero Guitar Quartet, is a guitar quartet, sometimes known as "The Royal Family of the Guitar" — their personnel consists entirely of members of the Romero family.

The quartet was founded in 1960 by Celedonio Romero, who grew up in Franco's Spain. He and his family emigrated to the United States in 1957. All three of his sons, Angel, Celin and Pepe, had made their performing debuts by the time they were seven. In 1957, the Romeros moved to the United States, where they continue to reside. In 1990 Angel left the quartet, and was replaced by Celin's son Celino. Celedonio Romero died in 1996, and was replaced by Angel's son Lito.

== Members ==
The Romero Guitar Quartet

- 1960–90: Celedonio Romero, Celin Romero, Pepe Romero, Angel Romero
- 1990–96: Celedonio Romero, Celin Romero, Pepe Romero, Celino Romero
- since 1996: Celin Romero, Pepe Romero, Celino Romero, Lito Romero

== See also ==
- Concierto Andaluz
