= Museu de la Música de Barcelona =

Music museum in Barcelona, Spain

Coordinates: 41.3983°N 2.1857°E

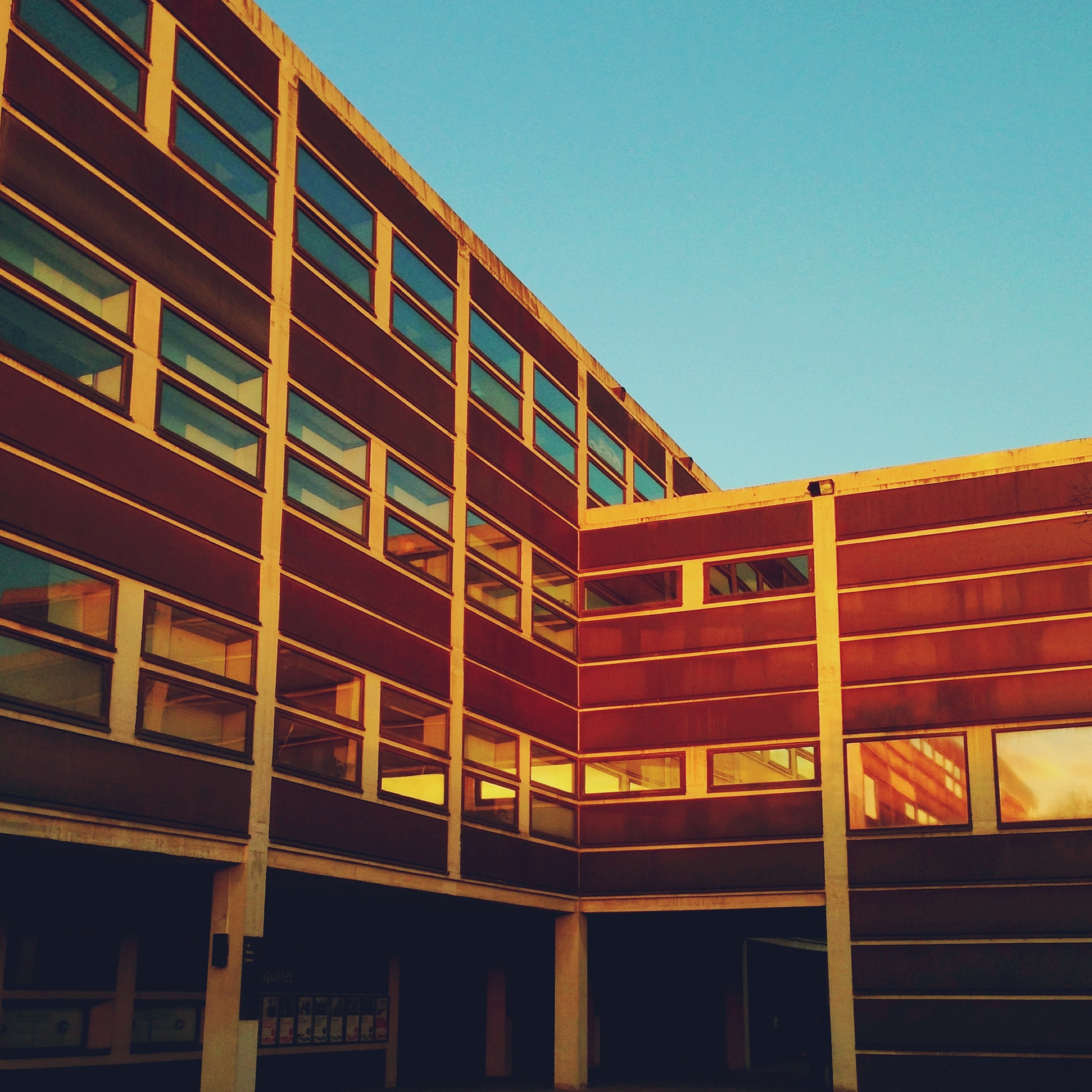
Façade of the Museu de la Música de Barcelona

The Museu de la Música de Barcelona (English: Music Museum of Barcelona) is a museum in Barcelona, Spain that houses a collection of musical instruments from around the world as well as biographical documents, from ancient civilisations to new technologies from the 21st century. The museum collection comprises 2000 musical instruments, 500 of which are on display, including one of the best guitar collections of the world. The museum covers historical, conservational and research aspects and promotes the city’s musical heritage.

The Museu de la Música is administered by the City Council. Since 2007 its headquarters are found on the second floor of the L'Auditori de Barcelona in the Fort Pienc neighbourhood.

== See also ==
- List of music museums
