= Celin Romero =

Classical guitarist (born 1936)

- Born: 1936 (age 89–90); Málaga, Spain
- Genres: Classical guitar
- Occupation: Guitarist
- Instrument: Guitar
- Member of: The Romeros

Celin Romero (born November 23, 1936, in Málaga) is a classical guitarist and member of the guitar quartet the Romeros. He is the eldest son of Celedonio Romero, who in 1957 left Spain for the United States with his family.

On February 11, 2000, at the USC Thornton School of Music, he and his brothers, Pepe and Angel, were each presented with the Grand Cross of Isabel la Catolica (the highest honour that can be offered in Spain), and were knighted for their musical accomplishments; the ceremony included a gala performance by The Romeros and the Thornton Chamber Orchestra.

In addition to his busy concert schedule, Romero is Professor of Music and Guitar at the University of California, San Diego.
