= Pepe Romero =

Spanish flamenco guitarist

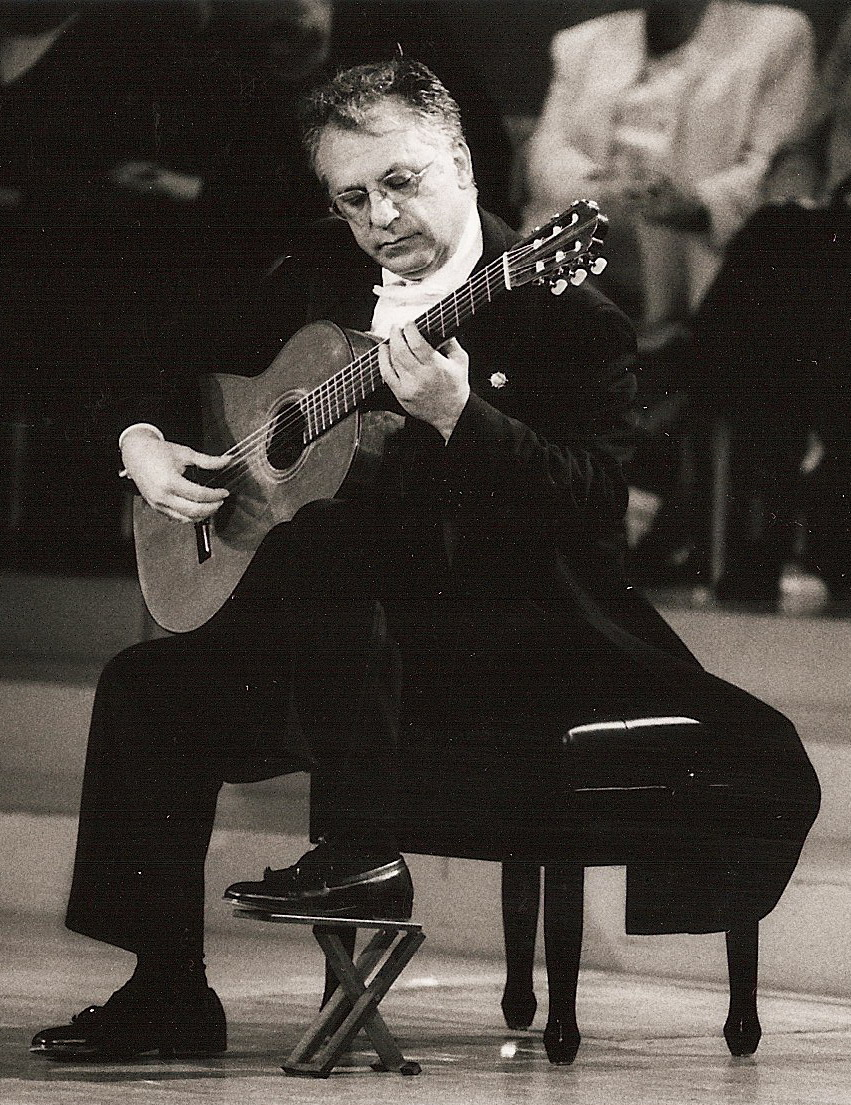
- Pepe Romero in 2000

Background information
- Born: March 8, 1944 (age 82); Málaga, Spain
- Genres: Classical music, flamenco
- Occupations: Guitarist, arranger
- Instrument: Guitar
- Years active: fl. ca. 1959 – present
- Label: Philips Records
- Member of: The Romero Guitar Quartet
- Website: www.peperomero.com

Pepe Romero (born 8 March 1944, in Málaga, Spain) is a classical and flamenco guitarist.

== Biography ==
=== Early life ===
Pepe Romero was born in Spain, the second son of celebrated guitarist and composer Celedonio Romero, who was his only guitar teacher. His first professional appearance was in a shared concert with his father at the Teatro Lope de Vega, Seville, when Pepe was only seven years old, playing a gavotte by Bach and Sevilla by Albéniz. In 1957 Celedonio Romero left Franco's Spain for the United States with his singer actress wife, Angelita, and his three sons, Celin, Pepe and Angel, settling in the San Diego area.

=== Teaching ===
Romero served as guitar professor at the University of Southern California, Southern Methodist University, University of San Diego and University of California at San Diego, before taking up the post of adjunct professor at USC Thornton School of Music.

Romero published a guitar method, La Guitarra, in 2012.

== Career ==
In 1959, Pepe made his first recording, featuring traditional flamenco music of his native Andalucia. At 16, he performed for the first time in Los Angeles, playing flamenco with his father and brothers Celin and Angel.

As a soloist Pepe Romero has appeared in the United States, Canada, Europe, China, the Middle-East, Japan, and Australia with, variously, the London, Toronto, Philadelphia, Cleveland, Chicago, Houston, Pittsburgh, Boston, San Francisco and Dallas symphony orchestras, as well as with the Orpheus Chamber Orchestra, the New York, Bogotá and Los Angeles philharmonic orchestras, the Boston Pops Orchestra, the Hong Kong Sinfonietta, the Academy of St Martin in the Fields, the Monte-Carlo Philharmonic Orchestra, I Musici, the Zurich Chamber Orchestra, the Philharmonia Hungarica, the Hungarian State Orchestra, the Spanish National Orchestra, the Spanish National Radio/Television Orchestra, the Orchestre de la Suisse Romande, the New Moscow Chamber Orchestra, the Springfield Symphony Orchestra, the Lausanne Chamber Orchestra, the American Sinfonietta, and the Bournemouth Symphony Orchestra. He has been a special guest at the festivals of Salzburg, Israel, Schleswig-Holstein, Menuhin, Osaka, Granada, Istanbul, Ravinia, Garden State, Hollywood Bowl, Blossom, Wolf Trap, Saratoga and Hong Kong.

Romero has recorded over 60 albums, including 20 concerti with the Academy of St Martin in the Fields, and 30 albums as part of the famed guitar quartet The Romeros. He has played for Presidents Carter and Nixon, the Queen of the Netherlands, the Prince of Wales and Pope John Paul II. He has numerous international recording awards to his credit and has received an Honorary Doctorate in Music from the University of Victoria, British Columbia, Canada.

His contributions to the field of classical guitar have inspired a number of distinguished composers to write works specifically for him, including Joaquín Rodrigo, Federico Moreno Torroba, Francisco de Madina, Lorenzo Palomo, Michael Zearott, Paul Chihara, Enrique Diemecke, Ernesto Cordero and Celedonio Romero. He was personally chosen by the legendary Andrés Segovia for the world premiere of Torroba's Diálogos entre guitarra y orquesta.

Of performing, Romero said,

Music makes us communicate through our soul, and if you can leave the theatre feeling that connection, that’s what I want more than anything.

Although originally a classical guitarist, he is talented in flamenco and a popular flamenco performer. His most famous flamenco-only album is called ¡Flamenco Fenómeno!

=== The Romero Guitar Quartet ===
- 1960–90: Celedonio Romero, Celin Romero, Pepe Romero, Angel Romero
- 1990–96: Celedonio Romero, Celin Romero, Pepe Romero, Celino Romero
- since 1996: Celin Romero, Pepe Romero, Celino Romero, Lito Romero

== Honors ==
For contribution to the arts, he received the Premio Andalucía de la Música in June 1996.

On February 11, 2000, King Juan Carlos I of Spain knighted Pepe Romero and his brothers, Celin and Angel, into the Order of Isabella the Catholic. The official ceremony of this high honor took place at the USC Thornton School of Music, and included a gala performance by The Romeros with the Thornton Chamber Orchestra. He is currently Adjunct Professor of Classical Guitar at the Thornton School, where he was named Distinguished Artist in Residence in 2004.

In 2007, the Romero Quartet received the President's Merit Award from the Recording Academy, the producers of the Grammy Awards, and, in November 2012, Romero's recording of Concierto festivo by Ernesto Cordero was nominated for Best Classical Album at the Latin Grammy Awards.

== Guitars ==
Initially, Romero shared his father’s Santos Hernandez. In 1958, he bought a Miguel Rodriguez from Córdoba, which he played until 1969. He then played a Hermann Hauser II before, in 1973, obtaining another Rodriguez, which was his principal instrument until at least 2014.

== Discography ==
=== Solo recordings or soloist with orchestra ===
No.	Album Title	Record label	Date	
01	¡Flamenco Fenomeno!	Contemporary	1959	
02	Flamenco!	Mercury	1962	
03	Giuliani Guitar Concerto, Op. 30, (Side A: Pepe Romero) Rodrigo: “Concierto Madrigal” for two guitars (Side B: Angel and Pepe Romero)(Academy of St. Martin-in-the-Fields, Neville Marriner)	Philips	1974	*
04	Rodrigo: “Fantasía para un gentilhombre”, Giuliani: Introduction, Theme with Variations and Polonaise, op. 65 (Pepe Romero, Academy of St. Martin-in-the-Fields, Neville Marriner)	Philips	1975	
05	Famous Guitar Music including Tárrega: "Recuerdos de la Alhambra"/Albéniz: "Asturias"/Villa Lobos/Lauro/Sagreras/Sor	Philips	1976	
06	Giuliani Guitar Concertos, Op.36 & Op.70 (Pepe Romero, Academy of St. Martin-in-the-Fields, Neville Marriner)	Philips	1976	
07	Mauro Giuliani: Guitar Concertos, Op.30, Op.36, Op.70, Op.65(Pepe Romero, Academy of St. Martin-in-the-Fields, Neville Marriner)	Philips	1976	
08	Works for Guitar from Renaissance to Baroque Sanz, Milán, Mudarra, Narváez, Pisador, Valderrábano	Philips	1976	
09	Giuliani: Handel Variations, op.107, Gran Sonata Eroica, etc.	Philips	1977	
10	Flamenco	Philips	1977	
11	Rodrigo: “Concierto de Aranjuez” (Side A: Pepe Romero); “Concierto Andaluz” (Side B: Los Romeros)(Academy of St. Martin-in-the-Fields, Neville Marriner)	Philips	1978	*
12	Sor: Guitar Sonatas/Gitarrensonaten Op.22 & 25	Philips	1978	
13	Boccherini Guitar Quintets Nos. 4,5 & 6 (Pepe Romero, Academy of St. Martin-in-the-Fields’ Chamber Ensemble)	Philips	1978	
14	Torroba: “Concierto Ibérico” (Side A: Los Romeros). “Diálogos” – (Side B: Pepe Romero side)	Philips	1979	*
15	Boccherini Guitar Quintets Nos. 3 & 9, “La ritirata di Madrid” (Pepe Romero, Academy of St. Martin-in-the-Fields’ Chamber Ensemble)	Philips	1979	
16	Boccherini Guitar Quintets Nos. 1,2 & 7 (Pepe Romero, Academy of St. Martin-in-the-Fields’ Chamber Ensemble)	Philips	1980	
17	Joaquín Rodrigo/Pepe Romero guitar (solo works)	Philips	1980	
18	Pepe Romero: Bach Partita BWV 1004 & Suite BWV 1009	Philips	1981	
19	Carulli 2 Sonatas Diabelli Sonata Op. 68, Grande Sonate brilliante Op. 102 (Pepe Romero, Wilhelm Hellweg, forte piano)	Philips	1982	
20	Jeux Interdits, Recuerdos de la Alhambra, Asturias	Philips	1982	
21	Rodrigo: “Concierto para una fiesta” Romero/Torroba:“Concierto de Málaga” (Pepe Romero, Academy of St. Martin-in-the-Fields, Neville Marriner)	Philips	1983	
22	Villa-Lobos, Castelnuovo-Tedesco Guitar Concertos, Rodrigo: “Sones en la Giralda” (Pepe Romero, Academy of St. Martin-in-the-Fields, Neville Marriner)	Philips	1985	
23	Pepe Romero Guitar: Albéniz/Tárrega/Moreno Torroba/Romero	Philips	1985	
24	Villa-Lobos: Five Preludes, Etude No.1, Suite populaire brésilienne	Philips	1987	
25	Pepe Romero: Flamenco – Chano Lobato, Maria Magdalena, Paco Romero	Philips	1987	
26	Carulli, Molino: Guitar Concertos, Mozart: Adagio KV 261, Rondo KV373 (Pepe Romero, Academy of St. Martin-in-the-Fields, Iona Brown)	Philips	1989	
27	La Paloma: Spanish and Latin American Favorites	Philips	1990	
28	Vivaldi Guitar Concertos I Musici, Pepe Romero, Massimo Paris	Philips	1991	
29	Rodrigo: Concierto de Aranjuez, Fantasía de un gentilhombre, Cançoneta, Invocación y danza, Trois petites piéces(ASMF, N. Marriner, Agustin Leon Ara)(“Shadows and Light: Rodrigo at 90”, a film by Larry Weinstein and Rhombus Media)(released also as a CD, Laser CD-Video disc and VHS cassette)	Philips	1992	**
30	Noches de España: Romantic Guitar Classics-World premiere recording Sor Fantasie	Philips	1993	
31	Opera Fantasy for Guitar:	Philips	1995	
32	Songs My Father Taught Me	Philips	1998	
33	Boccherini: Quintetti con chitarra n.2,6,7,4(Pepe Romero with Quartetto Stadivari)	UNICEF	1998	
34	Palomo: Andalusian Nocturnes, Spanish Songs (Pepe Romero, guitar, Maria Bayo, soprano. Seville Royal Symphony Orchestra, Rafael Frühbeck de Burgos)	NAXOS	2000	
35	Homenatge a Montsalvatge Metamorfosi de concert (Pepe Romero, Orquesta de Cadaqués, Gianandrea Noseda)	Tritó	2002	
36	Corazón Español	CPA Hollywood Records	2003	
37	Chihara: Guitar Concerto (Pepe Romero, London Symphony, Neville Marriner)	Albany Records	2004	
38	Giuliani: Guitar Concert No.1, Rodrigo: Concierto Madrigal. Re-release 2004 on super audio CD (original release 1974)	PentaTone	2004	
39	The Art of Pepe Romero (compilation)	Philips	200?	
40	The Rodrigo Collection(Re-release 2005 – CD/DVD including “Shadows and Light” film)	Philips	2005	**
41	Classic Romero	CPA Hollywood Records	2005	
42	Guitarrenmusik: Bach, Sor. (Re-release on CD)	Philips Classics/Eloquence Label	200?	
43	Recuerdos de la Alhambra: Spanishe Gitarrenmusik-Pepe Romero, Los Romeros	Philips Classics/Eloquence Label	200?	**
44	Aita Madina (Concierto vasco para 4 guitarras y orquesta Euskadiko Orkestra Sinfonikoa/Los Romero / Mandeal	Claves	2005	**

* albums where one side of the album was Pepe Romero and the second side was Los Romeros
** albums that were mainly Pepe Romero with some involvement of the rest of Los Romeros

=== Pepe Romero with Los Romeros ===
No.	Album Title	Record label	Date
01	The Royal Family of the Spanish Guitar	Mercury	1962
02	The Romeros: Spain's Royal Family of the Guitar; Baroque Concertos and Solo Works	Mercury	1965
03	An Evening of Flamenco Music: The Romeros; The Royal Family of the Spanish Guitar	Mercury	1965
04	The Romeros: The World of Flamenco	Mercury	1967
05	Los Romeros: Die Könige der Spanischen Gitarre	Mercury	1967
06	The Romeros: Spain's Royal Family of the Guitar; Vivaldi Guitar Concertos (San Antonio Symphony, V. Alessandro)	Mercury	1968
07	Rodrigo: First Recording: “Concierto Andaluz” for four guitars and orchestra, (Side A: the Romeros); “Concierto de Aranjuez” for solo guitar and orchestra, (Side B: Angel Romero)(San Antonio Symphony, V. Alessandro)	Mercury	1968
08	The Romeros Play Classical Music for Four Guitars	Philips	1976
09	Los Romeros-Telemann/Bach/D. Scarlatti/Loeillet/Dowland	Philips	1977
10	Rodrigo: “Concierto de Aranjuez”, Pepe Romero; “Concierto Andaluz”, Los Romeros (Academy of St. Martin-in-the-Fields, Neville Marriner)	Philips	1978
11	Joaquín Rodrigo: “Concierto Madrigal” “Concierto Andaluz”, Los Romeros(Academy of St. Martin-in-the-Fields, N. Marriner. Re-release	Philips	
12	Torroba: “Concierto Ibérico” - Los Romeros, “Diálogos” – Pepe Romero First recording	Philips	1979
13	Vivaldi Guitar Concertos, Los Romeros(Academy of St. Martin-in-the-Fields, Iona Brown)	Philips	1984
14	Bizet Carmen Suite – Falla Dances, Moreno Torroba Sonata - Los Romeros	Philips	1984
15	Rodrigo: Concierto de Aranjuez, Fantasía de un gentilhombre, Cançoneta, Invocación y danza, Trois petites piéces(ASMF, N. Marriner, Agustin Leon Ara)(“Shadows and Light: Rodrigo at 90”, a film by Larry Weinstein and Rhombus Media)(released also as a CD, Laser CD-Video disc and VHS cassette)	Philips	1992
16	Los Romeros: Spanish Guitar Favorites (Celedonio, Celin, Pepe, Celino Romero)		1993
17	The Romeros: Generations	CPA Hollywood Records	2000
18	Homenaje a Joaquín Rodrigo-Los Romero con Orquesta Sinfónica de RTVE(Recorded 1997, live performance at the Alhambra)	RTVE	1997
19	Recuerdos de la Alhambra: Spanishe Gitarrenmusik (Pepe Romero, Los Romeros) Re-release on CD	Philips	
20	Aita Madina (Concierto vasco para 4 guitarras y orquesta. Euskadiko Orkestra Sinfonikoa/Los Romero / Mandeal	Clavess	2005
21	Los Romeros: Golden Jubilee Celebration. 50th Anniversary re-release	DECCA	200?
22	The Romeros: Celebration	RCA RED Seal/SONY	2008

== Publications ==
- Pepe Romero: Dialogues on a Life's Journey with the Guitar (with Walter Aaron Clark, 2025). Boydell & Brewer.
