= Regino Sainz de la Maza =

Spanish classical guitarist and composer (1896 – 1981)

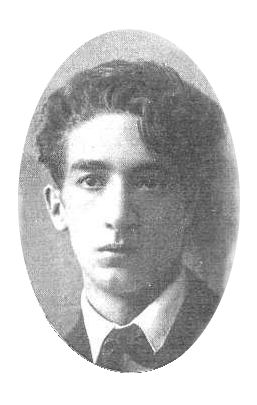
Regino Sainz de la Maza

Regino Sainz de la Maza y Ruiz (7 September 1896 – 26 November 1981) was a Spanish classical guitarist and composer.

== Biography ==
Sainz de la Maza was born in Burgos. At ten, he got his first guitar and started his musical studies with Santiago Landache (solfege), José Nicolás Quesada (piano), and Eugenio Rodríguez Pascual (guitar). In 1910, his family moved to San Sebastián, where he studied piano with Germán Cendoya, harmony with Beltrán Pagola and guitar with Luis Soria. A year later, he moved to Bilbao, where he continued his studies with Hilarión Leloup. At 18, he performed at his first concert at the Teatro Arriaga of Bilbao.

He later moved to Barcelona, where he worked as a concert musician. There, he befriended Miguel Llobet and Andrés Segovia. In 1920, he played for the first time in Madrid. A year later, he toured South America, giving 90 concerts. On 20 May 1920, he was awarded a Golden Medal by the University of Buenos Aires, where he became friends with composer Antonio José Martínez Palacios, who dedicated some guitar compositions to Sainz de la Maza.

He toured Europe, giving concerts in France in 1926, in Germany in 1927 and Great Britain in 1928. Five years later, he toured South America for the second time, with concerts in Uruguay, Argentina, and Brazil.

On 19 December 1930, he married Josefina de la Serna, daughter of the writer Concha Espina, at the Real Basílica de Monasterio de El Escorial. In 1935, he was named professor of guitar at the Madrid Royal Conservatory. On 6 November 1940, he played the guitar at the premiere of Joaquín Rodrigo's Concierto de Aranjuez in Barcelona, conducted by César Mendoza Lasalle. Rodrigo dedicated the Concierto de Aranjuez to Regino Sainz de la Maza. On 11 December 1940 he played the concerto in Madrid, with Jesús Arámbarri as conductor. In 1955 he published the book called La Guitarra y su historia ('The Guitar and its History'). On 23 May 1958, he became a member of the Academy of Fine Arts of San Fernando of Madrid. A day later, he was named a favourite son of the city of Burgos.

Sainz de la Maza performed for the last time at the Church of San Nicola di Bari in Italy, on 9 July 1979, aged 82. He died in Madrid two years later. His younger brother Eduardo Sainz de la Maza (1903–1982) was also an acclaimed guitarist and composer.

== Selected compositions ==
Guitar solo

- Alegrías Danza (Madrid: Union Musical Española, 1933)
- Cuatro obras originales (Madrid: Union Musical Española, 1955). Contains: Baile de Muñecas; Meditacion; Recuerdo; Minueto.
- El Vito (nueva version) (Madrid: Union Musical Española, 1962)
- Rondeña (Madrid: Union Musical Española, 1962)
- Zapateado (Madrid: Union Musical Española, 1962)
