= Victoria Kamhi =

Turkish pianist

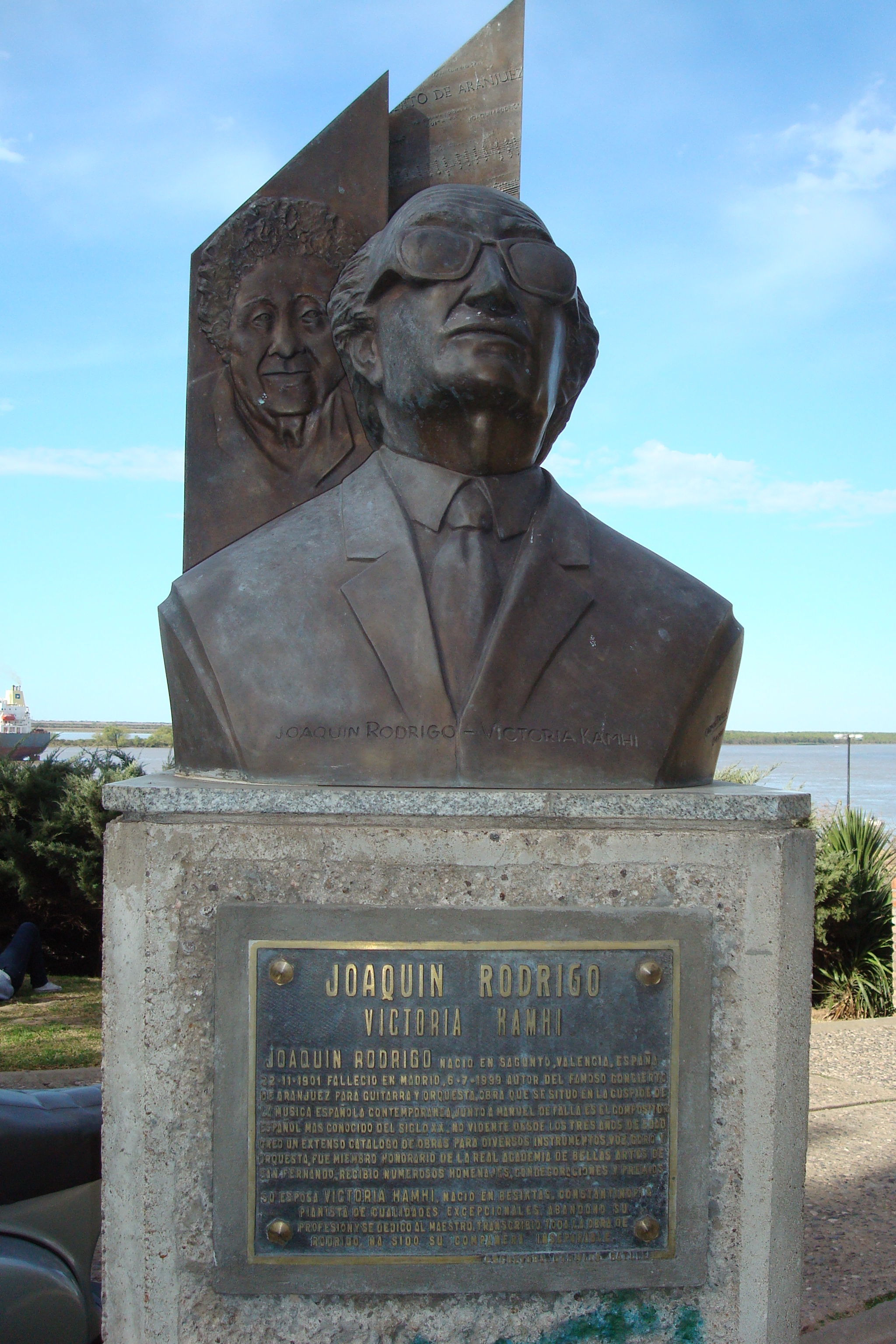
Kamhi depicted in the background of a bust of Joaquín Rodrigo. España Park, Rosario, Santa Fe Province, Argentina.

Victoria Kamhi de Rodrigo (1905, Istanbul, Ottoman Empire – 21 July 1997) was a Turkish pianist of Sephardic Jewish heritage, and the wife of the Spanish composer Joaquín Rodrigo.

== Biography ==
Kamhi studied under Lalewicz, Lévy and Viñes. She met Rodrigo in 1929, and they were married on 19 January 1933. They lived in France and Germany before returning to Spain in 1939.

Kamhi left her career as a pianist. She was a notable assistant to Rodrigo, who was blind, and she wrote a biographical work called De la mano de Joaquín Rodrigo: Historia de nuestra vida. It has been translated into English as Hand in Hand with Joaquín Rodrigo: My Life at the Maestro's Side.

Kamhi's only child with Rodrigo was Cecilia, who was born in January 1941. Cecilia later married the violinist Agustín León Ara, and they had children Cecilia and Patricia.

Victoria Kamhi died in 1997; she and her husband are both buried in Aranjuez.
