= Fantasía para un gentilhombre =

Guitar concerto by Joaquín Rodrigo

Fantasía para un gentilhombre (Fantasia for a Gentleman) is a concerto for guitar and orchestra by the Spanish composer Joaquín Rodrigo. The concerto is Rodrigo's most popular work after the famous Concierto de Aranjuez.

The four movements were based on six short dances for solo guitar by the 17th-century Spanish composer Gaspar Sanz and were taken from a three-volume work (1674, 1675, 1697) that is now commonly known as Instrucción de música sobre la guitarra española (Musical Instruction on the Spanish Guitar) (Donis 2005:75). Most of the movements retain the names that were originally given by Sanz.

Rodrigo composed the concerto in 1954 at the request of the guitarist Andrés Segovia, who was evidently the gentilhombre referenced in the title. Segovia took the solo part at the premiere performance on March 5, 1958, in San Francisco. The San Francisco Symphony was conducted by Enrique Jordá.

In addition to the solo guitar, the concerto is scored for an orchestra consisting of a piccolo, a flute, an oboe, a bassoon, a trumpet in C, and strings.

== Movements ==
The four movements are:

1. Villano y ricercar
2. Españoleta y fanfarria de la caballería de Nápoles
3. Danza de las hachas
4. Canario

The first movement opens with the melodic Villano that passes back and forth between the solo guitarist and the orchestra repeatedly. This is the form of the other movements of the work. The music also hints subtly at themes used in the subsequent movements. The second part of the first movement, called Ricercare, is a short piece contrasting with Villano and entirely based on a two-bar phrase, repeated in the form of a complex fugue or ricercare.

The second movement returns to a more lyrical theme with the Españoleta, which has a particularly haunting tune with rich accompaniment of the strings. The contrasting middle section of this movement, Fanfare de la Cabellería de Nápoles (Fanfare for the Cavalry of Naples), brings in rapid, discordant drum beats along with the accompaniment of the guitar and spectral fanfares for trumpet and flute. The Españoleta is then reprised to conclude the movement.

The third movement, Danza de las Hachas (Dance of the Axes), has an energetic dance beat, largely supported by a crescendo from the orchestra. This lively, short movement is in effect an interlude linking the more mournful part of the Fantasía with the more up-beat final movement.

Finally, the fourth movement, Canario, brings in music that Sanz wrote in the style of a folk dance originating in the Canary Islands. Rodrigo pays homage to the music's origins by imitating a bird call toward the end of the movement even though the Canary Islands were so named because of the wild dogs prevalent there (canis) and not because of birds (canaries). The movement was covered by Emerson, Lake & Palmer for their 1978 album Love Beach.

== See also ==
- Spanish guitar
