= Christopher Parkening =

American classical guitarist (born 1947)

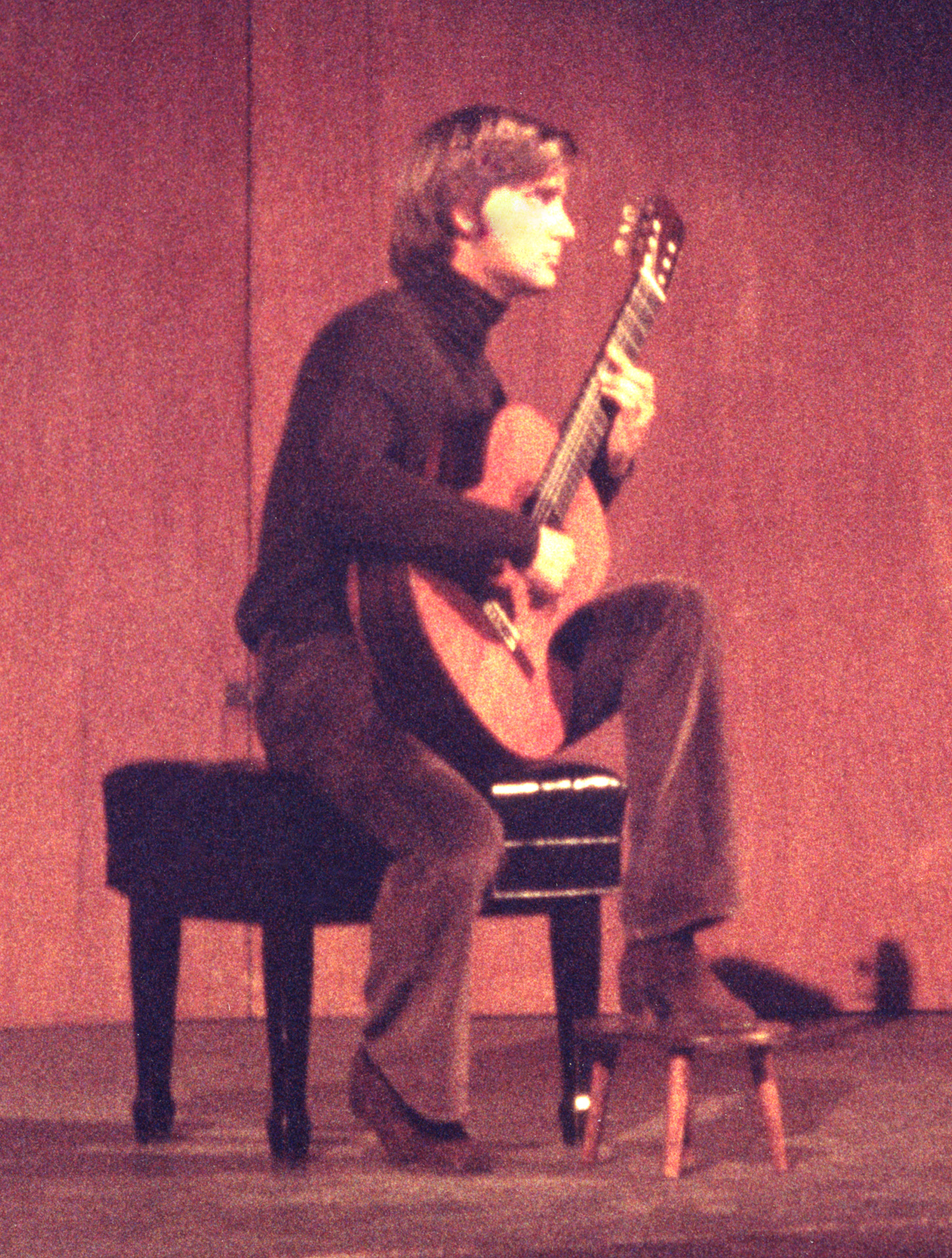
- Parkening in concert, 1975

Background information
- Born: December 14, 1947 (age 78); Los Angeles, California, U.S.
- Genres: Classical
- Occupation: Musician
- Instrument: Classical guitar
- Labels: Capitol, EMI, Angel
- Website: www.parkening.com

Christopher William Parkening (born December 14, 1947) is an American classical guitarist. He holds the Chair of Classical Guitar at Pepperdine University under the title Distinguished Professor of Music.

== Biography ==
Parkening was born in Los Angeles, California. His cousin Jack Marshall, a studio musician active in the 1960s, introduced Parkening to the recordings of Andrés Segovia when he was 11 and encouraged his classical guitar studies. By the age of 19 he had embarked on a professional career of regular touring and recording.

Segovia has stated that, "Christopher Parkening is a great artist—-he is one of the most brilliant guitarists in the world." The Washington Post stated, Christopher Parkening is “the leading guitar virtuoso of our day, combining profound musical insight with complete technical mastery of his instrument.”

At age 30, Parkening withdrew from public performances and recording seeking a respite from the demands of a professional career and a chance to pursue his hobby of flyfishing. During this period Parkening rarely played guitar, choosing instead to focus his attention on his Montana ranch and trout stream. While visiting his Southern California home in winter, a neighbor invited Parkening to the Grace Community Church. Profoundly affected by this experience Parkening returned to recording and performing with a renewed sense of purpose" to glorify God with his music. He then released Simple Gifts, an album of traditional Christian hymns arranged for classical guitar. His autobiography Grace Like a River was published in 2006.

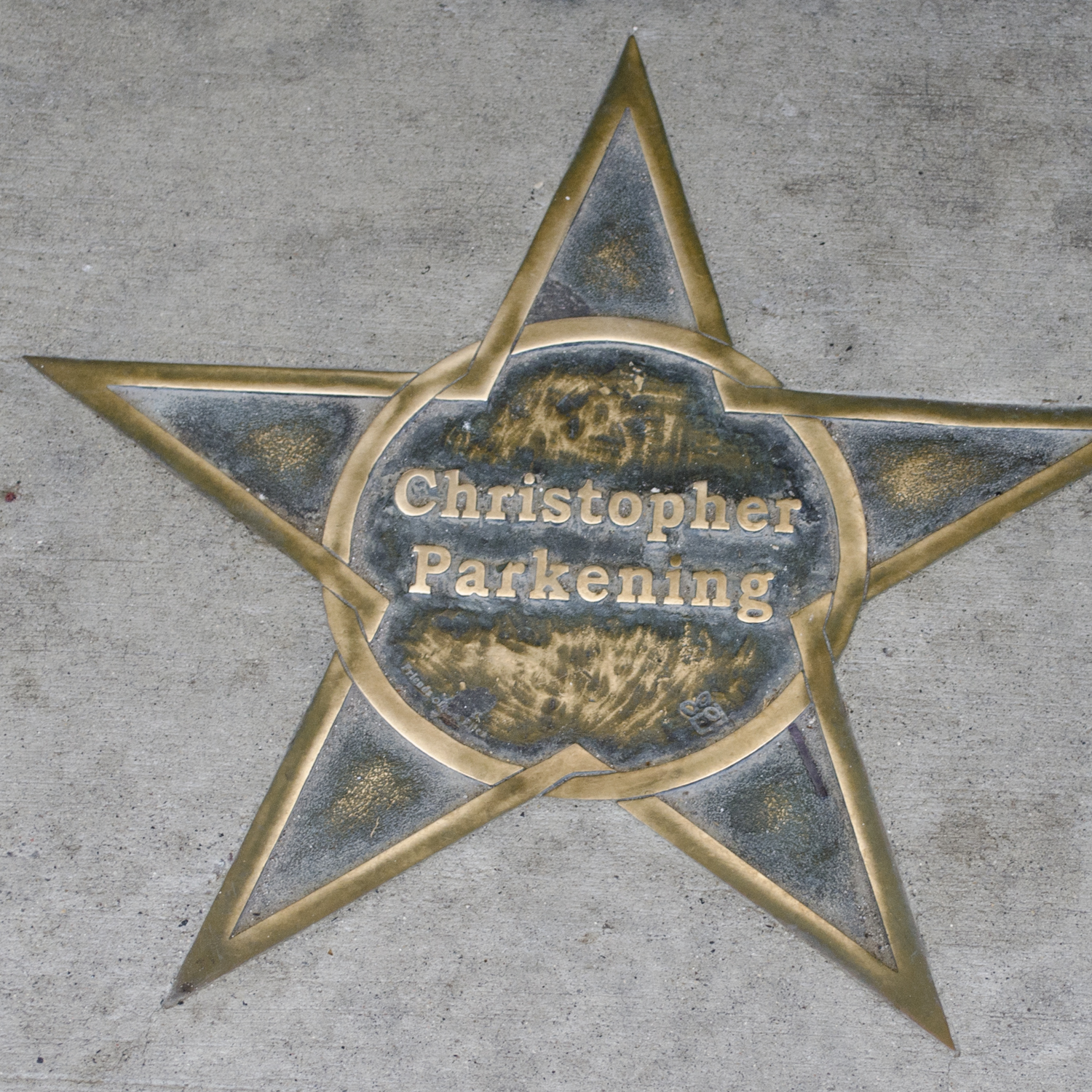
Star in honor of Parkening, on the sidewalk outside the Ellen Theater in Bozeman, Montana

Parkening has recorded over 20 albums for Angel and EMI Classics. He has been nominated twice for a Grammy Award. Notable recordings include Parkening Plays Vivaldi featuring a selection of Baroque concertos, Pleasures of Their Company with soprano Kathleen Battle, produced by Patti Laursen and nominated for the 1986 Classical Record of the Year Grammy Award as well as the world premiere recording of Peter Warlock's Capriol Suite with the Academy of St Martin in the Fields.

As an educator, Parkening has been instrumental in cementing the guitar's reputation and esteem within academia. He created the guitar department at the University of Southern California in 1969, when he was 22, and he was the head of the department when he first retired from public performance at age 30. During his sabbatical from the guitar, spent mostly fly-fishing in Montana, he agreed to found a guitar department at Montana State University, and he did what he calls a "token" amount of teaching at MSU during this time. He was awarded an Honorary Doctor of Music from Montana State University in 1983. He is currently Distinguished Professor of Music and Chair in Classical Guitar at Pepperdine University, where, in addition to his work with guitar majors, he also teaches a public master class. In a 2013 interview, Parkening said that he is retired from the concert stage and is focused on his family and teaching.

== Discography ==
=== LP ===
- In the Classic Style (1968), Angel
- In the Spanish Style (1968), Angel
- Romanza (1969), Angel
- Parkening Plays Bach (1972), Angel
- The Christopher Parkening Album (1973), Angel
- Parkening and the Guitar (1976), Angel (nominated for a Grammy® Award for "Best Classical Album of the Year")

=== CD ===
- Simple Gifts (1982), EMI/Angel
- A Bach Celebration with the Los Angeles Chamber Orchestra (1985), EMI/Angel
- Christopher Parkening Plays Bach (1985), EMI/Angel
- Pleasures of Their Company with Kathleen Battle (1986), EMI/Angel (Nominated for a Grammy® Award for "Best Classical Recording")
- In the Spanish Style (1986), EMI/Angel
- Virtuoso Duets with David Brandon (1990), EMI/Angel
- The Sounds of Christmas with Julie Andrews (1990), Hallmark Cards, Inc.
- A Tribute to Segovia (1991), EMI/Angel
- The Artistry of Christopher Parkening (1993), EMI/Angel
- The Great Recordings (1993), EMI/Angel
- Rodrigo: Concierto de Aranjuez; Walton: 5 Bagatelles with Andrew Litton and the Royal Philharmonic Orchestra (1993), EMI/Angel
- Christopher Parkening Plays Vivaldi Guitar Concertos & Warlock Capriol Suite (1994), EMI/Angel
- Angels' Glory with Kathleen Battle (1996), Sony Classical
- Christopher Parkening Celebrates Segovia (1998), EMI/Angel
- Stepmom film score with John Williams (1998), Sony Classical
- Elmer Bernstein – Concerto for Guitar – Albeniz – Marshall (2000), EMI/Angel
- Grace Like A River (2006), EMI/Angel
- Jubilation (2007) with Jubilant Sykes, EMI/Angel Records

=== DVD ===
- Virtuoso Performances (2008), Hal Leonard Corp.
