= Concierto de Aranjuez =

Classical guitar concerto by Joaquín Rodrigo (1939)

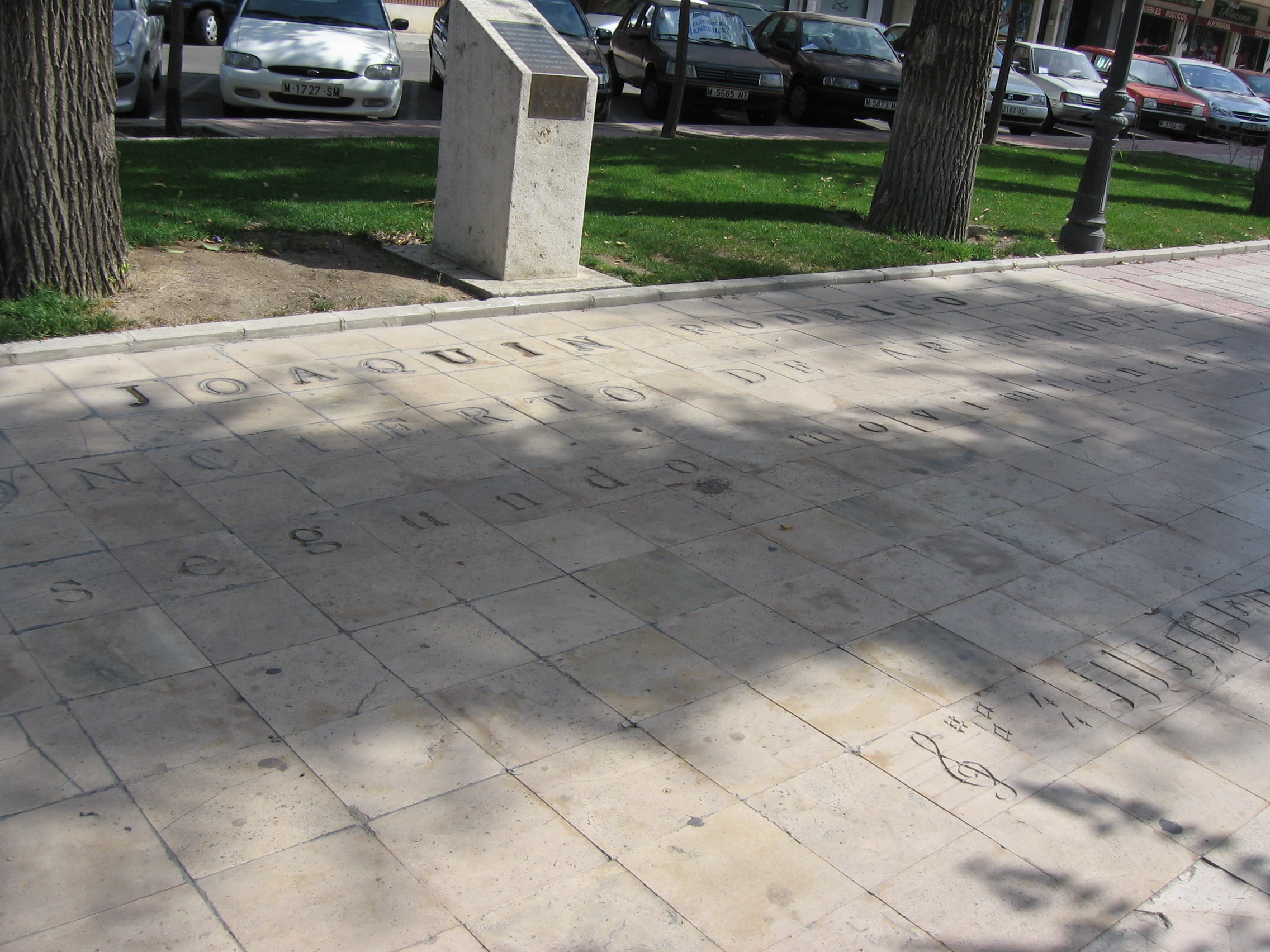
Monument devoted to Joaquín Rodrigo's Concierto on a sidewalk in the city of Aranjuez

The Concierto de Aranjuez (Spanish pronunciation: [konˈθjeɾto ðe aɾaŋˈxweθ]; "Aranjuez Concerto") is a concerto for classical guitar by the Spanish composer Joaquín Rodrigo. Written in 1939, it is by far Rodrigo's best-known work, and its success established his reputation as one of the most significant Spanish composers of the 20th century.

== Inspiration and history ==
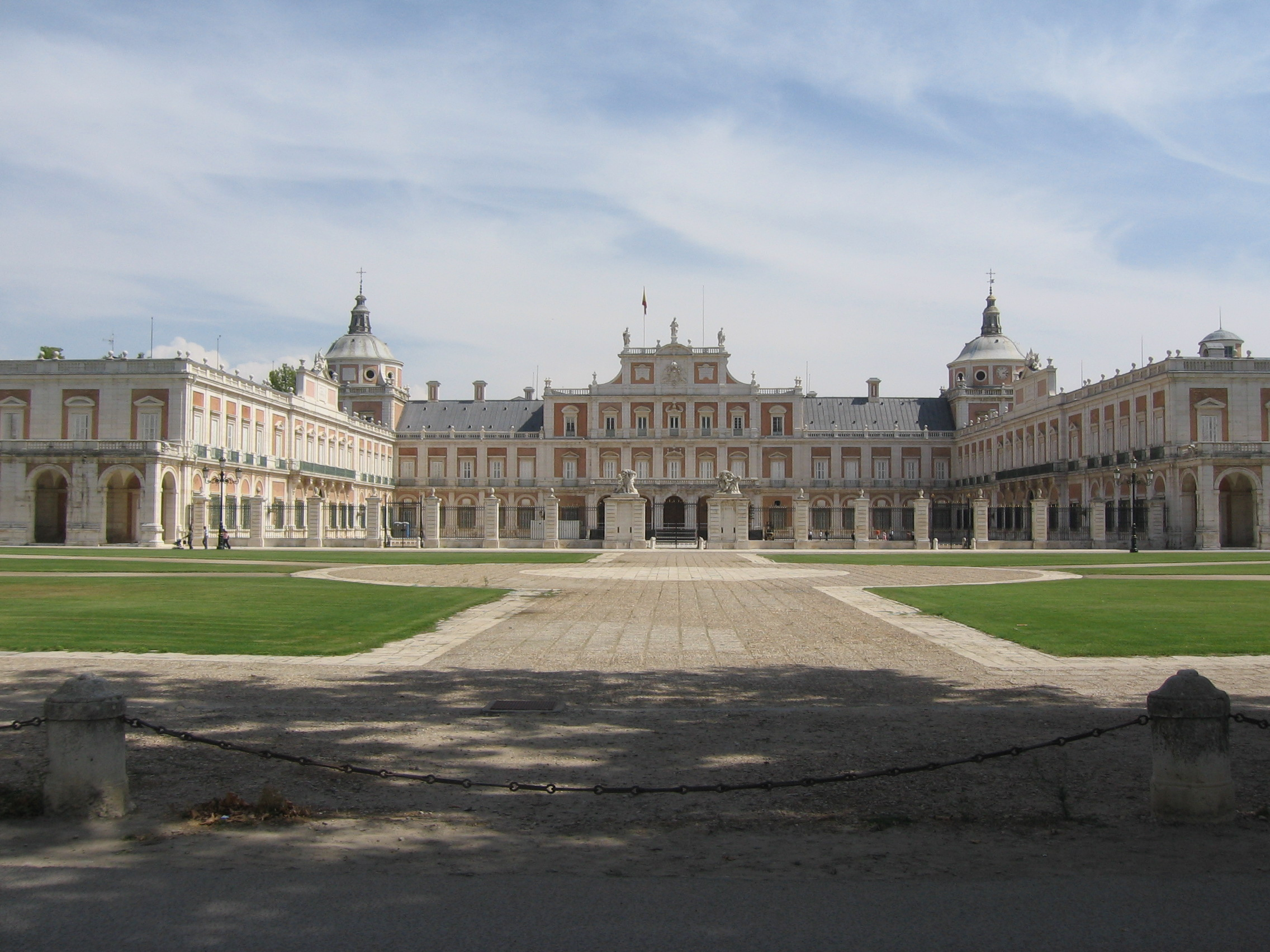
Royal Palace of Aranjuez (c. 2006)

The Concierto de Aranjuez was inspired by the gardens at the Royal Palace of Aranjuez, the spring resort palace and gardens built by Philip II in the last half of the 16th century and rebuilt in the middle of the 18th century by Ferdinand VI. The work attempts to transport the listener to another place and time through the evocation of the sounds of nature.

According to the composer, the first movement is "animated by a rhythmic spirit and vigour without either of the two themes ... interrupting its relentless pace"; the second movement "represents a dialogue between classical guitar and solo instruments (cor anglais, bassoon, oboe, horn, etc.)"; and the last movement "recalls a courtly dance in which the combination of double and triple time maintains a taut tempo right to the closing bar." He described the concerto itself as capturing "the fragrance of magnolias, the singing of birds, and the gushing of fountains" in the gardens of Aranjuez.

Rodrigo and his wife Victoria stayed silent for many years about the inspiration for the second movement, and thus the popular belief grew that it was inspired by the bombing of Guernica in 1937. In her autobiography, Victoria eventually declared that it was both an evocation of the happy days of their honeymoon and a response to Rodrigo's devastation at the miscarriage of their first pregnancy. It was composed in 1939 in Paris.

Rodrigo dedicated the Concierto de Aranjuez to Regino Sainz de la Maza.

Rodrigo, nearly blind since age three, was a pianist. He did not play the guitar, yet he still managed to capture and project the role of the guitar in Spanish music.

=== Composition ===
Composed in early 1939, in Paris, amid the end of the Spanish Civil War and the tensions of the impending Second World War, it was the first work Rodrigo wrote for guitar and orchestra.

=== Premiere ===
The premiere of the Concierto de Aranjuez was held on 9 November 1940 at the Palau de la Música Catalana, in Barcelona. It was performed by guitarist Regino Sainz de la Maza with the Orquesta Filarmónica de Barcelona conducted by César Mendoza Lasalle.

On 11 December 1940, the concerto received its first performance in Madrid, at the Teatro Español de Madrid, conducted by Jesús Arámbarri, with the same soloist. The United States premiere was given by José Rey de la Torre on 19 November 1959, with the Cleveland Orchestra conducted by Robert Shaw.

== Structure ==
This concerto is in three movements:

1. Allegro con spirito
2. Adagio
3. Allegro gentile

The first and last movements are in D major, while the famous middle movement is in B minor.

Along with the solo guitar, it is scored for an orchestra consisting of two flutes (one doubling on piccolo), two oboes (one doubling on cor anglais), two clarinets in B♭, two bassoons, two horns in F, two trumpets in C, and strings.

=== I. Allegro con spirito ===
The first movement's 40-measure introduction begins with the solo guitar strumming a three-measure theme in 6/8. The theme is made of tonic, supertonic, and dominant chords and features a flamenco-like hemiola rhythm. As it repeats several times, the tonic chord's uppermost note gets higher, starting with the third, then using the fifth, the tonic, and the fifth again.

Introduction (guitar)

1st theme (1st oboe and 1st violins)

2nd theme (guitar, D major to E♭ major)

=== II. Adagio ===
The second movement in B minor, the best-known of the three, is marked by its slow pace and quiet melody, introduced by the cor anglais, with a soft accompaniment by the guitar and strings. A feeling of quiet regret permeates the piece. Ornamentation is added gradually to the melody in the beginning. An off-tonic trill in the guitar creates the first seeds of tension in the piece; they grow and take hold, but relax back to the melody periodically. Eventually, a climactic build-up starts. This breaks back into the main melody, molto appassionato, voiced by the strings with accompaniment from the woodwinds. The piece finally resolves to a calm arpeggio from the guitar, though it is the strings in the background rather than the guitar's final note that resolve the piece.

Introduction (guitar, B minor)

Theme (cor anglais)

=== III. Allegro gentile ===
The third movement is in mixed metre, alternating between 2/4 and 3/4. At the beginning of the movement, four-measure phrases containing 9 beats in total are formed from one 3/4 measure followed by three 2/4 measures. As the movement progresses, the metre becomes more irregular. It begins with the guitar starting the theme in the "wrong" key of B major, but the orchestra restates it in the home key of D major.

Theme (guitar, B major)

== Interpretations ==
The Concierto de Aranjuez was recorded for the first time in either 1947 or 1948 by guitarist Regino Sainz de la Maza with the Orquesta Nacional de España, conducted by Ataúlfo Argenta, on 78 rpm records. This recording was inducted into the Latin Grammy Hall of Fame. Narciso Yepes then made two early recordings of the concerto, both also with Argenta – one in mono with the Madrid Chamber Orchestra (released between 1953 and 1955), and the second in stereo with the Orquesta Nacional de España (recorded in 1957 and released in 1959). Although Ida Presti gave the French premiere of the Concierto de Aranjuez in 1948, the first female classical guitarist to record the concerto was Renata Tarragó (1958 or 1959) – who played with fingertips rather than fingernails – accompanied by the Orquesta de Conciertos de Madrid, conducted by Odón Alonso. William Yeoman provides a discographical survey of recordings of the concerto in Gramophone magazine. Due to his extremely lengthy recording career, Julian Bream had ample room to record the Concierto de Aranjuez five times. Four of those recordings appeared on record albums and one was recorded on film for the final segment of the film series ¡Guitarra! A Musical Journey Through Spain. Each time, Julian Bream used a different combination of orchestra and conductor. Charo has played the Concerto in concert and for an album.

Until asked to perform and interpret Concierto de Aranjuez in 1991, the Spanish flamenco guitarist Paco de Lucía was not proficient at reading musical notation, and José María Gallardo Del Rey advised and directed him musically. De Lucía claimed in Paco de Lucía-Light and Shade: A Portrait that he gave greater emphasis to rhythmical accuracy in his interpretation of the concerto at the expense of the perfect tone preferred by classical guitarists. Composer Joaquín Rodrigo later declared that no one had ever played his composition in such a brilliant manner.

At the request of Nicanor Zabaleta, Rodrigo transcribed the concerto for harp and orchestra in 1974.

Jazz trumpeter Miles Davis reinterpreted the second movement of the work on his album Sketches of Spain (1960), in the company of arranger Gil Evans. Davis stated, "That melody is so strong that the softer you play it, the stronger it gets, and the stronger you play it, the weaker it gets." Columbia Records, the label that released Sketches of Spain, had not asked the composer for permission to record or adapt his music, and Rodrigo did not learn of the recording until after its release in 1960, when the blind jazz pianist Tete Montoliu, who claimed to have been the first person in Spain to own a copy of the album, played it for the maestro and his family. Rodrigo was irate that the American record label had used his music without permission. Aside from the fact that he, as the composer, had not been asked for permission, which he considered "a violation of moral rights", Rodrigo also tried to block the jazz and pop recordings from being released. "In the end, the composer resigned himself to accept the fact that the pop versions reached a far greater public than that of classical music concertgoers, and led to much wider recognition of the original classical concerto for guitar and orchestra, Concierto de Aranjuez." In fact, "Rodrigo changed his mind and came to accept the subsequent jazz recordings of his music in part because the legal terms of use were resolved (Ediciones Joaquín Rodrigo now owns the Gil Evans arrangement), but also in part because these versions, far from obliterating the original guitar concerto, have helped disseminate it." The composer's wife, Victoria Kamhi, was very harsh in her memoir, however, referring to the Miles Davis recording as "an act of piracy". She described how Rodrigo attempted to sue the SGAE in February 1967 in the Palace of Justice for authorizing the transcription of the concerto for trumpet and jazz, which Davis recorded, but, "we lost the case, for the judge's opinion was that, since Miles Davis' record had granted authors' rights to Joaquín, he had no redress against the SGAE."

- Violinist Ikuko Kawai's version, "Aranjuez", is an upbeat, faster update to the work.
- Clarinettist Jean-Christian Michel's transcription of "Aranjuez" has sold some 1,500,000 copies.
- In School of Rock (2003), Dewey Finn overhears the Concerto de Aranjuez as played by the students. It is a pivotal moment, as it inspires the formation of the school rock band, which gives the movie its title.
- Guitarist Buckethead covered Sketches of Spain on his album Electric Tears as a tribute to Miles Davis.
- Guitarist Uli Jon Roth's version, "Air De Aranjuez", can be found on his album Transcendental Sky Guitar.
- Bassist Buster Williams performs a solo bass transcription of the second movement of Concierto de Aranjuez on his album Griot Libertè (2006).
- The jazz pianist Chick Corea used the beginning of the second movement as an introduction to his composition "Spain". Al Jarreau used the same intro in his arrangement of "Spain" as a vocalese.
- The concerto was the center of the "Friday night in San Francisco" live concert by Paco De Lucia, Al Di Meola, and John McLaughlin in 1981.
- A version of the concerto, influenced by Davis's rendition, was performed by Jim Hall on his 1975 album, Concierto. Hall and his sextet perform Adagio interspersed with solo improvisations (the track runs over 19 minutes).
- Jazz saxophonist Tom Scott performed the second movement on his 1985 release One night – One Day. This is the second movement in entirety.
- An arrangement of the Adagio by Kevin Bolton for a brass band led by a flugelhorn was recorded by the Grimethorpe Colliery Band as part of the soundtrack to the 1996 film Brassed Off. The arrangement is sometimes referred to in jest as the Concierto d'Orange Juice, due to the pronunciation used in the film by actor Pete Postlethwaite.
- The Modern Jazz Quartet has several recordings of the Concierto, one with Laurindo Almeida, another on the Last Concert CD and In Memoriam CD.
- Jim Roberts of Orlando, FL, has two recordings, one with his trio and another with his Saxtet, both very listenable arrangements.
- A version entitled "Rodrigo's Guitar Concerto de Aranjuez (Theme from 2nd Movement)" was included by the Shadows on their album String of Hits in 1979, and released as a single .
- Australian Guitarist Tommy Emmanuel on his 1990 album Dare To Be Different.
- A version of the Adagio was released as a single entitled "Rodrigo's Guitar Concerto" by Geoff Love, (under the name of Manuel & the Music of the Mountains) in 1976. This reached No. 3 in the British singles chart.
- Lebanese singer Fairuz used the music of the second movement on her song "Li Beirut" (لبيروت, "To Beirut').
- Greek singer Demis Roussos popularized the song "Follow Me" which uses the same melody.
- In 1967, the French singer Richard Anthony brought out a single named "Aranjuez mon amour", with lyrics by Guy Bontempelli.
- The Israeli singer Rita also sang a song on her second album that contained the melody of the second movement. The song was titled "Concierto de Aranjuez" or "The Rainbow Song" (Shir Hakeshet), and appeared on her 1988 album Days of Innocence.
- Led Zeppelin's keyboardist/bassist John Paul Jones incorporated parts of the music during an improvisation section of their song "No Quarter" on their 1977 tour.
- Spinal Tap's song "Break Like the Wind" from the album "Break Like the Wind" contains part of the music as a guitar solo
- Electronic musician and composer Isao Tomita performed a version on his 1978 album Kosmos (Space Fantasy).
- André Rieu performed the piece accompanied by the church bells of Maastricht in a performance available on the DVD Songs From My Heart.
- Italian-Frencg singer Dalida had a song entitled "Aranjuez la tua voce" which employed parts of the melody from the second movement.
- Greek singer Nana Mouskouri recorded a German language vocal version "Aranjuez, ein Tag verglüht" with Harry Belafonte's instrumentalists.
- An arrangement of this piece is played by Takanori Arisawa a few times in a 1999 Japanese anime television series, Digimon Adventure.
- Singer Summer Watson included a version called "Aranjuez, ma pensée" on her self-titled 2002 debut album Summer.
- Japanese Jazz-Fusion drummer Akira Jimbo (better known as a former drummer for groups such as Casiopea and Jimsaku) recorded an arrangement of this tune on the album Jimbo de Cover.
- The Limited Edition Drum and Bugle Corps (1988–1992) used the opening portion of the Adagio movement, dubbed "Spain," as a warm-up piece.
- The world famous flamenco guitarist Paco de Lucía performed and recorded Concerto de Aranjuez in 1992. The performance was highly praised by Rodrigo.
- Kimiko Itoh created a vocal/blues arrangement entitled "Follow Me" (a reprise of a song originally interpreted by Demis Roussos in 1982) for Ghost in the Shell 2: Innocence.
- Herb Alpert's 1979 album Rise contains a track, "Aranjuez (mon amour)" (6:42) on Side 2.
- The Cuban classic guitar player Leo Brouwer made a jazz style interpretation of the Concierto with the group Irakere.
- Jazz harpist Dorothy Ashby included the composition in her 1984 album Concierto de Aranjuez.
- Croatian guitar player Petar Čulić.
- Carlos Santana arranged En Aranjuez Con Tu Amor.
- Sarah Brightman: En Aranjuez Con Tu Amor
- The main movement of The Concierto de Aranjuez provides the melody to Rod McKuen's The Wind of Change, a pop song he recorded on his 1971 album Pastorale, as did Petula Clark on her album Petula, also in 1971.
- Turkish singer and songwriter Sezen Aksu made a Turkish version of the song called "De Mardin" which was used as the theme song of the TV series "Uzak Şehir" (Far Away City).
- Manfred Mann based the track "Footprints (En Aranjuez con tu amor)" upon the second movement, on his 2014 solo album Lone Arranger.

== Rodrigo's title of nobility ==
On 30 December 1991, Rodrigo was raised to the Spanish nobility by King Juan Carlos I with the title of Marqués de los Jardines de Aranjuez (English: Marquess of the Gardens of Aranjuez).
