= Ten-string classical guitar of Yepes =

Guitar designed by Narciso Yepes in 1963

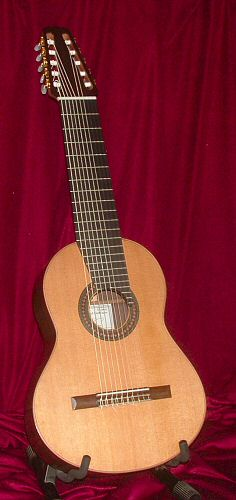

String instrument
- Classification: string
- Hornbostel–Sachs classification: 321.322-5 (composite chordophone sounded by the bare fingers)
- Developed: 1963 by Narciso Yepes in collaboration with José Ramírez III from the classical guitar

Related instruments
- Ten-string guitar

Musicians
- Narciso Yepes; Simon Wynberg

Builders
- Ramírez Guitars; Paulino Bernabe Senior; David 'Jose' Rubio

The ten string extended-range classical guitar, with fully chromatic, sympathetic string resonance was conceived in 1963 (Note: The first compositions for this instrument date from 1963) by Narciso Yepes, and constructed by José Ramírez [III]. This instrument is sometimes referred to as the "modern" 10-string guitar (Note: There is no record of Yepes himself using the adjective "modern" in relation to his guitar or its standard tuning. However, it is used by the LaBella Company to differentiate string sets intended for Yepes' standard tuning and another string set that the company produces, called "Romantic". (See LaBella's catalogue, p. 10, as well as . The Romantic 10-stringed harp guitar's tuning, from which the LaBella Company has derived its "Romantic" tuning string sets, is indicated (among other sources) here (p.3), in a period document (Rischel 30 mu 6611.1784 U48) housed at The Royal Library of Denmark.)) (or the "Yepes guitar") to differentiate it from ten-stringed harp guitars of the 19th century.

Today, ten-string instruments to Ramírez' original design remain available from the Ramírez Company, (Note: See Professional guitars in the current Ramírez Guitars catalog. The Traditional Classic ten-string is as designed by José Ramírez III, while the Special Classic ten-string is a later design by his son José Ramírez IV.) and similar instruments in a variety of designs are available both from the Ramírez Company and other luthiers, notably from Paulino Bernabe Senior.

== Background ==
In the early 1960s, luthier José Ramírez III considered adding sympathetic strings to the classical guitar. He sought advice from the leading classical guitarists of the time, notably Andrés Segovia and Narciso Yepes, both of them players of Ramírez six-string guitars. Eventually, they came up with a ten-string guitar.

Yepes' standard tuning for the 10-string guitar

In Ser Instrumento, Yepes mentions that the reasons that led him to carry out the "design" (diseño), of his instrument were acoustical/physical ("físicas") and musical ("musicales"). After some "initial protest" that the 10-string guitar envisioned by Yepes was "impossible" to construct, Ramírez agreed to the commission and completed the first of these instruments in March 1964. Yepes hastens to point out that he invented nothing (inventado nada) by adding four strings to the guitar, noting the constantly changing number of strings on the guitar during its history, including 10-stringed guitars of the 18th and 19th centuries. Like earlier 10-stringed guitars, his instrument has an augmented tessitura. However, unlike earlier 6- or 10-stringed guitars, the normal tuning of the strings Yepes added "also incorporates all the natural resonance that the instrument lacked in eight of twelve notes of the equal tempered scale". (Note: "además incorporan toda la resonancia natural que le faltaba al instrumento en ocho de las doce notas de escala temperada") As Yepes explains, the tuning of the Romantic ten-stringed guitars is "not exactly the same, because the tuning that I use is also for the resonance")

Yepes recalled that after receiving his first ten-string guitar in 1964, he held a private concert for "friends, musicians, conductors and composers to listen to my instruments and then let them decide which is the better instrument for my concert. I can honestly say that during the concert I played the same compositions once on the six-string guitar and once on the ten-string guitar. They all preferred the ten-string guitar." Yepes then sought the opinion of his former teacher, Nadia Boulanger. After playing the ten-string guitar for her, Yepes recalled that, "She noticed that my playing on my new guitar had more resonance, and this is important, she noticed that I could stop the resonance with my hands if I wanted to. She also preferred my ten-string guitar."

Segovia, though, was highly critical of Yepes's innovation, writing in 1974 that, "I absolutely do not believe that the guitar requires additional strings, neither at the right nor at the left of its fingerboard ... the six it traditionally possesses are quite sufficient. The inventors of this futile addition in sonority are far from having exhausted the natural resources of the instrument." However, the validity of Segovia's criticism can be called into question: First, Segovia seems to have been ignorant of the predominance of 'multi-string' guitars in the 19th century, including the 21-stringed harpolyre for which Fernando Sor composed, as is evidenced in his claim that "Sor....did not feel a need for additional strings". Second, Segovia incorrectly claims that Yepes "added four thick tongues" to the guitar. In fact, Yepes added one "thick" (seventh) string only. As Yepes pointed out, the first criticism from Segovia already came "before he had seen or even heard the instrument, soon after Ramírez made the ten-string guitar." Lastly, the questionable nature of Segovia's criticisms of the Yepes ten-string guitar is revealed by the fact that Segovia wrote "frequent letters" to José Ramírez III in which his unhappiness with weak "notes were always mentioned." Segovia complained that he "had to substitute or cancel a specific musical piece from one of his programs because the note that he had to emphasize coincided with one of the mortifying [weak] notes". (Note: Ramírez misidentifies Segovia's complaint as a "wolf" note; however, it is clear from Ramírez' own description that Segovia complained about weak notes that could not be adequately emphasized when the musical context so required, as opposed to wolf notes in the scientific sense.) Before the Yepes ten-string guitar was designed to address exactly this problem, Segovia had already complained to Ramírez III about how certain notes on the first string of his six-string guitar did "not have the same intensity as the others."

== See also ==
- String resonance (music)
- Harmonic series
