= Ramírez Guitars =

Spanish guitar manufacturer

Guitarras Ramírez
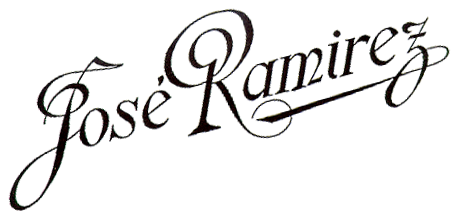
- Type: Private
- Industry: Musical instruments
- Founded: 1882; 144 years ago in Madrid, Spain
- Founder: José Ramírez
- Headquarters: Spain
- Products: Classical guitars
- Website: guitarrasramirez.com

Ramírez Guitars (Guitarras Ramírez in Spanish) is a Spanish manufacturer of professional, concert-quality classical and flamenco guitars. Five generations of the Ramírez family have produced Ramirez guitars.

== History ==
=== Establishment ===
José Ramírez learned how to make guitars while an apprentice to Madrid guitar maker Francisco Gonzalez. Once he had finished his apprenticeship he left, and with his younger brother Manuel (1864-1916) opened a guitar making workshop in 1882 on Cava Baja in Madrid, before in 1890 moving to Calle de la Concepción Jerónima nº 2.

In 1891 Manuel proposed to move to Paris and establish himself there, to which José offered his support. However, for unknown reasons, Manuel changed his plans, and decided instead to start his own workshop in Madrid, which would be in direct competition with his brother. This caused a lasting enmity between the brothers and they never spoke again. Manuel opened his workshop at Cava Baja nº 24, before relocating to Plaza de Santa Ana nº 5, and in 1897 to Calle Arlabán nº 10, where he remained until 1912, before moving next door to nº 11.

Enrique Garcia (1868-1922), who began an apprenticeship with José Ramírez brothers in 1883, joined Manuel. The workshop took some time to attract customers, which led Manuel to bring in income by working for a period as an electrician for the Madrid Electric Company, leaving the workshop in the hands of Garcia. The business made violins as well. In 1893 Manuel won a medal at that year's Chicago Fair.

While José made traditional broad shallow guitars in the style of his mentor Gonzalez, with arched tops which produced a hard loud sound, Manuel differed in his style of guitar. He followed the ideas of Antonio Torres and came to be regarded as his successor, yet at the same time he inquisitively experimented and further developed Torres's ideas. As a result, he began producing guitars that had a lighter, delicate sound, that became popular within the flamenco community. As well as Enrique Garcia, among the luthiers that Manuel trained were Domingo Esteso (1882–1937) and Modesto Borreguero (1893-1969), who became his apprentice at the age of 12.

Manuel was also regarded as am excellent maker of violins.

In 1895 Enrique Garcia left his position as Manuel's foreman to move to Barcelona to establish his own workshop. Manuel Ramirez subsequently hired Santos Hernandez (1873-1943) in about 1905 as foreman. By 1912, Manuel Ramírez had been appointed luthier to the National Conservatoire in Madrid.

In 1912 a young Andrés Segovia visited Manuel with a request to rent a guitar for a concert. After hearing him play, Manuel gave him the guitar, which had been largely made by Hernandez. Segovia used the guitar in concerts and on recordings from 1912 to 1937, and played it at his United States debut in New York's Town Hall in 1929. These performances brought Manuel Ramírez's style of guitar and Hernandez's skill to the notice of other players. The guitar that Manuel Ramírez gave Segovia was later donated by Segovia's widow, Emilita, to the Metropolitan Museum of Art in New York, where it now resides.

Manuel Ramírez died on 25 February 1916 before he could enjoy the benefits of his connection with Segovia. Modesto Borreguero then planned to open his own workshop, and even had labels printed, but changed his plans after Manuel's widow asked him to stay. Esteso left in 1917 to establish his own workshop, followed by Hernandez in 1920. Borreguero continued working for Manuel's widow, who died in 1921, until the workshop finally closed around 1923.

Segovia encouraged luthier Hermann Hauser and other makers to copy Manuel Ramírez's style of guitar. Segovia would later play Hauser's guitars until he returned to using a new Ramírez guitar in 1960.

While José Ramírez never built anything other than traditional guitars, he built up a strong business that developed a number of luthiers, including his own son José Ramírez II (1885-1995) as well as Rafael Casana, Enrique Gracia, Julian Gómez Ramírez (1879-1943), who was no relation, Francisco Simplicio and Antonio Viudez.

In 1897, José Ramirez was awarded a gold medal for his guitars at the Logroño exposition.

Against his father's wishes, José Ramírez II (whose full formal name was José Simón Ramírez de Galarreta y Pernías) left the business in 1904 when he was twenty to join a folk group on a planned two-year tour of South America. After touring Argentina, Chile and Uruguay, the group dissolved, and after meeting his future wife, he took up residence as a guitarist in Buenos Aires.

=== José Ramírez II ===
Two years after José Ramírez's death in 1923, José Ramírez II, by now married with two children, José Ramírez III and Alfredo, returned to Madrid. Until his return the workshop was managed by his senior luthiers, while his daughters and Jesús Martínez operated the shop. José II bought out his siblings' shares in the business. The business was very seasonal, as generally the guitars were only purchased at the end of the harvest season and at Christmas when they were used by serenading groups. As a result, sufficient income had to be generated during these periods to pay the employees while made the guitars over the summer.

José II moved away from his father's style of guitar to one closer to the style of his uncle Manuel. He introduced the simple elegant headstock that became a feature of the Ramírez brand. In 1929 a Ramírez guitar was awarded a gold medal at the Ibero-American Exposition of 1929 in Seville.

During and in the aftermath of the Spanish Civil War, the company had great difficulty in sourcing materials. These shortages encouraged José III, known as Pepé, who had formally joined the workshop in 1940, to experiment with non-traditional woods and design techniques. The younger José's love of innovation was often to the dismay of his father, who felt that the results would not be profitable. This led to frustrations with his father, as frequently he sold his work with little if any documentation as to the construction, the results, or the buyer.

José II's other son Alfredo, who was supportive of his brother's experiments, managed the administrative side of the business.

Among the luthiers who were trained or worked for Ramírez Guitars during this period were Marcelo Barbero (1904-1956), Alfonso Benito and Manuel Rodriguez Fernandez (1926-2008).

=== José Ramírez III ===
As Alfredo had died in 1954, following the death of José II in 1957, José Ramírez III José III, with the help of his wife Angelita, was forced to take over the management of the business and for a time abandon making guitars himself. However, he continued to experiment, putting designs on paper to be built by his employees and supervising every phase of construction of the instruments.

José III worked closely with top performers, which brought acceptance to his innovations. Since they had first met in 1952, Segovia had encouraged him with constructive yet often brutal criticism to meet his exacting standards.

Among his innovations was to introduce western red cedar (Thuja plicata) for the soundboard of the guitar instead of the spruce that had been used up until then.

In 1959, Manuel Contreras (Madrid, 1926-1995) joined the workshop as a senior luthier and remained with them for three years, until he left to open his own guitar workshop. By 1960, Andrés Segovia was sufficiently impressed with José III's efforts to borrow his first Ramírez guitar and take it on tour with him. Made by Contreras, it incorporated Ramírez's latest ideas with a longer string length of 664 mm, larger body, and asymmetrical bracing, unlike the symmetrical Torres pattern which most luthiers had adhered to since the mid-1800s. It was designed to have the power and projection needed to play solo concerts in large auditoriums, or to play with an orchestra, as well as to produce a fullness of tone, sweetness and a balance across the entire register. Both these innovations and many others are standard today. Ramírez went on to build more guitars for Segovia, which became his guitars of choice after having for the past 25 years used those made by Herman Hauser.

More radical still, in 1963 he built a ten-string guitar for Narciso Yepes, to accommodate Yepes' unique chromatically balanced tuning, and later an eight-string guitar for José Tomás. High-end professional models based on both of these extended-range guitars remain in the company's current catalogue.

As high quality German spruce became difficult to source, and increasingly expensive, José III in 1965 introduced western red cedar on the soundboards of the company's 1a and 2a models, and convinced influential artists to use them. He also developed a new varnish that improved the sound quality while offering better protection.

In the 1960s, to cope with increasing demand, while retaining the original premises at Calle de la Concepción Jerónimo nº 2 as a shop the company moved its workshop to Calle de General Margallo nº 10, and greatly expanded its number of employees in order to produce more guitars. Ramírez established an efficient production basis where the apprentices using dedicated procedures did the basic tasks, which allowed more time for the qualified luthiers to undertake the difficult work. Prior to this, all fine-quality Spanish guitars had been produced by individual luthiers which had resulted in small production levels. To increase production further, Ramírez purchased a building near Ventas, in which a large workshop was established which allowed production to rise to 1,000 hand-built guitars a year.

In 1971 the sales shop was replaced by a larger shop at Concepción Jerónima 5, directly in front of the original establishment.

Up until the early 1970s, the company's classical guitars were built with back and sides made of Brazilian rosewood. As high-quality Brazilian rosewood become scarcer and expensive, most of their classical guitars have since used Indian rosewood.

Ramírez recruited and trained many luthiers, among them Paulino Bernabé, Carmelo Llerena Martinez ( CLL or later on #4 ), Manuel Caceras, Manuel González Contreras, Felix Manzanero, Manuel Rodriguez, Enrique Borreguero Marcos, Miguel Malo Martinez, José Romero, Ignacio M. Rozas, Mariano Tezanos and Pedro Contreras Valbuena, with many going on to establish their own workshops. Among his apprentices were Ramírez's own children, José IV (1953-2000), who undertook an apprenticeship from 1971 to 1977, and Amalia (1955- ), who had commenced her apprenticeship in 1976 before after its completion, leaving to become an astrologer. In 1979, the company sent a selection of its finest guitars to Segovia, from which he chose one made by José Ramírez IV.

In the late 1980s the end of government export support and changes in Spain's tax structure led to a decrease in sales and the firm getting into financial difficulties.

In 1983, Jose Ramirez III designed the “Camara” guitar, with the intention of eliminating the “wolf notes.” It gave some positive results, for instance, the clarity of its sound was excellent for studio recordings.

In 1988 Jose III passed control of the business to José IV and Amalia, who had returned in the same year to help her brother. A subsequent major restructuring resulted in the closure of the Ventas workshop in 1992, a reduction in the number of employees and concentrating at the General Margallo workshop on wholly handmade professional instruments, which reduced to production rate of 130 a year. They also contracted out the construction of their top-quality student instruments to other workshops, which were then delivered to Ramírez for final inspection and adjustment.

José III died in 1995, his workshop having produced in his lifetime 20,000 hand-built guitars, nearly 30 to 40 times that of most of the company's competitors.

=== José IV and Amalia Ramírez ===
Since José III had introduced it in the early 1960s, the company's top hand built model, the 1a or Primeria José IV, had been the rich slightly mellow-sounding Tradicionel, which had the reputation of being an uncomfortable “guitar for giants”. To complement it José IV developed the Especial, a new brighter, lighter-sounding, more comfortable guitar, which was introduced to the market in 1992.

In the summer of 1995 Ramirez were unable to renew the lease on the original shop at Concepción Jerónima nº 2 and moved to Calle de la Paz nº8.

José IV died of lung cancer in 2000, leaving Amalia to oversee the entire operation. As of 2010 this consists of a team of fourteen, including Amalia herself, four other guitar makers, and three apprentices. José IV's children José Enrique and Cristina have been involved in the family business since 2006 and 2007 respectively.

Today the company offers, in addition to classical guitars, electro-acoustic guitars, solid-body electric guitars and flamenco instruments.

A Ramírez hand-built classical guitar is typically made of 14,836 items, of which 438 are essential pieces which make up the structure of the instrument, while the rest are the myriad of little pieces that go into the decoration.

== Notable users of Ramírez guitars ==
Among the artists who have used the company's guitars are:

- Chet Atkins
- Charlie Byrd
- Roberto Fabbri
- Egberto Gismonti
- El Niño Miguel
- George Harrison (Note: On the song "And I Love Her" by The Beatles, from the album A Hard Day's Night (1964).)
- Robby Krieger
- Stephen Stills
- Matthias Jabs (Note: On the album Sting in the Tail (2010) by Scorpions.)
- Mark Knopfler
- Alex Lifeson
- Hank Marvin (Note: On The Shadows' hit recording "Guitar Tango" by The Shadows, from the album Out of the Shadows (1962).)
- Mike Oldfield
- Roy Orbison
- Christopher Parkening
- Bucky Pizzarelli
- Nate Najar
- Sabicas
- Alexander-Sergei Ramírez
- The Romeros
- Manolo Sanlúcar
- Andrés Segovia
- Víctor Monge Serranito
- Galina Vale
- Kazuhito Yamashita
- Narciso Yepes
- David Russell
- Dolly Parton

== See also ==
- Classical guitar making
