= Antonio Emilio Pascual =

Spanish luthier

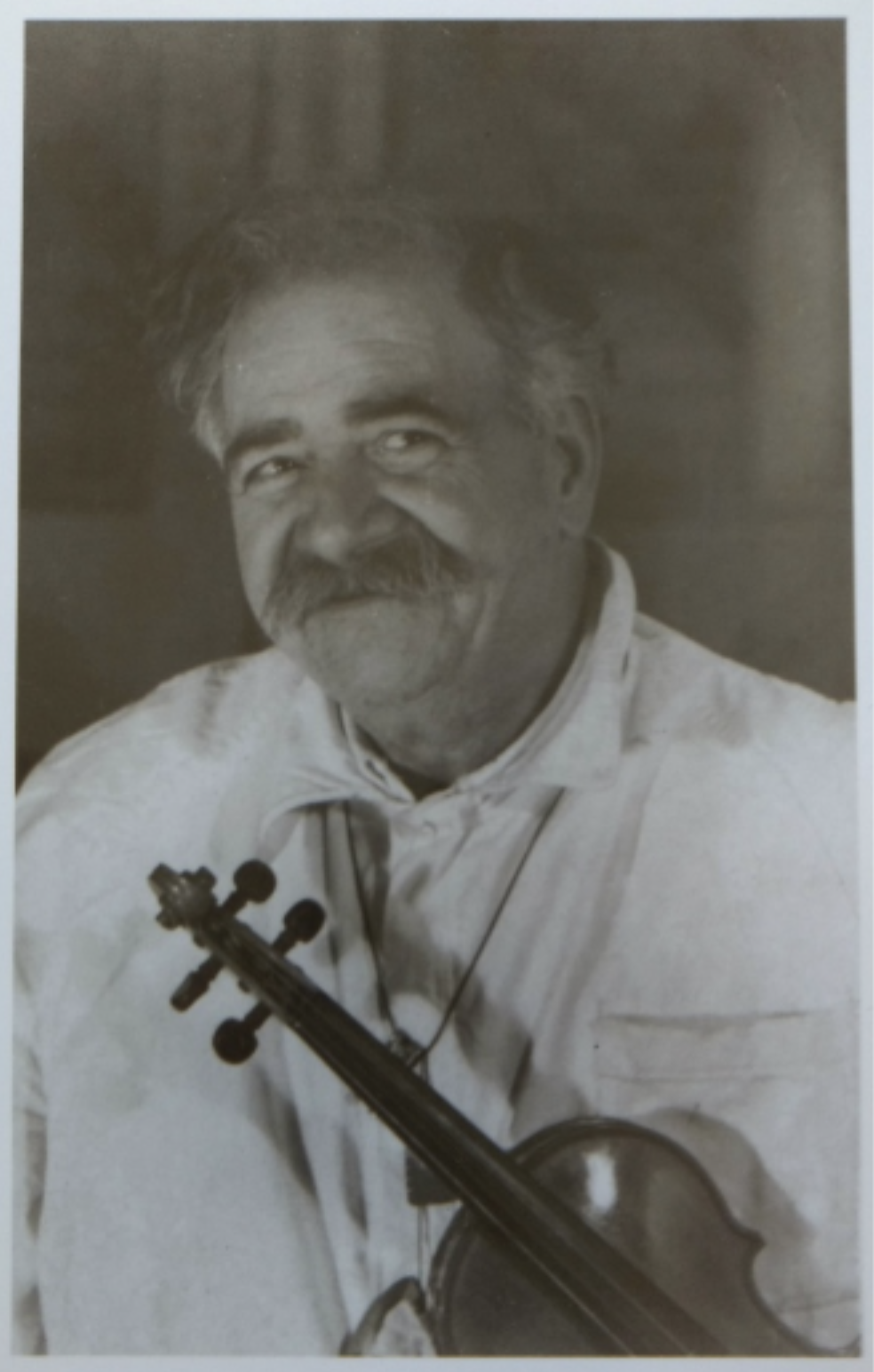
- Born: Antonio Emilio Pascual Viudes Aznar; November 10, 1883; Crevillente, España
- Died: 1959; Buenos Aires, Argentina
- Occupation: Luthier

Antonio Emilio Pascual Viudes Aznar (November 10, 1883 – 1959) was a Spanish luthier, known for his mastery in the construction of string instruments. He was the last descendant of a family of luthiers with a long-standing tradition dating back to 1421.

== Life ==
Born in Crevillente, Alicante, Spain, he belonged to a family with a rich tradition in lutherie. From a young age, he showed exceptional talent, which led him to train in the most prestigious workshops of his time.

At the age of 14, Antonio Emilio was sent to Madrid to refine his skills under the tutelage of Manuel Ramírez, one of the most renowned luthiers of the time. He worked in Ramírez’s workshop from 1897 to 1909, collaborating with other great artisans such as Santos Hernández and Domingo Esteso. For a brief period, he also worked with José Ramírez, Manuel’s brother.

In 1909, Antonio Emilio decided to move to Buenos Aires, Argentina. Although he resided in Argentina, he continued to use the city of Madrid on the labels of his creations, likely to maintain the prestige associated with Spanish makers.

Antonio Emilio continued working in his workshop in Buenos Aires until the late 1950s. His dedication to lutherie did not wane over time, and his instruments remained highly valued. He died in 1959.

== Contributions to Lutherie ==
Antonio Emilio specialized in the construction of violins, violas, cellos, and guitars. His instruments were renowned for their exceptional sound quality and aesthetics. Inspired by the style of Antonio de Torres, his guitars were characterized by elegant lines and great sound intensity. Additionally, his expertise in the construction of bowed instruments earned him a prominent place in the musical community.

During his stay in Buenos Aires, Antonio Emilio not only crafted instruments but also shared his knowledge with apprentices such as José B. Romero, ensuring the continuity of his legacy in Argentine lutherie. His instruments were used by prominent musicians, including members of the orchestra of the Teatro Colón.
