= Francisco Simplicio =

Spanish luthier (1874–1932)

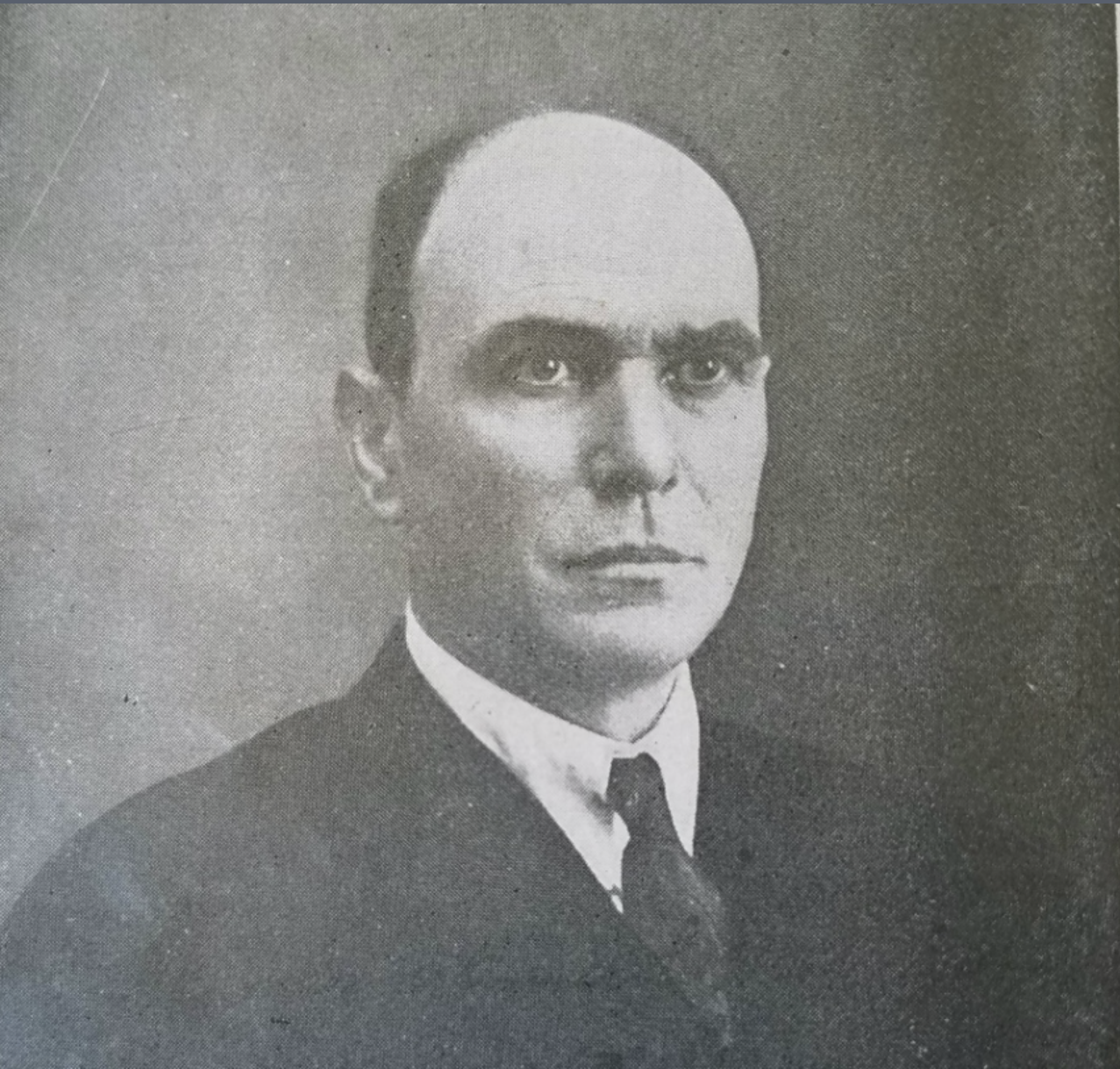
- Francisco Simplicio
- Born: 18 October 1874; Barcelona, Spain
- Died: 14 January 1932 (aged 57); Barcelona, Spain
- Occupation: Luthier

Francisco Simplicio (October 18, 1874 – January 14, 1932) was a Spanish luthier, known for his classical guitars built in the early 20th century.

== Life ==
Francisco Simplicio was born in Barcelona, Spain. He initially trained as a cabinetmaker, a trade that deeply influenced his later work as a guitar maker.

He began his career as a luthier relatively late. In 1919, he became an apprentice to Enrique García, a renowned guitar maker from Barcelona and former student of José Ramírez. García’s instruments were heavily influenced by Antonio de Torres, considered the father of the modern classical guitar.

After García’s death in 1922, Simplicio took over his workshop and inherited his tools, templates, and design approaches. Until 1925, he continued to sell his guitars under the name of Enrique García, presenting himself as the "Only disciple and student of Enrique García."

From 1922 until his death in 1932, Simplicio produced a limited number of guitars; it is estimated that fewer than 340 were made.

In 1929, Simplicio exhibited his guitars at the Barcelona International Exposition, where he gained international recognition for his work. He received the "Grand Prize" and a gold medal, cementing his reputation as one of the most outstanding guitar makers of his time.

Francisco Simplicio died in Barcelona on January 14, 1932, at the age of 57.

== Legacy ==
Francisco Simplicio's guitars typically have larger bodies, fan bracing similar to that of Torres and García, and a strong emphasis on ornamental details—a reflection of his training as a cabinetmaker.

His work had a significant influence on later Catalan guitar makers, including his nephew and successor, Miguel Simplicio, who continued the workshop after his death.

In 2016, luthier Pablo Rodríguez created a reconstruction of a 1923 Simplicio guitar.

== See also ==
- Antonio de Torres
- Classical guitar
