= Julio Conde =

Spanish luthier

Julio Conde (Villalba de los Alcores, Valladolid, 1915 - Madrid, 1995) was a Spanish luthier trained by his uncle Domingo Esteso at his workshop in Madrid, where Julio worked with his brothers Faustino y Mariano, establishing Hermanos Conde trademark.

== History ==
In 1915, with the opening of his workshop, the luthier Domingo Esteso created a new form of conceiving the handmade construction of the Spanish Guitar, with his wife Nicolasa Salamanca varnishing the guitars. Some years later, a young Julio Conde, master's nephew, began to work with his brothers Faustino and Mariano, in their uncle's workshop, learning and developing his special and elaborated handmade manufacturing technique.

When Domingo died, and after working for his widow, they took over the workshop, called since then Conde Hermanos Sobrinos de Esteso.

Over the years, and due to the boom that the guitar acquired, at the beginning of the 50s they created a new elaboration and attention customers centre in Atocha 53 street, managed for Julio, who in a few years became reference point mainly for professional (Niño Ricardo, Sabicas, Melchor de Marchena, Paco de Lucía, Chicuelo, etc.) as well as for amateur people in the guitar world, both flamenco or classic.

After the death of his brothers Faustino y Mariano in the years 1988 and 1989, Julio, the only nephew successor, continued enlarging even more the figure of the high quality handmade guitar inside and outside our frontiers.

At the present time, and from Julio's death in 1995, their sons and his granddaughter, in the same centre, continue the tradition Hermanos Conde, where the careful selection of materials and the quality of the final sound are maintained and continue as a high-priority goal.
