= Modesto Borreguero =

Spanish luthier (1892–1969)

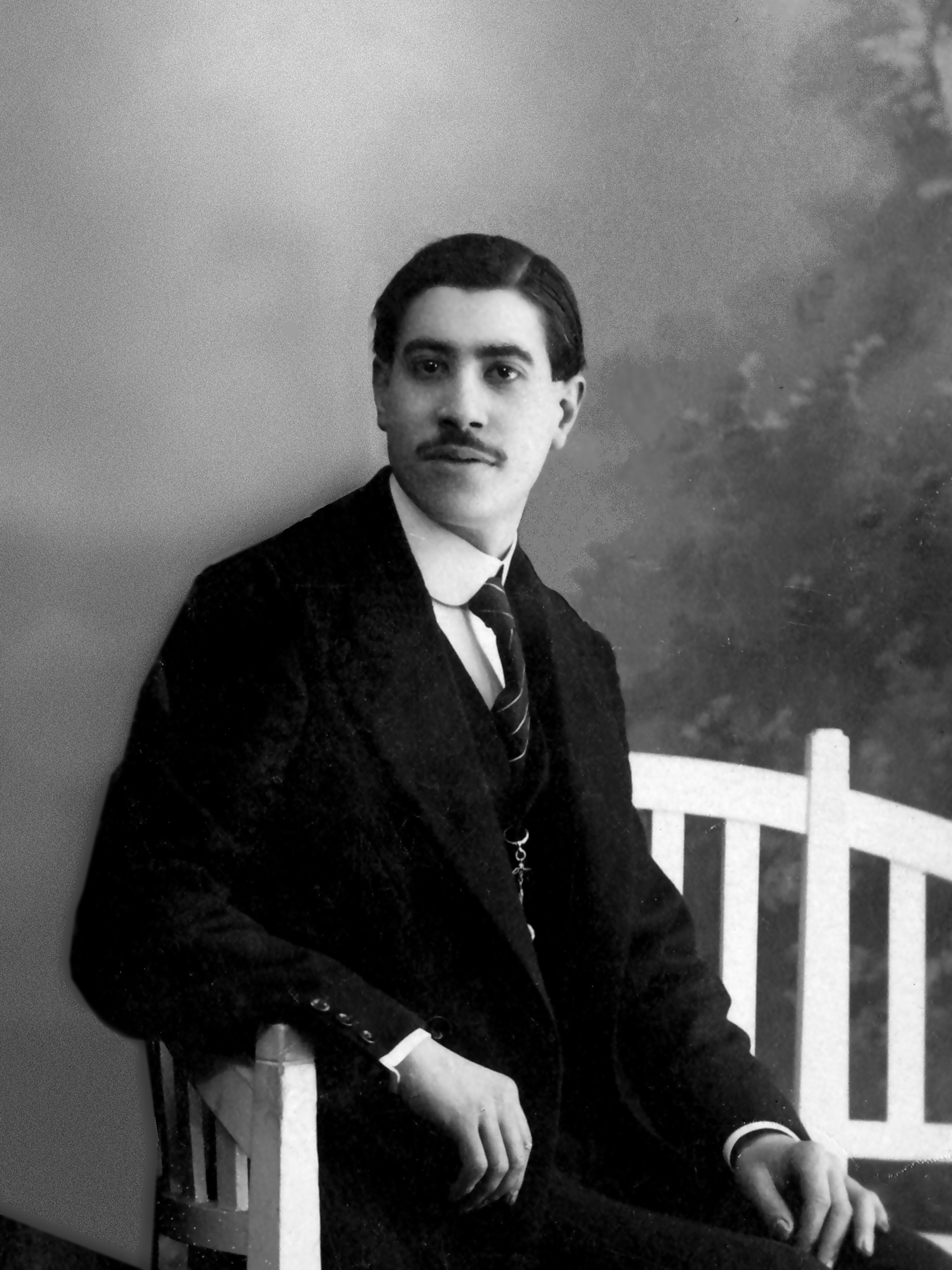
- Modesto Borreguero
- Born: Modesto Borreguero Ortega; June 15, 1892; Madrid, Spain
- Died: June 21, 1969 (aged 77); Madrid, Spain
- Occupation: Luthier

Modesto Borreguero Ortega (Madrid, June 15, 1892 – Madrid, June 22, 1969) was a Spanish guitar maker, a disciple of Manuel Ramírez de Galarreta. Along with Domingo Esteso López and Santos Hernández Rodríguez, who were also disciples of Ramírez, they are considered the pillars of the Madrid School of Guitar Making.

== Life ==
He was born in Madrid, in the Chamberí district, at 21 Bravo Murillo Street, on June 15, 1892, the son of José Borreguero, a native of Pinto, and Carmen Ortega, a Madrilenian. In 1904, at the age of twelve, he began as an apprentice to the prestigious guitar maker Manuel Ramírez de Galarreta y Planell, in the workshop located at 10 Arlabán Street in Madrid.

In this workshop, Modesto learned his craft, becoming one of the most highly regarded journeymen by his master. There he met two other disciples: Domingo Esteso from Cuenca, who would leave the workshop in 1915 to establish his own on Gravina Street, and Santos Hernández Rodríguez from Madrid.

In 1916, he married Amalia Marcos San Martín and moved to 28 Travesía del Fucar Street. The couple had two children: Amalia and Enrique; the latter would become his first apprentice, learning the trade from his father.

The same year he got married, Manuel Ramírez de Galarreta died. Modesto, then 24 years old, married, and well-versed in the craft, considered opening his own workshop, as evidenced by the labels he had printed in 1917, where he appears as the "Sole Journeyman of Manuel Ramírez." However, at the request of Ramírez’s widow, he continued working at his master's workshop for a few more years, using the label “Widow of Manuel Ramírez” on his instruments, along with a stamp bearing the initials MB in one corner to distinguish his work from that of his colleague Santos Hernández, who would open his own workshop in 1918.

In 1923, Borreguero, now independent, established himself at 5 Duque de Fernán Núñez Street. It was here that he experienced his best period as a guitar maker. Most of his production was sent to South America, primarily to Argentina. His labels read: Modesto Borreguero, Constructor. Former journeyman of Manuel Ramírez.

In 1934, Domingo Prat wrote about him: "A notable guitar maker, contemporary, based in the capital of Spain. Borreguero was under the guidance of the excellent luthier Manuel Ramírez; as he states on his labels: Former journeyman of Manuel Ramírez. He is currently established in Madrid, where he is well regarded for his distinguished work."

The Civil War caught him living at 59 Mesón de Paredes Street, ground floor, left, where he had set up his workshop a year earlier. In October 1936, his wife died.

After the war ended, he continued his work, specializing in bandurrias and lutes, while still crafting his exquisitely made concert guitars. Guitar collector Sheldon Urlik, who owns two of Borreguero’s guitars, notes that from his hands came both the most exquisite concert guitars and more modest, everyday instruments—both of which were necessary for economic survival. It was during this period that he began to earn a reputation as the guitar maker of the people of Madrid. His bandurrias and lutes could be heard at street festivals, parades, serenades, and student music groups.

In 1945, without leaving the traditional Madrid neighborhood, he set up his tools at 27 Zurita Street, ground floor, left. He would remain at this address until 1948.

At the end of the forties, the Spanish National Organization for the Blind (ONCE) commissioned him to build all the instruments for their rondalla: guitars, lutes, bandurrias, laudón, alto bandurria, and bass guitar.

In 1952, he moved to number 4 Desengaño Street, where he exclusively made his instruments for Casa Garrido. It was during this time, Garrido says, that a Borreguero guitar sold for five thousand pesetas.

In 1963, while living at number 13 Escuadra Street, he retired due to illness. He died in Madrid on June 22, 1969.

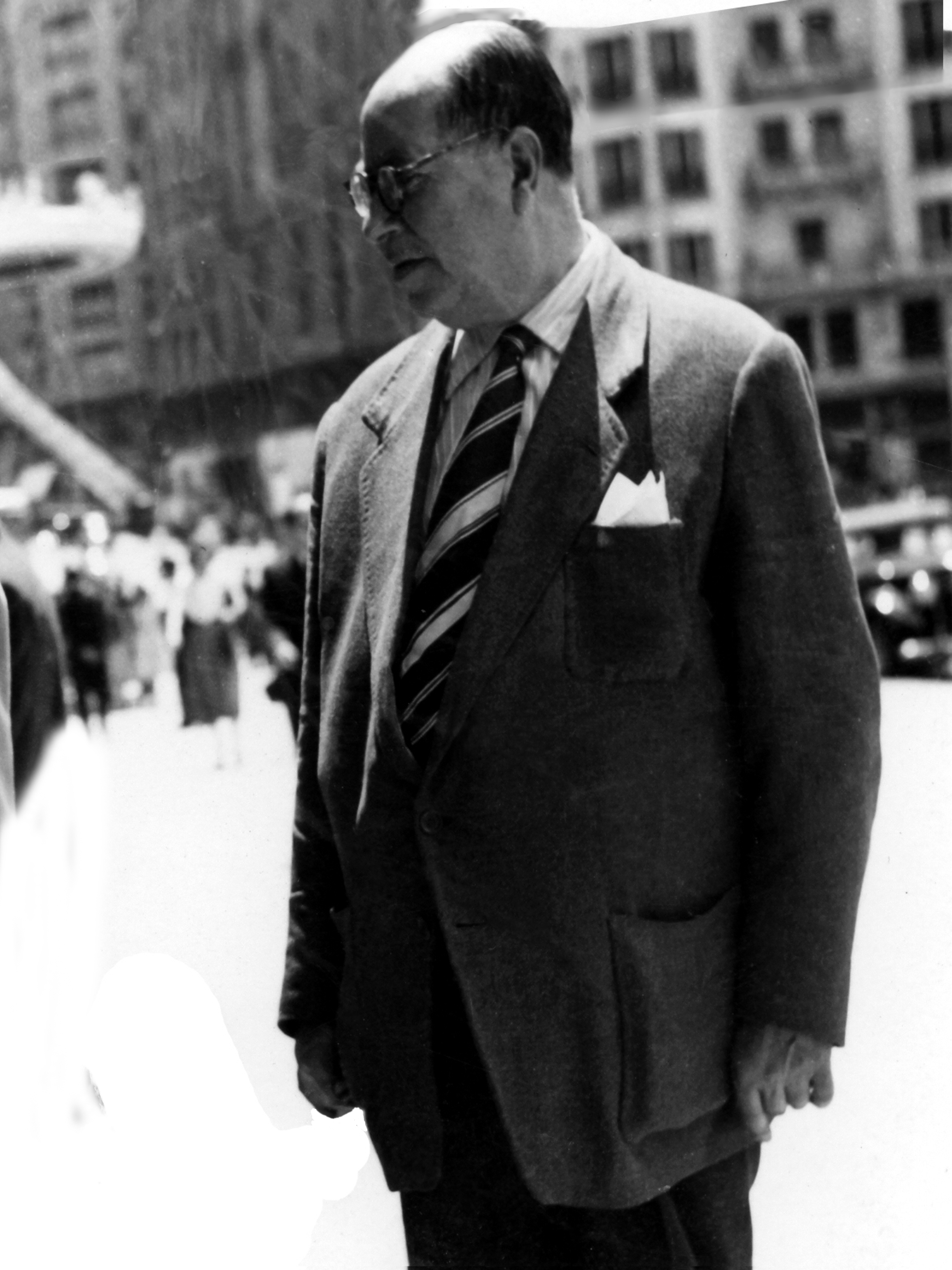
Modesto Borreguero in 1967.

== Bibliography ==
- Guitarreros de Madrid: artesanos de la prima y el bordón. Luis F. Leal Pinar. Editorial Dulcinea, 2008. ISBN 978-84-612-3097-6.
- A Collection of Fine Spanish Guitars from Torres to the Present. Sheldon Urlik. Sunny Knoll Pub., 1997. ISBN 978-0-9660771-0-0.
- The Art and Craft of Making Classical Guitars. Manuel Rodriguez. Hal Leonard Pub Co, 2009. ISBN 978-1-4234-8035-8.
- 1001 Guitars to Dream of Playing Before You Die. Terry Burrows. American Lutherie: The Guild 1998. ISBN 978-1-84403-751-3.
- Tras la huella de Andrés Segovia. J. A. Pérez-Bustamante de Monasterio. University of Cádiz, 1990. ISBN 978-84-7786-018-1.
- En torno a la Guitarra. José Ramírez III. Soneto, 1993. ISBN 978-84-87969-40-9.
