= Hermanos Conde =

Hermanos Conde (Conde Brothers) are luthiers, makers of classical and flamenco guitars.

== History ==
The Conde dynasty was founded in Madrid by Domingo Esteso in 1915. Esteso trained his nephews Faustino and Mariano Conde Sr. Later, the young Julio Conde joined his brothers.

Domingo Esteso died in 1937, and after that time the three Conde Brothers continued working for Esteso's widow under the name of "Viuda y Sobrinos de Esteso" (Esteso's Widow and Nephews) until 1960.

In the early 1950s, Julio Conde set up a new handicraft guitar center.

From 1960 until 1988-89 they took over the shop and called themselves "Sobrinos de Domingo Esteso Conde Hermanos" (Esteso's Nephews, Conde Brothers) or "Hermanos Conde Sobrinos de Domingo Esteso" (Conde Brothers, Esteso's Nephews).

Mariano Sr. later established his own shop close to the Royal Theatre, calling it "Conde Hermanos Sucesores Sobrinos de Esteso". His two sons, Felipe, born in 1957 and Mariano Jr., born 1959, began their apprenticeship with their father and uncle Faustino when they were about 15 years old. Faustino died in 1988 and Mariano Sr. in 1989.

Felipe and Mariano Conde (sons of Mariano Conde Sr.) manufactured flamenco guitars in their workshop at Felipe V St. nº 2 in Madrid close to the Teatro Real (Royal Theatre) and the Palacio Real (Royal Palace). They were known as "Conde Hermanos Sucesores Sobrinos de Esteso" (Conde Brothers - Esteso's Nephews Successors)

Felipe and Mariano have now broken off their business association. They work in different workshops and sell different models of guitars.

Felipe Conde works with his son and daughter Felipe Jr. and María at his shop at Arrieta 4, in front of the Royal Theatre, close to the old shop. Mariano Conde works at his shop at Amnistía 1, next to the Opera metro station.

Meanwhile, Julio carried on making guitars until his death in 1995, and now his sons and granddaughter maintain the tradition of "Conde Hermanos" at Atocha 53.

== Notable users ==
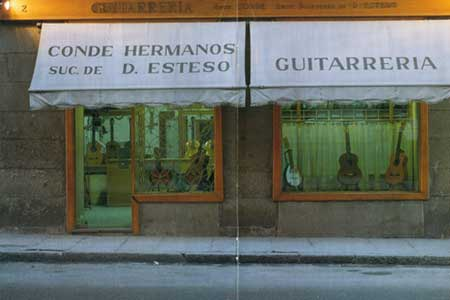
Shop front at C/ Felipe Vº, 2

Famous Flamenco guitarists such as Mario Escudero, Oscar Herrero, Paco de Lucía, Melchor de Marchena, Andrea Nannetti, Niño Ricardo, Rafael Riqueni, Sabicas, Esteban de Sanlucar, Regino Sainz de la Maza and guitarists with other styles such as David Byrne, Leonard Cohen, Jesse Cook, Al Di Meola, Bob Dylan, Toninho Horta, Steve Howe, Lenny Kravitz, Meiko, Cat Stevens or John Williams have played with Hermanos Conde guitars.

== See also ==
- Classical guitar making
