= Esteso =

Esteso is a Spanish surname. Notable people with the surname include:

- Domingo Esteso (1882–1937), Spanish luthier and guitar maker
- Fernando Esteso (1945–2026), Spanish comedian, actor and singer
- Pedro Antonio Esteso (born 1976), Spanish middle-distance runner
