= Paulino Bernabe II =

Spanish luthier

Paulino Bernabe II (born 9 June 1960), is a Spanish luthier.

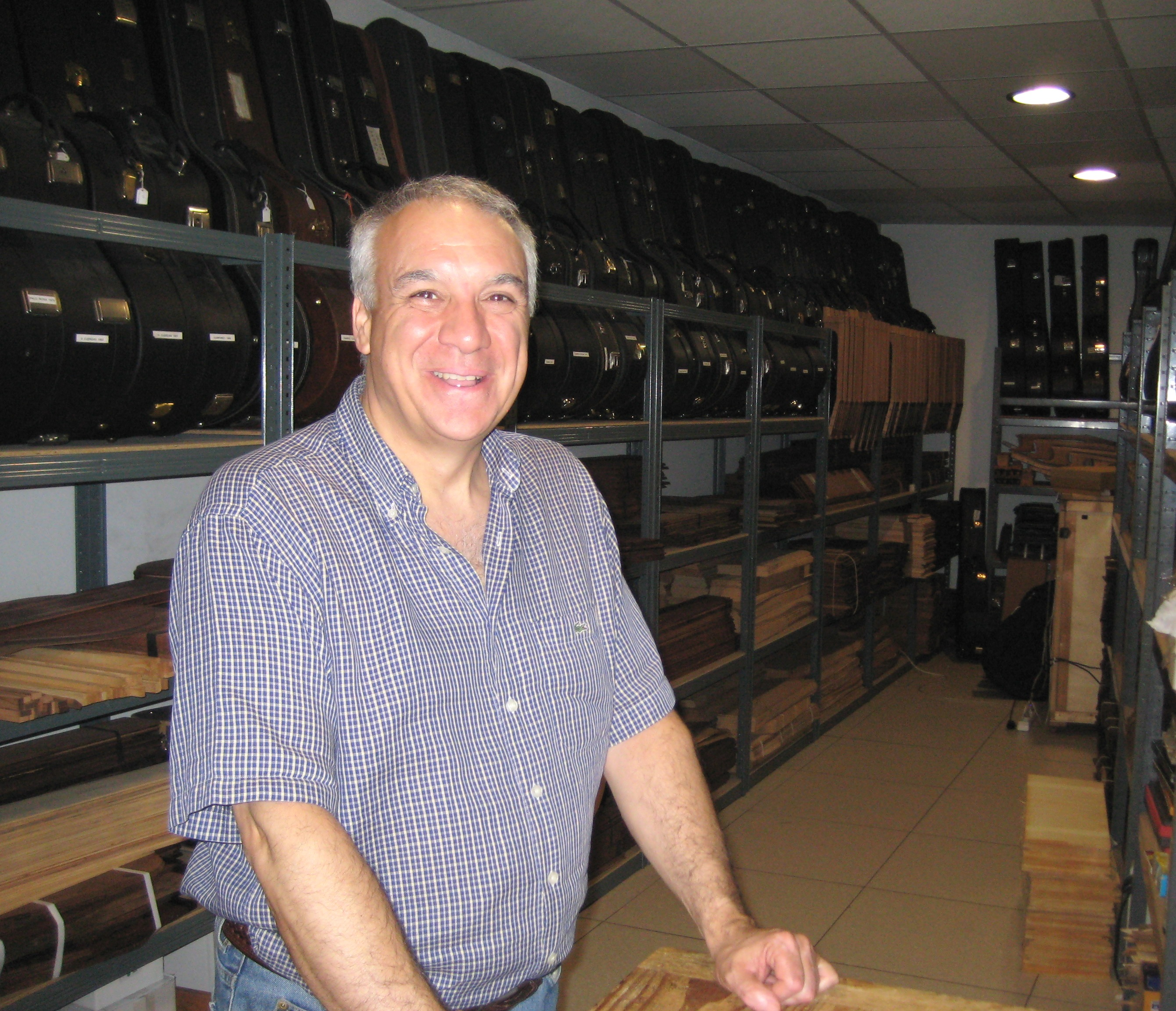
The luthier Paulino Bernabe II in his workshop). June 2012.

== Life ==
Paulino Bernabé learned the art of making classical guitars from his father, Paulino Bernabe Senior, a famous Spanish luthier. Since the early 1980s until shortly before the death of his father in 2007 the master worked together with Bernabe Senior and took over the workshop. Guitars made by Paulino Bernabé II are played by internationally known guitarists, such as John Williams and Johanna Beisteiner. In 2011 he founded the association Spanish Guitar Foundation in order to protect the heritage of the Spanish guitar-making style and promote young artists. The Foundation also has a fine collection of 19th and 20th century guitars.
