= Matilde Salvador i Segarra =

Spanish artist (1918–2007)

Matilde Salvador Segarra
- Born: 23 March 1918; Castellón de la Plana
- Died: 5 October 2007 (aged 89)
- Occupation: Musical composer
- Spouse: Vicente Asencio

Matilde Salvador Segarra (23 March 1918 – 5 October 2007) was a Spanish composer and painter.

== Life ==
Salvador was born and raised in Castellón de la Plana, Valencian Community. She was married to the composer Vicente Asencio (1908–1979). She was a leading figure in promoting the culture and music of the Valencian Community. One of her most famous compositions was Homenatge a Mistral for solo guitar.

Matilde Salvador died of a stroke on 5 October 2007 in her native Valencia, aged 89.

== Works ==
=== Piano ===
- 1935 Campanas
- 1937 Danza de la luna. (de Romance de la luna) (Fuera de catálogo)
- 1937 Danza del niño mirando a la luna. (de Romance de la luna) (Fuera de catálogo)
- 1946 Planyívola (Fuera de catálogo)
- 1954 Judas (Fuera de catálogo)

=== Vocal ===
- 1935 Canción de atardecer, para voz y piano. (de Set cançons) (Fuera de catálogo)
- 1935 Cuentan que la rosa, para voz y piano. (de Set cançons) (Fuera de catálogo)
- 1935 Nana, para voz y piano. (de Vuit cançons) (Fuera de catálogo)
- 1936 El amor y la llama para voz y piano. (de Set cançons) (Fuera de catálogo)
- 1937 Tres cançons valencianes, para voz y piano, (Existe en versión orquestral realizada por Vicente Asencio)
  - Cançó alegre
  - Cançó de recança
  - Cançò d’amor (Fuera de catálogo)
- 1939 Alba lírica, ciclo de canciones para voz y piano (1936–1939) (De la segunda y la tercera existe versión para voz y guitarra)
  - Canción, Llanto
  - Canción de cuna
  - Nostalgia
  - Cantar de enamorada
  - Alamillos verdes
- 1939 Como esa agua, para voz y piano. (de Set cançons) (Fuera de catálogo)
- 1939 De los álamos vengo, para voz y piano. (de Tonadas Antiguas) (Fuera de catálogo)
- 1939 Seis canciones españolas, ciclo de canciones para voz y piano (de la número 4 existe versión para violín y piano, y de la número 6 versión para voz y orquesta)
  - Castellana
  - Gallega
  - Asturiana
  - Andaluza
  - Zamorana
  - Valenciana
- 1940 ¡Adiós!, para voz y piano. (de Set cançons) (Fuera de catálogo)
- 1940 Caminante, para voz y piano. (de Set cançons) (Fuera de catálogo)
- 1942 El padre Lucas, para voz y piano. (de Set cançons) (Fuera de catálogo)
- 1942 Set cançons, ciclo para voz y piano (1935–1942), títulos ya indicados en su año de composición (Fuera de catálogo)
- 1943 Una veu, para voz y piano (Fuera de catálogo)
- 1945 Ai! Que no n’era, para voz y piano. (de Tonadas Antiguas) (Fuera de catálogo)
- 1945 Bona nit!, para voz y piano (de Planys, cançons i una nadala)
- 1945 Cançó alegre, para voz y piano (de Planys, cançons i una nadala)
- 1945 Cançó fetillera, para voz y piano (de Planys, cançons i una nadala)
- 1945 Tonadas Antiguas, ciclo de tres canciones para voz y piano, títulos ya indicados en su año de composición (Fuera de catálogo)
- 1945 Tres morillas, para voz y piano (de Tonadas Antiguas) (Fuera de catálogo) (Existe versión para coro a cuatro voces mixtas)
- 1946 Balada para voz y piano (de Homenaje a la poesía femenina de América); existe versión para voz y orquesta
- 1946 Canción de vela para voz y piano; existe versión para voz y orquesta
- 1946 La loba, para voz y piano (de Homenaje a la poesía femenina de América); existe versión para voz y orquesta (de Tres nanas)
- 1946 La señora luna, para voz y piano (de Homenaje a la poesía femenina de América); existe versión para voz y orquesta (de Tres nanas)
- 1946 Por los caminitos, para voz y piano (de Homenaje a la poesía femenina de América); existe versión para voz y orquesta (de Tres nanas)
- 1947 Recança, para voz y piano (de Planys, cançons i una nadala)
- 1947 Tres nanas, para voz y piano; títulos ya indicados en su año de composición
- 1947 Cancioncilla, para voz y piano (de Cancionero de la enamorada); existe versión para voz y orquesta
- 1947 Morena me llama, para voz y guitarra (de Endechas y cantares de Sepharad); existe versión para voz y piano
- 1948 Arietas de Primavera ciclo de canciones para voz y piano
- 1948 Baladilla del pastor para voz y piano; para voz y orquesta
- 1948 Canciones de nana y desvelo ciclo para voz y piano
  - Desvelo ante el agua; existe versión para voz y orquesta y para voz y guitarra
  - Desvelo de la madre; existe versión para voz y orquesta
  - Desvelo del mar; existe versión para voz y orquesta
  - Nana de la Virgen; existe versión para voz y orquesta
  - Nana del mar; existe versión para voz y orquesta y para voz y guitarra
  - Nana del sueño; existe versión para voz y orquesta
- 1948 El río feliz para voz y piano (de Arietas de Primavera); existe versión para voz y orquesta y para voz y guitarra
- 1948 Presentimiento para voz y piano (de Cancionero de la enamorada); existe versión para voz y orquesta
- 1948 Clam para voz y piano (Fuera de catálogo)
- 1948 Tú entre los lirios para voz y piano y para voz y orquesta
- 1948 Villancico del pescador de truchas, para voz y piano y para voz y orquesta
- 1949 Ala del silenci, para voz y piano (de Aires de cançó)
- 1950 Tres canciones marineras, para voz y piano
  - Coplilla del marinero
  - El milagro
  - Yo en el fondo del mar (de Homenaje a la poesía femenina de América); existe versión para voz y orquesta
- 1951 Dame la mano, para voz y piano (de Homenaje a la poesía femenina de América)
- 1951 El cazador, para voz y piano (de Homenaje a la poesía femenina de América)
- 1951 La barca milagrosa, para voz y piano (de Homenaje a la poesía femenina de América)
- 1951 Mayo, para voz y piano (de Homenaje a la poesía femenina de América)
- 1951 Seguridad, para voz y piano (Fuera de catálogo)
- 1951 Vida-garfio, para voz y piano (de Homenaje a la poesía femenina de América)
- 1952 En donde tejemos la ronda, para voz y piano (de Homenaje a la poesía femenina de América)
- 1952 Estío seco, para voz y piano
- 1954 El divino amor, para voz y piano (de Homenaje a la poesía femenina de América)
- 1955 Cancionero de la enamorada, ciclo de canciones para voz y piano (1947–1955) (de los números 1 y 4 existe versión para voz y orquesta )
  - Presentimiento
  - Rapto
  - Nostalgia
  - Cancioncilla
- 1955 Tonadilla y danza sefardí, para voz, piano y tabal (Fuera de catálogo)
- 1955 Villancico, para voz y piano (Fuera de catálogo)
- 1956 Homenaje a la poesía femenina de América, ciclo de trece canciones (1946–1956); títulos indicados en el año de composición con las versiones, si es necesario
- 1956 Vidalita y danza criolla, para voz y piano (Fuera de catálogo)
- 1956 Una enredadera, para voz y piano (de Homenaje a la poesía femenina de América)
- 1958 Eu en ti, para voz y piano (de Canciones sobre poetas orensanos)
- 1960 Endecha, para voz y guitarra (de Endechas y cantares de Sepharad); hay versión para voz y piano
- 1960 Yo me levantí un lunes, para voz y guitarra (de Endechas y cantares de Sepharad); hay versión para voz y piano
- 1963 A la vora, voreta, para voz y piano (de Aires de cançó)
- 1963 Abans, amor, para voz y piano (de Aires de cançó)
- 1963 Ara que vens, para voz y piano (de Quatre cançons)
- 1963 Jo faria, para voz y piano (de Aires de cançó)
- 1963 Juguem a jugar, para voz y piano (de Aires de cançó)
- 1963 Per a mi la nit, Senyor, para voz y piano (de Quatre cançons)
- 1963 Si algún dia vols cantar, para voz y piano (de Aires de cançó); existe versión para voz y orquesta
- 1964 Aires de cançó ciclo de canciones para voz y piano (1949–1964); títulos indicados en el año de composición
- 1964 Blava rosa para voz y piano (de Aires de cançó)
- 1964 Cançó del xocorroc, para voz y piano (de Planys, cançons i una nadala)
- 1964 Cançoneta d’abril, para voz y piano (de Planys, cançons i una nadala)
- 1964 Els ulls, para voz y piano (de Quatre cançons)
- 1964 Eriçó, para voz y piano (de Planys, cançons i una nadala)
- 1964 Escampadissa, para voz y piano (de Quatre cançons)
- 1964 Jocs d’aigua, para voz y piano (de Planys, cançons i una nadala)
- 1964 Maror, para voz y piano (de Planys, cançons i una nadala)
- 1964 Nadala, para voz y piano (de Planys, cançons i una nadala)
- 1964 Planys, cançons i una nadala, ciclo de canciones (1945–1964) para voz y piano, títulos indicados en el año de composición
- 1964 Perfum, para voz y piano (Fuera de catálogo)
- 1964 Quatre cançons ciclo de canciones para voz y piano, títulos indicados en el año de composición
- 1964 Recer, para voz y piano (Fuera de catálogo)
- 1966 Cantiga antiga, para voz y piano (de Canciones sobre poetas orensanos)
- 1966 Canciones sobre poetas orensanos ciclo de dos canciones (1958–1966) para voz y piano, títulos indicados en el año de composición
- 1967 Canción del domingo, para voz y piano (de Canciones infantiles)
- 1967 Canción del xilofón, para voz y piano (de Canciones infantiles)
- 1967 Elefante perdido para voz y piano (de Canciones infantiles); existe versión para voz solista, coro de voces blancas, celesta, juego de timbres y piano: también hay versión para coro de voces iguales y para coro de dos voces infantiles
- 1967 El ciempies descalzo, para voz y piano (de Canciones infantiles); existe versión para voz solista, coro de voces blancas, celesta, juego de timbres y piano: también hay versión para coro de voces iguales
- 1967 El grillo, para voz y piano (de Canciones infantiles); existe versión para voz solista, coro de voces blancas, celesta, juego de timbres y piano: también hay versión para coro de voces iguales
- 1967 El puente, para voz y piano (de Canciones infantiles); existe versión para voz solista, coro de voces blancas, celesta, juego de timbres y piano: también hay versión para coro de voces iguales
- 1967 El sapo cantor, para voz y piano (de Canciones infantiles); hay versión para coro de tres voces iguales
- 1967 La gallina presumida, para voz y piano (de Canciones infantiles); hay versión para coro de tres voces iguales
- 1967 Sirenita, para voz y piano (de Canciones infantiles); existe versión para voz solista, coro de voces blancas, celesta, juego de timbres y piano
- 1969 A la una, para voz y guitarra (de Endechas y cantares de Sepharad)
- 1970 1970 Avrideme, galanica, para voz y guitarra (de Endechas y cantares de Sepharad)
- 1971 Arvolicos d’almendra, para voz y guitarra (de Endechas y cantares de Sepharad)
- 1971 Nana del osito, para voz y piano (de Canciones infantiles); hay versión para coro de tres voces iguales
- 1971 Canciones infantiles, ciclo para voz y piano (1967–1971); títulos indicados en su año de composición
- 1971 Los bilbilicos, para voz y guitarra (de Endechas y cantares de Sepharad)
- 1972 Mujeres de Jerusalem, para voz y conjunto instrumental
- 1973 Ecce panis angelorum, eucharistic motet for Corpus Christi for mixed choir a capella
- 1974 Villancico de Las Palmas, para voz y piano; existe versión para voz y conjunto instrumental
- 1975 Cervantinas, ciclo de canciones para voz y piano
  - Ronda de San Juan
  - Marinero soy de amor
  - La inútil guarda
  - Un soneto
  - El papel morisco
  - Villancico Trastocado
  - Canto a los ojos
  - Loa a Valencia
  - La puerta florida
  - Cantarcillo burlesco
- 1979 Cantar de amanecida, para voz y guitarra (de Endechas y cantares de Sepharad)
- 1979 Cantar de marinero, para voz y guitarra (de Endechas y cantares de Sepharad)
- 1979 Endechas y cantares de Sepharad, ciclo de canciones para voz y guitarra (1974–1979); los títulos se indican en el año de composición
- 1982 Cinc cançons de bres, ciclo de canciones para voz y piano (1945–1982)
  - Les campanes
  - La llar
  - Mareta
  - Tan tarantan
  - Dorm!
- 1985 Cants al capvespre, ciclo de canciones para voz y piano
  - Novembre
  - Paisatge nocturn
  - Encara una vegada
  - Vent de Ponent
  - Pels camins del silenci
  - Profunds meandres del no-res
  - Quan m’acomiadaré de tu
- 1986 Calma de mar, para voz y piano
- 1986 Canturel·les de mare, ciclo de canciones para voz y piano
  - Per adormir el grumet
  - El moro Muça
  - Ninc nanc
  - La cuca fera
  - El voladoret
- 1986 Desig, para voz y piano
- 1988 Cantilenes del Roselló, ciclo de canciones para voz y piano (1987–1988)
  - El desig
  - Es el maig
  - La Primavera
  - Els cant d’ocells
  - Tres roses
  - A la font gelada
- 1988 Els Asfòdels, ciclo de canciones para voz y piano (1986–1988)
  - Els asfòdels
  - El temps
  - Miratge de la tarda
  - La cambra
  - Enllà de l’origen
  - Anhel
  - Petit retaule d’amor
- 1988 Per a ninar-te, para voz y piano
- 1995 Ram de núvia, para voz y orquesta de cuerda; existe versión para voz y piano
- 1997 Flor de taronger, para voz y orquesta de cuerda; existe versión para voz y piano
- 1997 Nupcial, para voz y orquesta de cuerda; existe versión para voz y piano
- 1997 L’amor Somniat, para voz y piano
- 1998 Canastrell, para voz y piano
