= Vicente Asencio =

Spanish composer

Vicente Asencio y Ruano (29 October 1908 – 4 April 1979) was a Spanish composer. He is perhaps best known for his works for guitar of which guitarists Andrés Segovia and Narciso Yepes were notable exponents.

== Life ==
Born in Valencia, Asencio began his musical training as a boy with his father. After studying violin in Castellón de la Plana with Emilio Bou, he moved to Barcelona to pursue studies at the Academia Frank Marshall with Frank Marshall and Enric Morera i Viura. He also studied privately in that city with Joaquín Turina and Ernesto Halffter. He also studied conducting in Paris and Milan.

Asencio began composing in the early 1920s, and his first major success was the ballet Fuego de Fiesta (1926). His earlier music displays an evident influence of the composer Manuel de Falla. In 1932 he founded the Conservatorio de Música de Castellón de la Plana with violinist Abel Mus. In 1934 he helped formed the Grupo de los Jóvenes, a group of talented young musicians in Valencia whose members also included Vicente Garcés and Ricardo Olmos among others.

In 1943 Asencio married one of his pupils, the composer and painter Matilde Salvador. They became one of the most influential artistic couples in the Valencia music scene. Asencio, who was technically better prepared than his wife, worked with her in orchestrating many of her works, including her opera Vinatea which premiered at the Liceu in 1974.

In 1953 Asencio joined the music faculty at the Valencia Conservatory where he taught for many years. Among his notable pupils was composer José Evangelista. He died in Valencia after a long illness.

== Music ==
Asencio's best-known works for the guitar are Elegía a Manuel de Falla (1946), Sonatina (1949), Collectici Íntim (1965), and Dipso (1973). He also wrote music for several successful ballets, most notably La casada infiel (1949) which is considered his best work in that genre. A number of the songs from that ballet were later transcribed by the composer for the guitar. He also wrote a considerable amount of orchestral music, including Preludio a la Dama de Elche (1949); Sonada alegre (1954); Llanto a Manuel de Falla (1955), and Danzas Valencianas (1963).

== Sources ==
- Marco, Tomás (1983). Historia de la música española. Siglo XX. Alianza Editorial. ISBN 84-206-8506-2.
- Bernardo Adam Ferrero. Músicos Valencianos. Ed. Proip, S.A. 1988. València. ISBN 84-87179-00-2
- Diversos Autors. Historia de la Música de la Comunidad Valenciana. Editorial Prensa Valenciana, S.A. 1992. ISBN 84-87502-21-0
- Article Asencio Ruano, Vicente de l' Enciclopedia de la Comunidad Valenciana. Editorial Prensa Valenciana. València, 2005. ISBN 84-87502-56-3
