= Santos Hernández Rodríguez =

Spanish luthier (1874–1943)

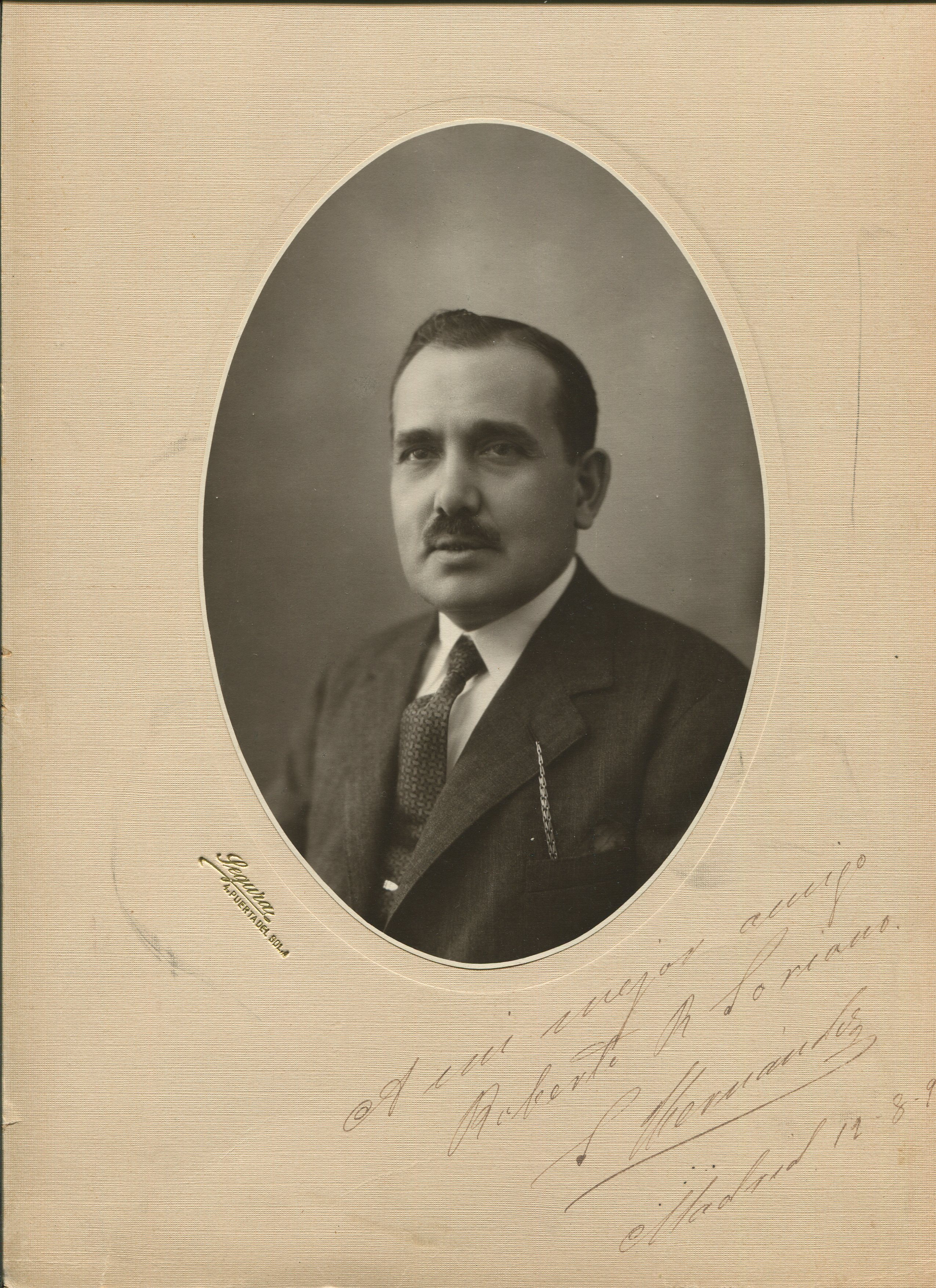
- Santos Hernández Rodríguez
- Born: 1874; Madrid, Spain
- Died: March 8, 1943; Madrid, Spain
- Occupation: Luthier

Santos Hernández Rodríguez (Madrid, Spain, 1874 – Madrid, Spain, March 8, 1943) was a Spanish luthier, known for manufacturing classical and flamenco guitars.

== Life ==
Born in Madrid in 1873, Hernández began his career in luthiery at the age of 10, as an apprentice to Valentín Viudes. Later, he refined his skills under the mentorship of renowned luthiers such as Rafael Ortega and Saturnino Rojas.

In 1905, Hernández joined the workshop of Manuel Ramírez, a prominent Spanish guitar maker, where he worked as a foreman. During this period, he built the famous 1912 guitar by Manuel Ramírez, which was used by Andrés Segovia and played a crucial role in popularizing the Spanish guitar internationally.

In 1921, Hernández established his own workshop in Madrid, marking a new chapter in his career. His guitars, known for their precision and tonal excellence, attracted celebrated musicians such as Andrés Segovia, Miguel Llobet, Regino Sainz de la Maza and Ramón Montoya. His designs significantly influenced the traditions of classical and flamenco guitar making.

Hernández's instruments gained wide acclaim, standing out in notable performances, such as the premiere of Joaquín Rodrigo's "Concierto de Aranjuez" in 1940.

== Legacy ==
Hernández died on March 18, 1943, in Madrid. After his death, his widow, Matilde Ruiz López, briefly managed his workshop, preserving his legacy. His instruments remain highly valued by collectors and musicians.

The Center for the Vihuela and the Spanish Guitar, located in Sigüenza, Guadalajara, houses a reconstruction of the workshop of Santos Hernández Rodríguez.
