= Manuel Ramírez (guitar maker) =

Spanish guitar maker

Manuel Ramírez (1864 - 25 February 1916) was a Spanish luthier.

== Early life ==
Ramírez whose full formal name was 'Manuel Ramírez de Galarreta y Planet' was born in 1864 in Alhama in Aragon, Spain to José Ramírez de Galarreta, a very well-off land owner. His father José Ramírez de Galarreta had been born in Salvatierra and had originally come to Madrid to work for the Marques de Salamanca who was a property developer responsible for the Barrio del Salamanca, an upmarket area of Madrid.

When his older brother José Ramírez opened his guitar making workshop in Madrid in 1882, Manuel joined him.

== Founding of his own workshop ==
In 1891 Ramírez decided to move to Paris and establish himself there, to which his brother José offered his support. However, for unknown reasons, Ramírez changed his plans, and decided instead to start his own workshop in Madrid, which would be in direct competition with his brother. This caused a lasting enmity between the brothers and they never spoke again. Ramírez opened his workshop at Cava Baja nº 24, before relocating to Plaza de Santa Ana nº 5, and in 1897 to Calle Arlabán nº 10 where he remained until 1912, before moving next door to nº 11. Enrique Garcia (1868-1922) who began an apprenticeship with José Ramírez in 1883 joined Manuel Ramírez. The workshop took some time to attract customers which lead Ramírez to bring in income by working for a period as an electrician for the Madrid Electric Company, leaving the workshop in the hands of Garcia. The business also made violins as well. In 1893 Manuel won a medal at that year's Chicago Fair.

Manuel Ramírez's style of guitar followed the ideas of Antonio Torres and came to be regarded as his successor, yet at the same time he inquisitively experimented and further developed Torres's ideas. As a result he began producing guitars that had a lighter delicate sound, that became popular within the flamenco community. As well as Enrique Garcia among the luthiers that Ramírez trained were Antonio Emilio Pascual Viudes, Domingo Esteso (1882–1937) and Modesto Borreguero (1893-1969) who became his apprentice at the age of 12.

Manuel Ramírez was also regarded as an excellent maker of violins. In 1895 Enrique Garcia left his position as Ramírez 's foreman to move to Barcelona to establish his own workshop. Ramirez subsequently hired Santos Hernandez (1873 - 1943) in about 1905 as foreman. By 1912 Manuel Ramírez had been appointed luthier to the National Conservatoire in Madrid.

== Andrés Segovia and the 1912 ==
In 1912 a young Andrés Segovia visited Ramírez with a request to rent a guitar for a concert at the Ateneo de Madrid. as he had been finding that the guitar made by Benito Ferrer of Granada which he had been using up until then was proving insufficient. After hearing him play Ramírez gave him the guitar, which had been largely made by Hernandez and originally intended for Antonio Jiménez Manjón. Segovia used the guitar in concerts and on recordings from 1912 to 1937 and played it at his United States debut in the New York Town Hall in 1929. After the guitar developed a crack Segovia switched to using a guitar made by Hermann Hauser. These performances bought Manuel Ramírez's style of guitar and Hernandez's skill to the notice of other players. The guitar that Ramírez gave Segovia was gifted by Segovia's widow, Emilita to the Metropolitan Museum of Art in New York, where it now resides.

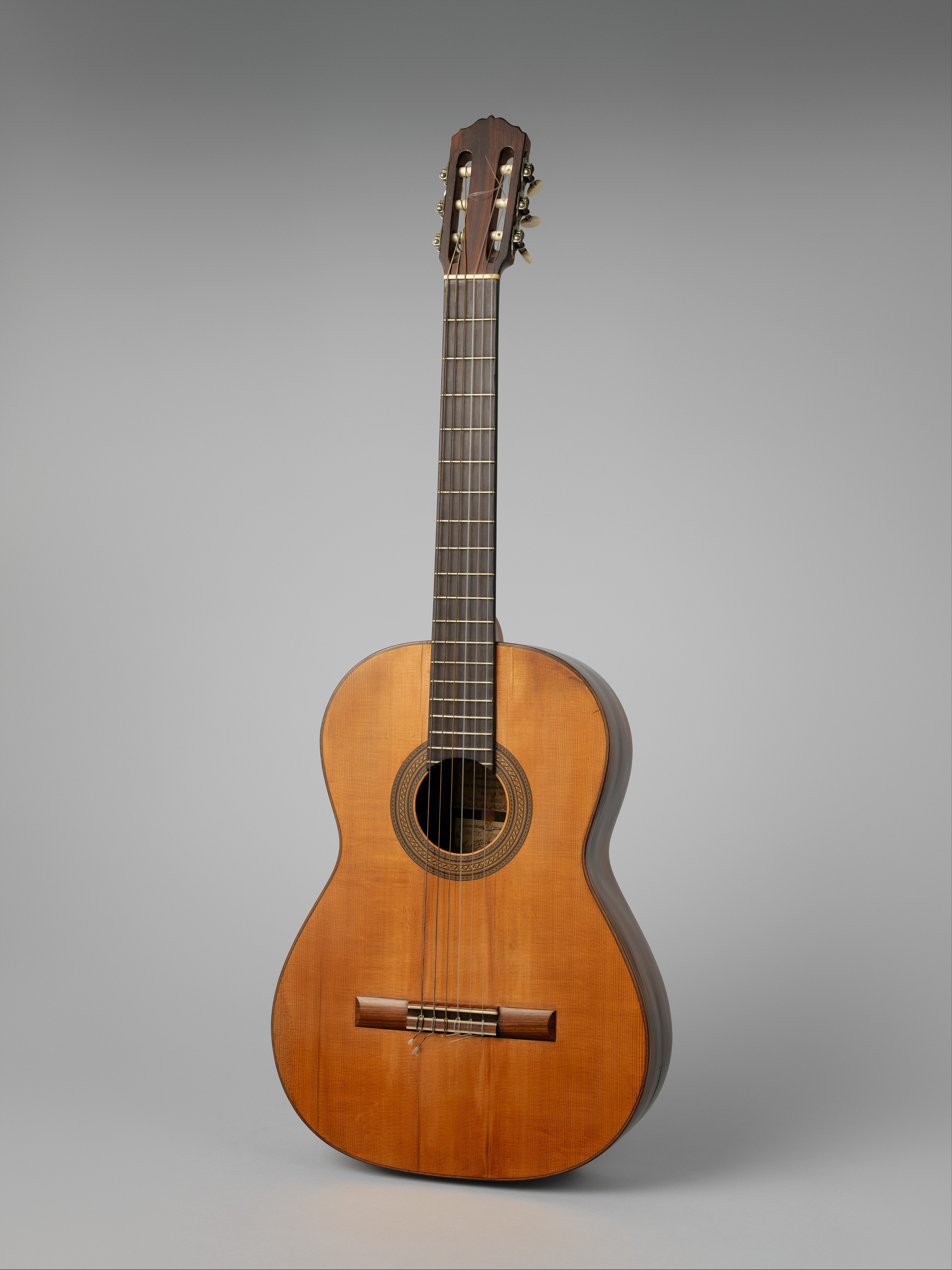
The guitar given by Manuel Ramírez to Andrés Segovia in 1912. It is now in the Metropolitan Museum of Art.

== Death ==
Manuel Ramírez died on 25 February 1916 leaving no offspring. Following his death Borreguero planned to open his own workshop, and even had labels printed, but changed his plans after Ramírez’s widow asked him as well as Esteso and Hernandez to stay. The instruments made during this period carry the Vuida de Manuel Ramírez (widow of) label. Esteso left in 1917 to establish his own workshop followed by Hernandez in 1920. Hernandez went on to become one of the greatest guitar makers of the first half of the 20th century Borreguero continued working for the workshop despite the death of Ramírez’s widow in 1921, until the business finally closed around 1923.

== Legacy ==
In the early 1990s his brother's great-grand children, Amalia and Jose IV Ramírez visited the Metropolitan Museum of Art in New York where they extensively studied, and measured the 1912 guitar. From what they learned Ramírez Guitars created a handcrafted limited edition reproduction the first of the projected 30 in the series was introduced to the market in 2003.

== Notable users of Ramírez guitars ==
Among the artists who have used Manuel Ramírez 's guitars have been:

- Francisco Calleja
- González Campos
- Andrés Segovia

== See also ==
- Classical guitar making
