= Oscar Herrero =

Spanish flamenco guitarist

Óscar Herrero is a Flamenco guitarist from Spain. He was born in Tomelloso (Ciudad Real) on 12 March 1959.

Oscar Herrero has authored several flamenco guitar teaching DVDs and didactic textbooks. Among them:

== Works ==
Text books

- Tratado de la Guitarra Flamenca Vol. 1 - Techniques
- Tratado de la Guitarra Flamenca Vol. 2 - Advanced Techniques
- Tratado de la Guitarra Flamenca Vol. 3 - La Soleá and La Siguiriya
- Tratado de la Guitarra Flamenca Vol. 4 - Los Fandangos and Los Tangos
- Tratado de la Guitarra Flamenca Vol. 5 - Bulería
- Tratado de la Guitarra Flamenca Repertorio - Various traditional palo pieces by Diego del Gastor, Manolo de Huelva, Perico el del Lunar and Melchor de Marchena.

DVDs

- Flamenco Guitar Step by Step. Volume 1 - Techniques
- Flamenco Guitar Step by Step. Volume 2 - Techniques
- Flamenco Guitar Step by Step. Volume 3 - Techniques
- Flamenco Guitar Step by Step - La Soleá. Volume 4
- Flamenco Guitar Step by Step - La Soleá. Volume 5
- Flamenco Guitar Step by Step - La Soleá - Acompañamiento al cante . Volume 6
- Flamenco Guitar Step by Step - La Alegría. Volume 7
- Flamenco Guitar Step by Step - La Alegría. Volume 8
- Flamenco Guitar Step by Step - La Alegría - Acompañamiento al cante. Volume 9

He was awarded the first prize at the Bordón Minero (Festival de La Union, Murcia) and the Premio Nacional de Guitarra Flamenca in Jerez de la Frontera, Cádiz. He has been appointed “Special Prize for Flamenco Teaching “Festival de las Minas”.

== Discography ==
Year	Title	Label	Other information
1995	Torrente	-	Audio CD
1996	Por Falla	-	Audio CD
1998	Hechizo	-	Audio CD
2005	Abantos	-	Audio Double CD
