= Paulino Bernabe Senior =

Spanish luthier

Paulino Bernabe Senior (2 July 1932 – 10 May 2007) was a Spanish luthier.

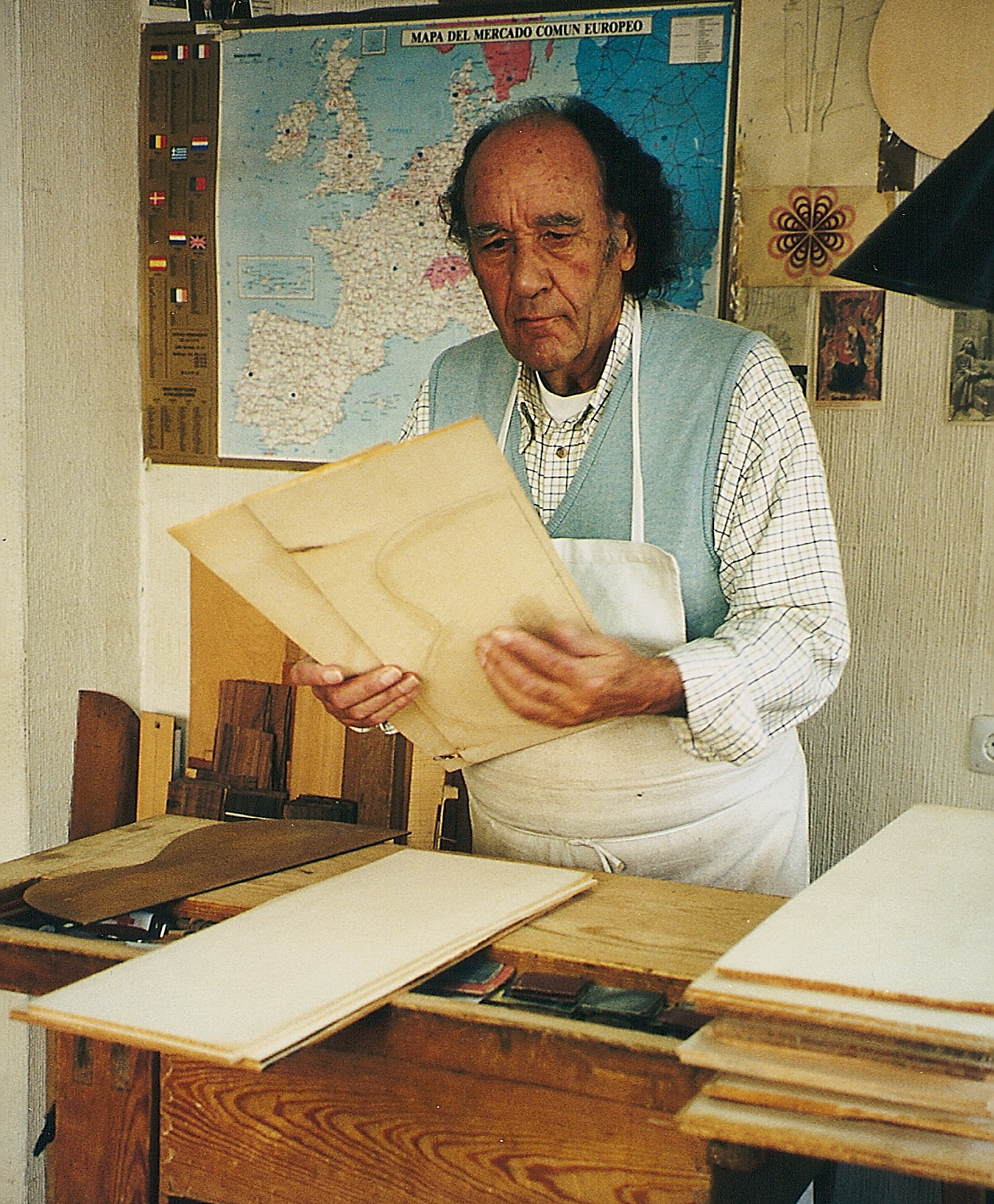
The Spanisch luthier Paulino Bernabe (Senior) in his workshop in Madrid (Spain). October 2000.

== Life ==
Born in Madrid, Paulino Bernabé received music lessons from Daniel Fortea, a pupil of Francisco Tárrega, and then learned the art of making classical guitars from José Ramírez III. After opening his first own workshop in 1969 he developed an individual strutting system for the interior of his instruments. Since the early 1980s until shortly before his death in 2007 the master worked together with his son Paulino Bernabe II, who took over the workshop from his father.

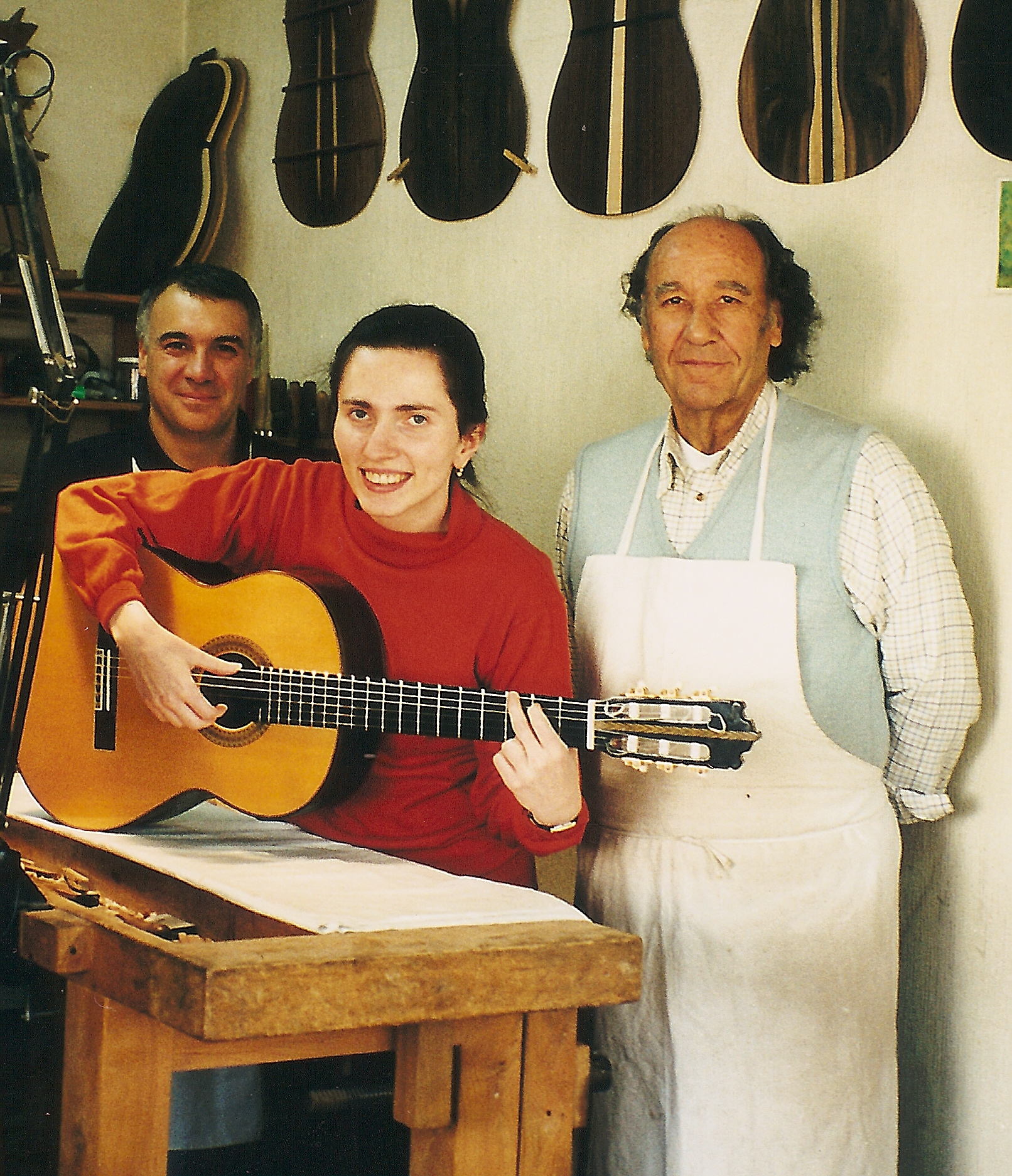
The Austrian classical guitarist Johanna Beisteiner (middle) in the workshop of Spanish luthiers Paulino Bernabe Senior (right) and Junior (left). Madrid (Spain), October 2000

Instruments made by Paulino Bernabe Senior were and are played by internationally know guitarists, inter alia by Narciso Yepes, Johanna Beisteiner and Alexandre Lagoya.

== Awards ==
1974 Bernabe was awarded the Gold Medal at the International Crafts Exhibition in Munich (Germany).

== Samples ==
- Videos of the Austrian classical guitarist Johanna Beisteiner played on a classical guitar made by Paulino Bernabe
