= José Ramírez (luthier) =

Spanish luthier (1858–1923)

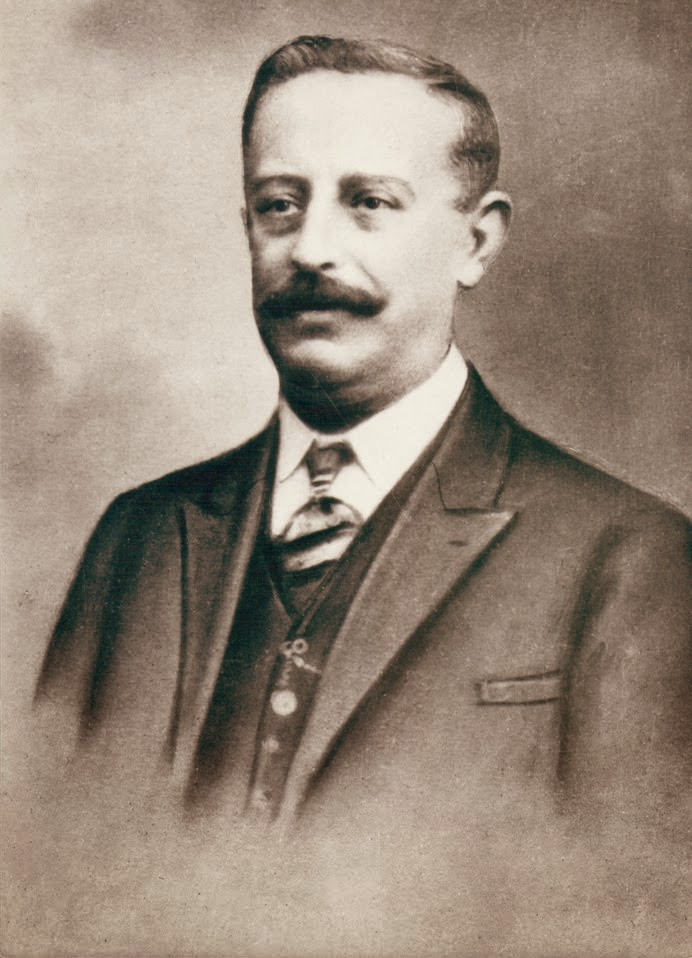
José Ramírez

José Ramírez (1858–1923) was a Spanish luthier, the founder of Ramírez Guitars and of the Spanish luthier dynasty who continue to run it. His grandson José Ramírez III was in turn head of the company, and a noted innovator who made significant changes to the classical guitar.

== Early life ==
Ramírez was the first child of José Ramírez de Galarreta, a very well-off land owner. In 1870, he became apprenticed to Francisco Gonzalez (1830–1880). In 1890, he opened his shop in Madrid; Ramírez Guitars would continue to operate from these premises until 1995.

Ramírez' work generally followed the designs of Antonio Torres (1817–1892) in all respects except one: He produced a larger flamenco guitar known as the tablao guitar. Both this innovation and the quality of his guitars generally were favourably received, but he is chiefly remembered as the founder of the dynasty of luthiers and the guitar manufacturing company that still bears his name.

Several other luthiers learned the art of making classical guitars from José Ramírez, inter alia Paulino Bernabe Senior.

== See also ==
- Classical guitar making
