= José Ramírez III =

Spanish luthier (1922–1995)

José Ramírez III (1922–1995) was a Spanish luthier. He was head of Ramírez Guitars from the death of his father in 1957, until 1988, and was responsible for major changes both to the company and to the classical guitars it produces.

Ramírez was raised in a guitar making family, and served his luthier's apprenticeship in the family business founded by his grandfather, José Ramírez, and by then run by his father José II. During and in the aftermath of the Spanish Civil War material shortages forced them to experiment, and the young José developed a love of innovation. But this was also a frustrating time for him; Frequently, his father sold his work with little if any documentation as to the construction, the results, or the buyer.

In 1954, his brother Alfredo, who had been doing the administrative work of the family business, died, followed three years later by their father, forcing Ramírez to give up guitar making for a time to supervise the business. Undeterred, he committed his designs to paper for journeymen to make.

Ramírez worked closely with top performers, which brought acceptance to his innovations. In Andrés Segovia, whom he first met in 1952, he found a performer who was like him passionate about achieving greater volume and clarity, to allow the classical guitar to be accompanied by a full symphony orchestra. Daring to tamper with the designs of Torres, Ramírez built larger and more powerful concert guitars, with longer scale lengths and asymmetrical bracing. Both of these innovations, and many others, are standard today. Segovia was an uncompromising customer, but when Ramírez' designs gave him what he wanted, an unsurpassable supporter.

An important innovation attributed to Jose Ramirez III was the use of Western Red Cedar (Thuja Plicata) for the soundboard of the guitar. Up to that time, and since, spruce has been commonly used. Although there are records of the use of cedar in the 1950s, it did not become widely popular until Ramirez adopted it in about 1962.

More radical still, in 1963 Ramírez built a ten-string guitar for Narciso Yepes, to accommodate Yepes' unique chromatically balanced tuning. Later he developed an eight-string guitar for José Tomás. He also experimented with different woods and varnishes and countless other major and minor innovations.

In the 1960s, to cope with increasing demand, Ramírez moved his workshop to its own building, and greatly expanded the number of employees, leaving the original premises as a shop only. He continued to supervise every aspect of the business until 1988, when he passed control to his children José IV (also known as José Enrique Ramírez García or just José Enrique) and Amalia, both themselves by then guitar makers.

He continued to experiment until the end of his life, and to collaborate with top performers, including younger performers and those from other musical traditions. With Marcel Dadi, he designed a classical guitar with a cutaway body, still in production. In 1983, he designed the "camara" guitar, with the intention of eliminating the wolf notes.

Ramírez trained more than a generation of journeymen, many of them becoming top-ranking luthiers with their own establishments, and including his own children José IV and Amalia. In 1979, the company sent a number of its finest guitars to Segovia, from which he chose one which as it happened was to be the guitar he would use for the rest of his life. The one he chose was by José Ramírez IV. He had learned well, but he had a peerless teacher.

In 1962, Ramírez was awarded the gold medal of the Guitar Society in Chicago. In 1968, he was elected Honorary Partner of the Centre Culturale de la Chitarra in Rome; In 1972 he received the Bronze medal award by the Official Chamber of Commerce and Industry of Madrid, gold medal to the exemplary Artisan of the Union Work of Craft; And in 1983 was made an Honorary Partner of Música en Compostela. There followed in 1987 the Diapason d'Or from the Ministry of Education and Culture of France, but to the end of his life the award he most cherished was a letter from Andrés Segovia acknowledging his work.

== See also ==
- Classical guitar making
