= Domingo Esteso =

Spanish luthier

Domingo Esteso (1882–1937) was a luthier who trained under Manuel Ramírez. His nephews, Faustino, Mariano and Julio Conde inherited his workshop and changed the name to Conde Hermanos. Nowadays, the family tradition established by Domingo Esteso is being continued at their workshops in central Madrid by Felipe Conde at 4 Arrieta St., Mariano Conde at 1 Amnistia St. next to Ópera metro station and Julio Conde's sons and granddaughter at 53 Atocha St.

Esteso concentrated almost exclusively on building flamenco-style guitars, and his instruments are renowned for their physical lightness, yet very strong volume and sound-projection. A crack-free and undamaged example can cost several tens of thousands, either Euros or dollars. However, the majority of remaining Estesos have mostly been repaired. Due to the age and fragility of the instruments and the firm, often percussive playing-style associated with flamenco.

== See also ==
- Classical guitar making
