= Vidović =

Vidović or Vidovich (Cyrillic script: Видовић) is a South Slavic surname, particularly common in Croatia, with 6,838 carriers (2011 census).

In Croatia, it is a common surname in the middle and south Dalmatia, Međimurje, Požega, Zagorje and Banovina.

It is formed by the patronymic suffix -ić, the possessive infix -ov- and the base Vid (given name).

Its one of the Noble surnames in Croatia. Noble Families of Croatia

The surname may refer to:

- Albin Vidović (1943–2018), Croatian handball player
- Ana Vidović (born 1980), Croatian guitar player
- Auggie Vidovich II (born 1981), American racing driver
- Branko Vidović (1923–2013), Croatian swimmer
- Emanuel Vidović (1870–1953), Croatian painter and graphic artist
- Gabriel Vidović (born 2003), Croatian footballer
- Gordan Vidović (born 1968), Croatian footballer
- Ivica Vidović (1939–2011), Croatian actor
- Jay Vidovich (born 1960), American soccer coach
- Jovan Vidović (born 1989), Slovenian footballer
- Lazar Vidovic (born 1965), Australian footballer
- Marko Vidović (born 1988), Montenegrin footballer
- Matej Vidović (born 1993), Croatian alpine skier
- Miloš Vidović (born 1989), Serbian footballer
- Mirko Vidović (1940–2016), Croatian-French writer
- Nikola Vidović (born 1964), Croatian sports instructor
- Rajko Vidović (born 1975), Croatian footballer
- Renzo de' Vidovich (1934–2024), Italian politician, historian, and journalist
- Saša Vidović (born 1982), Bosnian Serb footballer
- Sladjana Vidovic (1992–2008), Croatian American student
- Uroš Vidović (born 1994), Serbian footballer
- Viktor Vidović (born 1973), Croatian classical guitar player
- Izabela Vidovic (born 2001), American Actor

== See also ==
- Vidovići (Bosansko Grahovo)
