= Op. 61 =

In music, Op. 61 stands for Opus number 61. Compositions that are assigned this number include:

- Beethoven – Violin Concerto
- Britten – Sechs Hölderlin-Fragmente
- Chopin – Polonaise-Fantaisie
- Dvořák – String Quartet No. 11
- Elgar – Violin Concerto
- Giuliani - Grand Overture
- Rautavaara – Cantus Arcticus
- Saint-Saëns – Violin Concerto No. 3
- Sallinen – Kullervo
- Schumann – Symphony No. 2
- Shostakovich – Piano Sonata No. 2
- Spohr – String Quartet No. 18
- Tchaikovsky – Orchestral Suite No. 4 Mozartiana
