= Grand Overture =

The Grande Overture, Op. 61, or Grande Ouverture is a single-movement concert piece for solo guitar by the Italian guitarist-composer Mauro Giuliani (1781–1829). One of his most acclaimed and popular works, it was his first to be printed outside Vienna, and has become part of the standard classical guitar repertory. It has been described as combining early-19th-century Viennese Classical style with guitar-specific performance techniques. Typical performances last roughly eight to nine minutes.

Giuliani's Grande Overture is conventionally dated to 1809, and appears in 19th-century printed plate copies and modern critical editions. According to Serenade Magazine, the piece "showcases Giuliani's virtuosic flair and melodic charm". The piece has been described as a "diverse and intricate task for classical guitar musicians, as it involves a complex interweaving of technical elements, profound emotional expression, and intricate structural components.

The Rast Musicology Journal noted that the piece is a test of mastery of the guitar itself, due to the fact that it "encompasses the intricate nuances of articulation, dynamics, timbre, and even ventures into the special effects such as harmonics."

== Notable performers ==
- Julian Bream
- David Russell
- Anabel Montesinos
- Ana Vidovic
