= Vidošić =

Vidošić is a Croatian surname. Notable people with the surname include:

- Dario Vidošić (born 1987), Australian soccer player
- Rado Vidošić (1961–2026), Croatian-born Australian soccer manager

== See also ==
- Vidović
