= Anabel Montesinos =

Spanish classical guitarist and recording artist

- Born: 1984 (age 40–41); L'Hospitalet de l'Infant, Catalonia, Spain
- Education: Mozarteum; Anton Bruckner Privatuniversität
- Occupations: Classical guitarist; Academic teacher
- Organizations: Conservatori Superior de Música del Liceu
- Awards: Francisco Tárrega International Guitar Competition

Anabel Montesinos (born 1984) is a Spanish classical guitarist, recording artist and a professor at the Conservatori Superior de Música del Liceu in Barcelona. At the age of 17 she won the Francisco Tárrega International Guitar Competition, and she has since performed in concert halls and with orchestras globally, making her debut at Carnegie Hall in 2011. She has released several albums on the Naxos Records label.

== Early life and education ==
Montesinos was born in L'Hospitalet de l'Infant, a suburb of Tarragona in Catalonia, in 1984. She began her musical education as a child in the Tarragona area, attending local music schools before continuing at the Conservatory of Tarragona and the Conservatory of Alicante. She pursued advanced studies in Austria, including at the Mozarteum in Salzburg and the Anton Bruckner Privatuniversität in Linz, where she completed a Magister degree.

== Career ==
Montesinos first gained international attention as a teenager after winning several major competitions. She won the Castellón Francisco Tárrega competition in 1999, the Krynica International Competition in Poland the following year, and won the Francisco Tárrega International Guitar Competition at the age of 17 in 2002, becoming one of the youngest laureates of that competition. She is the recipient of more than ten first prizes at international competitions in Europe, including the Italian Michele Pittaluga International Classical Guitar Competition.

As a soloist she has performed internationally on major stages and with orchestras, including performances with the Turin Philharmonic (Italy), the Simón Bolívar Symphony Orchestra (Venezuela), the Oulu Symphony Orchestra (Finland), the National Symphony Orchestra of Cuba and the Moscow Philharmonic. Montesinos made a recital debut at Carnegie Hall in New York City in 2011. Her repertoire ranges from Baroque and Romantic works to Spanish repertoire such as Rodrigo's Concierto de Aranjuez, to modern arrangements of classic rock pieces, such as by Queen and The Beatles. In June 2016, she appeared in a recital at Boston GuitarFest, performing works such as Mauro Giuliani's Grand Overture, Op. 61, and Enrique Granados's Valses Poéticos. In 2025, she toured with violinist Linus Roth and two flamenco dancers to European festivals such as the Rheingau Musik Festival.

She has released recordings on the Naxos Records label, including a recital album in the Naxos Laureate Series in 2003. A reviewer of the collection, containing rarely played music, described her as having a "highly refined" touch, and melodic lines with a "special singing quality." A reviewer wrote for Gramophone: "In the exquisite shaping of her lines by the use of rubato (both short- and long-range) and dynamic shading she shows a maturity beyond her tender age." She has played guitars by the Australian luthier Simon Marty and by Stephan Connor from Massachusetts.

Montesinos has taught as professor of guitar at the Conservatori Superior de Música del Liceu in Barcelona from the 2024/25 term.
