= Ricardo Iznaola =

Ricardo Iznaola (born February 21, 1949) is an American guitarist, music educator, composer, and arranger of Cuban birth.

== Life and career ==
Born Ricardo Fernández-Iznaola in Havana, Cuba, Izanola moved with his family to Colombia after the Cuban Revolution. The family eventually relocated to Venezuela where Izanola studied under guitarist Manuel Enrique Pérez Díaz at the Escuela Superior de Música José Ángel Lamas in Caracas. He later studied with Regino Sainz de la Maza in Madrid and Alirio Díaz in Caracas. He won first prize at the Francisco Tárrega International Guitar Competition in 1968 and again in 1971.

In 1969 Iznaola performed for the first time internationally, touring Asia, Europe and North and South America. In 1970 he made the first of many recordings; mostly performing music by Spanish and South American composers. In 1976 he performed in London for the first time. In 1980 he moved to the United States; ultimately becomes an American citizen.

Iznaola joined the faculty of the Lamont School of Music at the University of Denver as a professor of guitar in 1983. He served for many years as the Chair of the Guitar and Harp Department at that institution and served as Director of the Conservatory Program. In 1990 he was awarded the Distinguished Faculty Artist Award and in 2004 he was named a Distinguished University Professor; the highest honor given by that institution to its faculty. Upon his retirement in June 2015, he was named a Professor Emeritus.

As a writer, composer, and arranger, Iznaola has published numerous journal articles and compositions and arrangement for the guitar. He is the author of four books on the guitar, including Kitharologus: the Path to Virtuosity (Heidelberg, 1993) and On Practising (Aurora, CO, 1992).

In 2016 he was inducted into the Guitar Foundation of America's Hall of Fame.
