= L'Hospitalet de l'Infant =

Suburb of Tarragona in Catalonia, Spain

Coordinates: 40°59′30.43″N 0°55′20.33″E

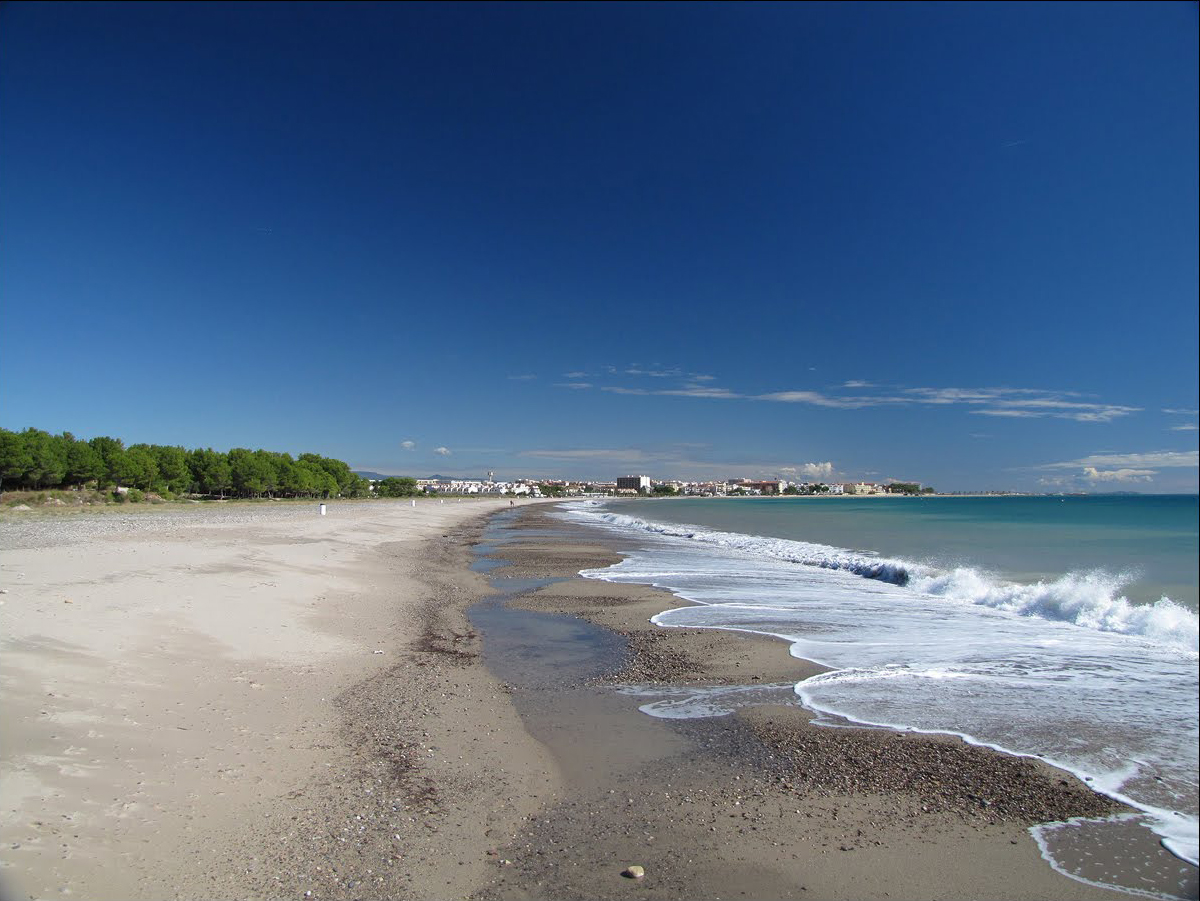
L'Arenal beach

L'Hospitalet de l'Infant, Catalonia, Spain is coastal suburb of Tarragona, inside the municipality of Vandellòs i l'Hospitalet de l'Infant and southwest of Baix Camp.

The town center is on a rocky promontory flanked by an extensive beach ("L'Arenal") and crossed by the Llastres River. Tourism is one of the main economic activities of the town and the area represented by the regional brand Costa Daurada. The Local tourism brand is "L’Hospitalet de l’Infant i la Vall de Llors", which has three beaches: L'Arenal, La Punta del Riu, and El Torn. All are certified Blue Flag beaches.

The GR 92 long distance footpath, which roughly follows the length of the Mediterranean coast of Spain, has a staging point at L'Hospitalet de l'Infant. Stage 27 links northwards to Cambrils, a distance of 16.3 kilometres (10.1 mi), whilst stage 28 links southwards to L'Ametlla de Mar, a distance of 22.8 kilometres (14.2 mi).

== History ==
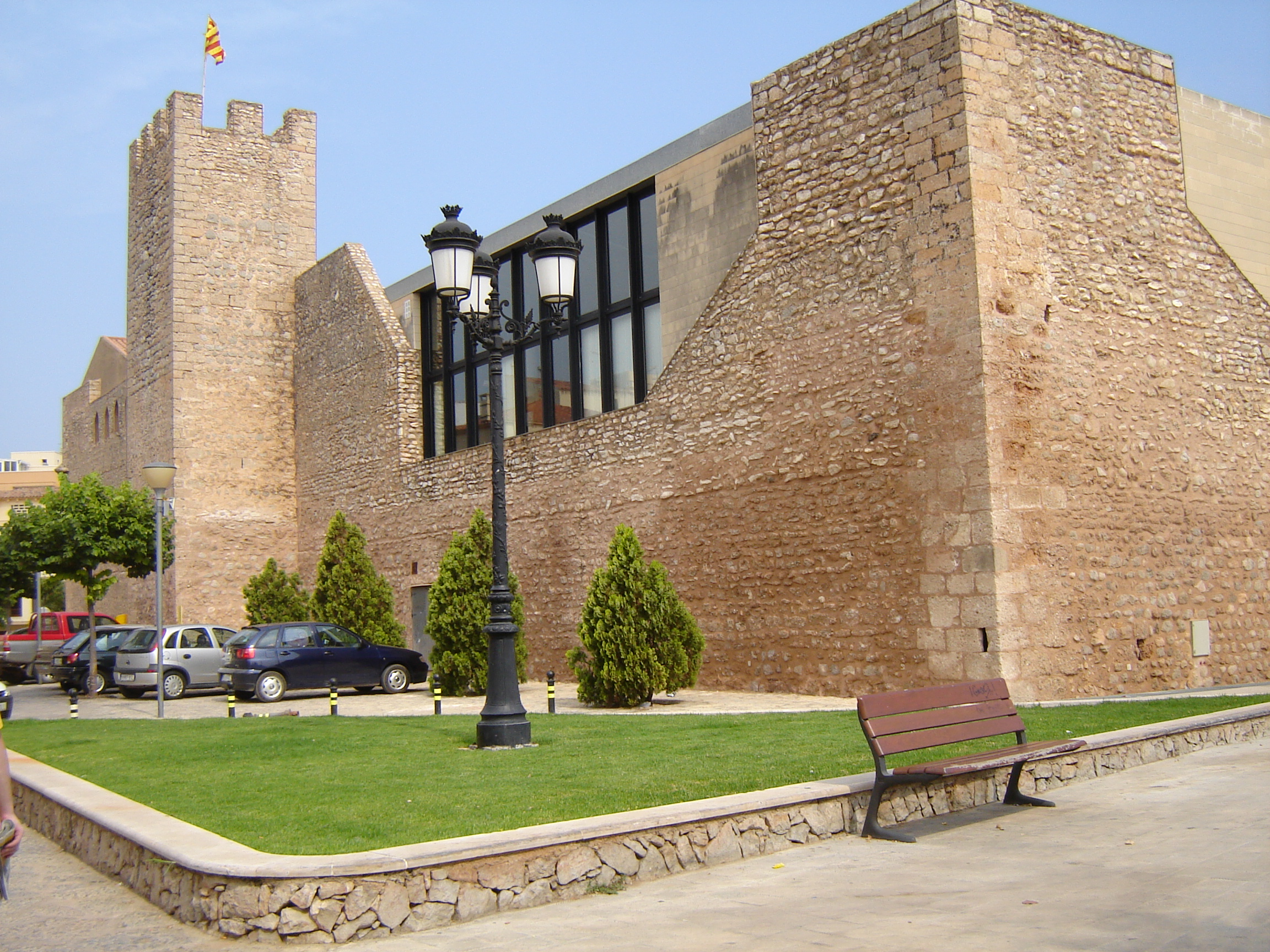
Hospitalet de l'Infant - Medieval Hospital

Atop the hill lies the remains of Coll de Balaguer, a fourteenth-century hospital for which the town is named. Ancient Roman authors Antoninus and Strabo also mention a mansion Oleastrum, accommodating travelers on the Via Augusta Roman (Barcelona-Valencia Road). The mansion is believed to have been located at the same site, and lends its name to the Llastres (Catalan Ullastres, from Latin Oleaster; Avienius describes an "Oleum flumen" in his Ora maritima).

The Gothic hospital was built in 1344 at the command of the child Pedro of Aragon and Anjou shortly after his investiture in 1341 as Lord of Prades and Baron of Entença. Pedro sought in part to establish more permanent housing for the pilgrims and beggars along the road, but also to construct a fortress that would reduce the then-frequent attacks by corsairs.

=== "The Child's Hospital" ===
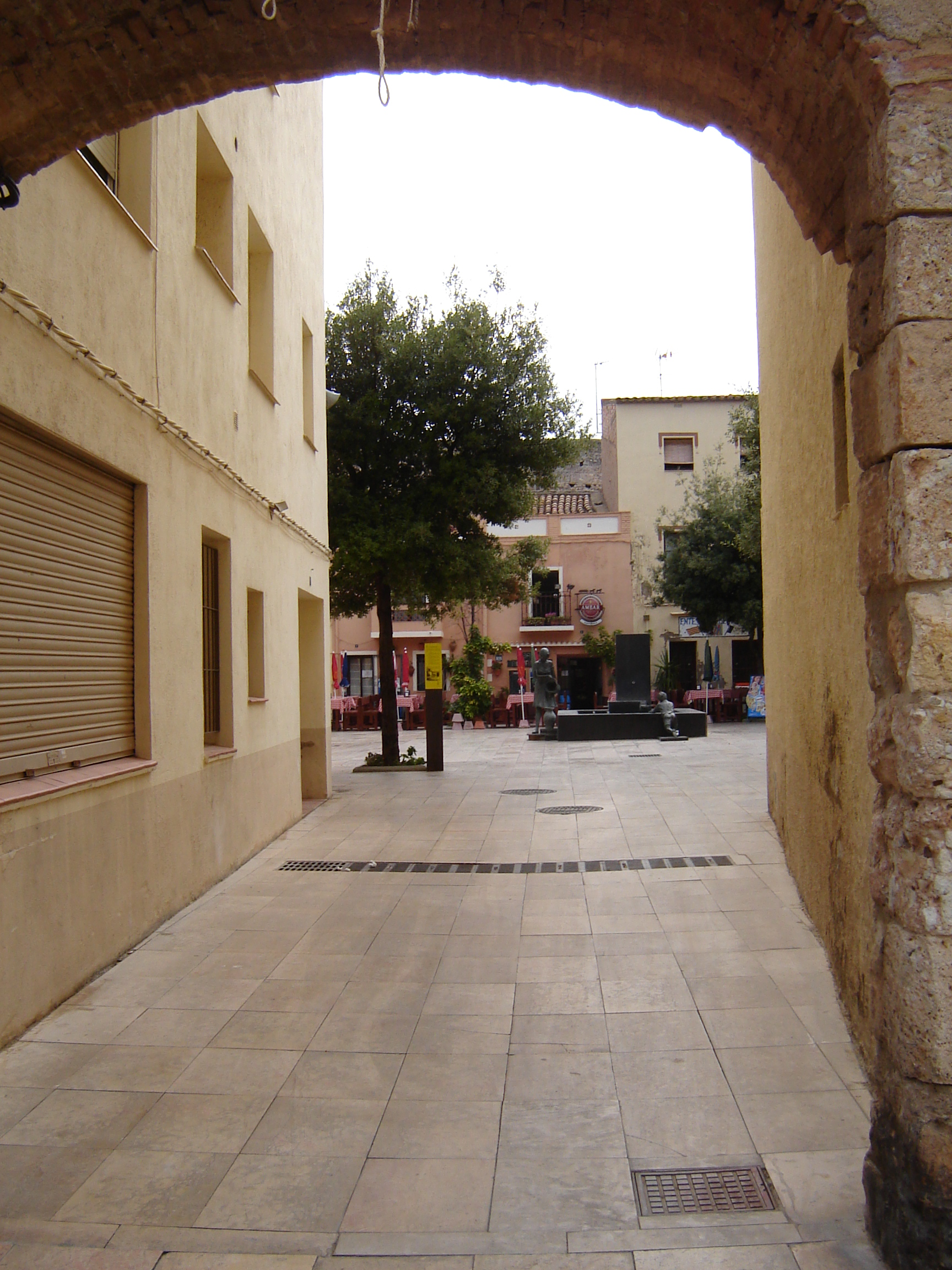
Hospitalet de l'Infant - well square

The building is an excellent example of Catalan Gothic civil architecture, with a 55 sq meter-area central courtyard, flanked by four towers. Each side leads to a nave through an arched door with wooden lintel; main access was by the existing door to the southern tower, not the current access that leads to the Plaza Berenguer de Entença. The central courtyard has been modernized substantially; historically, the plaza featured a treadwheel-powered well.

The fortified nature of the building is reflected in 11.7-meter thick walls and 18-meter high towers. Surviving plans suggest that originally six towers were planned: one in each corner and two in the middle of the northern and southern walls, but only four were ultimately constructed. The building has no windows, except for remnants in the north-east and loopholes present around the perimeter.

The building was an important fortification in the Catalan Civil War, and the site of the 1640 battle of Coll de Balaguer in the Reapers' War. The building was most seriously damaged in the Peninsular War. As a hostel, the structure remained in use by travelers until the nineteenth century. The current historical site maintains four raised towers, the entrance to the Plaça del Pou, three facades and three gothic arches behind the patios of the houses inside.

== Sant Roc Festivity and Hermitage ==
The Festival of Sant Roc is held on August 14–18. On the last day, there is a popular 5-km hike to the hermitage of Sant Roc located about 200 m above sea level. This building is located on the peak of the Serra del Mestral mountains, and offers splendid views of the town and its coastline.

== Notable people ==
- Anabel Montesinos (born 1984) - classical guitarist and educator
