= International Czesław Droździewicz Guitar Competition =

Biennal Polish classic guitar competition

The International Czesław Droździewicz Guitar Competition (Polish: Międzynarodowy Konkurs Gitarowy im. Czesława Droździewicza), also known as Krynica Guitar Festival or Krynica International Competition, is a biennial classical guitar competition held in Krynica-Zdrój, Poland, under the patronage of the late Polish guitarist and educator Czesław Droździewicz.

The competition is held in association with the International Guitar Festival named for Droździewicz, which provides a platform for young guitarists to perform publicly, benefit from master‑classes and workshops, and gain visibility in the classical guitar community.

== History ==
The origins of the event trace back to 1985, when Czesław Droździewicz founded the “Krakowskie Dni Muzyki Gitarowej” (Krakow Guitar Music Days) in Kraków. Between 1985 and 2002 the event was organised by the Kraków Cultural Centre. In 1994, the event underwent a reorganisation following the death of Droździewicz, and from 1995 the competition and festival bore his name as patron.

Since 2002, the festival and competition have been overseen by the Fryderyk Chopin State Primary and Secondary Music School in Nowy Sącz and the Nowy Sącz Music Society. From 2010 onward the festival and competition have been organised on a biennial basis rather than annually.

In 2020, Zbigniew Dubiella was appointed the artistic director. The XX edition of the contest took place from 22 to 27 February 2020 in Krynica‑Zdrój.

== Notable winners ==
- 2000 - Anabel Montesinos
