= Francisco Tárrega International Guitar Competition =

The Francisco Tárrega International Guitar Competition (Certamen Internacional de Guitarra Francisco Tárrega) is a prestigious annual classical guitar contest held in Benicàssim, Spain, since 1967.

Named after the renowned Spanish composer and guitarist Francisco Tárrega (1852–1909), the competition aims to promote his works and support emerging guitar talent. Classical guitarists who have won the competition include Ricardo Iznaola (1968 and 1971), David Russell (1977), Ana Vidović (1998), Anabel Montesinos (2002), Adriano Del Sal (2009), Marko Topchii (2021) and Álvaro Toscano (2025)

== History ==
Established in 1967, the competition was founded to honor Spanish composer and guitarist Francisco Tárrega and to encourage the performance of his compositions. It is one of the oldest guitar competitions in Europe.

The 2025 competition was held from 28 August to 5 September 2025.

== Competition structure ==
The competition is open to guitarists of all nationalities, with participants required to be under the age of 36 at the time of the competition. Past first-prize winners are not eligible to compete again. The jury comprises esteemed professionals in the field of classical guitar. The panel is proposed by the organizing committee and approved by the local governing body of Benicàssim.

While the competition allows a diverse range of classical guitar repertoire, there is a special emphasis on works by Francisco Tárrega. A dedicated prize is awarded for the best interpretation of his compositions. In the final round of the Francisco Tárrega International Guitar Competition, participants were required to perform one of Joaquín Rodrigo’s guitar concertos, such as Concierto de Aranjuez, Concierto para una fiesta or Fantasía para un gentilhombre.

== Selected winners ==
Notable past winners include:

- 1968 - Ricardo Iznaola (Cuba/Venezuela/USA)
- 1969 - Wolfgang Lendle (West Germany)
- 1971 - Ricardo Iznaola (Cuba/Venezuela/USA)
- 1977 - David Russell (UK)
- 1986 - Raphaëlla Smits (Belgium)
- 1998 - Ana Vidović (Croatia)
- 1999 - Marco Tamayo (Cuba/Austria)
- 2002 - Anabel Montesinos (Spain)
- 2009 - Adriano Del Sal (Italy)
- 2013 - Anton Baranov (Russia)
- 2018 - Alí Arango (Cuba)
- 2021 - Marko Topchii (Ukraine)
- 2022 - without first place
- 2023 - Deion Cho (South Korea)
- 2024 - without first place
- 2025 - Álvaro Toscano (Spain)

== Awards ==
The competition has won several awards such as the Gold Oscar for Best Musical Promotion Work and the 2019 Insigne de la Música Valenciana.
