= Jim Redgate =

Australian classical guitar luthier

Jim Redgate is an Australian classical guitar luthier, who owns Redgate Guitars. As of 2012, he makes four models, the lattice-braced, the double-top, and the new wave double-top and traditional fan-braced. His customers include Pepe Romero, Ana Vidović, Ralph Towner, Slava Grigoryan, Leonard Grigoryan, Bertrand Thomas, Jeff Young, Gareth Koch, Odair Assad, Wolfgang Muthspiel, Karin Schaupp, Emmanuel Rossfelder, Hucky Eichelman, and Phillipe Mariotti. One author said of him, "Like fellow Australian Greg Smallman, Redgate builds his (lattice-braced) guitars with an arched back to improve their volume and projection, and he uses lightweight carbon fiber reinforcements under the soundboard. While not as thin as a Smallman's, Redgate's soundboards are much lighter than traditionally braced examples, and his guitars are therefore more responsive, energy efficient, and louder than traditional classical instruments."
