= Krynica-Zdrój =

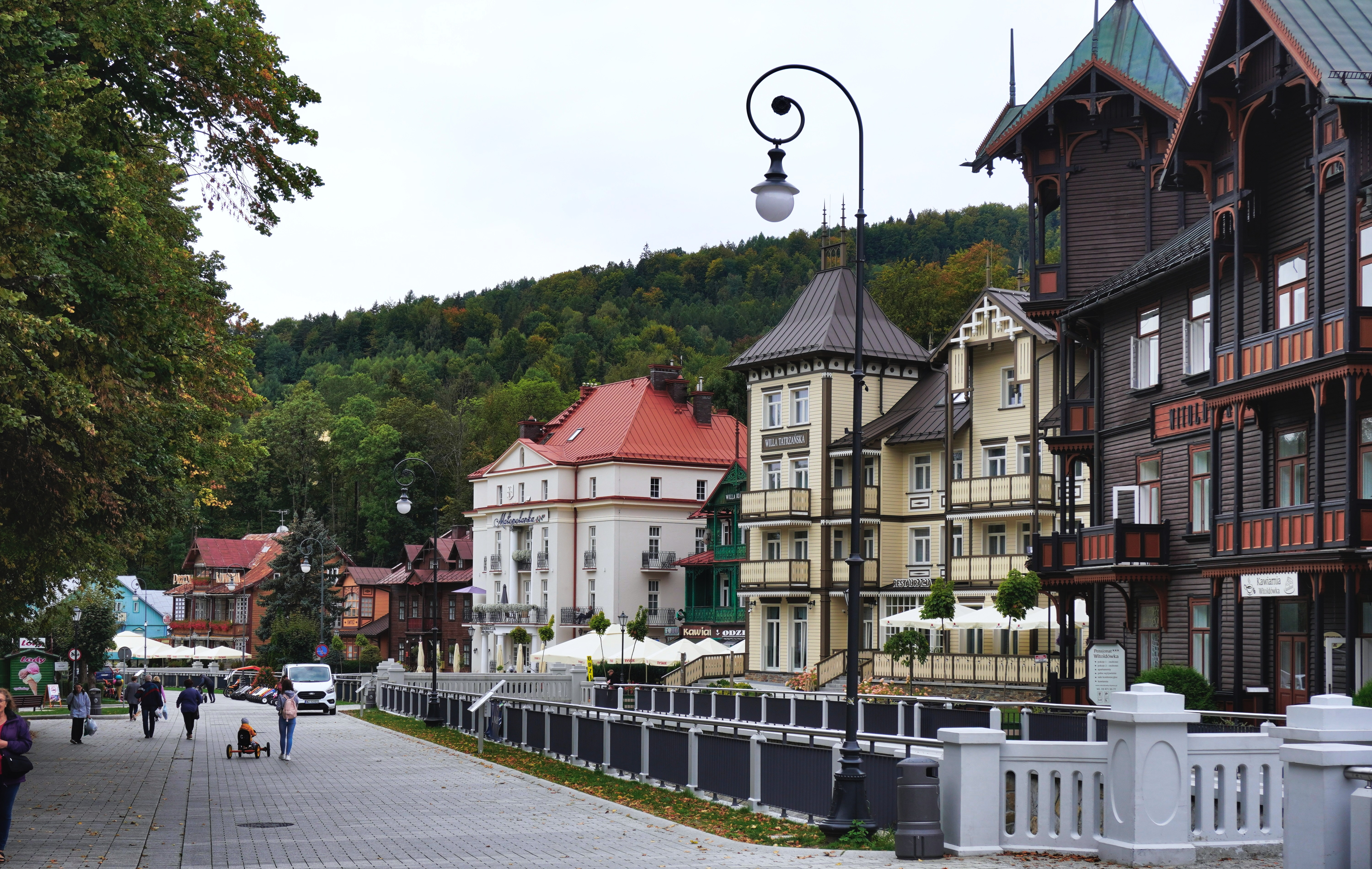
- Health resort (kurort)

- Flag Coat of arms Logo

- Location within Poland
- Coordinates: 49°24′42″N 20°57′18″E
- Country: Poland
- Voivodeship: Lesser Poland
- County: Nowy Sącz
- Gmina: Krynica-Zdrój

Government
  - Mayor: Piotr Ryba (PiS)

Area
  - Total: 40.17 km^{2} (15.51 sq mi)
- Elevation: 590 m (1,940 ft)

Population (2024)
  - Total: 9,504
  - Density: 236.6/km^{2} (612.8/sq mi)
- Postal code: 33-380
- Website: http://www.krynica-zdroj.pl

Krynica-Zdrój [krɨˈɲit͡sa ˈzdrui̯] (until 31 December 2001 Krynica) (Note: Lemko Rusyn: Крениця, Yiddish: קרעניץ) is a town in Nowy Sącz County, Lesser Poland Voivodeship, southern Poland. It is inhabited by over eleven thousand people. It is the biggest spa town in Poland often called the Pearl of Polish Spas; and a popular tourist and winter sports destination situated in the heart of the Beskids mountain range.

== History and economy ==
Krynica was first recorded in official documents in 1547 and was granted town rights in 1889. In the 17th century, mineral waters were discovered in the area. In 1856, the town began rapidly developing into a health resort largely thanks to the activities of Józef Dietl, a Jagiellonian University professor considered the "father of Polish balneology".

By the end of the 19th century, the town had acquired a considerable reputation for its picturesque location and its health resort facilities. It was frequented by Polish elites and intellectuals. Among notable visitors were Jan Matejko, Artur Grottger, Henryk Sienkiewicz and Józef Ignacy Kraszewski. In the interbellum period the town attracted such individuals as Ludwik Solski, Helena Modjeska, Władysław Reymont, Julian Tuwim, K.I. Gałczyński and Jan Kiepura.

Krynica's development was also boosted by the construction of a railway line to Muszyna in 1876, which was further expanded to Krynica-Zdrój in 1911. After World War I, many of the town's buildings were renovated and new spa facilities were built including Nowe Łazienki Mineralne, the Lwigród Guesthouse, and the New Spa House. A popular funicular railway was also constructed to Mount Parkowa.

Due to its convenient location, infrastructure and rail connections with major cities in Europe, Krynica-Zdrój (Zdrój means mineral spring in Polish) was the location of winter sports tournaments during the interwar period, including the 1931 World Ice Hockey Championships and the 1935 FIL European Luge Championships. In the post-war period, the town has hosted the 1958 and 1962 FIL World Luge Championships, the 2004 Euro Ice Hockey Challenge, and the 2018 and 2020 Winter World Polonia Games.

A gondola lift built in 1997 on Mount Jaworzyna Krynicka overlooking Krynica, and subsequent investment in modern skiing facilities (apart from the former track of bobsleigh) made Krynica one of the most important ski resorts in Poland. Nearby Beskid Sądecki mountains are also a perfect setting for recreational cross-country skiing in winter and hiking as well as mountain-biking in summer.

The winter sport of bandy returned to Poland in the 2010s, after many decades. When the country made their first international appearance in 2006 at the World Championships for boys U15 in Edsbyn, Krynica-Zdrój contributed with most players.

== Geography ==
Krynica-Zdrój is located in Southern Lesser Poland in Beskid Sądecki, within the Poprad Landscape Park protected area. The city center lies in the valley of Kryniczanka river and is connected with the nearby Mount Parkowa and Mount Jaworzyna Krynicka by cable railways.

== Notable landmarks ==
- Pump-room Słotwinka in Park Slotwinski - built in 1815 (open only in summer)
- Koncertowa pavilion in Park Słotwiński - built in 1870 (today with a restaurant inside)
- Old Baths (Stare Łazienki) - built in 1866 by Feliks Księżarski
- Old Spa House (Stary Dom Zdrojowy) built 1880-1889 by Jan Zawiejski in Renaissance Revival style
- New Spa House (Nowy Dom Zdrojowy) built 1938-1939 by Witold Minkiewicz in Modernist style
- Main Pump Room (Pijalnia Główna) built 1969-1971 by Zbigniew Mikołajewski and Stanisław Spyt in International Style
- 19th-century Lemko Greek Catholic Tserkva of Guardianship of the Blessed Virgin Mary (1875–1879)
- Church of the Assumption - built 1887-1892 by Jan Zawiejski in Renaissance Revival style
- Historical 19th-century villas including The Góral Villa, The Biała Róża Villa, The Janina Villa and The Biały Orzeł Villa
- Modernist Patria Hotel designed by Bohdan Pniewski and built in 1932
- Viewing tower built on top of the Słotwina Arena ski resort in 2019

== Culture ==
Since 1967, Krynica-Zdrój has held the annual Jan Kiepura Festival, an event initiated by Stefan Półchłopek, former mayor of Krynica, who served as the festival's director during its first 15 editions. It includes the performances of opera, operatta, balet, theatre and classical music. The festival has featured such prominent artists as Martha Eggerth, Wiesław Ochman, Andrzej Hiolski, Pola Lipińska, and Delfina Ambroziak. In 1984, Bogusław Kaczyński was appointed as the festival's artistic director.

The town also hosts the International Czesław Droździewicz Guitar Competition. Krynica was home to Nikifor (birth name Epifaniusz Drowniak), a famous outsider artist in communist Poland.

== Gallery ==
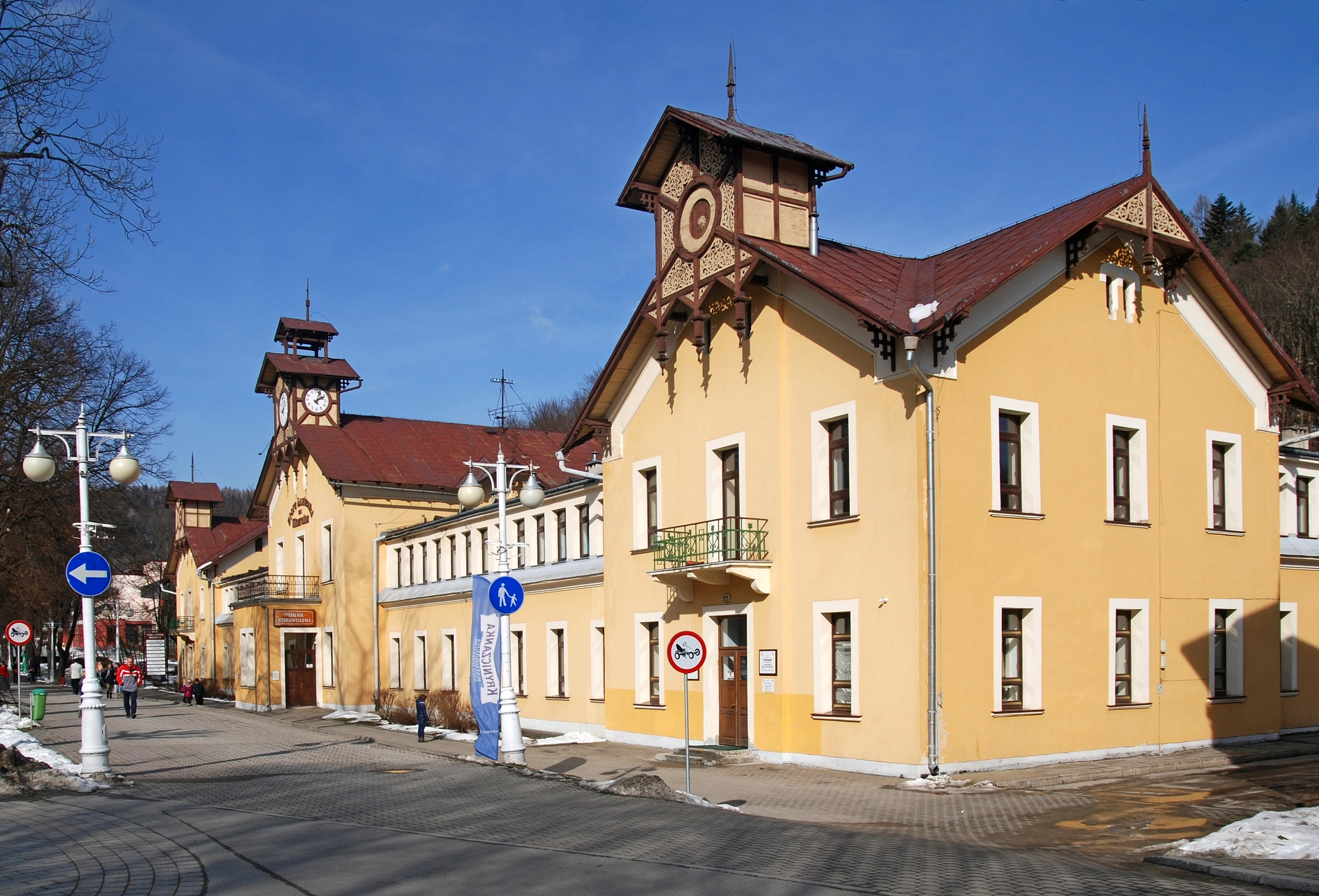
Old Baths (Stare Łazienki)

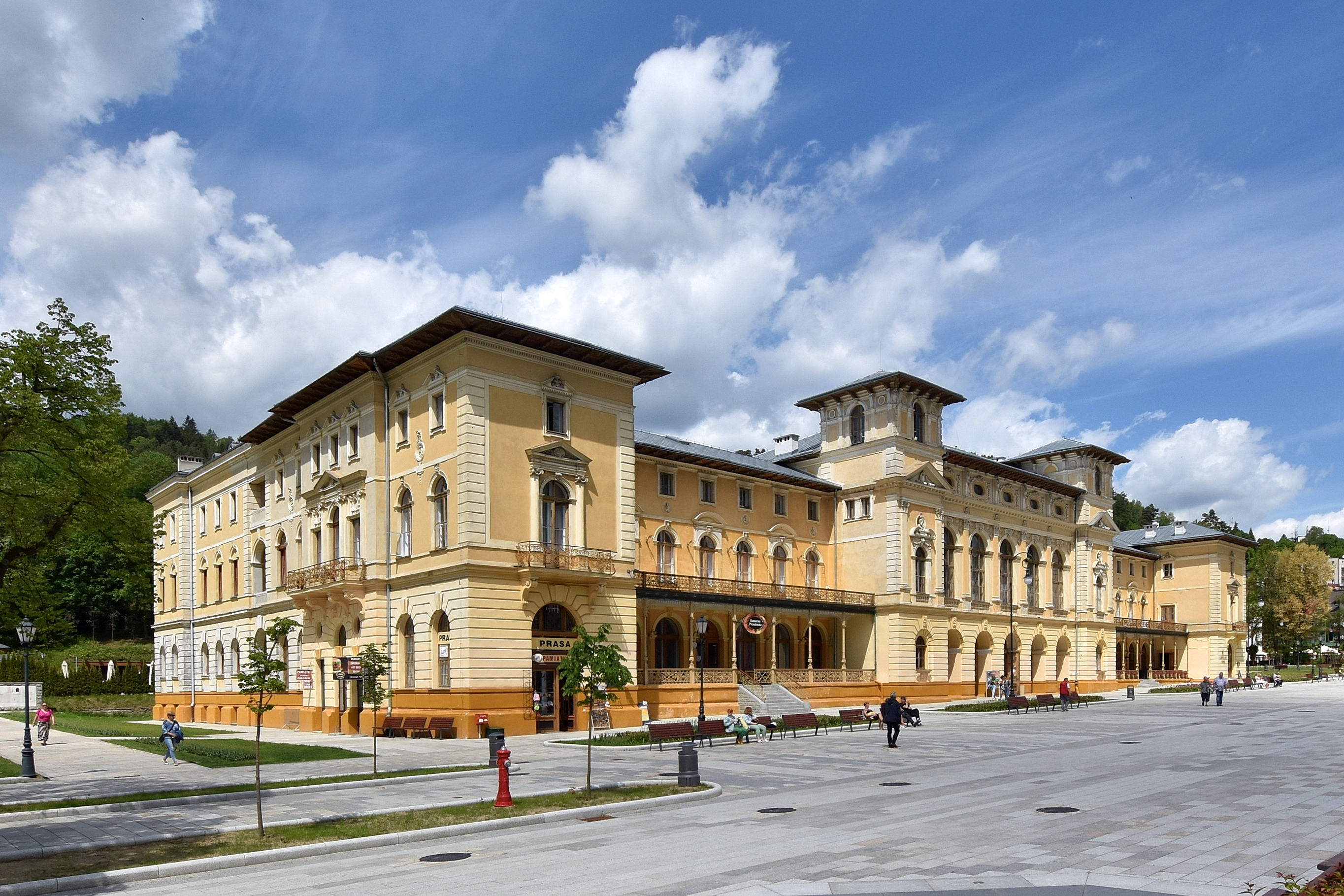
Old Spa House (Stary Dom Zdrojowy)

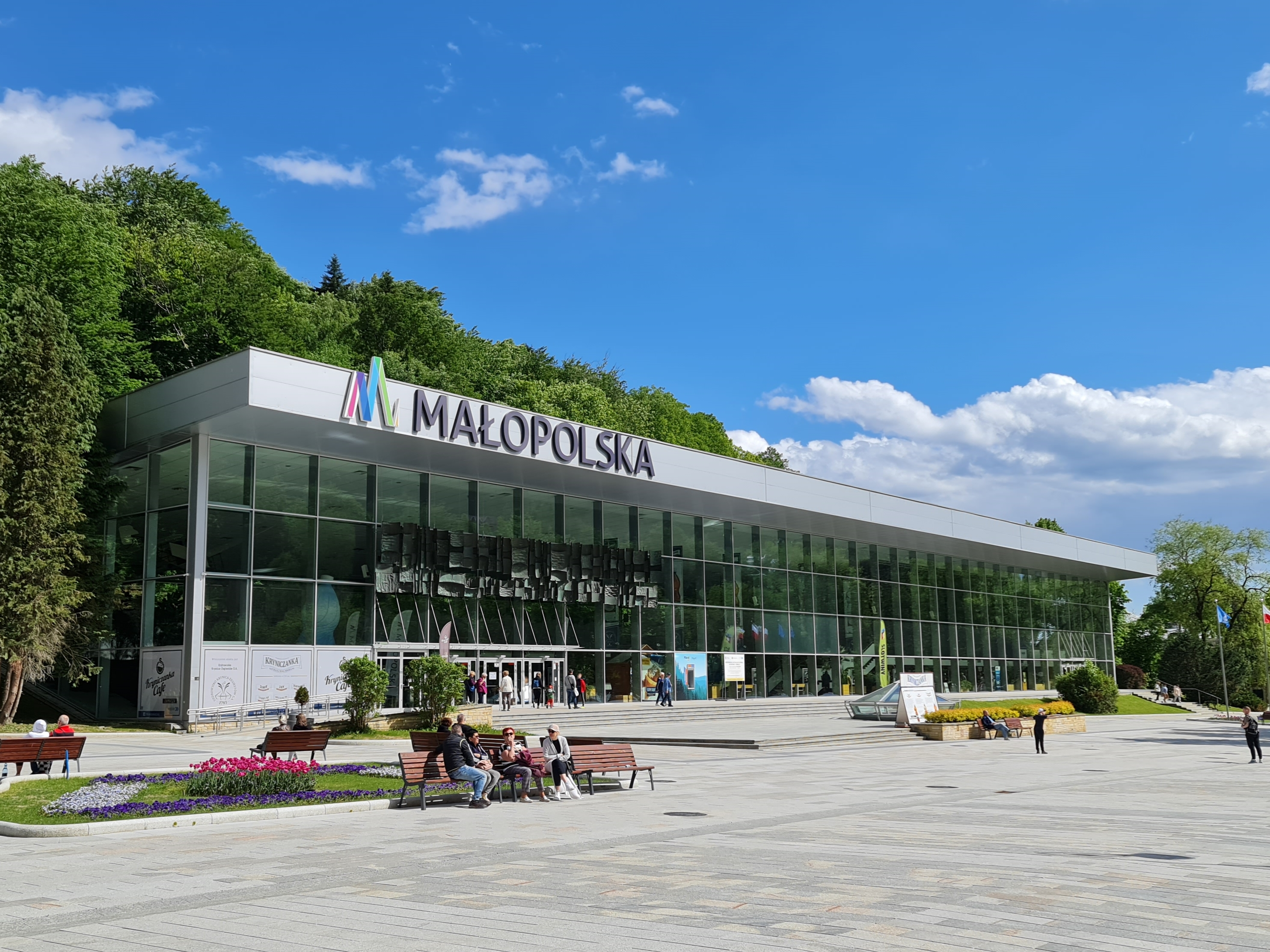
Main Pump Room (Pijalnia Główna)

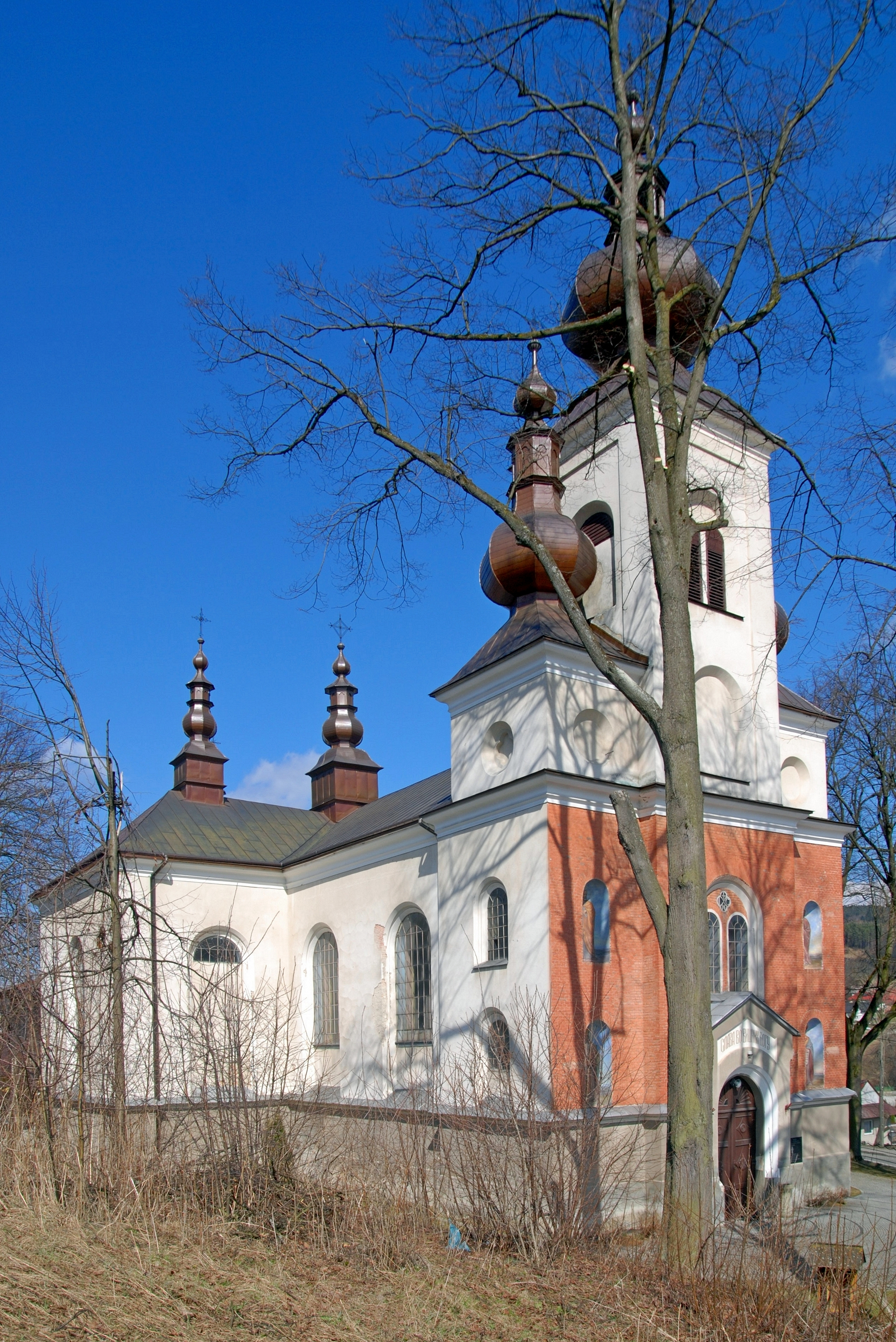
Tserkva of Guardianship of the Blessed Virgin Mary

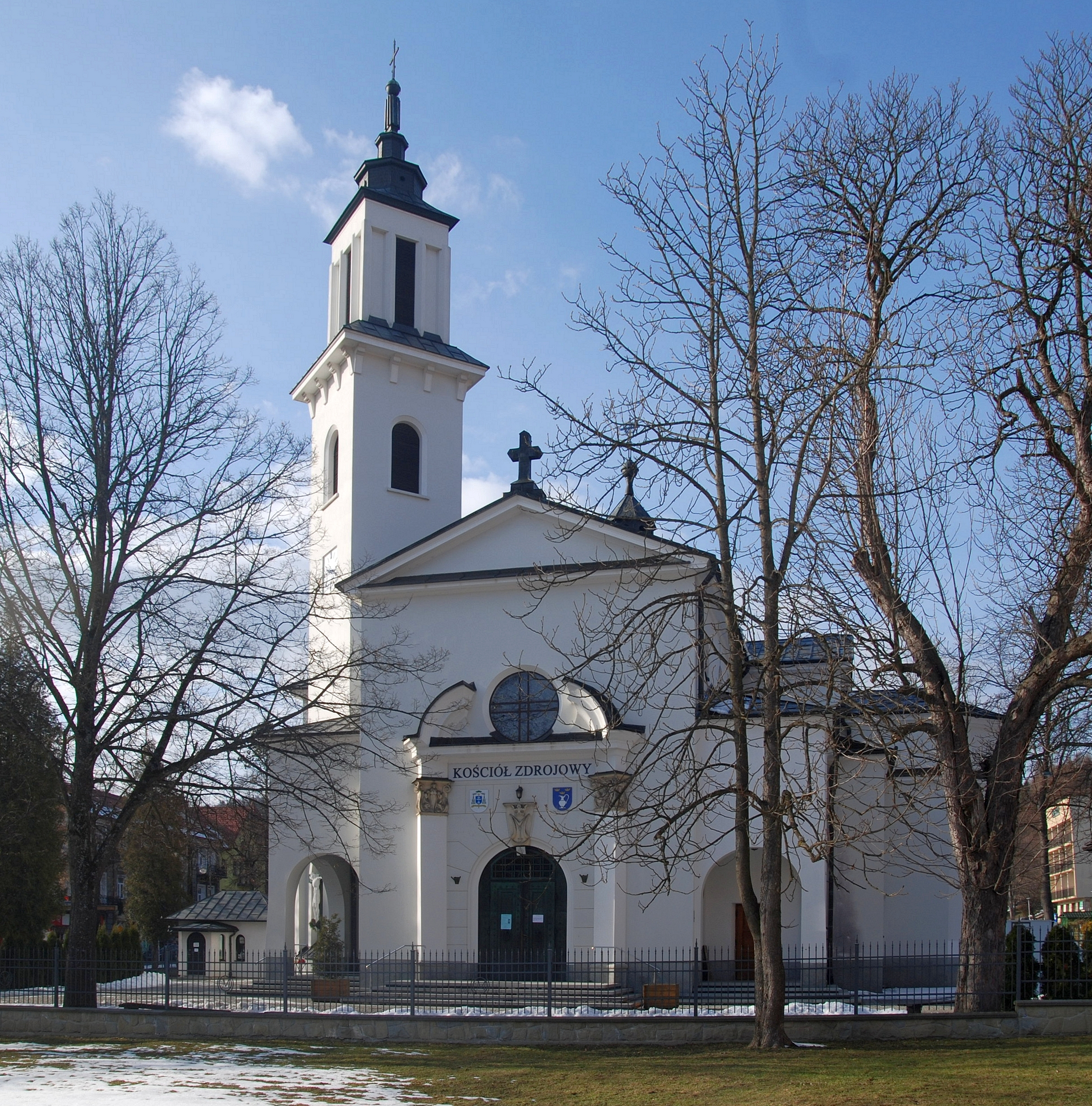
Church of the Assumption

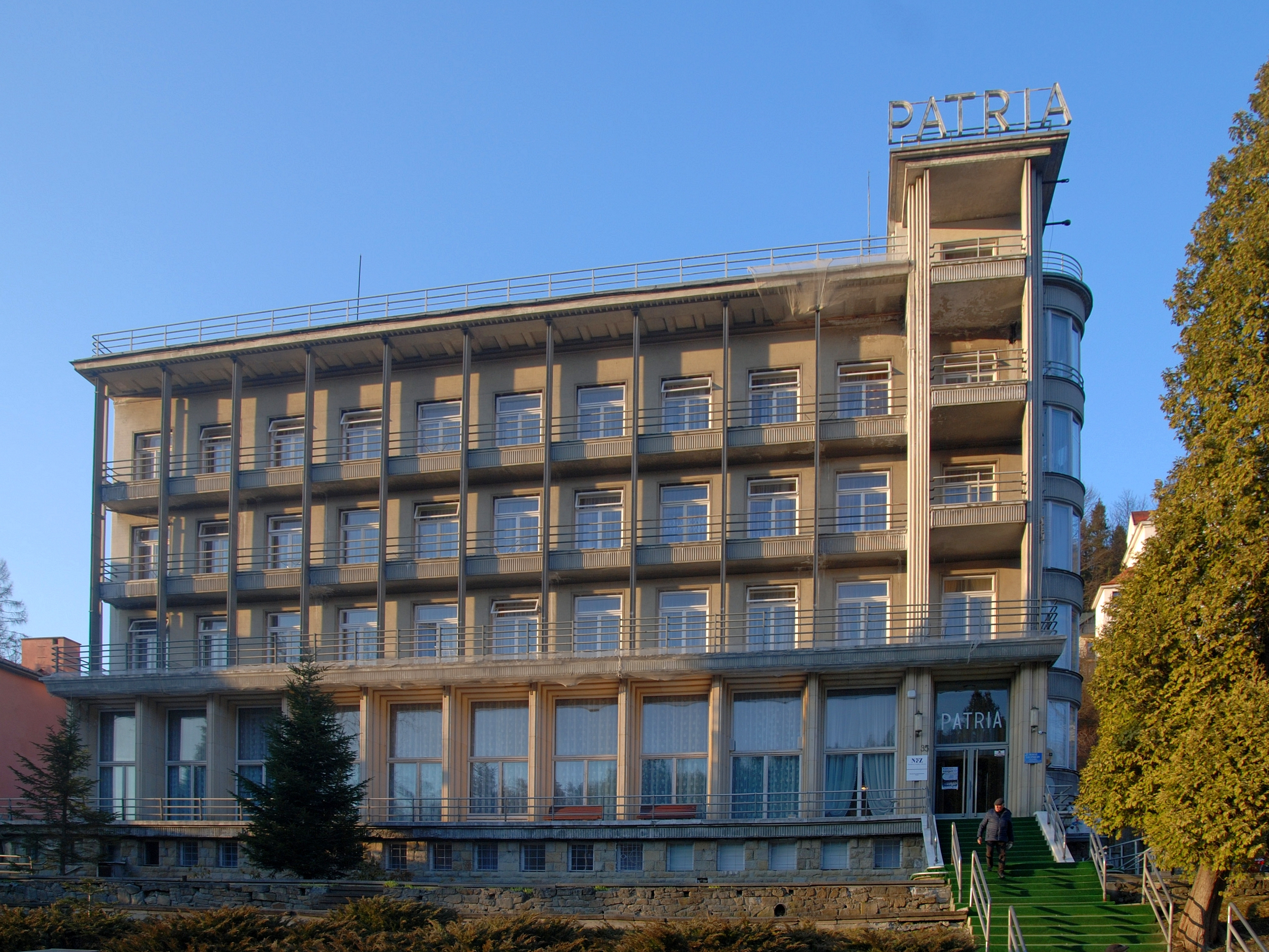
Patria Hotel

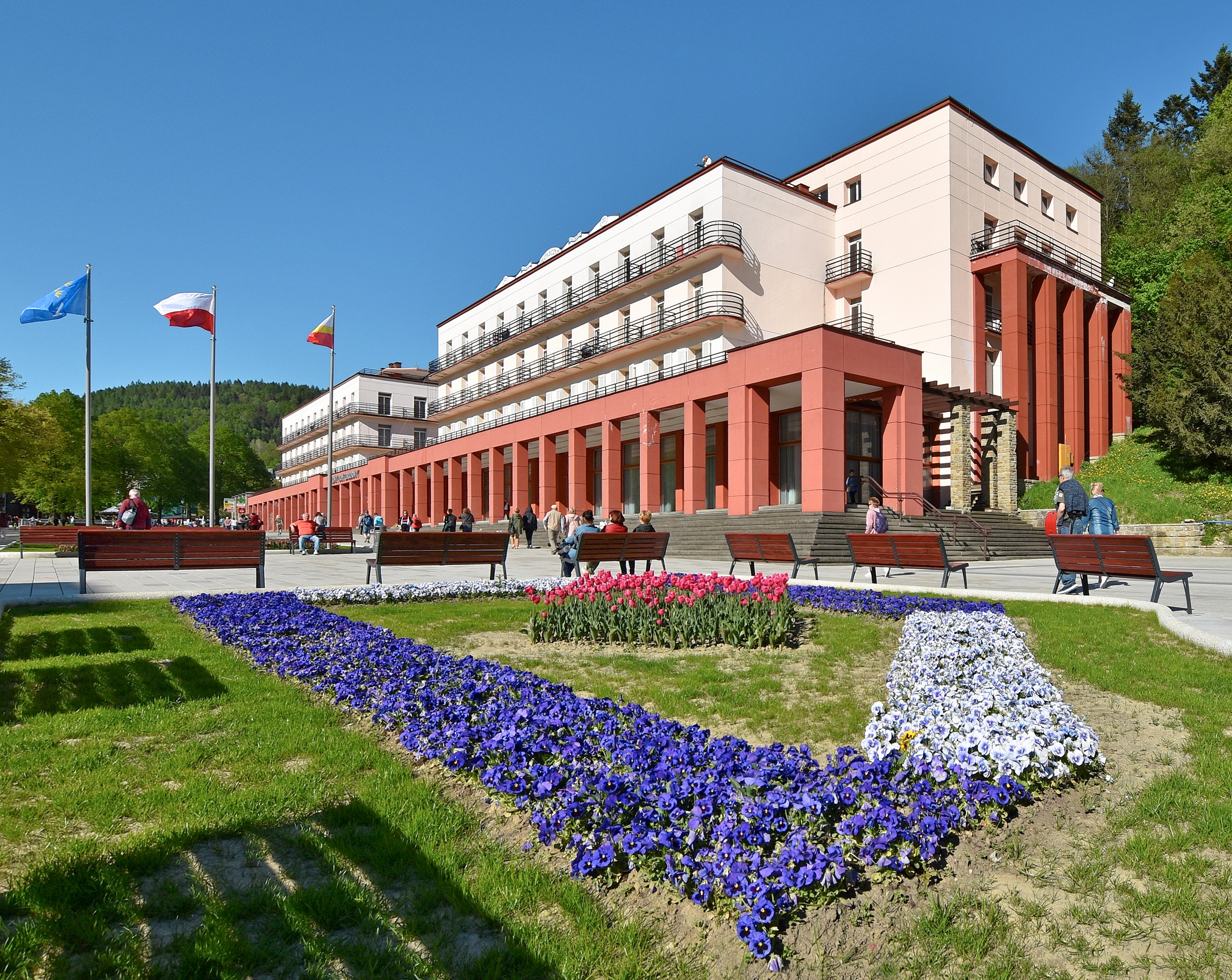
New Spa House (Nowy Dom Zdrojowy)

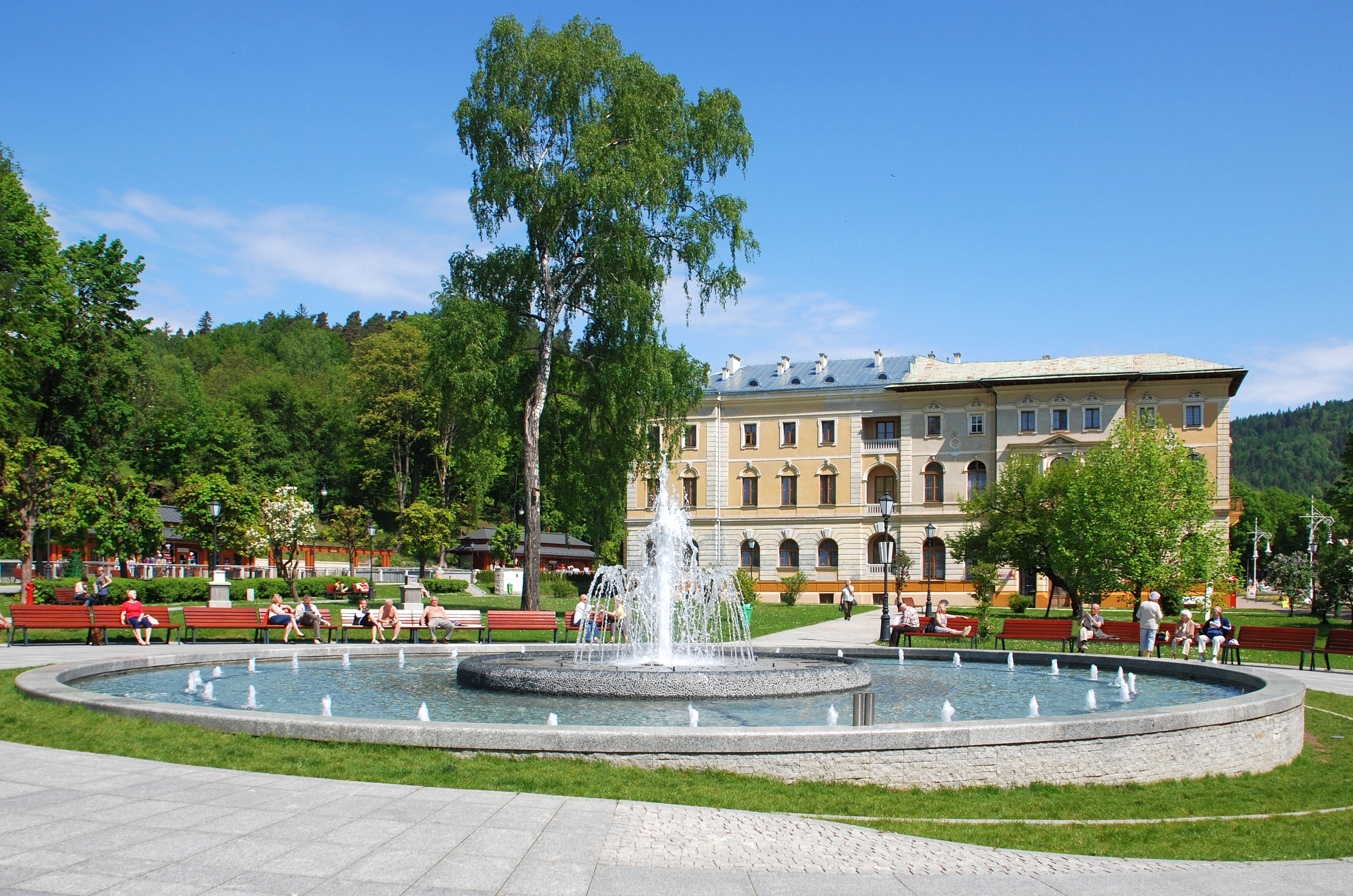
Musical Fountain

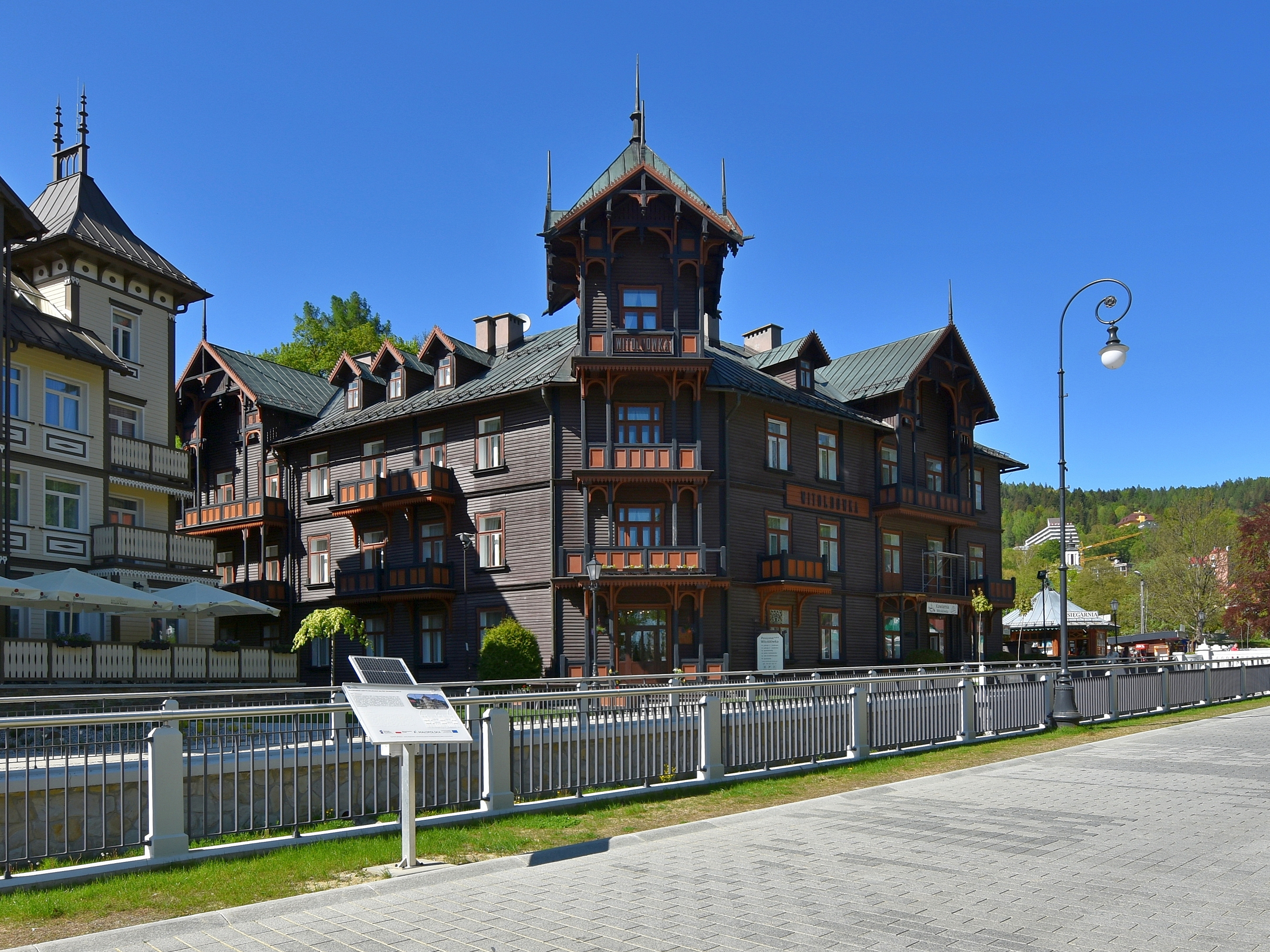
Witoldówka Villa

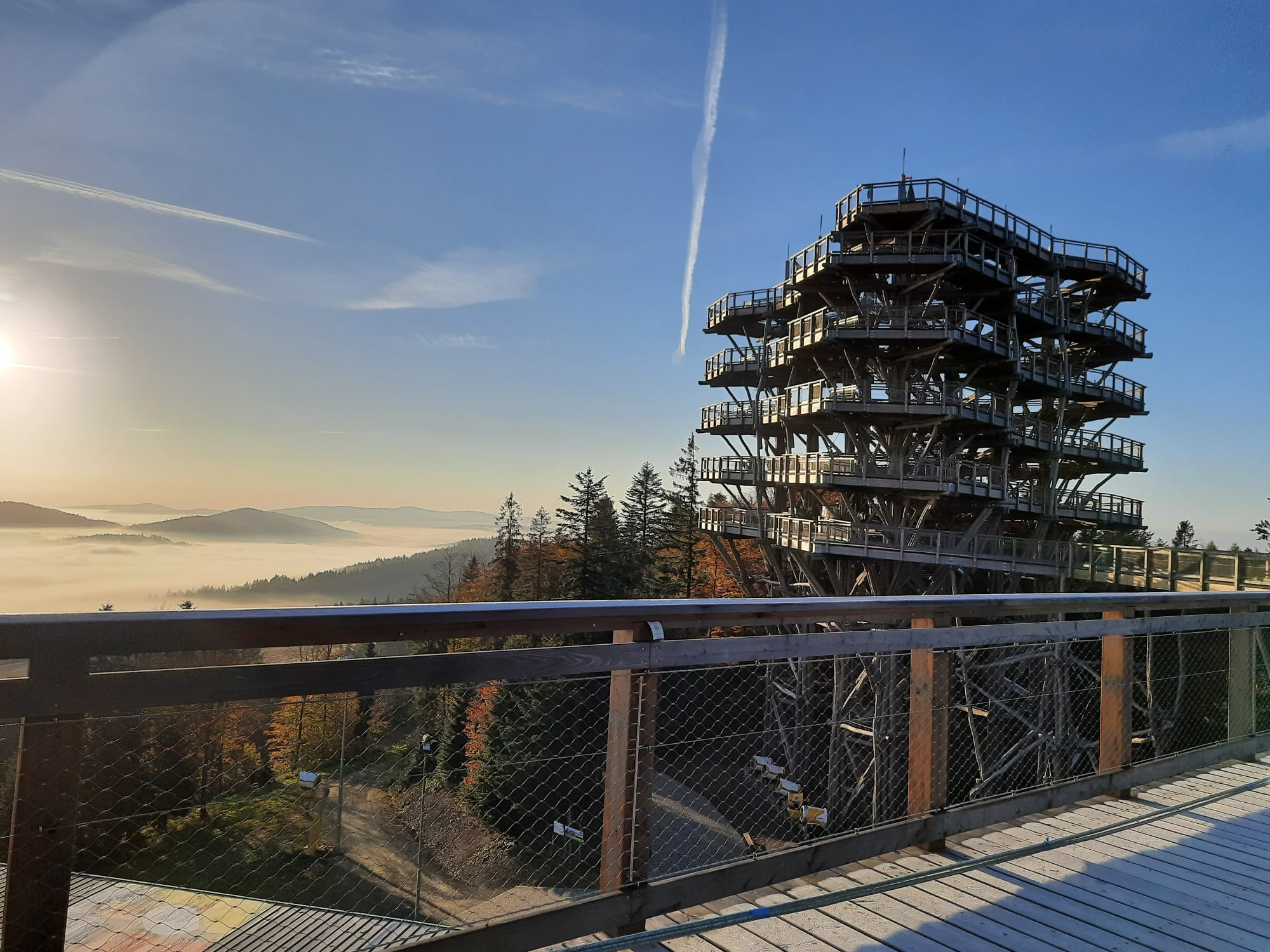
Viewing tower

== International relations ==
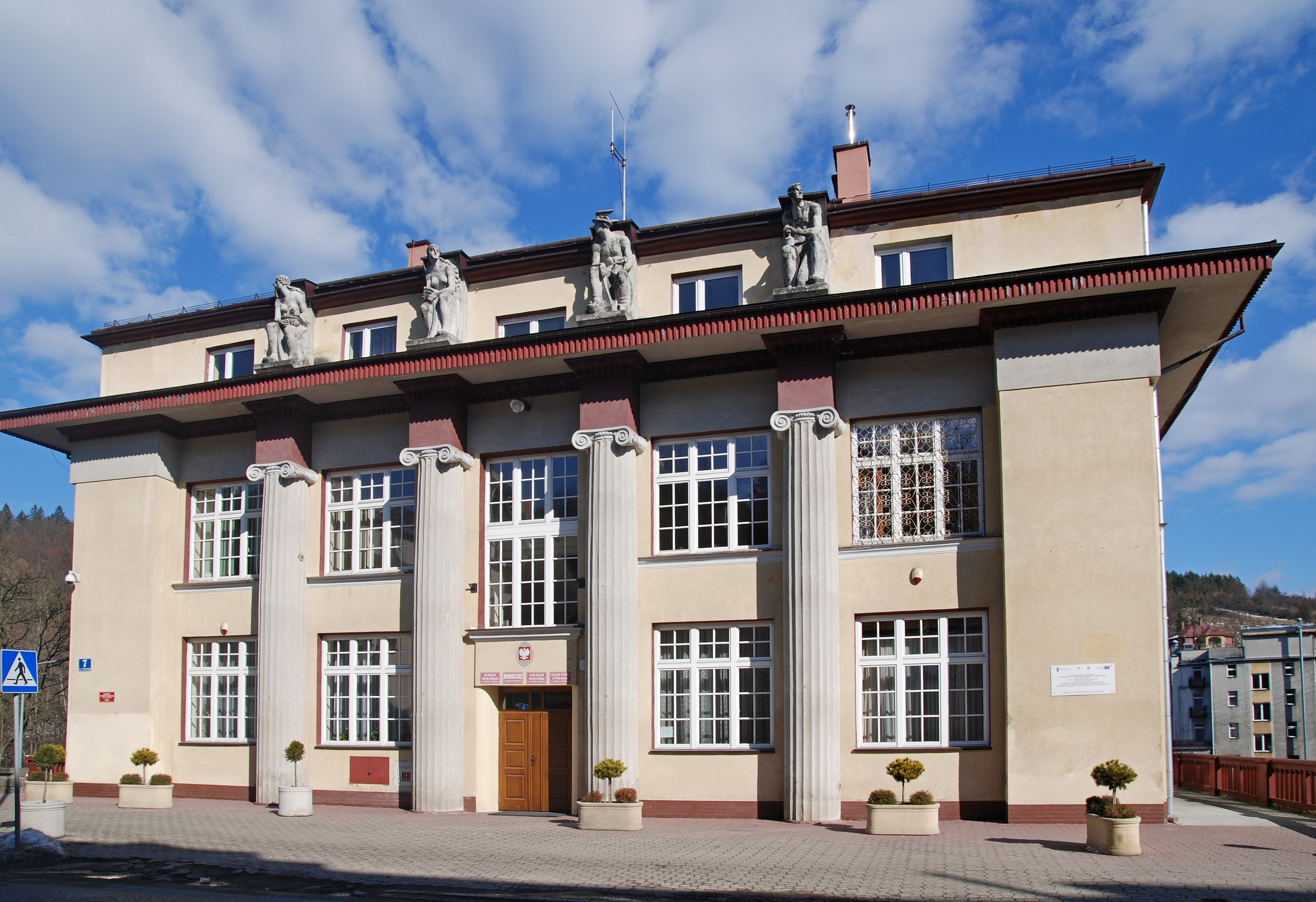
Town hall

Krynica was sometimes nicknamed "Eastern Davos" for the Economic Forum held there each year in September since 1992 until the forum was transferred to the Lower Silesian town of Karpacz in 2019. Politicians (including heads of state) and businessmen from several countries of Central Europe, Russia, Central Asia and the Middle East met there to discuss economic and political matters. Also, part of the inhabitants of Krynica belong to the Lemko minority who speak an Eastern Slavic language called Rusyn.

=== Twin towns — Sister cities ===
Krynica-Zdrój is twinned with:

- Amersham, England, United Kingdom
- Bad Sooden-Allendorf, Hesse, Germany
- Bardejov, Slovakia
- Khmilnyk, Ukraine

== Notable people ==
- Henryk Szost (born 1982), long-distance runner
- Jakub Czerwiński (born 1991), footballer
- Katarzyna Kawa (born 1992), tennis player
- Jan Kiepura (1902–1966), singer and actor
- Joanna Kulig (born 1982), actress
- Nikifor Krynicki (1895–1968), naïve painter
- Agnieszka Skalniak-Sójka (born 1997), racing cyclist
- Andrzej Zabawa (born 1955), ice hockey player

== See also ==
- List of spa towns
- Kudowa-Zdrój
- Szczawnica
