= Mauro Giuliani =

Italian composer (1781–1829)

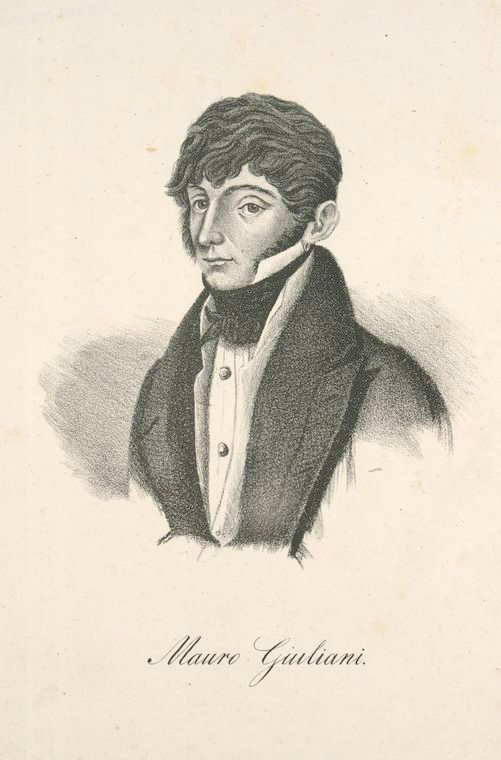
- Born: Mauro Giuseppe Sergio Pantaleo Giuliani; 27 July 1781; Bisceglie, Kingdom of Naples
- Died: 8 May 1829 (aged 47); Naples, Kingdom of the Two Sicilies
- Occupations: guitarist, cellist, singer, and composer

Mauro Giuseppe Sergio Pantaleo Giuliani (27 July 1781 – 8 May 1829) was an Italian guitarist, cellist, singer, and composer. He was a leading guitar virtuoso of the early 19th century. One of his best known works is his Grand Overture, which has become standard early Romantic classical guitar repertoire.

== Biography ==
Although born in Bisceglie, Giuliani's centre of study was in Barletta, where he moved with his brother Nicola in the first years of his life. His first instrumental training was on the cello—an instrument which he never completely abandoned—and he may have also studied the violin. Subsequently, he devoted himself to the guitar, becoming a skilled performer on it in a short time. The names of his teachers are unknown.

He married Maria Giuseppe del Monaco, and they had a child, Michael, born in Barletta in 1801. After that, he was possibly in Bologna and Trieste for a brief stay. By the summer of 1806, fresh from his studies of counterpoint, cello and guitar in Italy, he had moved to Vienna without his family. There, he began a relationship with the Viennese Anna Wiesenberger (1784–1817), with whom he had four daughters, Maria Willmuth (born 1808), Aloisia Willmuth (born 1810), Emilia Giuliani-Guglielmi (born 1813) and Karolina Giuliani (born 1817).

In Vienna, he became acquainted with the classical instrumental style. In 1807, Giuliani began to publish his own compositions. His concert tours took him all over Europe, and he was acclaimed for his virtuosity and musical taste. He achieved significant success and became a musical celebrity, equal to the best of the many instrumentalists and composers who were active in the Austrian capital city at the beginning of the 19th century.

Giuliani defined a new role for the guitar in the context of European music. He was acquainted with the highest figures of Austrian society and with notable composers such as Rossini and Beethoven, and cooperated with the best active concert musicians in Vienna. In 1815, he appeared with Johann Nepomuk Hummel (followed later by Ignaz Moscheles), the violinist Joseph Mayseder and the cellist Joseph Merk, in a series of chamber concerts in the botanical gardens of Schönbrunn Palace, concerts that were called the "Dukaten Concerte", after the price of the ticket, which was a ducat. This exposure gave Giuliani prominence in the musical environment of the city. Also in 1815, he was the official concert artist for the celebrations of the Congress of Vienna. Two years earlier, on 8 December 1813, he had played (probably cello) in an orchestra for the first performance of Beethoven's Seventh Symphony.

In Vienna, Giuliani had minor success as a composer. He worked mostly with the publisher Artaria, who published many of his works for guitar, but had dealings with other local publishers who spread his compositions across Europe. He developed a teaching career here as well; among his numerous students were Jan Nepomucen Bobrowicz and Felix Horetzky.

In 1819, Giuliani left Vienna, mainly for financial reasons: he expected to make a financial profit on a concert tour through Bohemia and Bavaria. He returned to Italy, spending time in Trieste and Venice, and finally settled in Rome. In 1822, he brought his illegitimate daughter Emilia to Italy, who had been born in Vienna in 1813. She was educated at the nunnery L'adorazione del Gesù from 1821 to 1826, together with Giuliani's first illegitimate daughter, Maria Willmuth. In Rome, he had little success, publishing only a few compositions and giving only one concert.

In July 1823, he began a series of trips to Naples to be with his father, who was seriously ill. In the Bourbon city of Naples, Giuliani would find a better reception to his guitar artistry and was able to publish other works for guitar with local publishers.

In 1826, he performed in Portici before Francesco I and the Bourbon court. During this Neapolitan period, he appeared frequently in duo concerts with his daughter Emilia, who had become a skilled performer on the guitar. Toward the end of 1827, his health began to fail, and he died in Naples on 8 May 1829.

=== Quotes ===
Giuliani's expression and tone in guitar playing were astonishing, and a competent critic said of him: "He vocalized his adagios to a degree impossible to be imagined by those who never heard him; his melody in slow movements was no longer like the short, unavoidable staccato of the piano, requiring profusion of harmony to cover the deficient sustension of notes, but it was invested with a character, not only sustained and penetrating, but of so earnest and pathetic a description as to make it appear the natural characteristic of the instrument. In a word, he made the instrument sing."

— Philip James Bone, The guitar and mandolin, 1914 (page 127)

== Works ==
=== Theme and variations ===
As a guitar composer, he was very fond of the theme and variations— an extremely popular form in Vienna. He had a remarkable ability to weave a melody into a passage with musical effect while remaining true to the idiom of the instrument.

- One example of this ability is to be found in his Variations on a theme of Handel, Op. 107. This popular theme, known as "The Harmonious Blacksmith", appears in the Aria from Handel's Suite no. 5 in E for harpsichord.
- Another example is Giuliani's Sei variazioni sull'aria "A Schisserl und a Reindl", op. 38, which is a set of variations on the Austrian folk song A Schisserl und a Reindl, is åll mein Kuchlg'schirr, used in the play Der Kaufmannsbude (1796), with music by Johann Baptist Henneberg (1768–1822) and text by Schikaneder; and in the play Der Marktschreyer (1799), with music by Franz Xaver Süssmayr (1766–1803) and text by Friedrich Karl Lippert. (Beethoven used the same theme in his work op.105, number 3 for flute and piano.)
- His three-movement sonata Op. 15 is a clever, witty work and one of the most developed examples of the genre for guitar.
- Several sets of extended Rossiniana reside at the pinnacle of nineteenth-century operatic potpourri for guitar.

Giuliani's achievements as a composer were numerous. Giuliani's 150 compositions for guitar with opus numbers constitute the nucleus of the nineteenth-century guitar repertoire. He composed extremely challenging pieces for solo guitar as well as works for orchestra and Guitar-Violin and Guitar-Flute duos.

Significant pieces by Giuliani include his three guitar concertos (op. 30, 36 and 70); a series of six fantasias for guitar solo, op. 119–124, based on airs from Rossini operas and entitled the "Rossiniane"; several sonatas for violin and guitar and flute and guitar; a quintet, op. 65, for strings and guitar; some collections for voice and guitar, and a Grand Overture written in the Italian style. He also transcribed many symphonic works, both for solo guitar and guitar duo. One such transcription arranges the overture to The Barber of Seville by Rossini, for two guitars. There are further numerous didactic works, among which is a method for guitar that is used by modern teachers.

Today, Giuliani's concertos and solo pieces are widely performed by professionals.

=== Original sources of themes ===
Giuliani arranged many 19th-century opera themes for the guitar, e.g. from the opera Semiramide by Gioachino Rossini. His work Le Rossiniane also includes numerous themes from the operas of Rossini.

==== Themes in Giuliani's Le Rossiniane ====
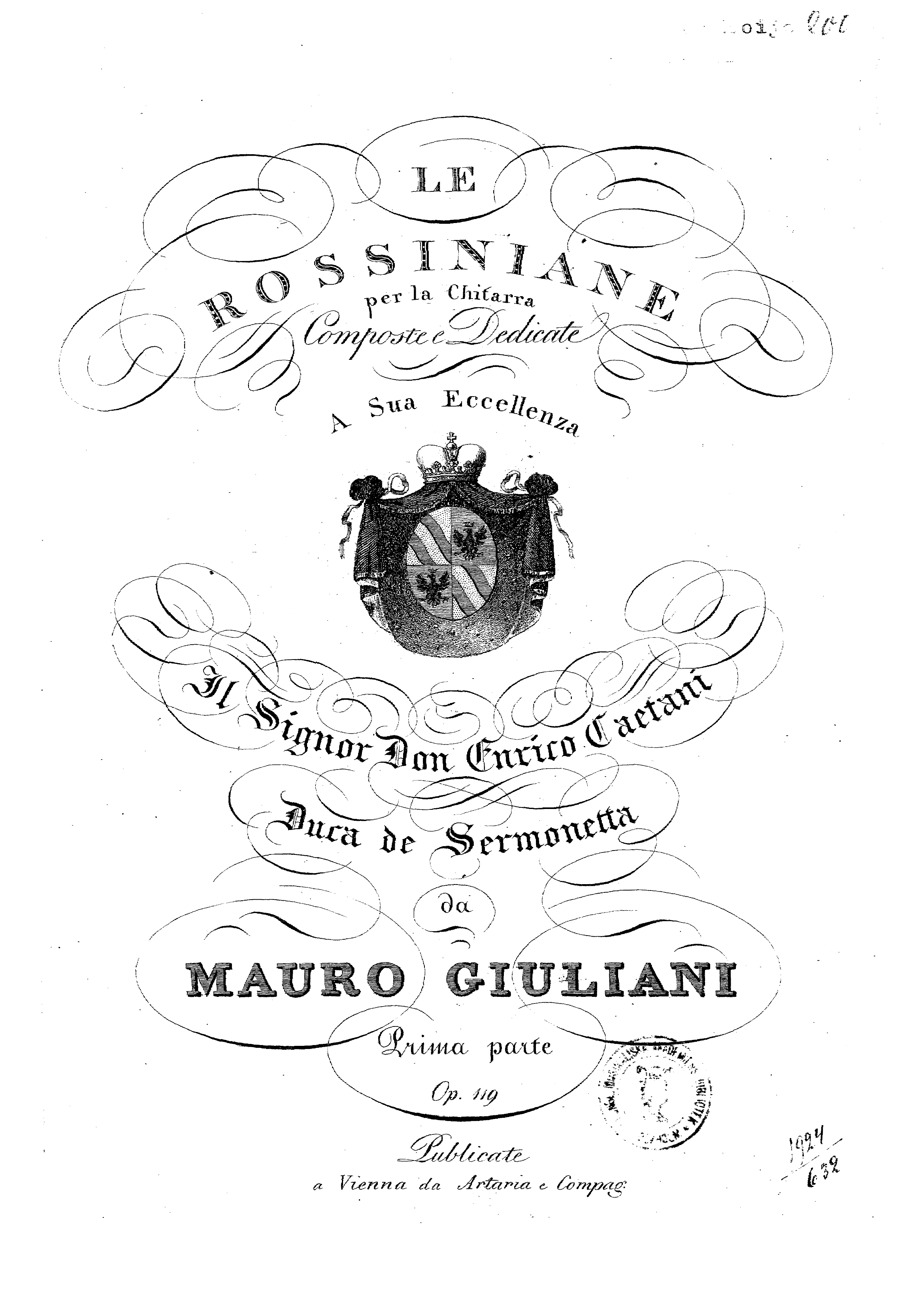
Original Cover of Part 1 of Giuliani's Le Rossiniane

- Rossiniana I, op. 119

Introduction (Andantino)
"Assisa a piè d'un salice" (Otello)
"Languir per una bella", Andante grazioso (L'Italienne à Alger)
"Con gran piacer, ben mio", Maestoso (L'Italienne à Alger)
"Caro, caro ti parlo in petto", Moderato (L'Italienne à Alger)
"Cara, per te quest'anima", Allegro Vivace (Armida)

- Rossiniana II, op. 120

Introduction (Sostenuto)
"Deh ! Calma, o ciel", Andantino sostenuto (Otello)
"Arditi all'ire", Allegretto innocente (Armida)
"Non più mesta accanto al fuoco", Maestoso (Cendrillon)
"Di piacer mi balza il cor", (La pie voleuse)
"Fertilissima Regina", Allegretto (Cendrillon)

- Rossiniana III, op. 121

Introduction (Maestoso Sostenuto)
"Un soave non-so che" (Cendrillon)
"Oh mattutini albori!", Andantino (La dame du lac)
"Questo vecchio maledetto", (Le Turc en Italie)
"Sorte! Secondami", Allegro (Zelmira)
"Cinto di nuovi allori", Maestoso (Ricciardo et Zoraïde)

- Rossiniana IV, op. 122

Introduction (Sostenuto-Allegro Maestoso)
"Forse un dì conoscerete", Andante (La pie voleuse)
"Mi cadono le lagrime" (La pie voleuse)
"Ah se puoi così lasciarmi", Allegro Maestoso (Moïse en Egypte)
"Piacer egual gli dei", Maestoso (Mathilde de Shabran)
"Voglio ascoltar" (La pierre de touche)

- Rossiniana V, op. 123

Introduction (Allegro con brio)
"E tu quando tornerai", Andantino mosso (Tancrède)
"Una voce poco fa" (Le Barbier de Séville)
"Questo è un nodo avviluppato", Andante sostenuto (Cendrillon)
"Là seduto l'amato Giannetto", Allegro (La pie voleuse)
"Zitti zitti, piano piano", Allegro (Le Barbier de Séville)

- Rossiniana VI, op. 124

Introduction (Maestoso)
"Qual mesto gemito", Larghetto (Sémiramis)
"Oh quante lagrime finor versai", Maestoso (La dame du lac)
"Questo nome che suona vittoria", Allegro brillante (Le siège de Corinthe)

The "Introduction" from Rossiniana No. 2 has become well known in popular culture due to its inclusion in the Counter Strike Italy map.

== Pedagogy ==
Giuliani is the only guitarist of the first generation of classical guitar who did not publish a method. However, he left behind a vast collection of studies and exercises that are still used in a guitarist's early training today:

- Op.1- Studio per la chitarra ("Studio" for the guitar)
  - Part One, for the right hand (120 Right Hand Studies)
  - Part Two, for the left hand
  - Part Three, ornaments etc.
  - Part Four, twelve progressive lessons
- Op.48 - Esercizio per la chitarra, contenente 24 pezzi della maggiore difficoltà, diversi preludi, passaggi, ed assolo (Exercise for the guitar, containing 24 pieces of the greatest difficulty, including various preludes, passaggi, and solo pieces)
- Op.51 - XVIII Leçons Progressives (Eighteen Progressive Lessons)
- Op.98 - Studi Dilettevoli ossia Raccolta di vari Pezzi Originali (Delightful Studies, or, Collection of various Original Pieces)
- Op.100 - Etudes instructives, faciles, et agréables… contenant un Recueil de Cadences, Caprices, Rondeaux, et Préludes (Instructive, easy, and agreeable studies… containing a collection of cadences, caprices, rondos, and preludes)
- Op.139 - 24 Prime Lezioni, Parte prima (24 First Lessons, Part 1)
  - Only six studies were ever published in this collection–not 24, and no part 2.

== Instruments used by Giuliani ==
Of the instruments used by Giuliani, there are guitars made by:

- possibly: Gennaro Fabricatore, (Naples 1809) (now in the collection of Gianni Accornero)
  At the bottom of the guitar, one can see the initials M G. The guitarcase also has the initials M G.
- briefly: Pons l'Aîné (Joseph Pons), (Paris 1812)
  This Pons guitar was made for Archduchess Marie Louise of Austria in Paris 1812, and later given to Giuliani: is known to have been in Giuliani's possession only briefly. Giuliani later gave it to the amateur guitarist Christopher Bilderbeck de Monte as a present. However, Giuliani did not often play this 1812 guitar: it hardly shows signs of use.
- unlikely: Pons l'Aîné (Joseph Pons), (Paris 1825) (now in the collection of Gianni Accornero)
  The back cover of a CD claims "Giuliani's original Guitar Pons l'Aîné 1825". Though this is probably a deceptive and possibly intentionally ambiguous claim. Gianni Accornero wrote the CD's liner notes about the guitar, and claims: "This instrument is in actual fact identical to the one which Joseph had made for Empress Marie-Louise of Habsburg, the wife of Napoleon, who later gave it to Giuliani. This instrument became one of his favourites. Not only the model is the same, but also are the different types of wood used for its construction."
  However Paul Pleijsier is critical of these claims; and has found flaws and inconsistencies in Accornero's claims. Pleijsier states that there is no evidence that Giuliani ever played the 1825 Pons.
  Eduardo Catemario (the performer on the CD) notes "E` interessante notare che questa Pons è molto simile (per non-dire identica) a quella di Giuliani" ("It is interesting to note that this Pons is very similar (if not identical) to that of Giuliani").

== Bibliography ==
=== Biographies ===
- Thomas F. Heck: Mauro Giuliani : a life for the guitar (GFA Refereed Monographs, 2) : Published as an e-book (Kindle, ePub) by the Guitar Foundation of America, 2013. ISBN 978-0-9833602-1-6. Updates the author's 1995 monograph on Giuliani, cited below.
- Nicola Giuliani: Mauro Giuliani, Ascesa e declino del virtuoso della chitarra (Guitar virtuoso: his early life and final decline) 2005, ISBN 88-87618-06-2
- Nicola Giuliani: La sesta corda. Vita narrata di Mauro Giuliani, Bari, Levante, 2008 ("La Puglia nei documenti", 12). ISBN 978-88-7949-495-3
- Nicola Giuliani: La sexta cuerda. Vida narrada de Mauro Giuliani (Spanish edition). Editorial Piles, Valencia. ISBN 978-84-15928-62-1
- Thomas F. Heck: Mauro Giuliani : virtuoso guitarist and composer. Columbus : Editions Orphée, 1995. Reprinted in paperback 1997. Sold out in 2005; superseded by Mauro Giuliani : a Life for the Guitar (2013) cited above. (English) ISBN 0-936186-87-9 OCLC 32394767
- Nicola Giuliani: Omaggio a Mauro Giuliani : l'Orfeo della Puglia Type: Italian : Book Book Publisher: [S.l. : s.n.], 1999. OCLC 45035045
- Marco Riboni: Mauro Giuliani (1782–1829) : profilo biografico-critico ed analisi delle trascrizioni per chitarra Type: Italian : Book Book : Thesis/dissertation/manuscript Publisher: Anno accademico 1990–1991. OCLC 32930581
- Marco Riboni: Mauro Giuliani (1781–1829) : profilo biografico-critico ed analisi delle trascrizioni per chitarra Type: English : Book Book Publisher: [S.l. : s.n.], 1992. OCLC 69237592
- Brian Jeffery: Introduction and indexes Type: English : Book Book Publisher: London : Tecla Editions, ©1988. OCLC 24958769
- Filippo E Araniti: Nuove acquisizioni sull'opera e sulla vita di Mauro Giuliani : gli anni del soggiorno napoletano (1824–1829) Type: Italian : Book Book Publisher: Barletta-Trani : Regione Puglia-Assessorato Pubblica Istruzione, 1993. OCLC 42716282
- Thomas F. Heck: "The birth of the classic guitar and its cultivation in Vienna, reflected in the career and compositions of Mauro Giuliani (died 1829)"; Biography in Vol. 1, Thematic catalogue of the complete works of Mauro Giuliani in Vol. 2. Type: English : Doctoral dissertation, Yale University, 1970.
- Brian Jeffery: Introductions and indexes to Mauro Giuliani : Complete Works. Type: English : Book Book.Publisher: Penderyn, South Wales : Tecla Editions, 1988. OCLC 52613698

=== Analysis ===
- Yvonne Regina Chavez: The flute and guitar duos of Mauro Giuliani Book: Thesis/dissertation/manuscript Publisher: 1991. (English) OCLC 24571012
- Roger West Hudson: The orchestration of the guitar concerto : a comparison of the Concerto in A major, op. 30, by Mauro Giuliani and the Concierto del sol by Manuel Ponce. Type: English : Book Book : Thesis/dissertation/manuscript. Publisher: 1992. OCLC 31118635
- Heike Vajen Rossiniana no. 6 op. 124 by Mauro Giuliani.Type: German : Book Book. Publisher: Celle : Moeck, (1986). OCLC 46051295
- Volker Höh: Sonata op. 15 : Fingersatz by Mauro Giuliani. Type: Book Book Publisher: Celle : Moeck, 1989. OCLC 46095695
- Horacio Ceballos: Sonata Op. 15 [Música] by Mauro Giuliani. Type: Spanish : Book Book. Publisher: Buenos Aires, Argentina : RICORDI, 1977. OCLC 70134745
- Kurt L Schuster: Performing Joseph Haydn's Divertimento a quattro, opus 2, no. 2 and Mauro Giuliani's Grand sonata eroica, opus 150. Type: English : Book Book : Thesis/dissertation/manuscript. Publisher: 1989.: OCLC 20402277
