= Ana Vidović =

Croatian classical guitarist

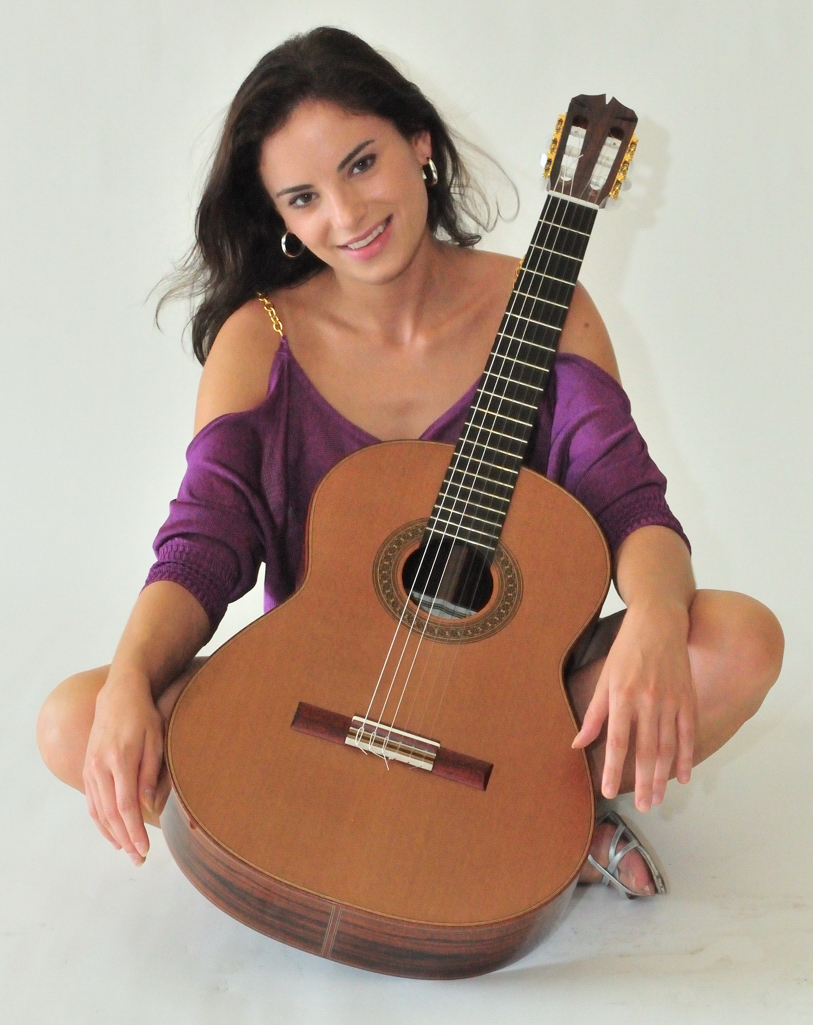
- Vidović in 2009
- Born: 8 November 1980 (age 45); Karlovac, Croatia
- Education: Zagreb Academy of Music; Peabody Institute
- Musical career
- Instrument: Classical guitar
- Years active: 1988–present
- Labels: BGS; Croatia; Naxos
- Website: anavidovic.com

Ana Vidović (born 8 November 1980) is a Croatian classical guitarist. As a guitarist child prodigy, she has won a number of prizes and international competitions all over the world.

== Early life ==
Vidović was born on November 8, 1980, in Karlovac, Croatia. Her father, Ljubomir, played bass guitar and performed with his band nationwide in his youth. She has two older brothers, Viktor, a classical guitarist, and Silvije, a concert pianist. Inspired by her brother Viktor, she started playing guitar at age 5. She attended a music school in her hometown, and began performing at 8. By the age of 11, Vidović was performing internationally and showed such an extraordinary talent that at 13, she became the youngest student to attend the Academy of Music in Zagreb (at the time of the Croatian War of Independence). She studied with Professor István Römer, graduating in 1998.

Her reputation in Europe led to an invitation by world renowned classical guitarist and professor Manuel Barrueco to study at the Peabody Institute in Baltimore, Maryland, from which she graduated in 2003.

== Career ==
Her international career includes frequent recitals, concerto engagements, festival appearances, and tours all over the world. Vidović has performed with numerous orchestras. She often plays works by Johann Sebastian Bach, who is her favorite composer, and other composers such as Federico Moreno Torroba, Manuel Ponce, Francisco Tárrega, and Joaquín Rodrigo (including Concierto de Aranjuez).

Ana Vidović has won over twenty awards at international competitions, in which she participated until she was 18 years old. Her accolades include first prizes in the Albert Augustine Memorial International Competition (Bath, England) at the age of 13, the Fernando Sor competition (Rome, Italy), and the Francisco Tárrega International Guitar Competition (Benicàssim, Spain, 1998). Other top prizes include the Eurovision Young Musicians competition, the Mauro Giuliani competition in Italy, the Printemps de la Guitare competition in Belgium, and the Young Concert Artists International Auditions in New York.

In a review of one of her performances in 2006, Stephen Brookes of The Washington Post wrote: "her playing [...] was virtually immaculate – detailed, precise and polished. But this was no mere virtuosic display. Vidovic's playing is nuanced and intensely personal, both deeply felt and deeply thought." Guitar Review's Stephen Griesgraber noted "It is difficult to know where to begin when discussing the enormous talents of Ana Vidovic. Her dynamic range, beauty of sound, precision of articulation and virtuosity are such that listening becomes more of an absolute musical experience."

She cites Paco de Lucía as a role model, John Williams as a significant musical inspiration, along with many other composers and musicians. She mentioned Jacqueline du Pré's performance of the Elgar Concerto as one of her favorite classical CDs.

Vidović plays a Jim Redgate guitar exclusively and said, "[Several] years ago, I tried a Redgate [...] and felt an immediate connection [...]. This is a very special instrument that you could explore for many years."

She has released six CDs, two live DVDs, and has been featured on compilation albums. Guitar Virtuoso (2006) DVD is a performance of works by Bach, Torroba, Paganini, and Walton; while on Guitar Artistry in Concert (2009), she performs the music of Torroba, Piazzolla, Pierre Bensusan, Sérgio Assad, Stanley Myers, Villa-Lobos, and Barrios.

== Discography ==
CDs

- Ana Vidovic, Croatia Records, 1994
- Ana Vidović - Guitar, BGS Records (BGCD 103), 1996
- The Croatian Prodigy, BGS, 1999
- Guitar Recital: Ana Vidovic, Naxos Laureate Series (8.554563), 2000
- Ana Vidovic Live!, Croatia Records, 2001
- Moreno-Torroba: Guitar Music, Vol. 1, Naxos (8.557902), 2007
- Live at Hampden Hall, Octave Records, 2023

DVDs

- Ana Vidovic: Guitar Virtuoso, Mel Bay Publications Inc. (21186DVD), 2006
- Ana Vidovic: Guitar Artistry in Concert, Mel Bay Publications Inc. (21991DVD), 2009
