= Vidovići, Bosansko Grahovo =

Vidovići Видовићи
- Village
- Location within Bosnia and Herzegovina
- Coordinates: 44°12′09″N 16°21′15″E
- Country: Bosnia and Herzegovina
- Entity: Federation of Bosnia and Herzegovina
- Canton: Canton 10
- Municipality: Bosansko Grahovo

Area
  - Total: 8.03 km^{2} (3.10 sq mi)

Population (2013)
  - Total: 18
  - Density: 2.2/km^{2} (5.8/sq mi)
- Time zone: UTC+1 (CET)
  - Summer (DST): UTC+2 (CEST)

Vidovići (Serbian Cyrillic: Видовићи) is a village in the Municipality of Bosansko Grahovo in Canton 10 of the Federation of Bosnia and Herzegovina, an entity of Bosnia and Herzegovina.

== Demographics ==
According to the 2013 census, its population was 18.

Ethnicity in 2013
Ethnicity	Number	Percentage
Serbs	16	88.9%
Croats	2	11.1%
Total	18	100%

== Bibliography ==
- Ethnicity/National Affiliation, Religion and Mother Tongue (PDF). Sarajevo: Agency for Statistics of Bosnia and Herzegovina. 2019.
