= David Russell (guitarist) =

Scottish guitarist

- Born: June 1, 1953 (age 72); Glasgow, Scotland
- Genres: Classical
- Occupations: Musician and Teacher
- Instrument: Classical Guitar
- Years active: 1978–present
- Labels: Azica Records and Telarc
- Website: DavidRussell.com

David Russell (born 1953 in Glasgow, Scotland) is a classical guitarist. Although he has a wide collection of instruments, he is most known for his association with Matthias Dammann guitars and D’Addario Pro-Arte’ Nylon strings.

== Early and personal life ==
When Russell was five years of age, his family moved from Glasgow, Scotland, to Menorca, where he became interested in the guitar, imitating the likes of Andrés Segovia and Julian Bream. Russell now resides in Galicia, but spends most of his time touring and playing in musical festivals worldwide. He is also a golf enthusiast and has won amateur golf tournaments in Scotland and Spain. Russell is a supporter of his local football team, Celta de Vigo.

== Honours and awards ==
Under the tutelage of Hector Quine at the Royal Academy of Music, Russell won the Julian Bream Guitar Prize twice. He graduated in 1974 with a scholarship from the Ralph Vaughan Williams Trust. Later, he won numerous international competitions, including the Andrés Segovia Competition, the José Ramírez Competition, and Spain's Francisco Tárrega International Guitar Competition (1977). Russell was named a Fellow of the Royal Academy of Music in London in 1997. In May 2003, he was awarded the honour of being made "adopted son" of Es Migjorn Gran, the town on Menorca where he grew up. In November 2003, he was given the Medal of Honour of the Conservatory of the Balearics. In 2005, he won a Grammy Award for best instrumental soloist in classical music for his CD Aire Latino. In May 2005, Russell received homage from the music conservatory of Vigo, culminating with the opening of the new auditorium given the name "Auditorio David Russell." David was named honorary member of “Amigos de la Guitarra” - the oldest guitar society in Spain - in 2009 and he was inducted into the Hall of Fame of the Guitar Foundation of America in 2018.

== Discography ==
Year	Album	Label	Notes
2021	Cantigas de Santiago	Azica Records	
2012	Grandeur Of The Baroque	Telarc International Corporation	
2011	Isaac Albéniz	Telarc	
2010	Sonidos Latinos	Telarc	
2009	For David	Telarc	
2008	Air On A G String	Telarc	
2007	Art Of The Guitar	Telarc	
2006	Renaissance Favorites For Guitar	Telarc	
2005	Spanish Legends	Telarc	
2004	Aire Latino	Telarc	Grammy Award for Best Instrumental Soloist Performance (without orchestra)
2003	David Russell Plays Bach	Telarc	
2002	Reflections Of Spain	Telarc	
2001	David Russell Plays Baroque Music	Telarc	
1999	Music Of Giuliani	Telarc	
1998	Message Of The Sea	Telarc	
1997	Rodrigo Concertos	Telarc	Featuring Erich Kunzel (Conductor)
1996	Music Of Federico Moreno Torroba	Telarc	
1995	Music Of Barrios	Telarc	
1994	Guitare Québec 94	Doberman-Yppan Records	Featuring Leo Brouwer (Conductor)
1991	Tárrega: Integral de Guitarra	Opera Tres Records	
1989	Haendel, Bach, Scarlatti	GHA Records	
1987	19th Century Music	GHA Records	
1985	Mario Castelnuovo-Tedesco	Academix Records	Featuring Raphaella Smits (Guitar) & Jos Van Immerseel (Piano)
1984	Dennis Milne Guitar Concerto	Phoenix Records	Featuring The Chamber Music Players of London
1983	Guitarduets	Poketino Records	Featuring Raphaella Smits (Guitar)
1980	Plays Antonio Lauro	Guitar Master Records	
1979	Something Unique	Overture Records	
1978	Double Bass And Guitar	Festival Records	Featuring Dennis Milne (Double Bass)
