= Viktor Vidović =

Croatian classical guitarist

Viktor Vidović (born 1973) is a Croatian classical guitarist.

== Early years ==
Born in Karlovac, Croatia, Viktor Vidović came from a well-known musical family, whose influence on his achievements was significant. His sister, Ana, was introduced to music by him and eventually became an internationally recognised guitar virtuoso.

At 12, he had his first solo concert. At 13, he was awarded first place at competitions in Croatia and the former Yugoslavia, coming far in front of rivals, generations above him. At 14 he enrolled in the Conservatoire de Musique de Genève, in the class of Brazilian guitarist Maria Lívia São Marcos, under whose guidance he took the first place at CIEM, the Geneva International Music Competition, becoming the youngest winner in the history of the competition, taking the Villa Lobos Prize and the Patek Philippe Prize for distinguished musical interpretation.

He completed his studies at the Conservatoire de Musique de Genève at 16 with a diploma and "the first prize for virtuosity" by way of special recognition. He completed a course at Salzburg's Mozarteum under professor Matthias Seidel at the age of 21, earning a degree of Master of Arts. During his studies he was awarded the Franz Kossak Prize and a prize of the Austrian Ministry of Culture and also won the special prize for the interpretation of contemporary music at the International Music Competition in Templin.

== Development ==
In the early 1990s he began attending the master classes of Leo Brouwer, Eliot Fisk and David Tannenbaum. In 2000, he was a finalist at the Rene Bartoli competition in France in 2000 and was awarded with a special audience prize.

Vidović has spent a great deal of time studying composition, creating original compositions and transcriptions for the classical guitar. He has also explored other genres such as jazz, Latino and original ethno music of various cultures. He is noted in particular for his recitals of Croatian dances including works by Boris Papandopulo and Bruno Krajcar. He has performed Balun, a popular Istrian dance by Bruno Krajcar with his sister.

== Concerts ==
He has performed in the top concert halls all around Europe, including Italy, Germany, France, Spain, Portugal, Belgium, Russia, Austria, Hungary, Macedonia, Slovenia, Holland and elsewhere. He has performed with the Zagreb Philharmonic Orchestra, the Orchestre de la Suisse Romande and Stuttgart Philharmonic Orchestra. He is also a guitar teacher, and he leads numerous masterclasses, including the masterclass at Medulin, Istria every June. He performed at a concert in Hong Kong with the Moscow Philharmonic Orchestra in October 2017.

== Private life ==
He is the older brother of Ana Vidović.
